= Swimming at the 2026 Asian Games =

- Venue: Tokyo Aquatics Centre
- Dates: 20–25 September 2026
- Competitors: 409 from 37 nations

The swimming competitions at the 2026 Asian Games was held between 20 and 25 September 2026 at the Tokyo Aquatics Centre.

China topped the swimming medal table winning a record 30 gold medals, matching its gold-medal tally from the 2022 Asian Games. Japan finished second with seven gold medals, improving on its third-place finish and medal tally from the previous edition.

The competition produced one world record, seven Asian records and 24 Asian Games records. Bahrain and Kyrgyzstan won their first Asian Games swimming medals.

== Schedule ==
The schedule is as follows:

| H | Heats | F | Final |

| Date | 20th Sun | | 21st Mon | | 22nd Tue | | 23rd Wed | | 24th Thu | | 25th Fri | |
| Event | M | E | M | E | M | E | M | E | M | E | M | E |
|---|---|---|---|---|---|---|---|---|---|---|---|---|
Men's events
| 50 m freestyle | | | H | F | | | | | | | | |
| 100 m freestyle | H | F | | | | | | | | | | |
| 200 m freestyle | | | | | | | H | F | | | | |
| 400 m freestyle | | | | | | | | | | | H | F |
| 800 m freestyle | | | | | | | | | F | | | |
| 1500 m freestyle | | | | | F | | | | | | | |
| 50 m backstroke | | | H | F | | | | | | | | |
| 100 m backstroke | H | F | | | | | | | | | | |
| 200 m backstroke | | | | | | | | | | | H | F |
| 50 m breaststroke | | | | | | | | | | | H | F |
| 100 m breaststroke | | | H | F | | | | | | | | |
| 200 m breaststroke | | | | | | | | | H | F | | |
| 50 m butterfly | | | | | | | | | H | F | | |
| 100 m butterfly | | | | | | | H | F | | | | |
| 200 m butterfly | | | | | | | | | | | H | F |
| 200 m individual medley | H | F | | | | | | | | | | |
| 400 m individual medley | | | | | H | F | | | | | | |
| 4 × 100 m freestyle relay | | | | | | | | | H | F | | |
| 4 × 200 m freestyle relay | | | H | F | | | | | | | | |
| 4 × 100 m medley relay | | | | | H | F | | | | | | |
Women's events
| 50 m freestyle | | | | | | | | | H | F | | |
| 100 m freestyle | | | | | H | F | | | | | | |
| 200 m freestyle | | | H | F | | | | | | | | |
| 400 m freestyle | | | | | H | F | | | | | | |
| 800 m freestyle | | | | | | | | | | | F | |
| 1500 m freestyle | F | | | | | | | | | | | |
| 50 m backstroke | | | H | F | | | | | | | | |
| 100 m backstroke | | | | | | | H | F | | | | |
| 200 m backstroke | | | | | H | F | | | | | | |
| 50 m breaststroke | H | F | | | | | | | | | | |
| 100 m breaststroke | | | | | | | H | F | | | | |
| 200 m breaststroke | | | | | | | | | H | F | | |
| 50 m butterfly | | | | | | | | | | | H | F |
| 100 m butterfly | | | | | | | H | F | | | | |
| 200 m butterfly | H | F | | | | | | | | | | |
| 200 m individual medley | | | H | F | | | | | | | | |
| 400 m individual medley | | | | | | | H | F | | | | |
| 4 × 100 m freestyle relay | H | F | | | | | | | | | | |
| 4 × 200 m freestyle relay | | | | | | | | | H | F | | |
| 4 × 100 m medley relay | | | | | | | | | | | H | F |
Mixed events
| 4 × 100 m medley relay | | | | | | | H | F | | | | |

== Medal summary ==
=== Medal table ===
* Host nation (Japan)

| Rank | Nation | Gold | Silver | Bronze | Total |
|---|---|---|---|---|---|
| 1 | China | 30 | 13 | 11 | 54 |
| 2 | Japan* | 7 | 15 | 15 | 37 |
| 3 | Hong Kong | 2 | 3 | 1 | 6 |
| 4 | South Korea | 1 | 6 | 13 | 20 |
| 5 | Bahrain | 1 | 0 | 0 | 1 |
| 5 | Chinese Taipei | 1 | 0 | 0 | 1 |
| 7 | Singapore | 0 | 3 | 0 | 3 |
| 8 | Kyrgyzstan | 0 | 1 | 0 | 1 |
| Totals (8 entries) | | 42 | 41 | 40 | 123 |

=== Medalists ===
==== Men's events ====
| Event | Gold | | Silver | | Bronze | |
|---|---|---|---|---|---|---|
| 50 m freestyle | Kim Young-beom; South Korea | 21.66; GR | Ian Ho; Hong Kong | 21.76 | Ji Yu-chan; South Korea | 21.94 |
| 100 m freestyle | Pan Zhanle; China | 47.61 | Kim Young-beom; South Korea | 47.65 | Hwang Sun-woo; South Korea | 47.79 |
| 200 m freestyle | Zhang Zhanshuo; China | 1:43.49; AR | Hwang Sun-woo; South Korea | 1:44.62 | Tatsuya Murasa; Japan | 1:44.81 |
| 400 m freestyle | Zhang Zhanshuo; China | 3:41.28; GR | Kazushi Imafuku; Japan | 3:45.55 | Fei Liwei; China | 3:45.78 |
| 800 m freestyle | Zhang Zhanshuo; China | 7:42.49; GR | Kaito Tabuchi; Japan | 7:43.86 | not awarded | |
| 800 m freestyle | Zhang Zhanshuo; China | 7:42.49; GR | Kim Jun-woo; South Korea | 7:43.86 | not awarded | |
| 1500 m freestyle | Zhang Zhanshuo; China | 14:42.42 | Kaito Tabuchi; Japan | 14:45.99 | Kazushi Imafuku; Japan | 14:54.37 |
| 50 m backstroke | Xu Jiayu; China | 24.04; GR | Wang Zicheng; China | 24.49 | Yoon Ji-hwan; South Korea | 24.54 |
| 100 m backstroke | Xu Jiayu; China | 51.98; GR | Hidekazu Takehara; Japan | 53.93 | Lee Ju-ho; South Korea | 53.94 |
| 200 m backstroke | Kodai Nishiono; Japan | 1:56.42 | Lee Ju-ho; South Korea | 1:56.58 | Xu Jiayu; China | 1:56.73 |
| 50 m breaststroke | Qin Haiyang; China | 26.68 | Liu Junjie; China | 26.99 | Shin Ohashi; Japan | 27.01 |
| 100 m breaststroke | Dong Zhihao; China | 58.64 | not awarded | | Qin Haiyang; China | 59.01 |
| 100 m breaststroke | Shin Ohashi; Japan | 58.64 | not awarded | | Qin Haiyang; China | 59.01 |
| 200 m breaststroke | Shin Ohashi; Japan | 2:04.83; WR | Denis Petrashov; Kyrgyzstan | 2:08.67 | Cho Sung-jae; South Korea | 2:08.76 |
| 50 m butterfly | Mikhail Arkhangelskiy; Bahrain | 22.91 =AR | Shoon Mitsunaga; Japan | 23.06 | Wang Changhao; China | 23.25 |
| 100 m butterfly | Shoon Mitsunaga; Japan | 50.56; GR | Xu Fang; China | 50.73 =NR | Katsuhiro Matsumoto; Japan | 51.36 |
| 200 m butterfly | Wang Kuan-hung; Chinese Taipei | 1:55.05 | Xu Fang; China | 1:55.65 | Kim Min-seop; South Korea | 1:55.94 |
| 200 m individual medley | Tomoyuki Matsushita; Japan | 1:55.30 | Yumeki Kojima; Japan | 1:55.36; WJ | Wang Shun; China | 1:57.14 |
| 400 m individual medley | Yumeki Kojima; Japan | 4:07.02; GR, WJ | Tomoyuki Matsushita; Japan | 4:09.64 | Wang Shun; China | 4:14.59 |
| 4 × 100 m freestyle relay | China; Zhao Jiayue (48.43); Wang Haoyu (47.77); Zhang Zhanshuo (47.65); Pan Zhanle (46.75); Xu Haibo^{[a]} Xu Fang^{[a]} | 3:10.60; AR | South Korea; Hwang Sun-woo (47.50); Kim Ji-hun (48.70); Yang Jae-hoon (48.65); Kim Young-beom (46.84); Kim Woo-min^{[a]} Ji Yu-chan^{[a]} Lee Ho-joon^{[a]} Kim Min-seop^{[a]} | 3:11.69 | Japan; Tatsuya Murasa (48.05); Shuya Matsumoto (48.30); Katsuhiro Matsumoto (47.81); Shoon Mitsunaga (47.80); Kazusa Kuroda^{[a]} Konosuke Yanagimoto^{[a]} Kazushi Imafuku^{[a]} | 3:11.96 |
| 4 × 200 m freestyle relay | China; Xu Haibo (1:46.27); Fei Liwei (1:46.74); Pan Zhanle (1:44.24); Zhang Zhanshuo (1:42.92); Zhao Jiayue^{[a]} Wang Haoyu^{[a]} Wang Shun^{[a]} | 7:00.17; AR | Japan; Tatsuya Murasa (1:44.70); Katsuhiro Matsumoto (1:44.84); Kazusa Kuroda (1:45.82); Tomoyuki Matsushita (1:45.69); Konosuke Yanagimoto^{[a]} Kazushi Imafuku^{[a]} | 7:01.05; NR | South Korea; Kim Jun-woo (1:47.16); Kim Woo-min (1:46.16); Lee Ho-joon (1:47.57); Hwang Sun-woo (1:45.87); Kim Min-seop^{[a]} Yang Jae-hoon^{[a]} | 7:06.76 |
| 4 × 100 m medley relay | China; Xu Jiayu (52.13); Dong Zhihao (57.94); Xu Fang (50.52); Pan Zhanle (47.30); Jiang Chenglin^{[a]} Qin Haiyang^{[a]} Wang Xizhe^{[a]} Zhang Zhanshuo^{[a]} | 3:27.89 | Japan; Hidekazu Takehara (53.71); Shin Ohashi (57.64); Shoon Mitsunaga (49.74); Tatsuya Murasa (47.61); Shuya Matsumoto^{[a]} | 3:28.70 | South Korea; Lee Ju-ho (53.92); Choi Dong-yeol (58.98); Yang Jae-hoon (51.58); Kim Young-beom (47.49); Yoon Ji-hwan^{[a]} Cho Sung-jae^{[a]} Kim Ji-hun^{[a]} Hwang Sun-woo^{[a]} | 3:31.97 |

^{a} Swimmers who participated in the heats only and received medals.

==== Women's events ====
| Event | Gold | | Silver | | Bronze | |
|---|---|---|---|---|---|---|
| 50 m freestyle | Wu Qingfeng; China | 23.98; GR | Siobhán Haughey; Hong Kong | 24.32 | Cheng Yujie; China | 24.46 |
| 100 m freestyle | Siobhán Haughey; Hong Kong | 52.45 | Yu Yiting; China | 53.21 | Cheng Yujie; China | 53.47 |
| 200 m freestyle | Siobhán Haughey; Hong Kong | 1:54.96 | Li Jiaping; China | 1:56.58 | Liu Yaxin; China | 1:57.53 |
| 400 m freestyle | Li Bingjie; China | 4:02.71 | Gan Ching Hwee; Singapore | 4:06.81 | Ichika Kajimoto; Japan | 4:07.45 |
| 800 m freestyle | Li Bingjie; China | 8:24.02 | Gan Ching Hwee; Singapore | 8:26.25 | Ichika Kajimoto; Japan | 8:27.37 |
| 1500 m freestyle | Li Bingjie; China | 15:53.52 | Gan Ching Hwee; Singapore | 16:00.45 | Ichika Kajimoto; Japan | 16:06.83 |
| 50 m backstroke | Wan Letian; China | 27.47 | Wang Xue'er; China | 27.66 | Kim Seung-won; South Korea | 27.72 |
| 100 m backstroke | Peng Xuwei; China | 59.30 | Rio Shirai; Japan | 59.89 | Kim Seung-won; South Korea | 1:00.10 |
| 200 m backstroke | Peng Xuwei; China | 2:05.77; AR | Sun Mingxia; China | 2:08.65 | Rio Shirai; Japan | 2:08.70 |
| 50 m breaststroke | Tang Qianting; China | 29.45; GR | Satomi Suzuki; Japan | 29.91; NR | Yang Chang; China | 30.24 |
| 100 m breaststroke | Tang Qianting; China | 1:04.98; GR | Satomi Suzuki; Japan | 1:05.83 | Kotomi Kato; Japan | 1:06.37 |
| 200 m breaststroke | Kotomi Kato; Japan | 2:22.57 | Park Si-eun; South Korea | 2:22.69 NR | Zhu Leiju; China | 2:25.51 |
| 50 m butterfly | Zhang Yufei; China | 25.41 | Wu Qingfeng; China | 25.62 | Rikako Ikee; Japan | 25.97 |
| 100 m butterfly | Yu Yiting; China | 56.41 | Zhang Yufei; China | 56.44 | Natalie Kan; Hong Kong | 58.05 |
| 200 m butterfly | Yu Zidi; China | 2:05.08; GR | Chang Mohan; China | 2:08.44 | Misa Okuzono; Japan | 2:09.67 |
| 200 m individual medley | Yu Zidi; China | 2:06.10; AR, WJ | Yu Yiting; China | 2:07.99 | Mio Narita; Japan | 2:10.40 |
| 400 m individual medley | Yu Zidi; China | 4:28.56; GR | Ke Wenxi; China | 4:32.51 | Mio Narita; Japan | 4:33.45 |
| 4 × 100 m freestyle relay | China; Yu Yiting (53.39); Zhang Yufei (52.99); Cheng Yujie (53.79); Wu Qingfeng (52.93); Fan Yaqi^{[b]} Li Jiaping^{[b]} Liu Yaxin^{[b]} Li Bingjie^{[b]} | 3:33.10; GR | Hong Kong; Gilaine Ma (54.95); Siobhán Haughey (52.22); Li Sum Yiu (54.51); Natalie Kan (54.91); Wang Xintong^{[b]} | 3:36.59; NR | Japan; Ayu Mizoguchi (55.03); Rio Suzuki (55.04); Nagisa Ikemoto (54.47); Shiho Matsumoto (54.55); Yui Fukuoka^{[b]} Miyu Namba^{[b]} | 3:39.09 |
| 4 × 200 m freestyle relay | China; Li Jiaping (1:57.78); Liu Yaxin (1:55.97); Yu Yiting (1:55.93); Li Bingjie (1:59.69); Fan Yaqi^{[b]} Cheng Yujie^{[b]} Gao Weizhong^{[b]} Yang Peiqi^{[b]} | 7:49.37 | Japan; Rio Suzuki (1:59.02); Waka Kobori (1:59.37); Ruka Takezawa (2:00.19); Yui Fukuoka (2:00.95); Miyu Namba^{[b]} | 7:59.53 | South Korea; Jo Hyun-ju (1:58.99); Hur Yeon-kyung (2:00.96); Han Da-kyung (2:01.11); Lee Song-eun (2:00.81); Kim Yun-hui^{[b]} Kim Chae-yun^{[b]} | 8:01.87 |
| 4 × 100 m medley relay | China; Peng Xuwei (59.20); Tang Qianting (1:05.74); Zhang Yufei (56.30); Yu Yiting (53.31); Li Wanwei^{[b]} Yang Chang^{[b]} Cheng Yujie^{[b]} | 3:54.55; GR | Japan; Rio Shirai (59.97); Satomi Suzuki (1:05.13); Rikako Ikee (58.27); Nagisa Ikemoto (54.37); Chiho Mizoguchi^{[b]} | 3:57.64 | South Korea; Kim Seung-won (1:00.00); Park Si-eun (1:07.39); An Se-hyeon (58.04); Hur Yeon-kyung (55.24); Lee Eun-ji^{[b]} Lee Song-eun^{[b]} Jo Hyun-ju^{[b]} | 4:00.67 |

^{b} Swimmers who participated in the heats only and received medals.

==== Mixed events ====
| Event | Gold | | Silver | | Bronze | |
|---|---|---|---|---|---|---|
| 4 × 100 m medley relay | China; Xu Jiayu (52.28); Dong Zhihao (58.28); Zhang Yufei (56.89); Yu Yiting (52.93); Li Wanwei^{[c]} Qin Haiyang^{[c]} Xu Fang^{[c]} Cheng Yujie^{[c]} | 3:40.38 | Japan; Hidekazu Takehara (53.91); Shin Ohashi (57.86); Rikako Ikee (58.42); Nagisa Ikemoto (53.79); Chiho Mizuguchi^{[c]} Shiho Matsumoto^{[c]} | 3:43.98 | South Korea; Kim Seung-won (1:00.15); Choi Dong-yeol (59.04); An Se-hyeon (57.66); Kim Young-beom (47.27); Lee Eun-ji^{[c]} Park Si-eun^{[c]} Kim Ji-hun^{[c]} Hwang Sun-woo^{[c]} | 3:44.12 NR |

^{c} Swimmers who participated in the heats only and received medals.

== Participating nations ==
- Afghanistan (2)
- Bahrain (9)
- Bangladesh (2)
- Cambodia (4)
- China (44)
- Chinese Taipei (15)
- Hong Kong (34)
- India (13)
- Indonesia (14)
- Iran (4)
- Japan (33) (host)
- Kazakhstan (10)
- Kuwait (9)
- Kyrgyzstan (3)
- Laos (2)
- Lebanon (2)
- Macau (10)
- Malaysia (9)
- Maldives (4)
- Mongolia (34)
- Nepal (5)
- Pakistan (3)
- Palestine (7)
- Philippines (7)
- Qatar (8)
- Saudi Arabia (7)
- Singapore (29)
- South Korea (26)
- Sri Lanka (2)
- Tajikistan (11)
- Thailand (19)
- Timor-Leste (2)
- Turkmenistan (3)
- United Arab Emirates (6)
- Uzbekistan (5)
- Vietnam (10)
- Yemen (2)
