= Swimming at the 2022 Asian Games – Men's 400 metre freestyle =

Men's 400 metre freestyle at the 2022 Asian Games
- Venue: Hangzhou Olympic Expo Aquatics Center
- Date: 29 September 2023
- Competitors: 25 from 16 nations

Medalists
gold medal	Kim Woo-min	South Korea
silver medal	Pan Zhanle	China
bronze medal	Nguyễn Huy Hoàng	Vietnam

The men's 400 metre freestyle event at the 2022 Asian Games took place on 29 September 2023 at the Hangzhou Olympic Expo Center.

== Schedule ==
All times are China Standard Time (UTC+08:00)

Date	Time	Event
Friday, 29 September 2023	11:02	Heats
Friday, 29 September 2023	20:21	Final

== Records ==
Prior to this competition, the existing world, Asian and Games records were as follows.

World Record	Paul Biedermann (GER)	3:40.07	Rome, Italy	26 July 2009
Asian Record	Sun Yang (CHN)	3:40.14	London, United Kingdom	28 July 2012
Games Record	Park Tae-hwan (KOR)	3:41.53	Guangzhou, China	16 November 2010

== Results ==
=== Heats ===
Rank	Heat	Athlete	Time	Notes
1	4	Kim Woo-min (KOR)	3:49.03	
2	4	Khiew Hoe Yean (MAS)	3:51.31	
3	4	Kaito Tabuchi (JPN)	3:52.28	
4	4	Nguyễn Huy Hoàng (VIE)	3:53.04	
5	3	Zhang Ziyang (CHN)	3:53.21	
6	3	Pan Zhanle (CHN)	3:53.38	
7	3	Ikki Imoto (JPN)	3:53.62	
8	3	Glen Lim (SGP)	3:54.45	
9	3	Đỗ Ngọc Vinh (VIE)	3:57.20	
10	3	Ratthawit Thammananthachote (THA)	3:57.88	
11	4	Aryan Nehra (IND)	3:58.18	
12	4	Ardi Zulhilmi Azman (SGP)	3:58.36	
13	4	Tan Khai Xin (MAS)	3:58.62	
14	3	Karel Subagyo (INA)	3:59.07	
15	3	Cheuk Ming Ho (HKG)	3:59.52	
16	2	Egor Petryakov (UZB)	3:59.56	
17	4	Kushagra Rawat (IND)	4:01.24	
18	2	He Shing Ip (HKG)	4:06.53	
19	2	Sauod Al-Shamroukh (KUW)	4:06.70	
20	1	Muhammad Amaan Siddiqui (PAK)	4:19.71	
21	2	Nasir Yahya Hussain (NEP)	4:22.03	
22	2	Ahmed Diab (QAT)	4:22.30	
23	1	Gongoryn Maidar (MGL)	4:29.17	
24	2	Abdulla Al-Khaldi (QAT)	4:30.82	
25	1	Bayanmönkhiin Javkhlan (MGL)	4:49.22	

=== Final ===
Rank	Athlete	Time	Notes
1st place, gold medalist(s)	Kim Woo-min (KOR)	3:44.36	
2nd place, silver medalist(s)	Pan Zhanle (CHN)	3:48.81	
3rd place, bronze medalist(s)	Nguyễn Huy Hoàng (VIE)	3:49.16	
4	Khiew Hoe Yean (MAS)	3:49.47	
5	Ikki Imoto (JPN)	3:50.09	
6	Zhang Ziyang (CHN)	3:50.12	
7	Kaito Tabuchi (JPN)	3:50.63	
8	Glen Lim (SGP)	3:53.47	
