= List of Japanese records in swimming =

These are the Japanese records in swimming: they are the fastest times ever swum by a swimmer from Japan in recognized events. The records are kept and maintained by the Japan Swimming Federation (JSF). The JSF recognizes records swum in both long course (50m) and short course (25m) pools.

== Long course (50 metres) ==
=== Men ===
Event	Time		Name	Club	Date	Meet	Location	Ref
50 m freestyle	21.64	AS	Shuya Matsumoto	Himawari Network	27 July 2025	Shizuoka Championships	Fuji, Japan	
100 m freestyle	47.83	r	Tatsuya Murasa	Chuo University	4 September 2026	Japanese Intercollege Championships	Osaka, Japan	
200 m freestyle	1:44.54		Tatsuya Murasa	Japan	29 July 2025	World Championships	Singapore, Singapore	
400 m freestyle	3:43.90		Kosuke Hagino	Toyo University	12 April 2014	Japanese Championships	Tokyo, Japan	
800 m freestyle	7:43.86		Kaito Tabuchi	Japan	24 September 2026	Asian Games	Tokyo, Japan	
1500 m freestyle	14:42.59		Kazushi Imafuku	Japan	15 August 2026	Pan Pacific Championships	Irvine, United States	
50 m backstroke	24.24	AS	Junya Koga	Japan	2 Aug 2009	World Championships	Rome, Italy	
100 m backstroke	52.24	r	Ryosuke Irie	Kinki University	5 Sep 2009	Japanese University Championships	Kumamoto, Japan	
200 m backstroke	1:52.51	AS	Ryosuke Irie	Japan	31 Jul 2009	World Championships	Rome, Italy	
50 m breaststroke	26.65	h	Taku Taniguchi	Japan	29 July 2025	World Championships	Singapore, Singapore	
100 m breaststroke	58.54		Shin Ohashi	Japan	13 August 2026	Pan Pacific Championships	Irvine, United States	
200 m breaststroke	2:04.83	WR	Shin Ohashi	Japan	24 September 2026	Asian Games	Tokyo, Japan	
50 m butterfly	23.06	=	Taikan Tanaka	Kikkoman	20 March 2025	Japanese Championships	Tokyo, Japan	
50 m butterfly	23.06	h, =	Shoon Mitsunaga	Chuo University	19 March 2026	Japanese Championships	Tokyo, Japan	
50 m butterfly	23.06	=	Shoon Mitsunaga	Japan	24 September 2026	Asian Games	Tokyo, Japan	
100 m butterfly	50.56		Shoon Mitsunaga	Japan	23 September 2026	Asian Games	Tokyo, Japan	
200 m butterfly	1:52.53	AS	Daiya Seto	Japan	18 January 2020	Champions Swim Series	Beijing, China	
200 m individual medley	1:55.07		Kosuke Hagino	Toyo University	9 April 2016	Japanese Championships	Tokyo, Japan	
400 m individual medley	4:05.83	AS	Tomoyuki Matsushita	Toyo University	3 September 2026	Japanese Intercollege Championships	Osaka, Japan	
4×50 m freestyle relay	1:27.48		Shinri Shioura (22.07); Akira Namba (21.69); Kaiya Seki (22.17); Katsumi Nakamura (21.55)	Japan	3 July 2021	Summer Challenge Meet	Sagamihara, Japan	
4×100 m freestyle relay	3:11.96		Tatsuya Murasa (48.05); Shuya Matsumoto (48.30); Katsuhiro Matsumoto (47.81); Shoon Mitsunaga (47.80)	Japan	24 September 2026	Asian Games	Tokyo, Japan	
4×200 m freestyle relay	7:01.05		Tatsuya Murasa (1:44.70); Katsuhiro Matsumoto (1:44.84); Kazusa Kuroda (1:45.82); Tomoyuki Matsushita (1:45.69)	Japan	21 September 2026	Asian Games	Tokyo, Japan	
4×50 m medley relay	1:36.44		Masaki Yura (25.04); Taku Taniguchi (26.42); Katsuhiro Matsumoto (22.89); Akira Namba (22.09)	Japan	7 June 2025	Tokyo Championships	Tokyo, Japan	
4×100 m medley relay	3:28.70		Hidekazu Takehara (53.71); Shin Ohashi (57.64); Shoon Mitsunaga (49.74); Tatsuya Murasa (47.61)	Japan	22 September 2026	Asian Games	Tokyo, Japan	

Legend: # – Record awaiting ratification by Japan Swimming Federation; WR – World record; AS – Asian record; e – equalled existing record;
Records not set in finals: h – heat; sf – semifinal; r – relay 1st leg; rh – relay heat 1st leg; b – B final; † – en route to final mark; so – swim-off; tt – time trial

=== Women ===
Event	Time		Name	Club	Date	Meet	Location	Ref
50 m freestyle	24.21		Rikako Ikee	Renaissance Kameido	6 April 2018	Japanese Championships	Tokyo, Japan	
100 m freestyle	52.79		Rikako Ikee	Renaissance Kameido	18 November 2018	Kosuke Kitajima Cup	Tokyo, Japan	
200 m freestyle	1:54.85		Rikako Ikee	Japan	9 August 2018	Pan Pacific Championships	Tokyo, Japan	
400 m freestyle	4:05.19		Ai Shibata	Japan	25 March 2007	World Championships	Melbourne, Australia	
800 m freestyle	8:23.11		Ichika Kajimoto	Hirakata SS	22 March 2026	Japanese Championships	Tokyo, Japan	
1500 m freestyle	15:58.55		Ai Shibata	Japan	27 March 2007	World Championships	Melbourne, Australia	
50m backstroke	27.51		Aya Terakawa	Mizuno	13 April 2013	Japanese Championships	Niigata, Japan	
100m backstroke	58.70	r, AS	Aya Terakawa	Japan	4 August 2013	World Championships	Barcelona, Spain	
200m backstroke	2:07.13		Reiko Nakamura	Japan	16 Aug 2008	Olympic Games	Beijing, China	
50m breaststroke	29.91		Satomi Suzuki	Japan	20 September 2026	Asian Games	Tokyo, Japan	
100m breaststroke	1:05.19		Reona Aoki	Mizuno	2 March 2022	Japanese World Championships Trials	Tokyo, Japan	
200m breaststroke	2:19.65	AS	Rie Kaneto	Jaked	9 April 2016	Japanese Championships	Tokyo, Japan	
50m butterfly	25.11		Rikako Ikee	Japan	10 June 2018	Mare Nostrum	Canet-en-Roussillon, France	
100m butterfly	56.08		Rikako Ikee	Japan	11 August 2018	Pan Pacific Championships	Tokyo, Japan	
200m butterfly	2:04.69		Natsumi Hoshi	Swin Daikyo	5 April 2012	Japanese Championships	Tokyo, Japan	
200m individual medley	2:07.91		Yui Ohashi	Japan	24 July 2017	World Championships	Budapest, Hungary	
400m individual medley	4:30.82		Yui Ohashi	Itoman Toshin	8 April 2018	Japanese Championships	Tokyo, Japan	
4×50m freestyle relay	1:39.67		Chihiro Igarashi (25.11); Rikako Ikee (24.71); Natsumi Sakai (25.30); Rika Omoto (24.55)	Japan	4 July 2021	Summer Challenge Meet	Sagamihara, Japan	
4×100m freestyle relay	3:36.17	h	Rika Omoto (54.21); Tomomi Aoki (54.01); Aya Sato (53.98); Rio Shirai (53.97)	Japan	21 July 2019	World Championships	Gwangju, South Korea	
4×200m freestyle relay	7:48.96		Chihiro Igarashi (1:57.88); Rikako Ikee (1:54.69); Rio Shirai (1:58.29); Yui Ohashi (1:58.10)	Japan	10 August 2018	Pan Pacific Championships	Tokyo, Japan	
4×50m medley relay	1:48.12		Miki Takahashi (28.20); Satomi Suzuki (29.72); Mizuki Hirai (25.46); Nagisa Ikemoto (24.76)	Japan	7 June 2025	Tokyo Championships	Tokyo, Japan	
4×100m medley relay	3:54.73		Natsumi Sakai (59.42); Satomi Suzuki (1:05.43); Rikako Ikee (55.80); Tomomi Aoki (54.08)	Japan	23 August 2018	Asian Games	Jakarta, Indonesia	

Legend: # – Record awaiting ratification by Japan Swimming Federation; WR – World record; AS – Asian record; e – equalled existing record;
Records not set in finals: h – heat; sf – semifinal; r – relay 1st leg; rh – relay heat 1st leg; b – B final; † – en route to final mark; so – swim-off; tt – time trial

=== Mixed relay ===
Event	Time		Name	Club	Date	Meet	Location	Ref
4×50 m freestyle relay	1:36.79	not officially ratified	Katsumi Nakamura; Naoya Shiota; Mio Narita; Ruka Takezawa	Japan	19 January 2025	South Australia State Open & MC Championships	Adelaide, Australia	
4×100 m freestyle relay	3:24.67		Katsumi Nakamura (48.49); Katsuhiro Matsumoto (47.99); Rika Omoto (54.36); Aya Sato (53.83)	Japan	27 July 2019	World Championships	Gwangju, South Korea	
4×50 m medley relay	1:47.13	not officially ratified	Naoya Shiota; Taku Taniguchi; Umi Ishizuka; Ruka Takezawa	Japan	19 January 2025	South Australia State Open & MC Championships	Adelaide, Australia	
4×100 m medley relay	3:40.98		Ryosuke Irie (52.83); Yasuhiro Koseki (58.57); Rikako Ikee (55.53); Tomomi Aoki (54.05)	Japan	9 August 2018	Pan Pacific Championships	Tokyo, Japan	

Legend: # – Record awaiting ratification by Japan Swimming Federation; WR – World record; AS – Asian record; e – equalled existing record;
Records not set in finals: h – heat; so – swim-off

== Short course (25 m) ==
=== Men ===
Event	Time		Name	Club	Date	Meet	Location	Ref
50 m freestyle	20.95		Kosuke Matsui	NUHW	26 October 2019	Japanese Championships	Tokyo, Japan	
100 m freestyle	46.22	r	Katsumi Nakamura	Japan	11 December 2018	World Championships	Hangzhou, China	
200 m freestyle	1:41.29	h	Katsuhiro Matsumoto	Japan	18 December 2022	World Championships	Melbourne, Australia	
400 m freestyle	3:36.87		Katsuhiro Matsumoto	Japan	15 December 2022	World Championships	Melbourne, Australia	
800 m freestyle	7:32.76	†	Kaito Tabuchi	Amagasaki SS	10 October 2026	Japanese Championships	Saga, Japan	
1500 m freestyle	14:14.16	AS	Kaito Tabuchi	Amagasaki SS	10 October 2026	Japanese Championships	Saga, Japan	
50 m backstroke	22.81	sf	Junya Koga	Japan	8 December 2016	World Championships	Windsor, Canada	
100 m backstroke	49.65		Masaki Kaneko	Japan	11 August 2017	World Cup	Eindhoven, Netherlands	
200 m backstroke	1:48.25	AS	Masaki Kaneko	Yuras	17 January 2016	Tokyo New Year Championships	Tokyo, Japan	
50m breaststroke	25.43		Taku Taniguchi	Japan	11 October 2026	Japanese Championships	Saga, Japan	
100m breaststroke	55.77		Yuya Hinomoto	Aquatic	16 October 2021	Japanese Championships	Tokyo, Japan	
200m breaststroke	2:00.12	AS	Shin Ohashi	Hirakata SS	12 October 2026	Japanese Championships	Saga, Japan	
50m butterfly	22.16	tt	Hiroto Naito	Chukyo University	15 February 2025	JSCA Mie Regional Winter Championships	Suzuka, Japan	
100m butterfly	48.58	AS	Tomonobu Gomi	Miki House	12 October 2026	Japanese Championships	Saga, Japan	
200m butterfly	1:46.85	WR	Tomoru Honda	Nihon University	22 October 2022	Japanese Championships	Tokyo, Japan	
100m individual medley	51.06	AS	Kosuke Makino	Renaissance Kounanchu	10 October 2026	Japanese Championships	Saga, Japan	
200m individual medley	1:50.42	AS	Tomoyuki Matsushita	Toyo University	12 October 2026	Japanese Championships	Saga, Japan	
400m individual medley	3:54.33	WR	Tomoyuki Matsushita	Toyo University	11 October 2026	Japanese Championships	Saga, Japan	
4×50m freestyle relay	1:23.80	AS	Kosuke Matsui (21.26); Masahiro Kawane (20.79); Takeshi Kawamoto (20.79); Katsumi Nakamura (20.96)	Japan	15 December 2022	World Championships	Melbourne, Australia	
4×100m freestyle relay	3:07.79	AS	Katsumi Nakamura (47.05); Shinri Shioura (46.39); Reo Sakata (47.12); Kosuke Hagino (47.23)	Japan	3 December 2014	World Championships	Doha, Qatar	
4×200m freestyle relay	6:52.04		Temma Watanabe (1:43.78); Katsuhiro Matsumoto (1:40.66); Hidenari Mano (1:43.18); Shuya Matsumoto (1:44.42)	Japan	16 December 2022	World Championships	Melbourne, Australia	
4×50m medley relay	1:31.28	AS	Takeshi Kawamoto (22.93); Yuya Hinomoto (25.64); Yuya Tanaka (22.13); Masahiro Kawane (20.58)	Japan	17 December 2022	World Championships	Melbourne, Australia	
4×100m medley relay	3:21.07	AS	Ryosuke Irie (49.95); Yasuhiro Koseki (55.91); Takeshi Kawamoto (49.58); Katsumi Nakamura (45.63)	Japan	16 December 2018	World Championships	Hangzhou, China	

Legend: # – Record awaiting ratification by Japan Swimming Federation; WR – World record; AS – Asian record; e – equalled existing record;
Records not set in finals: h – heat; sf – semifinal; r – relay 1st leg; rh – relay heat 1st leg; b – B final; † – en route to final mark; so – swim-off; tt – time trial

=== Women ===
Event	Time		Name	Club	Date	Meet	Location	Ref
50 m freestyle	23.95		Rikako Ikee	Japan	21 December 2017	Swim Cup Lausanne	Lausanne, Switzerland	
100 m freestyle	51.62		Rikako Ikee	Renaissance Kameido	14 January 2018	New Year Championships	Tokyo, Japan	
200 m freestyle	1:52.64		Rikako Ikee	Renaissance Kameido	13 January 2018	New Year Championships	Tokyo, Japan	
400 m freestyle	3:59.41		Chihiro Igarashi	Japan	9 December 2016	World Championships	Windsor, Canada	
800 m freestyle	8:12.98		Miyu Namba	Japan	14 December 2022	World Championships	Melbourne, Australia	
1500 m freestyle	15:44.84		Waka Kobori	Central Totsuka	14 February 2021	National Junior Olympic Cup Qualifying Meet	Yokohama, Japan	
1500 m freestyle	15:37.03	#	Ichika Kajimoto	Obayashi	14 November 2026	Mie Tokowaka Championships	Suzuka, Japan	
50m backstroke	25.95		Mizuki Hirai	Tokio Inkarami	18 October 2025	Japanese Championships	Tokyo, Japan	
100m backstroke	55.23	AS	Shiho Sakai	Japan	15 November 2009	World Cup	Berlin, Germany	
200m backstroke	2:00.18	AS	Shiho Sakai	Japan	14 November 2009	World Cup	Berlin, Germany	
50m breaststroke	29.57		Reona Aoki	Tokyo Frog Kings	9 November 2020	International Swimming League	Budapest, Hungary	
100m breaststroke	1:03.82		Kotomi Kato	SW Konosu	10 October 2026	Japanese Championships	Saga, Japan	
200m breaststroke	2:15.76	AS	Rie Kaneto	Japan	9 October 2016	World Cup	Doha, Qatar	
50m butterfly	24.71	AS	Rikako Ikee	Renaissance Kameido	13 January 2018	New Year Championships	Tokyo, Japan	
100m butterfly	55.10	AS	Mizuki Hirai	ATSC.YW	22 February 2025	Sagamihara City Championships	Sagamihara, Japan	
200m butterfly	2:02.96		Suzuka Hasegawa	Tokyo Dome	14 January 2017	Tokyo New Year Championships	Tokyo, Japan	
100m individual medley	57.75		Rikako Ikee	Renaissance Kameido	15 November 2017	World Cup	Tokyo, Japan	
200m individual medley	2:03.93	AS	Yui Ohashi	Tokyo Frog Kings	14 November 2020	International Swimming League	Budapest, Hungary	
400m individual medley	4:22.73	AS	Yui Ohashi	Itoman Toshin	10 November 2018	World Cup	Tokyo, Japan	
4×50m freestyle relay	1:37.35		Aya Sato (24.46); Runa Imai (24.27); Rika Omoto (24.07); Tomomi Aoki (24.55)	Japan	16 December 2018	World Championships	Hangzhou, China	
4×100m freestyle relay	3:31.68		Tomomi Aoki (53.33); Aya Sato (52.60); Runa Imai (53.12); Chihiro Igarashi (52.63)	Japan	11 December 2018	World Championships	Hangzhou, China	
4×200m freestyle relay	7:41.97		Tomomi Aoki (1:56.49); Chihiro Igarashi (1:54.93); Aya Takano (1:56.73); Rikako Ikee (1:53.82)	Japan	10 December 2016	World Championships	Windsor, Canada	
4×50m medley relay	1:44.90		Miyuki Takemura (26.14); Miho Teramura (29.50); Ai Soma (25.28); Aya Sato (23.98)	Japan	12 December 2018	World Championships	Hangzhou, China	
4×100m medley relay	3:50.28		Emi Moronuki (58.25); Miho Teramura (1:03.56); Rikako Ikee (55.43); Tomomi Aoki (53.04)	Japan	11 December 2016	World Championships	Windsor, Canada	

Legend: # – Record awaiting ratification by Japan Swimming Federation; WR – World record; AS – Asian record; e – equalled existing record;
Records not set in finals: h – heat; sf – semifinal; r – relay 1st leg; rh – relay heat 1st leg; b – B final; † – en route to final mark; so – swim-off; tt – time trial

=== Mixed relay ===
Event	Time		Name	Club	Date	Meet	Location	Ref
4×50 m freestyle relay	1:29.51	AS	Katsumi Nakamura (21.03); Kosuke Matsui (20.90); Aya Sato (23.62); Runa Imai (23.96)	Japan	12 December 2018	World Championships	Hangzhou, China	
4×50 m medley relay	1:37.29	AS	Kaiya Seki (23.04); Taku Taniguchi (25.21); Mizuki Hirai (25.07); Yume Jinno (23.91)	Japan	11 December 2024	World Championships	Budapest, Hungary	
4×100 m medley relay	3:37.36	h, AS, not officially ratified	Masaki Yura (51.23); Taku Taniguchi (56.44); Mizuki Hirai (56.07); Yume Jinno (53.62)	Japan	14 December 2024	World Championships	Budapest, Hungary	

Legend: # – Record awaiting ratification by Japan Swimming Federation; AS – Asian record; e – equalled existing record;
Records not set in finals: h – heat; so – swim-off
