= Swimming at the 2025 World Aquatics Championships – Men's 4 × 200 metre freestyle relay =

Men's 4 × 200 metre freestyle relay at the 2025 World Aquatics Championships
- Venue: World Aquatics Championships Arena
- Location: Singapore Sports Hub, Kallang, Singapore
- Dates: 1 August
- Competitors: 70 from 16 nations
- Teams: 16
- Winning time: 6:59.84

Medalists
gold medal	Matt Richards; James Guy; Jack McMillan; Duncan Scott; Evan Jones; Tom Dean	Great Britain
silver medal	Ji Xinjie; Pan Zhanle; Wang Shun; Zhang Zhanshuo; Fei Liwei	China
bronze medal	Flynn Southam; Charlie Hawke; Kai Taylor; Maximillian Giuliani; Edward Sommerville	Australia

The men's 4 × 200 metre freestyle relay at the 2025 World Aquatics Championships was held on 1 August 2025 at the World Aquatics Championships Arena at the Singapore Sports Hub in Kallang, Singapore. Great Britain won the event with China second and Australia third. The United States team, considered a strong medal contender before the competition, finished fourth. British swimmers James Guy and Duncan Scott equalled the record of Michael Phelps of four gold medals in this event.

== Background ==
The event was expected to feature a close contest between Great Britain and the United States. Great Britain, defending Olympic and 2023 world champions, fielded James Guy, Duncan Scott, Matt Richards, and Tom Dean, who collectively held five of the top nine sub-1:44 relay splits in history. The United States, world record holders, featured Luke Hobson, who swam 1:43.73 that season, with Gabriel Jett, Henry McFadden, and possibly Carson Foster completing the lineup. South Korea, anchored by the individual 200-metre world champion Hwang Sun-woo, could challenge if all four swimmers matched their personal bests, while Australia, China, and Germany were considered podium threats. A sub-7:00 race was possible, with several teams approaching historical bests.

== Qualification ==
Each National Federation could enter one team in the relay. The team had to be composed of swimmers who were also competing in the individual events, along with relay only swimmers who had to have met a specific qualifying time for the corresponding stroke and distance they would be swimming in the relay. Federations were only allowed to enter two relay-only swimmers for each relay they entered, though they could also enter relay-only swimmers from other relays which did not count toward this limitation.

== Records ==
Prior to the competition, the existing world and championship records were as follows.

World record	United States	6:58.55	Rome, Italy	31 July 2009
Competition record	United States	6:58.55	Rome, Italy	31 July 2009

== Heats ==
The heats took place on 1 August at 11:49.

Rank	Heat	Lane	Nation	Swimmers	Time	Notes
1	2	4	Great Britain	Jack McMillan (1:45.28); James Guy (1:44.92); Evan Jones (1:47.43); Tom Dean (1:46.35)	7:03.98	Q
2	2	5	Australia	Edward Sommerville (1:46.86); Charlie Hawke (1:45.83); Kai Taylor (1:46.14); Maximillian Giuliani (1:45.49)	7:04.32	Q
3	2	6	South Korea	Kim Young-beom (1:45.72); Kim Woo-min (1:46.09); Lee Ho-joon (1:46.76); Hwang Sun-woo (1:46.11)	7:04.68	Q
4	2	7	Italy	Carlos D’Ambrosio (1:45.89); Filippo Megli (1:46.37); Marco De Tullio (1:46.69); Stefano Di Cola (1:46.22)	7:05.17	Q
5	1	4	United States	Chris Guiliano (1:46.57); Rex Maurer (1:46.11); Henry McFadden (1:45.51); Gabriel Jett (1:47.90)	7:06.09	Q
6	1	5	China	Fei Liwei (1:46.94); Ji Xinjie (1:46.09); Wang Shun (1:46.64); Zhang Zhanshuo (1:46.48)	7:06.15	Q
7	1	2	Israel	Denis Loktev (1:47.02); Yoav Romano (1:46.92); Alexey Glivinskiy (1:46.46); Daniel Krichevsky (1:45.89)	7:06.29	Q, NR
8	2	3	France	Roman Fuchs (1:46.98); Rafael Fente-Damers (1:46.43); Corentin Pouillart (1:47.69); Yann Le Goff (1:45.78)	7:06.88	Q
9	1	3	Germany	Lukas Märtens (1:45.65); Rafael Miroslaw (1:47.11); Jarno Bäschnitt (1:47.08); Timo Sorgius (1:47.70)	7:07.54	
10	1	6	Japan	Tatsuya Murasa (1:45.58); Tomoyuki Matsushita (1:47.58); So Ogata (1:48.24); Asaki Nishikawa (1:47.77)	7:09.17	
11	2	2	Lithuania	Tomas Lukminas (1:47.34); Danas Rapšys (1:47.03); Tajus Juška (1:48.27); Kristupas Trepočka (1:47.84)	7:10.48	
12	2	1	Canada	Ethan Ekk (1:46.71); Antoine Sauve (1:48.16); Filip Senc-Samardzic (1:48.71); Jordi Vilchez (1:48.78)	7:12.36	
13	1	7	Greece	Dimitrios Markos (1:46.37); Konstantinos Englezakis (1:46.93); Konstantinos Stamou (1:47.92); Apostolos Papastamos (1:52.38)	7:13.60	
14	1	1	Ireland	Evan Bailey (1:47.02); Cormac Rynn (1:49.51); Jack Cassin (1:50.07); John Shortt (1:50.10)	7:16.70	
15	1	8	Singapore	Glen Lim (1:49.76); Jonathan Tan (1:49.08); Ardi Azman (1:50.93); Jerald Lium (1:53.23)	7:23.00	
16	2	8	Malaysia	Singh Chahal Arvin Shaun (1:50.03); Khiew Hoe Yean (1:48.01); Tan Khai Xin (1:52.26); Andrew Goh (1:59.00)	7:29.30	
	2	0	Mexico		Did not start	

== Final ==
The final took place on 1 August.

Rank	Lane	Nation	Swimmers	Time	Notes
1st place, gold medalist(s)	4	Great Britain	Matt Richards (1:45.37); James Guy (1:45.00); Jack McMillan (1:45.65); Duncan Scott (1:43.82)	6:59.84	
2nd place, silver medalist(s)	7	China	Ji Xinjie (1:46.22); Pan Zhanle (1:44.41); Wang Shun (1:46.08); Zhang Zhanshuo (1:44.20)	7:00.91	AS
3rd place, bronze medalist(s)	5	Australia	Flynn Southam (1:45.85); Charlie Hawke (1:45.57); Kai Taylor (1:44.64); Maximillian Giuliani (1:44.92)	7:00.98	
4	2	United States	Henry McFadden (1:46.09); Gabriel Jett (1:45.88); Luke Hobson (1:43.45); Rex Maurer (1:45.82)	7:01.24	
5	3	South Korea	Kim Young-beom (1:46.23); Kim Woo-min (1:44.66); Lee Ho-joon (1:46.14); Hwang Sun-woo (1:45.26)	7:02.29	
6	8	France	Roman Fuchs (1:46.11); Yann Le Goff (1:46.38); Rafael Fente-Damers (1:46.86); Léon Marchand (1:44.34)	7:03.69	
7	6	Italy	Carlos D’Ambrosio (1:45.75); Filippo Megli (1:45.91); Marco De Tullio (1:46.52); Stefano Di Cola (1:47.36)	7:05.54	
8	1	Israel	Denis Loktev (1:46.73); Yoav Romano (1:47.01); Alexey Glivinskiy (1:47.42); Daniel Krichevsky (1:45.60)	7:06.76	
