= Swimming at the 2026 Asian Games – Men's 1500 metre freestyle =

Men's 1500 metre freestyle at the 2026 Asian Games
- Venue: Tokyo Aquatics Centre
- Date: 22 September 2026
- Competitors: 22 from 15 nations

Medalists
| gold medal | Zhang Zhanshuo | China |
| silver medal | Kaito Tabuchi | Japan |
| bronze medal | Kazushi Imafuku | Japan |

The men's 1500 metre freestyle event at the 2026 Asian Games took place on 22 September 2026 at the Tokyo Aquatics Centre. China's Zhang Zhanshuo won the gold in a time of 14:42.42.

== Schedule ==
All times are Japan Standard Time (UTC+09:00)

| Date | Time | Event |
|---|---|---|
| Tuesday, 22 September 2026 | 10:42 | Slow heats |
| Tuesday, 22 September 2026 | 17:29 | Fast heat |

== Records ==
Prior to this competition, the existing world, Asian and Games records were as follows.

| World Record | Johannes Liebmann (GER) | 14:26.79 | Paris, France | 15 August 2026 |
| Asian Record | Sun Yang (CHN) | 14:31.02 | London, United Kingdom | 4 August 2012 |
| Games Record | Sun Yang (CHN) | 14:35.43 | Guangzhou, China | 18 November 2010 |

== Results ==
=== Final ===
| Rank | Heat | Athlete | Time | Notes |
|---|---|---|---|---|
| 1st place, gold medalist(s) | A | Zhang Zhanshuo (CHN) | 14:42.42 | |
| 2nd place, silver medalist(s) | A | Kaito Tabuchi (JPN) | 14:45.99 | |
| 3rd place, bronze medalist(s) | A | Kazushi Imafuku (JPN) | 14:54.37 | |
| 4 | A | Rami Bilal Al-Rahmouni (KSA) | 14:55.32 | |
| 5 | A | Kim Jun-woo (KOR) | 14:57.13 | |
| 6 | A | Fei Liwei (CHN) | 15:03.55 | |
| 7 | A | Ilya Sibirtsev (UZB) | 15:08.57 | |
| 8 | A | Kim Woo-min (KOR) | 15:16.52 | |
| 9 | B | Saadeddin Saadeddin (QAT) | 15:21.33 | |
| 10 | B | Russel Pang (SGP) | 15:22.16 | NR |
| 11 | B | Mai Trần Tuấn Anh (VIE) | 15:33.97 | |
| 12 | B | Aryan Nehra (IND) | 15:34.71 | |
| 13 | B | Robert Bonsall (BRN) | 15:34.88 | |
| 14 | B | Muhammad Dhuha Zulfikry (MAS) | 15:38.23 | |
| 15 | B | Eric Q Chen (HKG) | 15:47.74 | |
| 16 | C | Ratthawit Thammananthachote (THA) | 15:54.53 | |
| 17 | C | Nicholas James Tan (SGP) | 15:57.59 | |
| 18 | C | Daniel Nasredinov (KGZ) | 16:03.92 | |
| 19 | C | Wang Yi Shun (HKG) | 16:58.28 | |
| 20 | C | Mateen M Sediq (AFG) | 16:58.48 | |
| 21 | C | Byambajargal Pagva (MGL) | 17:47.51 | |
| 22 | C | Nomuuntugs Gantugs (MGL) | 18:19.97 | |
| | B | Nguyễn Huy Hoàng (VIE) | DNS | |
