= Swimming at the 2022 Asian Games – Men's 800 metre freestyle =

Men's 800 metre freestyle at the 2022 Asian Games
- Venue: Hangzhou Olympic Expo Aquatics Center
- Date: 28 September 2023
- Competitors: 19 from 12 nations

Medalists
| gold medal | Kim Woo-min | South Korea |
| silver medal | Fei Liwei | China |
| bronze medal | Nguyễn Huy Hoàng | Vietnam |

The men's 800 metre freestyle event at the 2022 Asian Games took place on 28 September 2023 at the Hangzhou Olympic Expo Center.

== Schedule ==
All times are China Standard Time (UTC+08:00)

| Date | Time | Event |
|---|---|---|
| Thursday, 28 September 2023 | 10:55 | Slow heats |
| Thursday, 28 September 2023 | 20:16 | Fast heat |

== Records ==
Prior to this competition, the existing world, Asian and Games records were as follows.

| World Record | Zhang Lin (CHN) | 7:32.12 | Rome, Italy | 29 July 2009 |
| Asian Record | Zhang Lin (CHN) | 7:32.12 | Rome, Italy | 29 July 2009 |
| Games Record | Sun Yang (CHN) | 7:48.36 | Jakarta, Indonesia | 20 August 2018 |

== Results ==
| Rank | Heat | Athlete | Time | Notes |
|---|---|---|---|---|
| 1st place, gold medalist(s) | 3 | Kim Woo-min (KOR) | 7:46.03 | GR |
| 2nd place, silver medalist(s) | 3 | Fei Liwei (CHN) | 7:49.90 | |
| 3rd place, bronze medalist(s) | 3 | Nguyễn Huy Hoàng (VIE) | 7:51.44 | |
| 4 | 3 | Liu Peixin (CHN) | 7:53.18 | |
| 5 | 3 | Shogo Takeda (JPN) | 7:54.49 | |
| 6 | 3 | Kaito Tabuchi (JPN) | 8:02.00 | |
| 7 | 3 | Aryan Nehra (IND) | 8:04.06 | |
| 8 | 2 | Ratthawit Thammananthachote (THA) | 8:07.17 | |
| 9 | 1 | Jerald Lium (SGP) | 8:12.61 | |
| 10 | 2 | Glen Lim (SGP) | 8:12.72 | |
| 11 | 3 | Kushagra Rawat (IND) | 8:14.01 | |
| 12 | 2 | Karel Subagyo (INA) | 8:21.04 | |
| 13 | 2 | Sauod Al-Shamroukh (KUW) | 8:30.62 | |
| 14 | 2 | He Shing Ip (HKG) | 8:35.35 | |
| 15 | 2 | Kwok Chun Hei (HKG) | 8:39.53 | |
| 16 | 2 | Mohamed Ismail (QAT) | 9:13.14 | |
| 17 | 1 | Düürenbayaryn Törmönkh (MGL) | 9:14.07 | |
| 18 | 1 | Gongoryn Maidar (MGL) | 9:14.20 | |
| 19 | 2 | Ahmed Diab (QAT) | 9:28.78 | |
