= 2024 World Aquatics Swimming Championships (25 m) – Men's 4 × 200 metre freestyle relay =

Swimming competition

Men's 4 × 200 metre freestyle relay at the 2024 World Aquatics Swimming Championships (25 m)
- Venue: Duna Arena
- Location: Budapest, Hungary
- Dates: 13 December (heats and final)
- Competitors: 65 from 14 nations
- Teams: 14
- Winning time: 6:40.51 WR

Medalists
gold medal	Luke Hobson; Carson Foster; Shaine Casas; Kieran Smith; Trenton Julian; Daniel Matheson	United States
silver medal	Maximillian Giuliani; Edward Sommerville; Harrison Turner; Elijah Winnington; David Schlicht	Australia
bronze medal	Filippo Megli; Manuel Frigo; Carlos D'Ambrosio; Alberto Razzetti; Davide Dalla Costa; Alessandro Ragaini	Italy

The men's 4 × 200 metre freestyle relay event at the 2024 World Aquatics Swimming Championships (25 m) was held on 13 December 2024 at the Duna Arena in Budapest, Hungary.

== Records ==
Prior to the competition, the existing world and championship records were as follows:

World record	United States (USA)	6:44.12	Melbourne, Australia	16 December 2022
Competition record	United States (USA)	6:44.12	Melbourne, Australia	16 December 2022

The following records were established during the competition:

Date	Event	Name	Nation	Time	Record
13 December	Final	Luke Hobson (1:38.91) WR; Carson Foster (1:40.77); Shaine Casas (1:40.34); Kieran Smith (1:40.49)	United States	6:40.51	WR

== Results ==
=== Heats ===
The heats were started at 10:38.

Rank	Heat	Lane	Nation	Swimmers	Time	Notes
1	2	4	United States	Shaine Casas (1:40.88); Trenton Julian (1:42.39); Daniel Matheson (1:45.53); Kieran Smith (1:42.89)	6:51.69	Q
2	2	5	Australia	Elijah Winnington (1:43.29); David Schlicht (1:45.17); Harrison Turner (1:43.03); Edward Sommerville (1:42.01)	6:53.50	Q
3	1	5	Italy	Filippo Megli (1:42.95); Manuel Frigo (1:42.86); Davide Dalla Costa (1:43.89); Alessandro Ragaini (1:44.19)	6:53.89	Q
4	1	4	China	Tao Guannan (1:43.74); Xu Yizhou (1:43.04); Liu Wudi (1:43.98); He Yubo (1:45.20)	6:55.96	Q
5	2	2	Spain	Luis Domínguez (1:43.39); Miguel Pérez-Godoy (1:44.13); Nacho Campos (1:44.35); Sergio de Celis (1:44.17)	6:56.04	Q
6	2	3	Germany	Rafael Miroslaw (1:43.57); Florian Wellbrock (1:44.48); Timo Sorgius (1:43.89); Cedric Büssing (1:45.24)	6:57.18	Q
7	2	8	Neutral Athletes B	Dmitrii Zhavoronkov (1:44.12); Savelii Luzin (1:45.19); Aleksei Sudarev (1:44.23); Ilya Borodin (1:44.05)	6:57.59	Q
8	1	2	Canada	Tristan Jankovics (1:44.21); Alexander Axon (1:43.43); Blake Tierney (1:44.48); Timothé Barbeau (1:45.66)	6:57.78	Q, WD
9	1	3	Japan	Tatsuya Murasa (1:43.75); Kazushi Imafuku (1:47.34); Kaito Tabuchi (1:45.47); Daiki Yanagawa (1:44.67)	7:01.23	Q
10	1	6	Hungary	Attila Kovács (1:45.32); Balázs Holló (1:45.72); Richárd Márton (1:44.23); Olivér Pápai (1:46.29)	7:01.56	NR
11	2	7	Malaysia	Khiew Hoe Yean (1:45.39); Lim Yin Chuen (1:45.72); Muhd Dhuha Bin Zulfikry (1:45.89); Terence Ng (1:46.62)	7:03.62	NR
12	1	7	Slovakia	Jakub Poliačik (1:45.48); Matej Martinovič (1:46.13); Martin Perečinský (1:47.97); František Jablčník (1:46.75)	7:06.33	NR
13	1	1	Czech Republic	Jakub Bursa (1:46.85); Miroslav Knedla (1:48.92); Jan Čejka (1:46.79); Ondřej Gemov (1:43.86)	7:06.42	
14	2	1	Hong Kong	He Shing Ip (1:48.93); Wang Yi Shun (1:50.71); Adam Chillingworth (1:51.75); Hayden Kwan (1:47.33)	7:18.72	NR

=== Final ===
The final was held at 19:36.

Rank	Lane	Nation	Swimmers	Time	Notes
1st place, gold medalist(s)	4	United States	Luke Hobson (1:38.91) WR; Carson Foster (1:40.77); Shaine Casas (1:40.34); Kieran Smith (1:40.49)	6:40.51	WR
2nd place, silver medalist(s)	5	Australia	Maximillian Giuliani (1:40.73); Edward Sommerville (1:41.03); Harrison Turner (1:42.21); Elijah Winnington (1:41.57)	6:45.54	OC
3rd place, bronze medalist(s)	3	Italy	Filippo Megli (1:42.26); Manuel Frigo (1:42.15); Carlos D'Ambrosio (1:41.48); Alberto Razzetti (1:41.62)	6:47.51	NR
4	7	Germany	Rafael Miroslaw (1:41.25); Kaii Winkler (1:42.32); Timo Sorgius (1:41.87); Florian Wellbrock (1:44.99)	6:50.43	NR
5	2	Spain	Luis Domínguez (1:43.17); Miguel Pérez-Godoy (1:42.66); Nacho Campos (1:43.84); Sergio de Celis (1:43.07)	6:52.74	NR
6	1	Neutral Athletes B	Dmitrii Zhavoronkov (1:44.50); Aleksandr Shchegolev (1:42.96); Aleksei Sudarev (1:44.14); Roman Akimov (1:42.29)	6:53.89	
7	6	China	Tao Guannan (1:42.76); Xu Yizhou (1:43.46); Liu Wudi (1:43.49); He Yubo (1:44.85)	6:54.56	
8	8	Japan	Tatsuya Murasa (1:43.04); Kazushi Imafuku (1:48.56); Kaito Tabuchi (1:48.82); Daiki Yanagawa (1:47.48)	7:07.90	
