= Swimming at the 2026 Asian Games – Men's 800 metre freestyle =

Men's 800 metre freestyle at the 2026 Asian Games
- Venue: Tokyo Aquatics Centre
- Date: 24 September 2026
- Competitors: 24 from 17 nations

Medalists
gold medal	Zhang Zhanshuo	China
silver medal	Kaito Tabuchi	Japan
silver medal	Kim Jun-woo	South Korea

The men's 800 metre freestyle event at the 2026 Asian Games took place on 24 September 2026 at the Tokyo Aquatics Centre. China's Zhang Zhanshuo won the gold in an Asian Games record time of 7:42.49. South Korea's Kim Jun-woo and Japan's Kaito Tabuchi shared the silver medal after recording identical times of 7:43.86, with Kim winning his first individual medal at the Asian Games.

== Schedule ==
All times are Japan Standard Time (UTC+09:00)

Date	Time	Event
Thursday, 24 September 2026	10:40	Slow heats
Thursday, 24 September 2026	17:45	Fastest heat

== Records ==
Prior to this competition, the existing world, Asian and Games records were as follows.

World Record	Zhang Lin (CHN)	7:32.12	Rome, Italy	29 July 2009
Asian Record	Zhang Lin (CHN)	7:32.12	Rome, Italy	29 July 2009
Games Record	Kim Woo-min (KOR)	7:46.03	Hangzhou, China	23 September 2023

== Results ==
=== Final ===
Rank	Heat	Athlete	Time	Notes
1st place, gold medalist(s)	A	Zhang Zhanshuo (CHN)	7:42.49	GR
2nd place, silver medalist(s)	A	Kaito Tabuchi (JPN)	7:43.86	NR
2nd place, silver medalist(s)	A	Kim Jun-woo (KOR)	7:43.86	
4	A	Kazushi Imafuku (JPN)	7:47.85	
5	A	Ilya Sibirtsev (UZB)	7:51.09	
6	A	Fei Liwei (CHN)	7:53.28	
7	B	Nguyễn Huy Hoàng (VIE)	7:57.39	
8	B	Trần Văn Nguyễn Quốc (VIE)	8:00.89	
9	A	Rami Bilal A Alrahmouni (KSA)	8:01.05	
10	A	Saadeddin Saadeddin (QAT)	8:01.43	
11	B	Aryan Nehra (IND)	8:02.52	
12	B	Russel Pang (SGP)	8:07.50	
13	B	Chen Eric Q (HKG)	8:09.28	
14	B	Muhammad Dhuha Zulfikry (MAS)	8:13.30	
15	B	Robert Bonsall (BRN)	8:13.33	
16	C	Ratthawit Thammananthachote (THA)	8:15.63	
17	C	Nicholas James Tan (SGP)	8:19.36	
18	C	Fedor Didenko (KAZ)	8:22.35	
19	C	Daniel Nasredinov (KGZ)	8:24.55	
20	C	Wang Yi Shun (HKG)	8:43.16	
21	C	Mateen A M Sediq (AFG)	8:55.46	
22	C	Byambajargal Pagva (MGL)	9:07.56	
23	C	Turmunkh Duurenbayar (MGL)	9:24.79	
	A	Kim Woo-min (KOR)	DNS	
