= Swimming at the 2022 Asian Games – Men's 1500 metre freestyle =

Men's 1500 metre freestyle at the 2022 Asian Games
- Venue: Hangzhou Olympic Expo Aquatics Center
- Date: 26 September 2023
- Competitors: 14 from 10 nations

Medalists
gold medal	Fei Liwei	China
silver medal	Kim Woo-min	South Korea
bronze medal	Shogo Takeda	Japan

The men's 1500 metre freestyle event at the 2022 Asian Games took place on 26 September 2023 at the Hangzhou Olympic Expo Center.

== Schedule ==
All times are China Standard Time (UTC+08:00)

Date	Time	Event
Tuesday, 26 September 2023	10:51	Slow heat
Tuesday, 26 September 2023	19:54	Fast heat

== Records ==
Prior to this competition, the existing world, Asian and Games records were as follows.

World Record	Sun Yang (CHN)	14:31.02	London, United Kingdom	4 August 2012
Asian Record	Sun Yang (CHN)	14:31.02	London, United Kingdom	4 August 2012
Games Record	Sun Yang (CHN)	14:35.43	Guangzhou, China	18 November 2010

== Results ==
Rank	Heat	Athlete	Time	Notes
1st place, gold medalist(s)	2	Fei Liwei (CHN)	14:55.47	
2nd place, silver medalist(s)	2	Kim Woo-min (KOR)	15:01.07	
3rd place, bronze medalist(s)	2	Shogo Takeda (JPN)	15:03.29	
4	2	Nguyễn Huy Hoàng (VIE)	15:04.06	
5	2	Wang Ziyang (CHN)	15:12.49	
6	2	Ikki Imoto (JPN)	15:14.27	
7	2	Aryan Nehra (IND)	15:20.91	
8	1	Ratthawit Thammananthachote (THA)	15:35.48	
9	2	Kushagra Rawat (IND)	15:44.61	
10	1	Kwok Chun Hei (HKG)	16:21.69	
11	1	He Shing Ip (HKG)	16:21.74	
12	1	Karel Subagyo (INA)	16:40.67	
13	1	Abdulla Al-Khaldi (QAT)	17:21.61	
14	1	Düürenbayaryn Törmönkh (MGL)	17:49.67	
