= Swimming at the 2024 Summer Olympics – Men's 400-metre freestyle =

Men's 400 metre freestyle at the Games of the XXXIII Olympiad
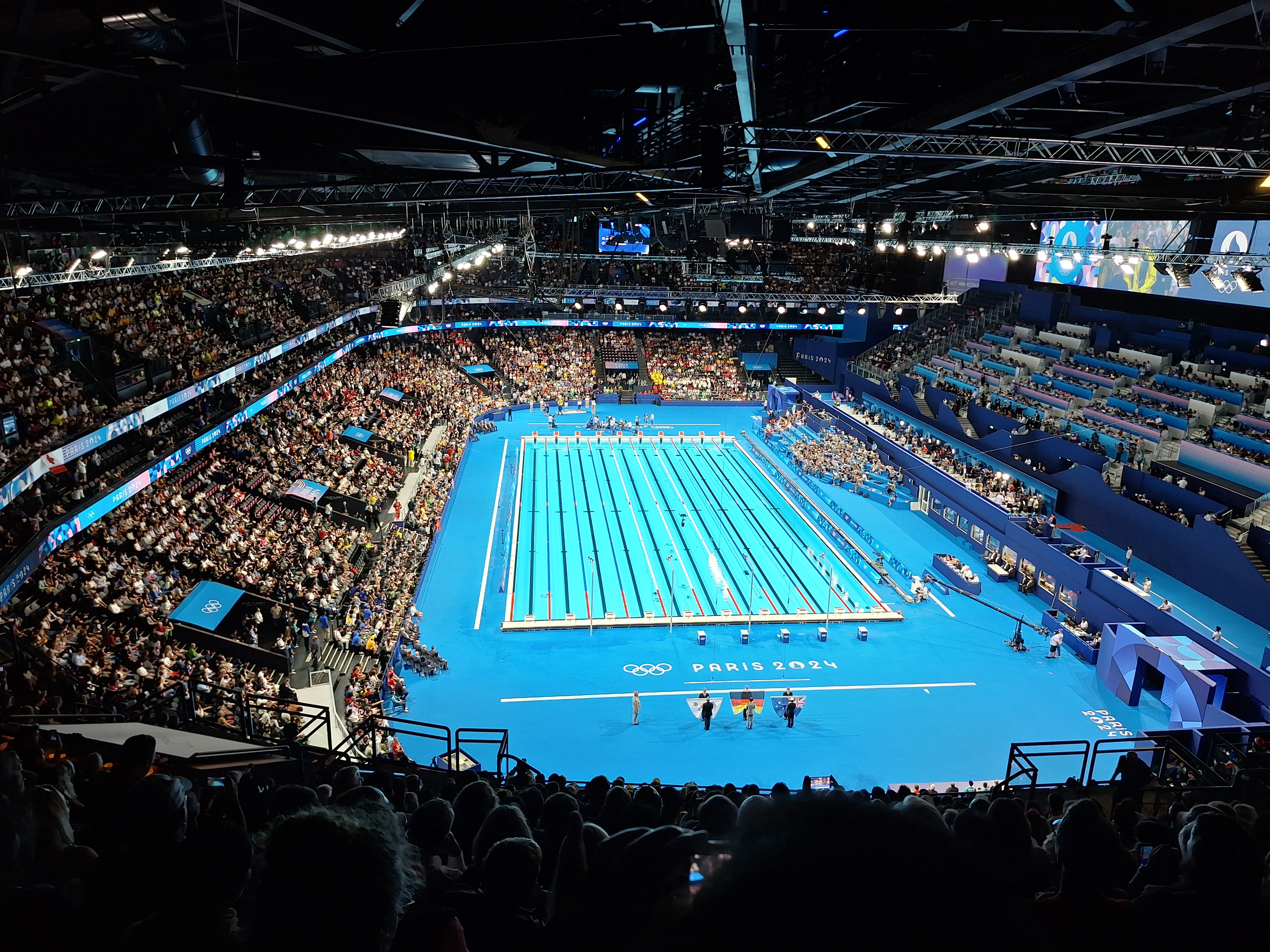
- Paris La Défense Arena after it was converted to a swimming pool for the swimming events
- Venue: Paris La Défense Arena
- Dates: 27 July 2024 (Heats); 27 July 2024 (Final)
- Competitors: 37 from 31 nations
- Winning time: 3:41.78

Medalists
1st place, gold medalist(s)		Lukas Märtens	Germany
2nd place, silver medalist(s)		Elijah Winnington	Australia
3rd place, bronze medalist(s)		Kim Woo-min	South Korea

The men's 400 metre freestyle event at the 2024 Summer Olympics was held on 27 July 2024 at Paris La Défense Arena, which was converted to a swimming pool for the swimming events.

Going into the event, Germany's Lukas Märtens was the favourite, while South Korean Kim Woo-min and Australians Elijah Winnington and Samuel Short were also among the top contenders. In the final, Märtens led from beginning to end to take gold with a time of 3:41.78, while Winnington took silver and Kim took bronze. The win earned Märtens the first swimming gold medal of the games.

National records for Guyana and Chile were broken during the heats, and in the final Brazil's Guilherme Costa set a new Americas record of 3:42.76.

== Background ==
Tunisia's defending Olympic champion and silver medallist at the 2023 World Championships, Ahmed Hafnaoui, withdrew from the Games due to an undisclosed injury. South Korean Kim Woo-min won the event at the 2024 World Championships, while Lukas Märtens of Germany had swum over a second faster than anyone else that year. Australians Elijah Winnington and Samuel Short won the event at the 2022 and 2023 World Championships, respectively, and they also held 2024's second- and third-fastest times. Both SwimSwam and Swimming World also considered Brazil's Guilherme Costa, Germany's Oliver Klemet and Austria's Felix Auböck as contenders. They also both predicted that Short would win gold and Märtens would take silver.

Prior to the event, the world record was 3:40.07, set by Paul Biedermann of Germany in 2009. The Olympic record was 3:40.14, set by Sun Yang of China in 2012.

The event was held at Paris La Défense Arena, which was converted to a swimming pool for the swimming events.

== Qualification ==
Each National Olympic Committee (NOC) was permitted to enter a maximum of two qualified athletes in each individual event, but only if both of them had attained the Olympic Qualifying Time (OQT). For this event, the OQT was 3:46.78. World Aquatics then considered athletes qualifying through universality; NOCs were given one event entry for each gender, which could be used by any athlete regardless of qualification time, providing the spaces had not already been taken by athletes from that nation who had achieved the OQT. Finally, the rest of the spaces were filled by athletes who had met the Olympic Consideration Time (OCT), which was 3:47.91 for this event. In total, 23 athletes qualified through achieving the OQT, 13 athletes qualified through universality places and two athletes qualified through achieving the OCT.

Top 10 fastest qualification times
Swimmer	Country	Time	Competition
Lukas Märtens	Germany	3:40.33	2024 German Championships
Samuel Short	Australia	3:40.68	2023 World Aquatics Championships
Elijah Winnington	Australia	3:41.41	2024 Australian Championships
Kim Woo-min	South Korea	3:42.42	2024 Mare Nostrum Monte Carlo
Oliver Klemet	Germany	3:42.81	2024 Gothaer & Friends Meet
Guilherme Costa	Brazil	3:43.58	2023 World Aquatics Championships
Felix Auböck	Austria	3:44.14	2023 World Aquatics Championships
Antonio Djakovic	Switzerland	3:44.22	2023 World Aquatics Championships
Petar Mitsin	Bulgaria	3:44.31	2023 European Junior Championships
Lucas Henveaux	Belgium	3:44.61	2023 World Aquatics Championships

== Heats ==
Five heats (preliminary rounds) took place on 27 July 2024, starting at 11:45. (Note: All times are Central European Summer Time (UTC+2)) The swimmers with the best eight times in the heats advanced to the final. Guyana's Raekwon Noel beat his own national record in the first heat, setting it at 4:02.29. Eduardo Cisternas from Chile also lowered his national record by over two and a half seconds to 3:51.29. Austria's Felix Auböck did not qualify.

Results
Rank	Heat	Lane	Swimmer	Nation	Time	Notes
1	5	4	Lukas Märtens	Germany	3:44.13	Q
2	4	3	Guilherme Costa	Brazil	3:44.23	Q
3	3	3	Fei Liwei	China	3:44.60	Q
4	5	5	Elijah Winnington	Australia	3:44.87	Q
5	4	4	Samuel Short	Australia	3:44.88	Q
6	4	1	Aaron Shackell	United States	3:45.45	Q
7	4	5	Kim Woo-min	South Korea	3:45.52	Q
8	5	3	Oliver Klemet	Germany	3:45.75	Q
9	3	5	Ahmed Jaouadi	Tunisia	3:46.19	
10	4	7	Danas Rapšys	Lithuania	3:46.27	
11	4	8	Kieran Smith	United States	3:46.47	
12	5	1	Zhang Zhanshuo	China	3:46.76	
12	4	2	Lucas Henveaux	Belgium	3:46.76	
14	3	8	Zalán Sárkány	Hungary	3:47.33	
15	3	7	David Aubry	France	3:47.53	
16	5	8	Kieran Bird	Great Britain	3:47.54	
17	5	7	Marco De Tullio	Italy	3:47.90	
18	3	4	Victor Johansson	Sweden	3:47.98	
19	3	1	Alfonso Mestre	Venezuela	3:48.20	
20	3	6	Matteo Lamberti	Italy	3:48.38	
21	5	2	Petar Mitsin	Bulgaria	3:49.30	
22	2	5	Kregor Zirk	Estonia	3:49.59	
23	4	6	Antonio Djakovic	Switzerland	3:49.77	
24	5	6	Felix Auböck	Austria	3:50.50	
25	2	7	Eduardo Cisternas	Chile	3:51.29	NR
26	2	3	Ilia Sibirtsev	Uzbekistan	3:51.52	
27	2	4	Khiew Hoe Yean	Malaysia	3:51.66	
28	3	2	Eduardo Moraes	Brazil	3:51.74	
29	2	2	Joaquín Vargas	Peru	3:54.59	
30	2	6	Jovan Lekić	Bosnia and Herzegovina	3:57.90	
31	2	8	Pavel Alovațki	Moldova	3:59.77	
32	2	1	Loris Bianchi	San Marino	4:01.13	
33	1	5	Ilias el Fallaki	Morocco	4:01.59	
34	1	3	Raekwon Noel	Guyana	4:02.29	NR
35	1	6	Alberto Vega	Costa Rica	4:03.14	
36	1	2	Ridhwan Abubakar	Kenya	4:05.14	
37	1	4	Nikola Ǵuretanoviḱ	North Macedonia	4:05.38	

== Final ==
The final took place at 20:42 on 27 July. Germany's Lukas Märtens led the race from beginning to end, with both Märtens and South Korean Kim Woo-min splitting below Paul Biedermann's world record pace. (Note: Biedermann set the world record of 3:40.07 at the 2009 World Championships, during the supersuit era. Upon winning the race but not breaking the world record, Märtens said "A lot of people expected the record to fall — I don't give a shit, I am on top now".) Through the rest of the race, Märtens held on for gold with a time of 3:41.78 while Australia's Elijah Winnington overtook Kim to take silver with 3:42.21. Kim took the bronze with 3:42.50. Brazil's Guilherme Costa set a new Americas record of 3:42.76, beating Larsen Jensen's 16-year-old time of 3:42.78. The win earned Märtens the first swimming gold medal of the games.

Results
Rank	Lane	Swimmer	Nation	Time	Notes
1st place, gold medalist(s)	4	Lukas Märtens	Germany	3:41.78	
2nd place, silver medalist(s)	6	Elijah Winnington	Australia	3:42.21	
3rd place, bronze medalist(s)	1	Kim Woo-min	South Korea	3:42.50	
4	2	Samuel Short	Australia	3:42.64	
5	5	Guilherme Costa	Brazil	3:42.76	AM
6	3	Fei Liwei	China	3:44.24	
7	8	Oliver Klemet	Germany	3:46.59	
8	7	Aaron Shackell	United States	3:47.00	

Statistics
Name	100 metre split	200 metre split	300 metre split	Time	Stroke rate (strokes/min)
Lukas Märtens	52.01	1:48.40	2:45.26	3:41.78	40.9
Elijah Winnington	52.78	1:49.18	2:46.44	3:42.21	42.4
Kim Woo-min	52.50	1:48.71	2:45.87	3:42.50	40.0
Samuel Short	53.34	1:49.11	2:46.22	3:42.64	44.6
Guilherme Costa	53.61	1:50.25	2:47.27	3:42.76	46.8
Fei Liwei	53.23	1:50.29	2:47.96	3:44.24	36.4
Oliver Klemet	54.32	1:51.22	2:48.93	3:46.59	45.5
Aaron Shackell	53.81	1:51.66	2:49.71	3:47.00	38.6
