= Swimming at the 2026 Asian Games – Men's 400 metre freestyle =

Men's 400 metre freestyle at the 2026 Asian Games
- Venue: Tokyo Aquatics Centre
- Date: 25 September 2026
- Competitors: 28 from 19 nations

Medalists
gold medal	Zhang Zhanshuo	China
silver medal	Kazushi Imafuku	Japan
bronze medal	Fei Liwei	China

The men's 400 metre freestyle event at the 2026 Asian Games was held on 25 September 2026 at the Tokyo Aquatics Centre. China's Zhang Zhanshuo won the gold medal in a Games-record time of 3:41.28, finishing 4.27 seconds ahead of Japan's silver medallist Kazushi Imafuku.

== Schedule ==
All times are Japan Standard Time (UTC+09:00)

Date	Time	Event
Friday, 25 September 2026	11:06	Heats
Friday, 25 September 2026	17:52	Final

== Records ==
Prior to this competition, the existing world, Asian and Games records were as follows.

World Record	Lukas Märtens (GER)	3:39.96	Stockholm, Sweden	12 April 2025
Asian Record	Sun Yang (CHN)	3:40.14	London, United Kingdom	28 July 2012
Games Record	Park Tae-hwan (KOR)	3:41.53	Guangzhou, China	16 November 2010

== Results ==
=== Heats ===
Rank	Heat	Athlete	Time	Notes
1	2	Ilya Sibirtsev (UZB)	3:50.32	Q
2	2	Kazushi Imafuku (JPN)	3:50.58	Q
3	2	Nguyễn Huy Hoàng (VIE)	3:50.65	Q
4	3	Zhang Zhanshuo (CHN)	3:51.10	Q
5	3	Tatsuya Murasa (JPN)	3:51.51	Q
6	2	Trần Văn Nguyễn Quốc (VIE)	3:51.88	Q
7	3	Fei Liwei (CHN)	3:52.33	Q
8	3	Rami Bilal A Alrahmouni (KSA)	3:52.80	Q
9	1	Lee Ho-joon (KOR)	3:54.12	Q
10	3	Saadeddin Saadeddin (QAT)	3:55.48	Q
11	2	Russel Pang (SGP)	3:55.96	Reserve
12	3	Gian Santos (PHI)	3:56.27	Reserve
13	2	Khiew Hoe Yean (MAS)	3:56.94	
14	3	Robert Bonsall (BRN)	3:57.73	
15	2	Made Aubrey Jaya (INA)	3:57.94	
16	2	Muhammad Dhuha Zulfikry (MAS)	3:58.06	
17	3	Aneesh Sunil (IND)	3:58.08	
18	1	Dhakshan Shashikumar (IND)	3:58.73	
19	1	Fedor Didenko (KAZ)	3:59.14	
20	1	Ratthawit Thammananthachote (THA)	3:59.24	
21	1	Ian Leong (SGP)	4:01.48	
22	3	Lai King Wo Barry (HKG)	4:02.98	
23	1	Saoud Alshamroukh (KUW)	4:05.57	
24	3	Mohammad Ghasemi (IRI)	4:05.87	
25	1	Daniel Nasredinov (KGZ)	4:06.42	
26	2	Wang Yi Shun (HKG)	4:07.72	
27	1	Maidar Gongor (MGL)	4:26.15	
28	1	Enkhbat Makhbal (MGL)	4:41.63	

=== Final ===
Rank	Athlete	Time	Notes
1st place, gold medalist(s)	Zhang Zhanshuo (CHN)	3:41.28	GR
2nd place, silver medalist(s)	Kazushi Imafuku (JPN)	3:45.55	
3rd place, bronze medalist(s)	Fei Liwei (CHN)	3:45.78	
4	Nguyễn Huy Hoàng (VIE)	3:48.86	
5	Ilya Sibirtsev (UZB)	3:49.35	
6	Saadeddin Saadeddin (QAT)	3:49.71	NR
7	Rami Bilal A Alrahmouni (KSA)	3:50.29	
8	Trần Văn Nguyễn Quốc (VIE)	3:50.77	
9	Lee Ho-joon (KOR)	3:51.18	
10	Tatsuya Murasa (JPN)	3:52.21	
