= Swimming at the 2026 Asian Games – Men's 4 × 200 metre freestyle relay =

Men's 4 × 200 metre freestyle relay at the 2026 Asian Games
- Venue: Tokyo Aquatics Centre
- Date: 21 September 2026
- Competitors: 52 from 13 nations

Medalists
gold medal	China; Xu Haibo, Fei Liwei, Pan Zhanle, Zhang Zhanshuo, Wang Haoyu, Zhao Jiayue, Wang Shun
silver medal	Japan; Tatsuya Murasa, Katsuhiro Matsumoto, Kazushi Imafuku, Kazusa Kuroda, Konosuke Yanagimoto, Tomoyuki Matsushita
bronze medal	South Korea; Kim Jun-woo, Kim Woo-min, Lee Ho-joon, Hwang Sun-woo, Kim Min-seop, Yang Jae-hoon

The men's 4 × 200 metre freestyle relay event at the 2026 Asian Games took place on 21 September 2026 at the Tokyo Aquatics Centre. China won the gold medal in an Asian and Asian Games record time of 7:00.17. China trailed Japan by 1.89 seconds entering the final leg, but Zhang Zhanshuo anchored the team in 1:42.92, the fastest relay split in history, to overtake Japan on the final lap. Japan won the silver medal in a national record time of 7:01.05, while the defending champions South Korea took bronze in 7:06.76.

== Schedule ==
All times are Japan Standard Time (UTC+09:00)

Date	Time	Event
Monday, 21 September 2026	11:04	Heats
Monday, 21 September 2026	18:13	Final

== Records ==
Prior to this competition, the existing world, Asian and Games records were as follows.

World Record	United States	6:58.55	Rome, Italy	31 July 2009
Asian Record	China	7:00.91	Singapore	1 August 2025
Games Record	South Korea	7:01.73	Hangzhou, China	25 September 2023

== Results ==
=== Heats ===
Rank	Heat	Team	Time	Notes
1	2	China (CHN)	7:11.70	Q
		Xu Haibo	1:48.72	
		Zhao Jiayue	1:47.52	
		Wang Haoyu	1:48.42	
		Wang Shun	1:47.04	
2	2	Japan (JPN)	7:13.02	Q
		Konosuke Yanagimoto	1:48.32	
		Tatsuya Murasa	1:47.58	
		Kazushi Imafuku	1:48.70	
		Kazusa Kuroda	1:48.42	
3	1	South Korea (KOR)	7:14.35	Q
		Kim Min-seop	1:49.05	
		Yang Jae-hoon	1:48.25	
		Kim Jun-woo	1:47.49	
		Lee Ho-joon	1:49.56	
4	1	Vietnam (VIE)	7:21.62	Q
		Trần Hưng Nguyễn	1:49.43	
		Nguyễn Việt Tường	1:51.88	
		Nguyễn Huy Hoàng	1:50.45	
		Trần Văn Nguyễn Quốc	1:49.86	
5	1	Singapore (SGP)	7:22.73	Q
		Glen Jun Wei Lim	1:50.39	
		Yan Xi Brandon Yap	1:52.19	
		Russel Pang	1:51.21	
		Ardi Zulhilmi Bin Mohamed Azman	1:48.94	
6	2	Malaysia (MAS)	7:22.05	Q
		Hoe Yean Khiew	1:49.58	
		Yin Chuen Lim	1:50.25	
		Khai Xin Tan	1:52.07	
		Arvin Singh	1:50.15	
7	2	Thailand (THA)	7:23.97	Q, NR
		Pongpanod Trithan	1:50.94	
		Wongsakorn Patsamarn	1:51.57	
		Tonnam Kanteemool	1:50.88	
		Surasit Thongdeang	1:50.58	
8	2	Qatar (QAT)	7:24.10	Q, NR
		Saadeddin Saadeddin	1:49.78	
		Ali Hassan	1:48.93	
		Emile Fouzai	1:52.05	
		Mohamed Mohamed	1:53.34	
9	2	India (IND)	7:24.32	Reserve
		Aneesh Sunil	1:51.26	
		Sajan Prakash	1:51.28	
		Vedaant Madhavan	1:50.33	
		Dhakshan Shashikumar	1:51.45	
10	1	Kazakhstan (KAZ)	7:30.28	Reserve
		Maxim Klimenko	1:51.33	
		Maxim Skazobtsov	1:52.11	
		Alexandr Rumynskiy	1:53.81	
		Fedor Didenko	1:53.03	
11	1	Hong Kong (HKG)	7:30.83	
		Wan Chun Lim	1:54.16	
		Lai King Wo Barry	1:53.08	
		Lo Tsz Lam	1:51.81	
		Nicholas Kwan	1:51.78	
12	1	Indonesia (INA)	7:31.66	
		Liquor Harrison Andoko	1:50.66	
		Made Aubrey Jaya	1:51.51	
		Samuel Septionus	1:54.78	
		Kevin Prayitno	1:54.71	
13	1	Mongolia (MGL)	8:10.37	NR
		Enkhtamir Batbayar	1:52.54	
		Maidar Gongor	2:04.90	
		Sugar Ganzorigt	2:06.71	
		Ninjin Enkhbaatar	2:06.22	

=== Final ===
Rank	Team	Time	Notes
1st place, gold medalist(s)	China (CHN)	7:00.17	AR
	Xu Haibo	1:46.27	
	Fei Liwei	1:46.74	
	Pan Zhanle	1:44.24	
	Zhang Zhanshuo	1:42.92	
2nd place, silver medalist(s)	Japan (JPN)	7:01.05	NR
	Tatsuya Murasa	1:44.70	
	Katsuhiro Matsumoto	1:44.84	
	Kazusa Kuroda	1:45.82	
	Tomoyuki Matsushita	1:45.69	
3rd place, bronze medalist(s)	South Korea (KOR)	7:06.76	
	Kim Jun-woo	1:47.16	
	Kim Woo-min	1:46.16	
	Lee Ho-joon	1:47.57	
	Hwang Sun-woo	1:45.87	
4	Vietnam (VIE)	7:18.09	
	Trần Hưng Nguyễn	1:49.48	
	Nguyễn Việt Tường	1:50.29	
	Nguyễn Huy Hoàng	1:50.45	
	Trần Văn Nguyễn Quốc	1:47.87	
5	Malaysia (MAS)	7:18.79	
	Hoe Yean Khiew	1:48.73	
	Arvin Singh	1:49.01	
	Yin Chuen Lim	1:50.16	
	Khai Xin Tan	1:50.89	
6	Qatar (QAT)	7:20.25	NR
	Saadeddin Saadeddin	1:50.14	
	Emile Fouzai	1:50.94	
	Mohamed Mohamed	1:50.61	
	Ali Hassan	1:48.56	
7	Thailand (THA)	7:21.08	NR
	Pongpanod Trithan	1:49.51	
	Wongsakorn Patsamarn	1:50.86	
	Tonnam Kanteemool	1:50.64	
	Surasit Thongdeang	1:50.07	
8	Singapore (SGP)	7:24.22	
	Ardi Zulhilmi Bin Mohamed Azman	1:50.42	
	Glen Jun Wei Lim	1:49.73	
	Yan Xi Brandon Yap	1:51.73	
	Wei Sheng Ian Leong	1:52.34	
