= Swimming at the 2026 Asian Games – Women's 200 metre backstroke =

Women's 200 metre backstroke at the 2026 Asian Games
- Venue: Tokyo Aquatics Centre
- Date: 22 September 2026
- Competitors: 21 from 15 nations

Medalists
gold medal	Peng Xuwei	China
silver medal	Sun Mingxia	China
bronze medal	Rio Shirai	Japan

The women's 200 metre backstroke event at the 2026 Asian Games took place on 22 September 2026 at the Tokyo Aquatics Centre. China's Peng Xuwei, the reigning champion, successfully defended her title in an Asian record time of 2:05.77, finishing almost three seconds ahead of compatriot Sun Mingxia, who won the silver medal in 2:08.65. Peng's time broke the previous Asian record of 2:06.46, set by China's Zhao Jing at the 2010 Asian Games, and made her the first Asian woman to swim the event in under 2:06.

== Schedule ==
All times are Japan Standard Time (UTC+09:00)

Date	Time	Event
Tuesday, 22 September 2026	10:30	Heats
Tuesday, 22 September 2026	17:20	Final

== Records ==
Prior to this competition, the existing world, Asian and Games records were as follows.

World Record	Kaylee McKeown (AUS)	2:03.14	Sydney, Australia	10 March 2023
Asian Record	Zhao Jing (CHN)	2:06.46	Guangzhou, China	14 November 2010
Games Record	Zhao Jing (CHN)	2:06.46	Guangzhou, China	14 November 2010

== Results ==
=== Heats ===
Rank	Heat	Athlete	Time	Notes
1	3	Peng Xuwei (CHN)	2:09.38	Q
2	3	Rio Shirai (JPN)	2:10.66	Q
3	1	Lee Eun-ji (KOR)	2:11.61	Q
4	2	Sun Mingxia (CHN)	2:11.69	Q
5	1	Cheung Sum Yuet (HKG)	2:12.54	Q
6	2	Mio Narita (JPN)	2:12.78	Q
7	3	Xeniya Ignatova (KAZ)	2:14.29	Q
8	2	Xiandi Chua (PHI)	2:14.87	Q
9	1	Chang Ya-jia (TPE)	2:15.55	Q
10	2	Mia Millar (THA)	2:16.69	Q
11	3	Julia Shu Ning Yeo (SGP)	2:17.06	Reserve
12	3	Adelia Chantika Aulia (INA)	2:17.14	Reserve
13	2	Sim Levenia Entong (SGP)	2:19.51	
14	3	Wong Un Lao (MAC)	2:20.19	
15	2	Ariuntamir Enkh-amgalan (MGL)	2:20.58	NR
16	1	Chan Tsz Yu Ashley (HKG)	2:20.89	
17	1	Yalindi Minagi Rupesinghe (SRI)	2:22.41	
18	1	Valerie Tarazi (PLE)	2:24.62	NR
19	3	Farah Fares (PLE)	2:29.05	
20	1	Anima Enkhbaatar (MGL)	2:36.78	
21	2	Malaika Linda Imran (MDV)	2:55.31	

=== Final ===
Rank	Athlete	Time	Notes
1st place, gold medalist(s)	Peng Xuwei (CHN)	2:05.77	AR
2nd place, silver medalist(s)	Sun Mingxia (CHN)	2:08.65	
3rd place, bronze medalist(s)	Rio Shirai (JPN)	2:08.70	
4	Lee Eun-ji (KOR)	2:10.47	
5	Cheung Sum Yuet (HKG)	2:12.06	
6	Xeniya Ignatova (KAZ)	2:12.86	
7	Mio Narita (JPN)	2:13.43	
8	Xiandi Chua (PHI)	2:14.20	
9	Chang Ya-jia (TPE)	2:16.11	
10	Mia Millar (THA)	2:16.37	
