= Zhang Zhanshuo =

Chinese swimmer (born 2007)

Personal information
- Nationality: Chinese
- Born: 14 May 2007 (age 19) Qingdao, Shandong, China

Sport
- Sport: Swimming
- Strokes: Freestyle, individual medley
Medal record
Men's swimming
Representing China
World Championships (LC)
Gold medal – first place	2024 Doha	4×100 m freestyle
Gold medal – first place	2024 Doha	4×200 m freestyle
Silver medal – second place	2025 Singapore	4×200 m freestyle
Asian Games
Gold medal – first place	2026 Aichi-Nagoya	200 m freestyle
Gold medal – first place	2026 Aichi-Nagoya	400 m freestyle
Gold medal – first place	2026 Aichi-Nagoya	800 m freestyle
Gold medal – first place	2026 Aichi-Nagoya	1500 m freestyle
Gold medal – first place	2026 Aichi-Nagoya	4×100 m freestyle
Gold medal – first place	2026 Aichi-Nagoya	4×200 m freestyle
Gold medal – first place	2026 Aichi-Nagoya	4×100 m medley
Pan Pacific Championships
Silver medal – second place	2026 Irvine	400 m freestyle
Bronze medal – third place	2026 Irvine	200 m freestyle
World Junior Championships
Silver medal – second place	2023 Netanya	400 m individual medley
Silver medal – second place	2023 Netanya	4×200 m freestyle
Bronze medal – third place	2023 Netanya	800 m freestyle
Bronze medal – third place	2023 Netanya	1500 m freestyle
Bronze medal – third place	2023 Netanya	4×100 m medley

Zhang Zhanshuo (Chinese: 张展硕, Pinyin: Zhāng Zhǎnshuò, born 14 May 2007) is a Chinese swimmer. He became the fastest swimmer aged 16 or under in history in the 400 m individual medley at the 2023 World Aquatics Junior Championships. He won the gold medal in the 4 × 200 m freestyle relay at the 2024 World Aquatics Championships. In 2026, he swam the fastest 200 m freestyle relay split in history, recording 1:42.92 as the anchor leg of China's gold-medal-winning team at the 2026 Asian Games. He also set a record for the most swimming gold medals won by an athlete at a single edition of the Asian Games, winning seven.

== Career ==
=== 2023 season ===
In September 2023, at the age of 16, Zhang competed in the World Junior Championships. In the 800 m freestyle, he won bronze with a time of 7:50.03. In the 400 m individual medley, he won silver with a time of 4:12.44, becoming the fastest age 16 and under swimmer in history in the 400-meter individual medley. In the 1500 m freestyle, he won bronze with a time of 15:11.94.

=== 2024 season ===
In February 2024, Zhang competed in the World Aquatics Championships. In the 4 × 200 m freestyle relay, he anchored in 1:45.80 to help China win the gold medal.

=== 2025 season ===
In July 2025, Zhang competed in the World Aquatics Championships. In the 4 × 200 m freestyle relay, he anchored in 1:44.20 to help China claim the silver medal. Their clocking of 7:00.91 also marked a new Asian Record.

In September, Zhang participated in the Chinese National Championships. In the 400 m freestyle, he ripped a new lifetime best of 3:42.99 to win gold, establishing a new World Junior Record.

In November, at the National Games of China, Zhang swept the individual freestyle races spanning the 200 m, 400 m, 800 m, 1500 m. In the 400 m freestyle, he fired off a new World Junior Record of 3:42.82 en route to gold. In the 200 m freestyle, he ripped a new lifetime best of 1:44.86. In the 800 m freestyle, he touched in a time of 7:46.69. In the 1500 m freestyle, he touched in 14:52.73.

=== 2026 season ===
In March 2026, at the China Open Swimming Championships, Zhang again swept the individual freestyle races. In the 200 m freestyle, he crushed a new lifetime best of 1:44.53. In the 1500 m freestyle, he put up a new personal best of 14:51.93. In the 400 m freestyle, he busted out a career-swiftest performance of 3:41.55. In the 800 m freestyle, he notched a fourth personal best time of 7:44.45.

In September, Zhang competed in the Asian Games. In the 4 × 200 m freestyle relay, he anchored China's gold-medal-winning team, swimming a split of 1:42.92, the fastest 200-metre freestyle relay split with a flying start in history, to help China overcome a 1.89-second deficit to Japan and finish with a time of 7:00.17, breaking the Asian record. In the 1500 m freestyle, he touched in 14:42.42 for a new lifetime best. In the 200 m freestyle, he scorched a lifetime best of 1:43.49, breaking Hwang Sun-woo’s Asian record of 1:43.92. In the 800 m freestyle, he clocked 7:42.49 for a new Asian Games record, overtaking the 7:46.03 Kim Woo-min notched in 2023. Just minutes after his 800 m freestyle victory, Zhang headed to the 4 × 100 m freestyle relay, splitting 47.65 on the third leg to help China win the gold and set a new Asian record. On the final day of swimming, Zhang took the 400 m freestyle with a time of 3:41.28, overtaking the Asian Games record of 3:41.53 Park Tae-hwan set in 2010 and completing his sweep of seven gold medals. He became the first swimmer in history to win seven golds at a single Asian Games. After his final race, he said, "Today feels like a perfect conclusion".

== Personal best times ==
=== Long course metres (50 m pool) ===
Event	Time	Meet	Location	Date	Notes	Ref
100 m freestyle	48.23	2026 Asian Games	Tokyo, Japan	20 September 2026		
200 m freestyle	1:43.49	2026 Asian Games	Tokyo, Japan	23 September 2026	AS, NR	
400 m freestyle	3:41.28	2026 Asian Games	Tokyo, Japan	25 September 2026		
800 m freestyle	7:42.49	2026 Asian Games	Tokyo, Japan	24 September 2026		
1500 m freestyle	14:42.42	2026 Asian Games	Tokyo, Japan	22 September 2026		
200 m individual medley	01:58.59	2025 China Spring National Championships	Qingdao, Shandong, China	21 March 2025		
400 m individual medley	04:11.86	2025 Chinese National Championships	Shenzhen, Guangdong, China	24 May 2025		

Legend: WR – World record; AS – Asian record; NR – Chinese record; e – equalled existing record; WJR – World junior record;
Records not set in finals: h – heat; sf – semifinal; r – relay 1st leg; rh – relay heat 1st leg; b – B final; † – en route to final mark; so – swim-off; tt – time trial

== Records ==
=== Long course metres (50 m pool) ===
No.	Event	Time	Meet	Location	Date	Age	Type	Status	Ref
1	400 m freestyle	3:42.82	2025 National Games of China	Shenzhen, China	10 November 2025	18	WJR	Current	
2	200 m freestyle	1:43.49	2026 Asian Games	Tokyo, Japan	23 September 2026	19	AS, NR	Current	

Legend: WR – World record; AS – Asian record; NR – Chinese record; e – equalled existing record; WJR – World junior record;
Records not set in finals: h – heat; sf – semifinal; r – relay 1st leg; rh – relay heat 1st leg; b – B final; † – en route to final mark; so – swim-off; tt – time trial
