= Kazusa Kuroda =

Japanese swimmer (born 2007)

Personal information
- Native name: 黒田 一瑳
- Nationality: Japanese
- Born: 21 June 2007 (age 19)
- Education: Meiji University

Sport
- Sport: Swimming
- Strokes: Freestyle
- Club: Konami Sports
Medal record
Men's swimming
Representing Japan
Asian Games
Silver medal – second place	2026 Aichi–Nagoya	4×200 m freestyle
Bronze medal – third place	2026 Aichi–Nagoya	4×100 m freestyle
World Junior Championships
Gold medal – first place	2025 Otopeni	4×100 m medley
Silver medal – second place	2025 Otopeni	4×200 m freestyle

Kazusa Kuroda (Japanese: 黒田 一瑳, born 21 June 2007) is a Japanese competitive swimmer who specialises in freestyle events. He represents Meiji University and Konami Sports. He won silver in the men's 4 × 200-metre freestyle relay and bronze in the men's 4 × 100-metre freestyle relay at the 2026 Asian Games. He has also won gold and silver medals at the World Aquatics Junior Swimming Championships.

== Career ==
Kuroda competed for Japan at the 2024 Junior Pan Pacific Swimming Championships in Canberra, Australia. He finished third in the mixed 4 × 100-metre medley relay, earning his first international medal at the competition. He also competed in the men's 100-metre and 200-metre freestyle events, finishing sixth and fifth, respectively, and placed fourth in several relay events.

In August 2025, Kuroda represented Japan at the 2025 World Aquatics Junior Swimming Championships in Otopeni, Romania. He won gold as a member of the men's 4 × 100-metre medley relay team and silver in the men's 4 × 200-metre freestyle relay. In the individual men's 200-metre freestyle, he finished fifth. He also competed in the men's 4 × 100-metre freestyle relay and the mixed 4 × 100-metre freestyle relay.

In October 2025, Kuroda won the men's 200-metre freestyle at the Japanese Short Course Swimming Championships, finishing in 1 minute 43.42 seconds. He also placed fourth in the men's 100-metre freestyle.

At the Japanese Swimming Championships in March 2026, Kuroda finished third in the men's 200-metre freestyle with a time of 1:47.22.

Kuroda competed in the men's 4 × 200-metre freestyle relay at the 2026 Pan Pacific Swimming Championships in Irvine, California. Swimming the third leg, he helped Japan finish third and win the bronze medal. The team recorded a time of 7:02.74.

At the 2026 Asian Games in Aichi–Nagoya, Japan, Kuroda finished fifth in the men's 200-metre freestyle. He also competed in two relay events. In the men's 4 × 200-metre freestyle relay final on 21 September, he swam the third leg as Japan finished second in 7:01.05, setting a Japanese national record that surpassed the previous mark, which had stood for 17 years. The result earned him a silver medal. He also won bronze in the men's 4 × 100-metre freestyle relay.
