= Kazushi Imafuku =

Japanese swimmer (born 2007)

Personal information
- Full name: Kazushi Imafuku
- Nationality: Japan
- Born: 21 May 2007 (age 19)

Sport
- Sport: Swimming
- Strokes: Freestyle
Medal record
Men's swimming
Representing Japan
Asian Games
Silver medal – second place	2026 Aichi–Nagoya	400 m freestyle
Silver medal – second place	2026 Aichi–Nagoya	4×200 m freestyle
Bronze medal – third place	2026 Aichi-Nagoya	1500 m freestyle
Bronze medal – third place	2026 Aichi–Nagoya	4×100 m freestyle
Pan Pacific Championships
Silver medal – second place	2026 Irvine	1500 m freestyle
World Junior Championships
Silver medal – second place	2025 Otopeni	800 m freestyle
Silver medal – second place	2025 Otopeni	1500 m freestyle
Silver medal – second place	2025 Otopeni	4x200 m freestyle
Junior Pan Pacific Championships
Gold medal – first place	2024 Canberra	1500 m freestyle
Silver medal – second place	2024 Canberra	800 m freestyle

Kazushi Imafuku (born 21 May 2007) is a Japanese swimmer specializing in distance freestyle. At 17 years old, Imafuku broke the Japanese national record in the 1500 metres freestyle with a time of 14:50.18. The next year, he broke the 800 metres freestyle record at Japan's high school nationals. Despite a stomach illness, he won three silver medals at the 2025 World Aquatics Junior Swimming Championships.

At the 2026 Pan Pacific Swimming Championships, Imafuku won silver in the 1500 m freestyle, reclaiming the Japanese record which had been taken by Kaito Tabuchi, lowering it to 14:42.59.
