= Aya Sato =

Japanese swimmer (born 1994)

Personal information
- Nationality: Japanese
- Born: 2 July 1994 (age 31)

Sport
- Sport: Swimming
Medal record
Representing Japan
Summer Universiade
Silver medal – second place	2015 Gwangju	4x100m freestyle relay

Aya Sato (佐藤 綾, Satō Aya; born 2 July 1994) is a Japanese swimmer. She competed in the women's 50 metre freestyle event at the 2018 FINA World Swimming Championships (25 m), in Hangzhou, China.
