= Lee Ho-joon (swimmer) =

South Korean swimmer (born 2001)

Personal information
- Nationality: South Korean
- Born: February 14, 2001 (age 25) Seoul, South Korea

Sport
- Country: South Korea
- Sport: Swimming
- Events: Freestyle; Freestyle relay
Medal record
World Championships (LC)
Silver medal – second place	2024 Doha	4×200 m freestyle
Asian Games
Gold medal – first place	2022 Hangzhou	4×200 m freestyle
Silver medal – second place	2022 Hangzhou	4×100 m freestyle
Silver medal – second place	2022 Hangzhou	4×100 m medley
Silver medal – second place	2026 Aichi–Nagoya	4×100 m freestyle
Bronze medal – third place	2022 Hangzhou	200 m freestyle
Bronze medal – third place	2026 Aichi–Nagoya	4×200 m freestyle
Asian Championships
Bronze medal – third place	2016 Tokyo	4×100 m freestyle

Korean name
- Hangul: 이호준
- RR: I Hojun
- MR: I Hojun

Lee Ho-joon (Korean: 이호준; born February 14, 2001) is a South Korean swimmer.

== Career ==
In July 2021, he represented South Korea at the 2020 Summer Olympics held in Tokyo, Japan. He competed in the 400m freestyle and 4 × 200m freestyle relay events. In the freestyle event, he did not advance to compete in the semifinal. In the freestyle relay event, the team did not advance to compete in the final.
