= List of Asian Games records in swimming =

The fastest times in the swimming events at the Asian Games are designated as the Asian Games records in swimming. The events are held in a long-course (50 m) pool. The most recent edition was held in Tokyo, Japan, in 2026.

All records were set in finals, unless noted otherwise.

== Men ==
Event	Time		Name	Nationality	Date	Meet	Location	Ref
50 m freestyle	21.66		Kim Young-beom	South Korea	21 September 2026	2026 Asian Games	Tokyo, Japan	
100 m freestyle	46.97		Pan Zhanle	China	24 September 2023	2022 Asian Games	Hangzhou, China	
200 m freestyle	1:43.49	AS	Zhang Zhanshuo	China	23 September 2026	2026 Asian Games	Tokyo, Japan	
400 m freestyle	3:41.28		Zhang Zhanshuo	China	25 September 2026	2026 Asian Games	Tokyo, Japan	
800 m freestyle	7:42.49		Zhang Zhanshuo	China	24 September 2026	2026 Asian Games	Tokyo, Japan	
1500 m freestyle	14:35.43		Sun Yang	China	18 November 2010	2010 Asian Games	Guangzhou, China	
50 m backstroke	24.04		Xu Jiayu	China	21 September 2026	2026 Asian Games	Tokyo, Japan	
100 m backstroke	51.98		Xu Jiayu	China	20 September 2026	2026 Asian Games	Tokyo, Japan	
200 m backstroke	1:53.26		Ryosuke Irie	Japan	25 September 2014	2014 Asian Games	Incheon, South Korea	
50m breaststroke	26.25	h	Qin Haiyang	China	29 September 2023	2022 Asian Games	Hangzhou, China	
100m breaststroke	57.76		Qin Haiyang	China	25 September 2023	2022 Asian Games	Hangzhou, China	
200m breaststroke	2:04.83	WR	Shin Ohashi	Japan	24 September 2026	2026 Asian Games	Tokyo, Japan	
50m butterfly	22.91	=AS	Mikhail Arkhangelskiy	Bahrain	24 September 2026	2026 Asian Games	Tokyo, Japan	
100m butterfly	50.56		Shoon Mitsunaga	Japan	23 September 2026	2026 Asian Games	Tokyo, Japan	
200m butterfly	1:53.15		Tomoru Honda	Japan	29 September 2023	2022 Asian Games	Hangzhou, China	
200m individual medley	1:54.62	AS	Wang Shun	China	24 September 2023	2022 Asian Games	Hangzhou, China	
400m individual medley	4:07.02		Yumeki Kojima	Japan	22 September 2026	2026 Asian Games	Tokyo, Japan	
4×100m freestyle relay	3:10.60	AS	Zhao Jiayue (48.43); Wang Haoyu (47.77); Zhang Zhanshuo (47.65); Pan Zhanle (46.75)	China	24 September 2026	2026 Asian Games	Tokyo, Japan	
4×200m freestyle relay	7:00.17	AS	Xu Haibo (1:46.27); Fei Liwei (1:46.74); Pan Zhanle (1:44.24); Zhang Zhanshuo (1:42.92)	China	21 September 2026	2026 Asian Games	Tokyo, Japan	
4×100m medley relay	3:27.01	AS	Xu Jiayu (52.05); Qin Haiyang (57.63); Wang Changhao (50.68); Pan Zhanle (46.65)	China	26 September 2023	2022 Asian Games	Hangzhou, China	

Legend: WR – World record; AS – Asian record; e – equalled existing record;
Records not set in finals: h – heat; r – relay 1st leg; rh – relay heat 1st leg; † – en route to final mark; so – swim-off

== Women ==
Event	Time		Name	Nationality	Date	Meet	Location	Ref
50m freestyle	23.98		Wu Qingfeng	China	24 September 2026	2026 Asian Games	Tokyo, Japan	
100m freestyle	52.17		Siobhan Haughey	Hong Kong	26 September 2023	2022 Asian Games	Hangzhou, China	
200m freestyle	1:54.12		Siobhan Haughey	Hong Kong	25 September 2023	2022 Asian Games	Hangzhou, China	
400m freestyle	4:01.96		Li Bingjie	China	26 September 2023	2022 Asian Games	Hangzhou, China	
800m freestyle	8:18.55		Wang Jianjiahe	China	23 August 2018	2018 Asian Games	Jakarta, Indonesia	
1500m freestyle	15:51.18		Li Bingjie	China	24 September 2023	2022 Asian Games	Hangzhou, China	
50m backstroke	26.98	AS	Liu Xiang	China	21 August 2018	2018 Asian Games	Jakarta, Indonesia	
100m backstroke	58.94	r	Zhao Jing	China	13 November 2010	2010 Asian Games	Guangzhou, China	
200m backstroke	2:05.77	AS	Peng Xuwei	China	22 September 2026	2026 Asian Games	Tokyo, Japan	
50m breaststroke	29.45		Tang Qianting	China	20 September 2026	2026 Asian Games	Tokyo, Japan	
100m breaststroke	1:04.98		Tang Qianting	China	23 September 2026	2026 Asian Games	Tokyo, Japan	
200m breaststroke	2:21.82		Kanako Watanabe	Japan	22 September 2014	2014 Asian Games	Incheon, South Korea	
50m butterfly	25.10		Zhang Yufei	China	29 September 2023	2022 Asian Games	Hangzhou, China	
100m butterfly	55.86		Zhang Yufei	China	27 September 2023	2022 Asian Games	Hangzhou, China	
200m butterfly	2:05.08		Yu Zidi	China	20 September 2026	2026 Asian Games	Tokyo, Japan	
200m individual medley	2:06.10	AS	Yu Zidi	China	21 September 2026	2026 Asian Games	Tokyo, Japan	
400m individual medley	4:28.56		Yu Zidi	China	23 September 2026	2026 Asian Games	Tokyo, Japan	
4×100m freestyle relay	3:33.10		Yu Yiting (53.39); Zhang Yufei (52.99); Cheng Yujie (53.79); Wu Qingfeng (52.93)	China	20 September 2026	2026 Asian Games	Tokyo, Japan	
4×200m freestyle relay	7:48.61		Li Bingjie (1:56.94); Wang Jianjiahe (1:55.35); Zhang Yuhan (1:58.37); Yang Junxuan (1:57.95)	China	21 August 2018	2018 Asian Games	Jakarta, Indonesia	
4×100m medley relay	3:54.55		Peng Xuwei (59.20); Tang Qianting (1:05.74); Zhang Yufei (56.30); Yu Yiting (53.31)	China	25 September 2026	2026 Asian Games	Tokyo, Japan	

Legend: WR – World record; AS – Asian record; e – equalled existing record;
Records not set in finals: h – heat; r – relay 1st leg; rh – relay heat 1st leg; so – swim-off

== Mixed relay ==
Event	Time	Name	Nationality	Date	Meet	Location	Ref
4×100 m medley relay	3:37.73	Xu Jiayu (51.91); Qin Haiyang (57.25); Zhang Yufei (56.05); Yang Junxuan (52.52)	China	27 September 2023	2022 Asian Games	Hangzhou, China	

Legend: WR – World record; AS – Asian record; e – equalled existing record;
Records not set in finals: h – heat; so – swim-off
