= Kim Woo-min =

South Korean swimmer (born 2001)

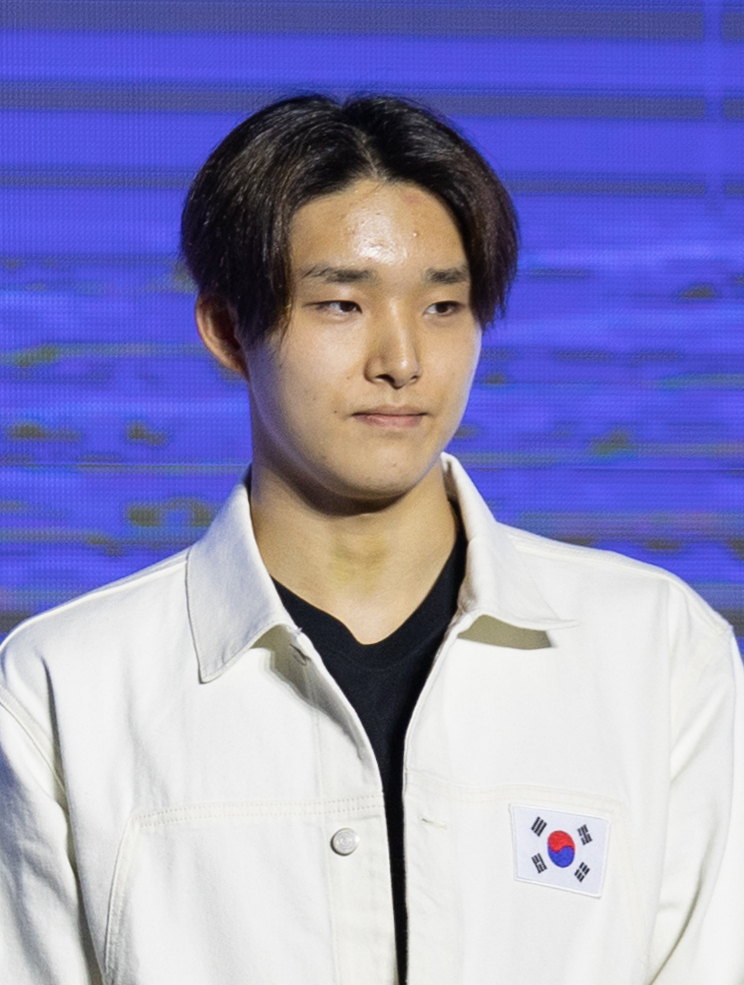
- Kim in 2023

Personal information
- Nationality: South Korean
- Born: August 24, 2001 (age 25) Busan, South Korea
- Height: 1.82 m (6 ft 0 in)

Sport
- Country: South Korea
- Sport: Swimming
- Event: Freestyle relay
Medal record
Representing South Korea
Olympic Games
Bronze medal – third place	2024 Paris	400 m freestyle
World Championships
Gold medal – first place	2024 Doha	400 m freestyle
Silver medal – second place	2024 Doha	4×200 m freestyle
Bronze medal – third place	2025 Singapore	400 m freestyle
Asian Games
Gold medal – first place	2022 Hangzhou	4 x 200 m freestyle
Gold medal – first place	2022 Hangzhou	400 m freestyle
Gold medal – first place	2022 Hangzhou	800 m freestyle
Silver medal – second place	2022 Hangzhou	1500 m freestyle
Silver medal – second place	2026 Aichi–Nagoya	4×100 m freestyle
Bronze medal – third place	2026 Aichi–Nagoya	4×200 m freestyle

Korean name
- Hangul: 김우민
- RR: Gim Umin
- MR: Kim Umin

Kim Woo-min (Korean: 김우민; born August 24, 2001) is a South Korean swimmer. He is the 2024 Summer Olympics bronze medalist in the Men's 400m Freestyle.

== Career ==
In July 2021, he represented South Korea at the 2020 Summer Olympics held in Tokyo, Japan. He competed in 4 × 200m freestyle relay event. The team did not advance to compete in the final.

Kim made a mark in 2024 when he won the 400m freestyle with a time of 3:42.71 to become the second Korean to win the event after Park Tae-hwan won it twice in 2007 and 2011.

== Results ==
All results
Event	Time	Meet	Date	Notes
Men's 1500m Freestyle	15:58.20	Korean National Trials 2017	May 12, 2017	
Men's 1500m Freestyle	15:50.04	98th Korean National Sports Festival	October 21, 2017	
Men's 400m Freestyle	4:08.86	98th Korean National Sports Festival	October 24, 2017	
Men's 800m Freestyle	8:09.96	Korean National Trials	April 27, 2018	
Men's 1500m Freestyle	15:32.61	Korean National Trials	April 27, 2018	
Men's 800m Freestyle	8:11.56	MBC Cup Swimming Competition 2018	July 19, 2018	
Men's 400m Freestyle	3:56.66	MBC Cup Swimming Competition 2018	July 19, 2018	
Men's 1500m Freestyle	15:34.35	99th Korean National Sports Festival	October 13, 2018	
Men's 400m Freestyle	3:55.76	99th Korean National Sports Festival	October 16, 2018	
Men's 1500m Freestyle	15:39.18	Korean National Trials #1 2019	March 1, 2019	
Men's 800m Freestyle	8:06.73	Korean National Trials #1 2019	March 1, 2019	
Men's 800m Freestyle	8:01.21	Korean National Trials #2 2019	May 18, 2019	
Men's 1500m Freestyle	15:29.58	Korean National Trials #2 2019	May 18, 2019	
Men's 800m Freestyle	8:14.44	18th FINA World Championships 2019	July 23, 2019	Heats
Men's 1500m Freestyle	15:26.17	18th FINA World Championships 2019	July 27, 2019	Heats
Men's 1500m Freestyle	15:27.54	100th Korean National Sports Festival	October 5, 2019	
Men's 4 × 200 m Freestyle Relay	7:44.19	100th Korean National Sports Festival	October 6, 2019	
Men's 400m Freestyle	3:52.76	100th Korean National Sports Festival	October 8, 2019	
Men's 4 × 100 m Freestyle Relay	3:33.08	100th Korean National Sports Festival	October 8, 2019	
Men's 400m Freestyle	3:59.67	FINA Swimming World Cup 2019 (Russia)	November 1, 2019	Heats
Men's 1500m Freestyle	15:30.93	FINA Swimming World Cup 2019 (Russia)	November 2, 2019	
Men's 800m Freestyle	8:01.06	Korean National Trials 2020	November 18, 2020	
Men's 1500m Freestyle	15:30.95	Korean National Trials 2020	November 20, 2020	
Men's 1500m Freestyle	15:14.26	Korean National Trials 2021	May 13, 2021	
Men's 800m Freestyle	7:59.70	Korean National Trials 2021	May 15, 2021	
Men's 200m Freestyle	1:49.62	Korean National Trials 2021	May 15, 2021	
Men's 4 × 200 m Freestyle Relay	7:11.45	Korean National Trials 2021	May 17, 2021	
Men's 4 × 200 m Freestyle Relay	7;15.03	2020 Tokyo Olympics	July 27, 2021	
Men's 200m Backstroke	1:55.81	FINA Swimming World Cup 2021 (Qatar)	October 21, 2021	
Men's 100m Individual Medley	55.01	FINA Swimming World Cup 2021 (Qatar)	October 21, 2021	
Men's 1500m Freestyle	14:44.58	FINA Swimming World Cup 2021 (Qatar)	October 22, 2021	
Men's 400m Medley	4:15.99	FINA Swimming World Cup 2021 (Qatar)	October 23, 2021	PB
Men's 4 × 100 m Freestyle Relay	3:16.48	15th FINA World Swimming Championships (25m) 2021	December 16, 2021	Heats, NR
Men's 4x50m Freestyle Relay	1:28.56	15th FINA World Swimming Championships (25m) 2021	December 19, 2021	Heats, NR
Men's 1500m Freestyle	15:06.13	15th FINA World Swimming Championships (25m) 2021	December 20, 2021	Heats
Men's 1500m Freestyle	15:11.42	Korean National Trials 2022	March 24, 2022	
Men's 400m Freestyle	3:48.26	Korean National Trials 2022	March 24, 2022	
Men's 800m Freestyle	7:57.60	Korean National Trials 2022	March 26, 2022	
Men's 200m Freestyle	1:47.69	Korean National Trials 2022	March 26, 2022	
Men's 400m Freestyle	3:45.64	19th FINA World Championships Budapest 2022	June 18, 2022	
Men's 800m Freestyle	7:53.27	19th FINA World Championships Budapest 2022	June 20, 2022	Heats
Men's 4 × 200 m Freestyle Relay	7:06.23	19th FINA World Championships Budapest 2022	June 23, 2022	
Men's 1500m Freestyle	15:08.50	19th FINA World Championships Budapest 2022	June 24, 2022	Heats
Men's 1500m Freestyle	14:54.25	103rd Korean National Sports Festival	October 8, 2022	
Men's 4 × 200 m Freestyle Relay	7:15.00	103rd Korean National Sports Festival	October 9, 2022	
Men's 400m Freestyle	3:45.65	103rd Korean National Sports Festival	October 11, 2022	
Men's 4 × 100 m Freestyle Relay	3:15.39	103rd Korean National Sports Festival	October 11, 2022	
Men's 1500m Freestyle	14:45.35	16th FINA World Swimming Championships (25m) 2022	December 13, 2022	
Men's 400m Freestyle	3:38.86	16th FINA World Swimming Championships (25m) 2022	December 15, 2022	Heats
Men's 4 × 200 m Freestyle Relay	6:49.67	16th FINA World Swimming Championships (25m) 2022	December 16, 2022	PB
Men's 800m Freestyle	7:45.29	16th FINA World Swimming Championships (25m) 2022	December 17, 2022	
Men's 1500m Freestyle	15:02.96	Korean National Trials 2023	March 25, 2023	
Men's 800m Freestyle	7:52.62	Korean National Trials 2023	March 27, 2023	
Men's 200m Freestyle	1:46.10	Korean National Trials 2023	March 28, 2023	
Men's 400m Freestyle	3:45.59	Korean National Trials 2023	March 29, 2023	
Men's 400m Freestyle	3:43.92	World Aquatics Championships - Fukuoka 2023	July 23, 2023	
Men's 800m Freestyle	7:47.69	World Aquatics Championships - Fukuoka 2023	July 25, 2023	Heats
Men's 4 × 200 m Freestyle Relay	7:04.07	World Aquatics Championships - Fukuoka 2023	July 28, 2023	
Men's 4 × 200 m Freestyle Relay	7:01.73	19th Asian Games 2023	September 25, 2023	GR, AS
Men's 1500m Freestyle	15:01.07	19th Asian Games 2023	September 26, 2023	
Men's 800m Freestyle	7:46.03	19th Asian Games 2023	September 28, 2023	
Men's 400m Freestyle	3:44.36	19th Asian Games 2023	September 29, 2023	
Men's 1500m Freestyle	15:15.75	104th Korean National Sports Festival	October 14, 2023	
Men's 4 × 200 m Freestyle Relay	7:18.42	104th Korean National Sports Festival	October 15, 2023	
Men's 400m Freestyle	3:46.07	104th Korean National Sports Festival	October 17, 2023	
Men's 4 × 100 m Freestyle Relay	3:15.94	104th Korean National Sports Festival	October 17, 2023	
Men's 800m Freestyle	7:52.84	2024 Korean Trials	November 25, 2023	
Men's 200m Freestyle	1:46.06	2024 Korean Trials	November 27, 2023	
Men's 400m Freestyle	3:45.26	2024 Korean Trials	November 27, 2023	
Men's 400m Freestyle	3:42.71	World Aquatics Championships - Doha 2024	February 11, 2024	
Men's 4 × 200 m Freestyle Relay	7:01.94	World Aquatics Championships - Doha 2024	February 16, 2024	
Men's 1500m Freestyle	14:58.03	KB Korean Swimming Championships 2024	March 22, 2024	
Men's 100m Freestyle	49.40	KB Korean Swimming Championships 2024	March 23, 2024	
Men's 200m Freestyle	1:45.68	KB Korean Swimming Championships 2024	March 25, 2024	
Men's 400m Freestyle	3:43.69	KB Korean Swimming Championships 2024	March 26, 2024	
Men's 400m Freestyle	3:45.12	2024 Australia Championships	April 17, 2024	
Men's 200m Freestyle	1:46.83	2024 Australia Championships	April 18, 2024	
Men's 800m Freestyle	7:49.69	2024 Australia Championships	April 19, 2024	
Men's 100m Freestyle	49.86	2024 Australia Championships	April 20, 2024	Heats
Men's 400m Freestyle	3:44.81	Mare Nostrum Swim Tour 2024 (Barcelona)	May 30, 2024	
Men's 400m Freestyle	3:42.42	Mare Nostrum Swim Tour 2024 (Monaco)	June 1, 2024	
Men's 400m Freestyle	3:42.50	2024 Paris Olympics	July 27, 2024	finals
Men's 200m Freestyle	1:46.58	2024 Paris Olympics	July 28, 2024	semi-finals
Men's 4 × 200 m Freestyle Relay	7:07.26	2024 Paris Olympics	July 30, 2024	heats

Key: AS = Asian Record; NR = National Record; GR= Asian Games Record
