= Glen Lim =

Singaporean swimmer (born 2002)

Glen Lim Jun Wei
Personal information
- Nationality: Singaporean
- Born: 28 March 2002 (age 24)

Sport
- Sport: Swimming
Medal record
Men's swimming
Representing Singapore
Asian Games
Bronze medal – third place	2018 Jakarta-Palembang	4×200 m freestyle
Southeast Asian Games
Silver medal – second place	2023 Cambodia	4x200 m freestyle
Bronze medal – third place	2021 Vietnam	400 m freestyle
Bronze medal – third place	2021 Vietnam	4x200 m freestyle
Bronze medal – third place	2023 Cambodia	400 m freestyle
Bronze medal – third place	2023 Cambodia	1500 m freestyle
Bronze medal – third place	2025 Thailand	4x200 m freestyle

Glen Lim Jun Wei (born 28 March 2002) is a Singaporean swimmer. He competed in the men's 400 metre freestyle at the 2019 World Aquatics Championships. He won the 400m freestyle at the Neo Garden 14th Singapore National Swimming Championships in 2019, breaking the national record of 3min 54.64sec and set a national record of 3min 54.12sec.
