= Tatsuya Murasa =

Japanese swimmer

Personal information
- Born: 27 March 2007 (age 19) Kariya, Japan
- Height: 178 cm (5 ft 10 in)

Sport
- Sport: Swimming
- Strokes: Freestyle
Medal record
Men's swimming
Representing Japan
World Championships (LC)
| Bronze medal – third place | 2025 Singapore | 200 m freestyle |
Asian Games
| Silver medal – second place | 2026 Aichi–Nagoya | 4×100 m medley |
| Silver medal – second place | 2026 Aichi–Nagoya | 4×200 m freestyle |
| Bronze medal – third place | 2026 Aichi–Nagoya | 200 m freestyle |
| Bronze medal – third place | 2026 Aichi–Nagoya | 4×100 m freestyle |
Pan Pacific Championships
| Bronze medal – third place | 2026 Irvine | 4×100 m freestyle |
| Bronze medal – third place | 2026 Irvine | 4×200 m freestyle |
| Bronze medal – third place | 2026 Irvine | 4×100 m medley |

Tatsuya Murasa (村佐達也, Murasa Tatsuya; born 27 March 2007) is a Japanese competitive swimmer. He competed in the men's 4 × 200 metre freestyle relay at the 2024 Summer Olympics and won a bronze medal at the men's 200 metre freestyle at the 2025 World Aquatics Championships.

== Career ==
Murasa Graduated from the Kariya Municipal Fujimatsukita Elementary School, Kariya Municipal Fujimatsu Junior High School, and Chukyo University's Chukyo High School, and is currently studying at Chuo University's Faculty of Policy Studies. At the 2025 World Aquatics Championships, he set a new Japanese record of 1 minute and 44.54 seconds in the 200m freestyle race and won a bronze medal.
