= Fei Liwei =

Chinese swimmer (born 2003)

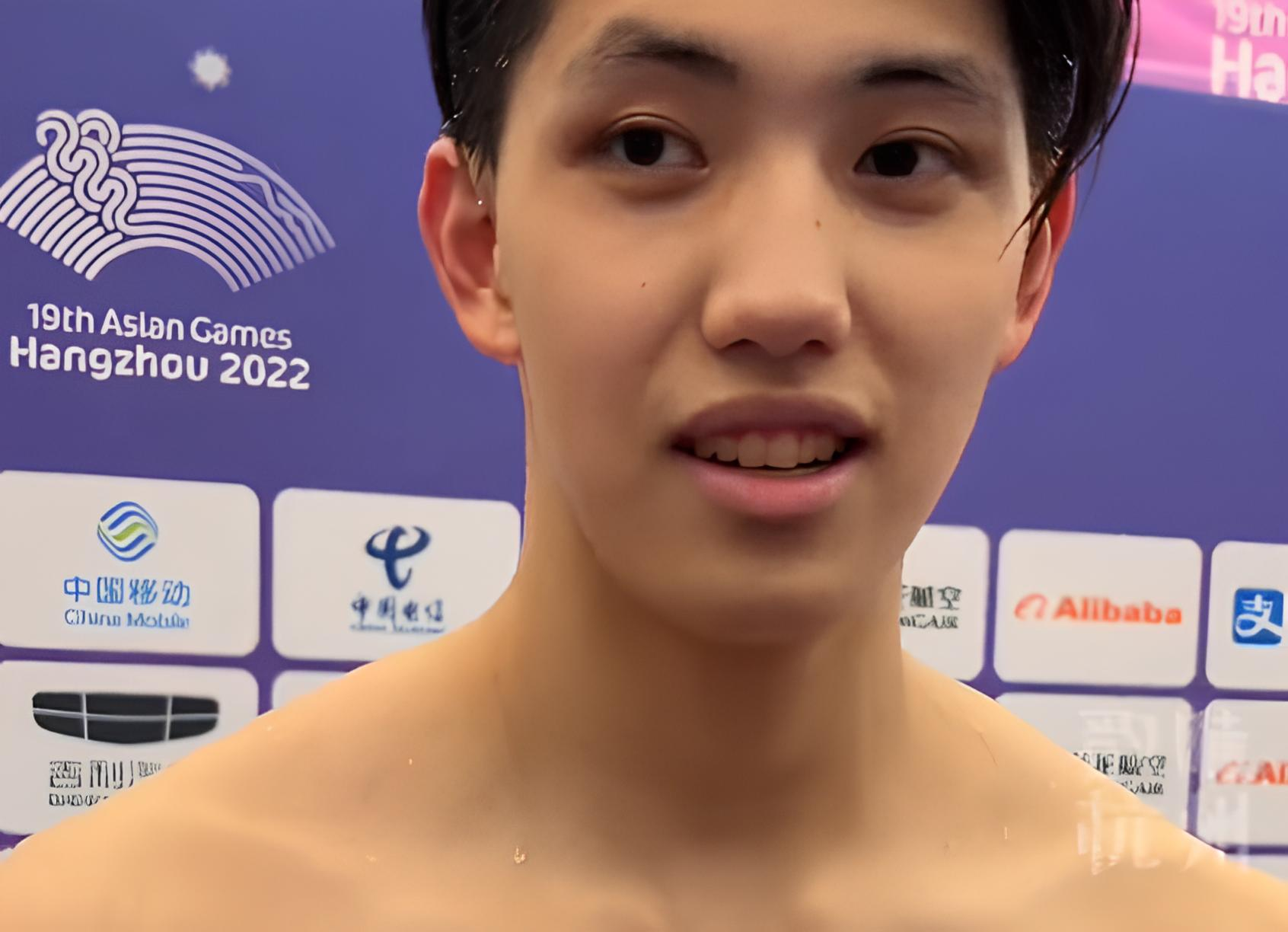

Personal information
- Nationality: Chinese
- Born: 12 March 2003 (age 23) Hangzhou, China

Sport
- Sport: Swimming
Medal record
Men's swimming
Representing China
World Championships (LC)
Silver medal – second place	2025 Singapore	4×200 m freestyle
Asian Games
Gold medal – first place	2022 Hangzhou	1500 m freestyle
Gold medal – first place	2026 Aichi–Nagoya	4×200 m freestyle
Silver medal – second place	2022 Hangzhou	800 m freestyle
Silver medal – second place	2022 Hangzhou	4×200 m freestyle
Bronze medal – third place	2026 Aichi–Nagoya	400 m freestyle

Fei Liwei (Chinese: 费立纬; born 12 March 2003) is a Chinese competitive swimmer. He represented China at the 2024 Summer Olympics.
