= List of Asian records in swimming =

Asia

The Asian records are the fastest times ever swum by a swimmer representing a member federation of Asia Aquatics, Asia's governing affiliate of World Aquatics.

Records can be set in long course (50 metres) or short course (25 metres) swimming pools, with records currently recorded in the following events for both men and women.

- Freestyle: 50 m, 100 m, 200 m, 400 m, 800 m, 1500 m
- Backstroke: 50 m, 100 m, 200 m
- Breaststroke: 50 m, 100 m, 200 m
- Butterfly: 50 m, 100 m, 200 m
- Individual medley: 100 m (short course only), 200 m, 400 m
- Relays: 4×50 m freestyle (short course only), 4 × 100 m freestyle, 4 × 200 m freestyle, 4×50 m medley (short course only), 4 × 100 m medley

All records were set in finals unless noted otherwise.

== Long course (50 m) ==
=== Men ===
Event	Time		Name	Nationality	Date	Meet	Location	Ref
50 m freestyle	21.64		Shuya Matsumoto	Japan	27 July 2025	Shizuoka Championships	Fuji, Japan	
100 m freestyle	46.40	WR	Pan Zhanle	China	31 July 2024	Olympic Games	Paris, France	
200 m freestyle	1:43.92		Hwang Sun-woo	South Korea	20 October 2025	Korean National Sports Festival	Busan, South Korea	
200 m freestyle	1:43.49	#	Zhang Zhanshuo	China	23 September 2026	Asian Games	Tokyo, Japan	
400 m freestyle	3:40.14		Sun Yang	China	28 July 2012	Olympic Games	London, United Kingdom	
800 m freestyle	7:32.12	WR	Zhang Lin	China	29 July 2009	World Championships	Rome, Italy	
1500 m freestyle	14:31.02		Sun Yang	China	4 August 2012	Olympic Games	London, United Kingdom	
50 m backstroke	23.92		Xu Jiayu	China	17 June 2026	Chinese Championships	Hangzhou, China	
100 m backstroke	51.86		Xu Jiayu	China	12 April 2017	Chinese Championships	Qingdao, China	
200 m backstroke	1:52.51		Ryosuke Irie	Japan	31 July 2009	World Championships	Rome, Italy	
50 m breaststroke	26.20	sf	Qin Haiyang	China	25 July 2023	World Championships	Fukuoka, Japan	
100 m breaststroke	57.69	=	Qin Haiyang	China	24 July 2023	World Championships	Fukuoka, Japan	
100 m breaststroke	57.69	=	Qin Haiyang	China	6 October 2023	World Cup	Berlin, Germany	
200 m breaststroke	2:04.83	WR	Shin Ohashi	Japan	24 September 2026	Asian Games	Tokyo, Japan	
50m butterfly	22.91	=	Mikhail Arkhangelskiy	Bahrain	27 June 2026	French Championships	Saint-Étienne, France	
50m butterfly	22.91	=, #	Mikhail Arkhangelskiy	Bahrain	24 September 2026	Asian Games	Tokyo, Japan	
100m butterfly	50.39		Joseph Schooling	Singapore	12 August 2016	Olympic Games	Rio de Janeiro, Brazil	
200m butterfly	1:52.53		Daiya Seto	Japan	18 January 2020	Champions Swim Series	Beijing, China	
200m individual medley	1:54.62		Wang Shun	China	24 September 2023	Asian Games	Hangzhou, China	
400m individual medley	4:05.83		Tomoyuki Matsushita	Japan	3 September 2026	Japanese Intercollege Championships	Osaka, Japan	
4 × 100 m freestyle relay	3:10.88		Pan Zhanle (47.06); Chen Juner (48.00); Hong Jinquan (48.27); Wang Haoyu (47.55)	China	28 September 2023	Asian Games	Hangzhou, China	
4 × 100 m freestyle relay	3:10.60	#	Zhao Jiayue (48.43); Wang Haoyu (47.77); Zhang Zhanshuo (47.65); Pan Zhanle (46.75)	China	24 September 2026	Asian Games	Tokyo, Japan	
4 × 200 m freestyle relay	7:00.91		Ji Xinjie (1:46.22); Pan Zhanle (1:44.41); Wang Shun (1:46.08); Zhang Zhanshuo (1:44.20)	China	1 August 2025	World Championships	Singapore, Singapore	
4 × 200 m freestyle relay	7:00.17	#	Xu Haibo (1:46.27); Fei Liwei (1:46.74); Pan Zhanle (1:44.24); Zhang Zhanshuo (1:42.92)	China	21 September 2026	Asian Games	Tokyo, Japan	
4 × 100 m medley relay	3:27.01		Xu Jiayu (52.05); Qin Haiyang (57.63); Wang Changhao (50.68); Pan Zhanle (46.65)	China	26 September 2023	Asian Games	Hangzhou, China	

Legend: # – Record awaiting ratification by Asia Aquatics; WR – World record; e – equalled existing record;
Records not set in finals: h – heat; sf – semifinal; r – relay 1st leg; rh – relay heat 1st leg; b – B final; † – en route to final mark; so – swim-off; tt – time trial

=== Women ===
Event	Time		Name	Nationality	Date	Meet	Location	Ref
50m freestyle	23.97		Liu Xiang	China	26 September 2021	Chinese National Games	Xi'an, China	
100m freestyle	52.02		Siobhan Haughey	Hong Kong	8 October 2023	World Cup	Berlin, Germany	
200m freestyle	1:53.92		Siobhan Haughey	Hong Kong	28 July 2021	Olympic Games	Tokyo, Japan	
400m freestyle	3:58.21		Li Bingjie	China	27 July 2025	World Championships	Singapore, Singapore	
800m freestyle	8:13.31		Li Bingjie	China	29 July 2023	World Championships	Fukuoka, Japan	
1500m freestyle	15:41.49	h	Wang Jianjiahe	China	26 July 2021	Olympic Games	Tokyo, Japan	
50m backstroke	26.98		Liu Xiang	China	21 August 2018	Asian Games	Jakarta, Indonesia	
100m backstroke	58.70	r	Aya Terakawa	Japan	4 August 2013	World Championships	Barcelona, Spain	
200m backstroke	2:06.46		Zhao Jing	China	14 November 2010	Asian Games	Guangzhou, China	
200m backstroke	2:05.77	#	Peng Xuwei	China	22 September 2026	Asian Games	Tokyo, Japan	
50m breaststroke	29.44		Tang Qianting	Shanghai	19 March 2026	China Open Championships	Shenzhen, China	
100m breaststroke	1:04.39		Tang Qianting	China	21 April 2024	Chinese Championships	Shenzhen, China	
200m breaststroke	2:19.65		Rie Kaneto	Japan	9 April 2016	Japanese Championships	Tokyo, Japan	
50m butterfly	25.05		Zhang Yufei	China	29 July 2023	World Championships	Fukuoka, Japan	
100m butterfly	55.62	h	Zhang Yufei	China	29 September 2020	Chinese Championships	Qingdao, China	
200m butterfly	2:01.81		Liu Zige	China	21 October 2009	Chinese National Games	Jinan, China	
200m individual medley	2:06.82		Yu Yiting	China	17 June 2026	Chinese Championships	Hangzhou, China	
200m individual medley	2:06.10	#	Yu Zidi	China	21 September 2026	Asian Games	Tokyo, Japan	
400m individual medley	4:28.43		Ye Shiwen	China	28 July 2012	Olympic Games	London, United Kingdom	
4 × 100 m freestyle relay	3:30.30		Yang Junxuan (52.48); Cheng Yujie (52.76); Zhang Yufei (52.75); Wu Qingfeng (52.31)	China	27 July 2024	Olympic Games	Paris, France	
4 × 200 m freestyle relay	7:40.33		Yang Junxuan (1:54.37); Tang Muhan (1:55.00); Zhang Yufei (1:55.66); Li Bingjie (1:55.30)	China	29 July 2021	Olympic Games	Tokyo, Japan	
4 × 100 m medley relay	3:52.19		Zhao Jing (58.98); Chen Huijia (1:04.12); Jiao Liuyang (56.28); Li Zhesi (52.81)	China	1 August 2009	World Championships	Rome, Italy	

Legend: # – Record awaiting ratification by Asia Aquatics; WR – World record; e – equalled existing record;
Records not set in finals: h – heat; sf – semifinal; r – relay 1st leg; rh – relay heat 1st leg; b – B final; † – en route to final mark; so – swim-off; tt – time trial

=== Mixed relay ===
Event	Time	Name	Club	Date	Meet	Location	Ref
4 × 100 m freestyle relay	3:21.18	Pan Zhanle (47.29); Wang Haoyu (47.41); Li Bingjie (53.11); Yu Yiting (53.37)	China	17 February 2024	World Championships	Doha, Qatar	
4 × 100 m medley relay	3:37.55	Xu Jiayu (52.13); Qin Haiyang (57.82); Zhang Yufei (55.64); Yang Junxuan (51.96)	China	3 August 2024	Olympic Games	Paris, France	

Legend: # – Record awaiting ratification by Asia Aquatics; WR – World record; e – equalled existing record;
Records not set in finals: h – heat; so – swim-off

== Short course (25 m) ==
=== Men ===
Event	Time		Name	Nationality	Date	Meet	Location	Ref
50m freestyle	20.80	=	Ji Yu-chan	South Korea	24 October 2024	World Cup	Incheon, South Korea	
50m freestyle	20.80	=	Ji Yu-chan	South Korea	14 December 2024	World Championships	Budapest, Hungary	
100m freestyle	45.77		Pan Zhanle	China	15 December 2022	World Championships	Melbourne, Australia	
200m freestyle	1:39.72		Hwang Sun-woo	South Korea	18 December 2022	World Championships	Melbourne, Australia	
400m freestyle	3:34.59		Park Tae-hwan	South Korea	6 December 2016	World Championships	Windsor, Canada	
800m freestyle	7:28.61	#	Zhang Zhanshuo	China	27 October 2026	Chinese Championships	Beijing, China	
1500 m freestyle	14:14.16		Kaito Tabuchi	Japan	10 October 2026	Japanese Championships	Saga, Japan	
50m backstroke	22.70		Xu Jiayu	China	3 November 2018	World Cup	Beijing, China	
50m backstroke	22.03	r, WR, #	Xu Jiayu	China	24 October 2026	Chinese Championships	Beijing, China	
100m backstroke	48.88		Xu Jiayu	China	11 November 2018	World Cup	Tokyo, Japan	
100m backstroke	48.54	r, #	Xu Jiayu	China	27 October 2026	Chinese Championships	Beijing, China	
200m backstroke	1:48.25		Masaki Kaneko	Japan	17 January 2016	Tokyo New Year Championships	Tokyo, Japan	
50m breaststroke	25.38		Qin Haiyang	China	19 October 2024	World Cup	Shanghai, China	
100m breaststroke	55.47		Qin Haiyang	China	12 December 2024	World Championships	Budapest, Hungary	
200m breaststroke	2:00.12		Shin Ohashi	Japan	12 October 2026	Japanese Championships	Saga, Japan	
50m butterfly	21.93		Teong Tzen Wei	Singapore	25 October 2025	World Cup	Toronto, Canada	
100m butterfly	48.58		Tomonobu Gomi	Japan	12 October 2026	Japanese Championships	Saga, Japan	
200m butterfly	1:46.85	WR	Tomoru Honda	Japan	22 October 2022	Japanese Championships	Tokyo, Japan	
100m individual medley	51.06		Kosuke Makino	Japan	10 October 2026	Japanese Championships	Saga, Japan	
200m individual medley	1:50.42		Tomoyuki Matsushita	Japan	12 October 2026	Japanese Championships	Saga, Japan	
400m individual medley	3:54.81	WR	Daiya Seto	Japan	20 December 2019	International Swimming League	Las Vegas, United States	
400m individual medley	3:54.33	WR, #	Tomoyuki Matsushita	Japan	11 October 2026	Japanese Championships	Saga, Japan	
4 × 50 m freestyle relay	1:23.80		Kosuke Matsui (21.26); Masahiro Kawane (20.79); Takeshi Kawamoto (20.79); Katsumi Nakamura (20.96)	Japan	15 December 2022	World Championships	Melbourne, Australia	
4 × 100 m freestyle relay	3:07.79		Katsumi Nakamura (47.05); Shinri Shioura (46.39); Reo Sakata (47.12); Kosuke Hagino (47.23)	Japan	3 December 2014	World Championships	Doha, Qatar	
4 × 200 m freestyle relay	6:47.53		Ji Xinjie (1:42.67); Xu Jiayu (1:41.68); Sun Yang (1:41.25); Wang Shun (1:41.93)	China	14 December 2018	World Championships	Hangzhou, China	
4 × 50 m medley relay	1:31.28		Takeshi Kawamoto (22.93); Yuya Hinomoto (25.64); Yuya Tanaka (22.13); Masahiro Kawane (20.58)	Japan	17 December 2022	World Championships	Melbourne, Australia	
4 × 100 m medley relay	3:21.07		Ryosuke Irie (49.95); Yasuhiro Koseki (55.91); Takeshi Kawamoto (49.58); Katsumi Nakamura (45.63)	Japan	16 December 2018	World Championships	Hangzhou, China	

Legend: # – Record awaiting ratification by Asia Aquatics; WR – World record; e – equalled existing record;
Records not set in finals: h – heat; sf – semifinal; r – relay 1st leg; rh – relay heat 1st leg; b – B final; † – en route to final mark; so – swim-off; tt – time trial

=== Women ===
Event	Time		Name	Nationality	Date	Meet	Location	Ref
50 m freestyle	23.48		Siobhan Haughey	Hong Kong	1 October 2026	World Cup	Baku, Azerbaijan	
100 m freestyle	50.79		Siobhan Haughey	Hong Kong	4 December 2021	International Swimming League	Eindhoven, Netherlands	
200 m freestyle	1:50.31		Siobhan Haughey	Hong Kong	16 December 2021	World Championships	Abu Dhabi, United Arab Emirates	
400 m freestyle	3:51.30		Li Bingjie	China	27 October 2022	Chinese Championships	Beijing, China	
800 m freestyle	7:59.44		Wang Jianjiahe	China	6 October 2018	World Cup	Budapest, Hungary	
1500 m freestyle	15:34.09	#	Li Bingjie	China	26 October 2026	Chinese Championships	Beijing, China	
50 m backstroke	25.82		Zhao Jing	China	10 November 2009	World Cup	Stockholm, Sweden	
100 m backstroke	55.23		Shiho Sakai	Japan	15 Nov 2009	World Cup	Berlin, Germany	
200 m backstroke	2:00.18		Shiho Sakai	Japan	14 Nov 2009	World Cup	Berlin, Germany	
50 m breaststroke	28.76		Tang Qianting	China	20 October 2024	World Cup	Shanghai, China	
100 m breaststroke	1:02.37	sf	Tang Qianting	China	11 December 2024	World Championships	Budapest, Hungary	
200 m breaststroke	2:15.76		Rie Kaneto	Japan	9 October 2016	World Cup	Doha, Qatar	
50m butterfly	24.71	=	Rikako Ikee	Japan	13 January 2018	New Year Championships	Tokyo, Japan	
50m butterfly	24.71	=	Zhang Yufei	China	14 December 2022	World Championships	Melbourne, Australia	
100m butterfly	55.25		Lu Ying	China	7 December 2014	World Championships	Doha, Qatar	
100m butterfly	55.17	#	Yu Yiting	China	16 October 2026	World Cup	Astana, Kazakhstan	
100 m butterfly	54.87	#	Zhang Yufei	Jiangsu	27 October 2026	Chinese Championships	Beijing, China	
100m butterfly	55.10	not ratified	Mizuki Hirai	Japan	22 February 2025	Sagamihara City Championships	Sagamihara, Japan	
200m butterfly	2:00.78		Liu Zige	China	15 Nov 2009	World Cup	Berlin, Germany	
100m individual medley	56.99		Yu Yiting	China	1 October 2026	World Cup	Baku, Azerbaijan	
200m individual medley	2:02.63	#	Yu Yiting	China	17 October 2026	World Cup	Astana, Kazakhstan	
400m individual medley	4:22.73		Yui Ohashi	Japan	10 November 2018	World Cup	Tokyo, Japan	
4 × 50 m freestyle relay	1:35.00		Cheng Yujie (24.27); Zhang Yufei (23.12); Zhu Menghui (23.90); Wu Qingfeng (23.71)	China	21 December 2021	World Championships	Abu Dhabi, United Arab Emirates	
4 × 100 m freestyle relay	3:29.81		Tang Yi (52.27); Zhu Qianwei (52.60); Pang Jiaying (52.94); Li Zhesi (52.00)	China	18 Dec 2010	World Championships	Dubai, United Arab Emirates	
4 × 200 m freestyle relay	7:34.08		Li Bingjie (1:54.56); Yang Junxuan (1:53.06); Zhang Yuhan (1:53.94); Wang Jianjiahe (1:52.52)	China	15 December 2018	World Championships	Hangzhou, China	
4 × 50 m medley relay	1:44.31		Fu Yuanhui (26.20); Suo Ran (29.63); Wang Yichun (24.84); Wu Yue (23.64)	China	12 December 2018	World Championships	Hangzhou, China	
4 × 100 m medley relay	3:47.41		Peng Xuwei (57.12); Tang Qianting (1:03.25); Zhang Yufei (54.93); Cheng Yujie (52.11)	China	21 December 2021	World Championships	Abu Dhabi, United Arab Emirates	

Legend: # – Record awaiting ratification by Asia Aquatics; WR – World record; e – equalled existing record;
Records not set in finals: h – heat; sf – semifinal; r – relay 1st leg; rh – relay heat 1st leg; b – B final; † – en route to final mark; so – swim-off; tt – time trial

=== Mixed relay ===
Event	Time		Name	Club	Date	Meet	Location	Ref
4×50 m freestyle relay	1:29.51		Katsumi Nakamura (21.03); Kosuke Matsui (20.90); Aya Sato (23.62); Runa Imai (23.96)	Japan	12 December 2018	World Championships	Hangzhou, China	
4×100 m freestyle relay	3:43.92			Mongolia	10 January 2026	Mongolian Championships		
4×50 m medley relay	1:37.29		Kaiya Seki (23.04); Taku Taniguchi (25.21); Mizuki Hirai (25.07); Yume Jinno (23.91)	Japan	11 December 2024	World Championships	Budapest, Hungary	
4×100 m medley relay	3:37.36	h	Masaki Yura (51.23); Taku Taniguchi (56.44); Mizuki Hirai (56.07); Yume Jinno (53.62)	Japan	14 December 2024	World Championships	Budapest, Hungary	
4×100 m medley relay	3:36.00	AS, #	Xu Jiayu (48.54); Xie Yichen (57.27); Lyu Yue (57.49); Liu Yaxin (52.70)	China	27 October 2026	Chinese Championships	Beijing, China	

Legend: # – Record awaiting ratification by Asia Aquatics; e – equalled existing record;
Records not set in finals: h – heat; so – swim-off
