= Kaito Tabuchi =

Japanese swimmer (born 2002)

Personal information
- Native name: 田渕 海斗
- Nationality: Japanese
- Born: 1 July 2002 (age 24) Japan
- Education: Meiji University

Sport
- Sport: Swimming
- Strokes: Freestyle
- Club: Amagasaki Swimming Team
Medal record
Men's swimming
Representing Japan
Asian Games
Silver medal – second place	2026 Aichi–Nagoya	800 m freestyle
Silver medal – second place	2026 Aichi–Nagoya	1500 m freestyle
World University Games
Gold medal – first place	2021 Chengdu	400 m medley
Silver medal – second place	2021 Chengdu	800 m freestyle
Silver medal – second place	2021 Chengdu	1500 m freestyle

Kaito Tabuchi (Japanese: 田渕 海斗, born 1 July 2002) is a Japanese competitive swimmer who specialises in freestyle events. He represents the Amagasaki Swimming Team and has competed internationally for Japan. He won two silver medals in freestyle events at the 2026 Asian Games and three medals at the 2021 Summer World University Games, including gold in the men's 400-metre individual medley.

== Career ==
Tabuchi represented Japan at the 2021 Summer World University Games, held in Chengdu, China, in 2023 after being postponed. He won the gold medal in the men's 400-metre individual medley and silver medals in the men's 800-metre and 1500-metre freestyle events. His three medals made him one of the most successful Japanese swimmers at the competition.

Tabuchi competed at the 2022 Asian Games, held in Hangzhou, China, in 2023. He finished sixth in the men's 800-metre freestyle and seventh in the men's 400-metre freestyle.

Tabuchi competed at the 2024 World Aquatics Swimming Championships in Budapest, Hungary. He participated in the men's 400-metre individual medley and other events, continuing his international competition in short-course swimming.

In March 2026, Tabuchi won the men's 1500-metre freestyle at the Japanese National Swimming Championships, recording 14:45.57, which was reported as a Japanese national record. He also recorded strong performances in the 400-metre and 800-metre freestyle events during the national season.

At the 2026 Asian Games in Aichi–Nagoya, Japan, Tabuchi won silver medals in both the men's 800-metre and 1500-metre freestyle events. In the 1500-metre final on 22 September, he finished second behind China's Zhang Zhanshuo, while fellow Japanese swimmer Kazushi Imafuku took bronze. Tabuchi also earned silver in the 800-metre freestyle, setting a Japanese national record in the event.
