= Swimming at the 2022 Asian Games – Men's 50 metre backstroke =

Men's 50 metre backstroke at the 2022 Asian Games
- Venue: Hangzhou Olympic Expo Aquatics Center
- Date: 25 September 2023
- Competitors: 32 from 22 nations

Medalists
gold medal	Xu Jiayu	China
silver medal	Wang Gukailai	China
bronze medal	Ryosuke Irie	Japan

The men's 50 metre backstroke event at the 2022 Asian Games took place on 25 September 2023 at the Hangzhou Olympic Expo Center.

== Schedule ==
All times are China Standard Time (UTC+08:00)

Date	Time	Event
Monday, 25 September 2023	10:00	Heats
Monday, 25 September 2023	19:30	Final

== Records ==
Prior to this competition, the existing world, Asian and Games records were as follows.

World Record	Hunter Armstrong (USA)	23.71	Greensboro, United States	28 April 2022
Asian Record	Junya Koga (JPN)	24.24	Rome, Italy	2 August 2009
Games Record	Junya Koga (JPN)	24.28	Incheon, South Korea	22 September 2014

== Results ==
=== Heats ===
Rank	Heat	Athlete	Time	Notes
1	4	Xu Jiayu (CHN)	24.99	
2	3	Wang Gukailai (CHN)	25.18	
2	4	Takeshi Kawamoto (JPN)	25.18	
4	2	Ryosuke Irie (JPN)	25.35	
5	2	Lee Ju-ho (KOR)	25.39	
6	4	Srihari Nataraj (IND)	25.43	
7	3	Chuang Mu-lun (TPE)	25.57	
8	2	Quah Zheng Wen (SGP)	25.71	
9	3	I Gede Siman Sudartawa (INA)	25.77	
10	2	Akalanka Peiris (SRI)	26.01	
11	4	Tonnam Kanteemool (THA)	26.05	
12	4	Jerard Jacinto (PHI)	26.14	
13	4	Merdan Ataýew (TKM)	26.21	
14	2	Lau Shiu Yue (HKG)	26.28	
15	3	Homer Abbasi (IRI)	26.32	
16	4	Farrel Armandio Tangkas (INA)	26.38	
17	3	Ng Cheuk Yin (HKG)	26.46	
18	2	Arvin Shaun Singh Chahal (MAS)	26.56	
19	3	Zachary Tan (SGP)	26.68	
20	4	Antoine de Lapparent (CAM)	26.77	
20	3	Yazan Al-Bawwab (PLE)	26.77	
22	3	Samiul Islam Rafi (BAN)	27.20	
23	2	Ratthawit Thammananthachote (THA)	27.37	
24	2	Abdalla El-Ghamry (QAT)	28.06	
25	1	Chan Si Chon (MAC)	28.93	
26	1	Khash-Erdeniin Tselmeg (MGL)	29.16	
27	1	Ali Imaan (MDV)	29.60	
28	1	Abdulla Al-Khaldi (QAT)	29.90	
29	1	Mohamed Rihan Shiham (MDV)	30.87	
30	1	Umedjon Islomzoda (TJK)	30.95	
31	1	Zakhar Pilkevich (TJK)	30.99	
32	1	Ariunsükhiin Amirlangui (MGL)	36.42	

=== Final ===
Rank	Athlete	Time	Notes
1st place, gold medalist(s)	Xu Jiayu (CHN)	24.38	
2nd place, silver medalist(s)	Wang Gukailai (CHN)	24.88	
3rd place, bronze medalist(s)	Ryosuke Irie (JPN)	25.15	
4	Lee Ju-ho (KOR)	25.35	
5	Takeshi Kawamoto (JPN)	25.36	
6	Srihari Nataraj (IND)	25.39	
7	Chuang Mu-lun (TPE)	25.57	
8	Quah Zheng Wen (SGP)	25.69	
