= Swimming at the 2026 Asian Games – Men's 50 metre backstroke =

Men's 50 metre backstroke at the 2026 Asian Games
- Venue: Tokyo Aquatics Centre
- Date: 21 September 2026
- Competitors: 30 from 18 nations

Medalists
gold medal	Xu Jiayu	China
silver medal	Wang Zicheng	China
bronze medal	Yoon Ji-hwan	South Korea

The men's 50 metre backstroke event at the 2026 Asian Games took place on 21 September 2026 at the Tokyo Aquatics Centre.

== Schedule ==
All times are Japan Standard Time (UTC+09:00)

Date	Time	Event
Monday, 21 September 2026	10:00	Heats
Monday, 21 September 2026	17:00	Final

== Records ==
Prior to this competition, the existing world, Asian and Games records were as follows.

World Record	Kliment Kolesnikov (RUS)	23.55	Kazan, Russia	23 July 2023
Asian Record	Xu Jiayu (CHN)	23.92	Hangzhou, China	17 June 2026
Games Record	Junya Koga (JPN)	24.28	Incheon, South Korea	22 September 2014

== Results ==
=== Heats ===
Rank	Heat	Athlete	Time	Notes
1	3	Xu Jiayu (CHN)	24.64	Q
2	3	Yoon Ji-hwan (KOR)	24.74	Q
3	2	Wang Zicheng (CHN)	24.80	Q
4	3	Tedd Chan (SGP)	24.97	Q, NR
5	2	Jason Yusuf (INA)	25.13	Q
6	3	Chuang Mu-lun (TPE)	25.15	Q, NR
7	1	Stepan Goncharov (BRN)	25.18	Q
8	3	Reo Miura (JPN)	25.19	Q
9	1	Homer Abbasi (IRI)	25.37	Q, NR
=9	2	Srihari Nataraj (IND)	25.37	Q
11	2	Rishabh Das (IND)	25.41	Reserve
12	1	Lee Ju-ho (KOR)	25.61	Reserve
13	1	I Gede Siman Sudartawa (INA)	25.71	
14	1	Hidekazu Takehara (JPN)	25.78	
15	3	Tonnam Kanteemool (THA)	25.98	
16	1	Chan Tsz Chiu (HKG)	26.35	
17	3	Yu Dongqi (HKG)	26.40	
18	1	Lee Julian (SGP)	26.51	
19	2	Mohamad Zubaid (KUW)	26.89	
=19	1	Huang Yu-teng (TPE)	26.89	
21	2	Alexandr Rumynskiy (KAZ)	26.97	
22	2	Abdalla Elghamry (QAT)	27.51	
23	3	Ahmed Helal (BRN)	27.81	
24	3	Antoine De Lapparent (CAM)	28.21	
25	3	Abdulla Alameri (UAE)	28.72	
26	2	Tselmeg Khash-erdene (MGL)	29.47	
27	1	Mohamed Shiham (MDV)	29.64	
28	1	Zakhar Pilkevich (TJK)	31.04	
29	2	Ireeduinbaatar Otgonbaatar (MGL)	31.52	
	2	Gleb Kovalenya (KAZ)	DNS	

=== Final ===
Rank	Athlete	Time	Notes
1st place, gold medalist(s)	Xu Jiayu (CHN)	24.04	GR
2nd place, silver medalist(s)	Wang Zicheng (CHN)	24.49	
3rd place, bronze medalist(s)	Yoon Ji-hwan (KOR)	24.54	
4	Stepan Goncharov (BRN)	24.92	
5	Chuang Mu-lun (TPE)	25.12	NR
6	Jason Yusuf (INA)	25.16	
7	Homer Abbasi (IRI)	25.23	NR
8	Tedd Chan (SGP)	25.37	
9	Reo Miura (JPN)	25.38	
10	Srihari Nataraj (IND)	25.52	
