= Swimming at the 2014 Asian Games – Men's 100 metre backstroke =

Men's 100 metre backstroke at the 2014 Asian Games
- Venue: Munhak Park Tae-hwan Aquatics Center
- Date: 21 September 2014
- Competitors: 22 from 15 nations

Medalists
gold medal	Ryosuke Irie	Japan
silver medal	Xu Jiayu	China
bronze medal	Kosuke Hagino	Japan

The men's 100 metre backstroke event at the 2014 Asian Games took place on 21 September 2014 at Munhak Park Tae-hwan Aquatics Center.

== Schedule ==
All times are Korea Standard Time (UTC+09:00)

Date	Time	Event
Sunday, 21 September 2014	09:00	Heats
Sunday, 21 September 2014	19:26	Final

== Records ==
Prior to this competition, the existing world, Asian and Games records were as follows.

World Record	Aaron Peirsol (USA)	51.94	Indianapolis, United States	8 July 2009
Asian Record	Ryosuke Irie (JPN)	52.24	Kumamoto, Japan	5 September 2009
Games Record	Ryosuke Irie (JPN)	53.61	Guangzhou, China	16 November 2010

== Results ==
=== Heats ===
Rank	Heat	Athlete	Time	Notes
1	2	Ryosuke Irie (JPN)	53.87	
2	3	Xu Jiayu (CHN)	54.60	
3	1	Kosuke Hagino (JPN)	54.86	
4	1	Alexandr Tarabrin (KAZ)	55.51	
5	2	Park Seon-kwan (KOR)	55.72	
6	3	I Gede Siman Sudartawa (INA)	56.35	
7	3	Merdan Ataýew (TKM)	56.63	
8	2	Im Tae-jeong (KOR)	56.74	
9	3	Daniil Bukin (UZB)	56.81	
10	1	Stanislav Ossinskiy (KAZ)	57.08	
10	1	Ngou Pok Man (MAC)	57.08	
12	3	Zhang Yu (CHN)	57.20	
13	1	Rainer Ng (SIN)	57.63	
14	3	Trần Duy Khôi (VIE)	57.74	
15	2	Lin Shih-chieh (TPE)	57.81	
15	3	P. S. Madhu (IND)	57.81	
17	2	Lau Shiu Yue (HKG)	58.02	
18	1	Ricky Anggawijaya (INA)	58.03	
19	2	Jamal Chavoshifar (IRI)	58.23	
20	2	Chung Lai Yeung (HKG)	58.83	
21	1	Wong Pok Iao (MAC)	1:04.35	
22	3	Muhammad Asif (PAK)	1:07.48	

=== Final ===
Rank	Athlete	Time	Notes
1st place, gold medalist(s)	Ryosuke Irie (JPN)	52.34	GR
2nd place, silver medalist(s)	Xu Jiayu (CHN)	52.81	
3rd place, bronze medalist(s)	Kosuke Hagino (JPN)	53.71	
4	Park Seon-kwan (KOR)	54.67	
5	Alexandr Tarabrin (KAZ)	55.43	
6	I Gede Siman Sudartawa (INA)	55.73	
7	Merdan Ataýew (TKM)	56.63	
8	Im Tae-jeong (KOR)	57.07	
