= Swimming at the 2026 Asian Games – Men's 100 metre backstroke =

Men's 100 metre backstroke at the 2026 Asian Games
- Venue: Tokyo Aquatics Centre
- Date: 20 September 2026
- Competitors: 30 from 19 nations

Medalists
gold medal	Xu Jiayu	China
silver medal	Hidekazu Takehara	Japan
bronze medal	Lee Ju-ho	South Korea

The men's 100 metre backstroke event at the 2026 Asian Games took place on 20 September 2026 at the Tokyo Aquatics Centre.

== Schedule ==
All times are Japan Standard Time (UTC+09:00)

Date	Time	Event
Sunday, 20 September 2026	11:01	Heats
Sunday, 20 September 2026	18:13	Final

== Records ==
Prior to this competition, the existing world, Asian and Games records were as follows.

World Record	Thomas Ceccon (ITA)	51.60	Budapest, Hungary	20 June 2022
Asian Record	Xu Jiayu (CHN)	51.86	Qingdao, China	8 April 2017
Games Record	Xu Jiayu (CHN)	52.02	Hangzhou, China	26 September 2023

== Results ==
=== Heats ===
Rank	Heat	Athlete	Time	Notes
1	3	Xu Jiayu (CHN)	52.63	Q
2	2	Hidekazu Takehara (JPN)	54.22	Q
3	3	Lee Ju-ho (KOR)	54.43	Q
4	2	Kodai Nishiono (JPN)	54.73	Q
5	3	Rishabh Das (IND)	54.85	Q
6	1	Jason Donovan Yusuf (INA)	54.89	Q
7	1	Jiang Chenglin (CHN)	54.96	Q
8	3	Yoon Ji-hwan (KOR)	54.97	Q
9	2	Hayden Kwan (HKG)	55.46	Q
10	2	Stepan Goncharov (BRN)	55.54	Q
11	3	Chang Kai-yueh (TPE)	56.11	Reserve
12	3	Utkarsh Patil (IND)	56.19	Reserve
13	1	Tonnam Kanteemool (THA)	56.26	
14	2	Julian Lee (SGP)	56.58	
15	2	Homer Abbasi (IRI)	56.62	
16	1	Farrel Armandio Tangkas (INA)	56.66	
17	2	Alexandr Rumynskiy (KAZ)	56.70	
18	1	Hoe Yean Khiew (MAS)	56.81	
19	1	Zackery Tay (SGP)	56.85	
20	1	Ali Hussain Al-Essa (KSA)	57.35	
20	3	Tsz Chiu Chan (HKG)	57.35	
22	3	Abdalla Elghamry (QAT)	58.94	
23	2	Hou Wa Chan (MAC)	59.30	
24	2	Antoine De lapparent (CAM)	1:00.64	
25	1	Ahmed Helal (BRN)	1:01.26	
26	1	Abdulla Alameri (UAE)	1:02.51	
27	3	Tselmeg Khash-erdene (MGL)	1:05.41	
28	3	Jonon Oyunbat (MGL)	1:05.91	
29	1	Mohamed Shiham (MDV)	1:06.34	
30	2	Zakhar Pilkevich (TJK)	1:08.58	

=== Final ===
Rank	Athlete	Time	Notes
1st place, gold medalist(s)	Xu Jiayu (CHN)	51.98	GR
2nd place, silver medalist(s)	Hidekazu Takehara (JPN)	53.93	
3rd place, bronze medalist(s)	Lee Ju-ho (KOR)	53.94	
4	Kodai Nishiono (JPN)	54.03	
5	Jiang Chenglin (CHN)	54.53	
6	Rishabh Das (IND)	54.77	
7	Hayden Kwan (HKG)	55.11	
8	Stepan Goncharov (BRN)	55.17	
9	Yoon Ji-hwan (KOR)	55.29	
10	Jason Donovan Yusuf (INA)	55.59	
