= List of Iranian records in swimming =

The Iranian records in swimming are the fastest ever performances of swimmers from Iran, which are recognised and ratified by the IR Iran Aquatics.

All records were set in finals unless noted otherwise.

== Long Course (50 m) ==
=== Men ===
Event	Time		Name	Club	Date	Meet	Location	Ref
50 m freestyle	22.41	h	Samyar Abdoli	Iran	1 August 2025	World Championships	Singapore, Singapore	
100 m freestyle	50.34	b	Samyar Abdoli	SSG Saar Max Ritter	26 April 2024	German Championships	Berlin, Germany	
200 m freestyle	1:50.30		Mohammad Ghasemi	Iran	28 September 2025	Asian Championships	Ahmedabad, India	
400 m freestyle	3:53.16		Mohammad Ghasemi	Iran	30 September 2025	Asian Championships	Ahmedabad, India	
800 m freestyle	8:11.83		Mohammad Ghasemi	Iran	1 October 2025	Asian Championships	Ahmedabad, India	
1500 m freestyle	16:06.66		Ali Jafari	Bisp Sea Eagles	23 May 2024	Malaysia Open Championships	Kuala Lumpur, Malaysia	
50 m backstroke	25.23		Homer Abbasi	Iran	21 September 2026	Asian Games	Tokyo, Japan	
100 m backstroke	56.36	sf	Abolfazl Sam	Iran	14 August 2022	Islamic Solidarity Games	Konya, Turkey	
200 m backstroke	2:02.74		Parsa Shahshahani	Iran	1 November 2026	Youth Olympic Games	Dakar, Senegal	
50 m breaststroke	27.28	h	Amir Motaee	Iran	21 September 2026	Asian Games	Tokyo, Japan	
100 m breaststroke	1:00.57		Amir Motaee	Iran	21 September 2026	Asian Games	Tokyo, Japan	
200 m breaststroke	2:15.33	h	Amir Motaee	Elite Sport Club	19 June 2026	International TVN Meet	Gubbio, Italy	
50 m butterfly	24.15		Mehrshad Afghari	Ares Isfahan	2022	Iranian Swimming Pro League	Isfahan, Iran	
100 m butterfly	53.32	h	Mehrshad Afghari	Iran	16 February 2024	World Championships	Doha, Qatar	
200 m butterfly	1:59.97	h	Matin Balsini	Iran	26 July 2021	Olympic Games	Tokyo, Japan	
200 m individual medley	2:05.87	h	Matin Sohran	Iran	24 September 2023	Asian Games	Hangzhou, China	
400 m individual medley	4:35.34		Mohammad Ghasemi	Iran	27 February 2024	Asian Age Group Championships	New Clark City, Philippines	
4×100 m freestyle relay	3:22.46		Sina Gholampour (51.68); Samyar Abdoli (50.78); Alireza Yavari Foroushani (49.92); Matin Sohran (50.08)	Iran	13 August 2022	Islamic Solidarity Games	Konya, Turkey	
4×200 m freestyle relay	7:34.19		Mohammad Ghasemi (1:51.67); Mohammadmahdi Gholami (1:55.30); Ali Rashidpour (1:53.20); Matin Sohran (1:54.02)	Iran	9 November 2025	Islamic Solidarity Games	Riyadh, Saudi Arabia	
4×100 m medley relay	3:43.20	h	Homer Abbasi (56.77); Amir Motae (1:00.47); Mohammad Ghasemi (55.51); Samyar Abdoli (50.45)	Iran	22 September 2026	Asian Games	Tokyo, Japan	

Legend: # – Record awaiting ratification by Iran Amateur Swimming Federation; WR – World record; AS – Asian record; e – equalled existing record;
Records not set in finals: h – heat; sf – semifinal; r – relay 1st leg; rh – relay heat 1st leg; b – B final; † – en route to final mark; so – swim-off; tt – time trial

=== Women ===
Event	Time	Name	Club	Date	Meet	Location	Ref
50 m freestyle							
100 m freestyle							
200 m freestyle							
400 m freestyle							
800 m freestyle							
1500 m freestyle							
50 m backstroke							
100 m backstroke							
200 m backstroke							
50 m breaststroke							
100 m breaststroke							
200 m breaststroke							
50 m butterfly							
100 m butterfly							
200 m butterfly							
200 m individual medley							
400 m individual medley							
4×100 m freestyle relay							
4×200 m freestyle relay							
4×100 m medley relay							

Legend: # – Record awaiting ratification by Iran Amateur Swimming Federation; WR – World record; AS – Asian record; e – equalled existing record;
Records not set in finals: h – heat; sf – semifinal; r – relay 1st leg; rh – relay heat 1st leg; b – B final; † – en route to final mark; so – swim-off; tt – time trial

== Short Course (25 m) ==
=== Men ===
Event	Time		Name	Club	Date	Meet	Location	Ref
50 m freestyle	21.73		Samyar Abdoli	SSG Saar Max Ritter	14 November 2026	German Championships	Wuppertal, Germany	
100 m freestyle	48.60	h	Sina Gholampour	Iran	22 October 2021	World Cup	Doha, Qatar	
200 m freestyle	1:48.42	h	Mohammad Ghasemi	Iran	21 December 2024	Vladimir Salnikov Cup	Saint Petersburg, Russia	
400 m freestyle	3:55.33		Mohammad Ghasemi	Ray Tehran Wave	November 2023	Velayat Cup	Mashhad, Iran	
800 m freestyle	8:11.14	†	Mohammad Ghasemi	Iran	17 December 2023	Vladimir Salnikov Cup	Saint Petersburg, Russia	
1500 m freestyle	15:24.21		Mohammad Ghasemi	Iran	17 December 2023	Vladimir Salnikov Cup	Saint Petersburg, Russia	
50 m backstroke	24.10		Mohamad Parsa Safaei	-	4 September 2026	National Team Qualifying Meet	Mobarakeh, Iran	
100 m backstroke	52.84		Mohamad Parsa Safaei	-	3 September 2026	National Team Qualifying Meet	Mobarakeh, Iran	
200 m backstroke	1:59.23		Abolfazl Sam	Khorasan Razavi	2 September 2022	World Championships Selection	Isfahan, Iran	
50 m breaststroke	26.74		Amir Motaee	Elite Sport Club	6 June 2026	ABA Aquatics Summer Championships	Muscat, Oman	
100 m breaststroke	58.70	h	Amir Motaee	Iran	1 October 2026	World Cup	Baku, Azerbaijan	
200 m breaststroke	2:08.48		Amir Motaee	Elite Sport Club	14 November 2026	BSM Marlins Invitational	Muscat, Oman	
50 m butterfly	23.53	h	Mehrshad Afghari	Isfahan	4 September 2022	World Championships Selection	Isfahan, Iran	
100 m butterfly	51.87	h	Mehrshad Afghari	Iran	17 December 2021	World Championships	Abu Dhabi, United Arab Emirates	
200 m butterfly	1:57.51		Mohammadmehdi Gholami	Iran	29 August 2026	AOSI Championships	Bangkok, Thailand	
100 m individual medley	55.31	tt	Matin Sararan	Isfahan	4 September 2022	World Championships Selection	Isfahan, Iran	
200 m individual medley	2:01.12		Saeed Malekae Ashtiani	Iran	4 November 2009	Asian Indoor Games	Hanoi, Vietnam	
400 m individual medley	4:24.81	h	Saeed Malekae Ashtiani	Iran	16 December 2010	World Championships	Dubai, United Arab Emirates	
4×50m freestyle relay	1:29.90		Pasha Vahdati Rad (22.70); Emin Noshadi (22.32); Gamer Dilanchian (22.57); Saeid Maleka Ashtiani (22.31)	Iran	4 November 2009	Asian Indoor Games	Hanoi, Vietnam	
4×100m freestyle relay	3:17.81		Mohammad Bidarian (49.40); Emin Noshadi (49.10); Pasha Vahdati Rad (49.62); Mohammad Bidarian (49.69)	Iran	5 November 2009	Asian Indoor Games	Hanoi, Vietnam	
4×200m freestyle relay								
4×50m medley relay	1:38.76		Jamal Chavoshifar (25.83); Arya Nasimi Shad (27.31); Mehdi Ansari (23.42); Sina Gholampour (22.20)	Iran	22 September 2017	Asian Indoor and Martial Arts Games	Ashgabat, Turkmenistan	
4×100m medley relay	3:37.31	tt	Abolfazl Sam; Mehran Ghasemzadehasl; Mehrshad Afghari; Sina Gholampour	Iran	4 September 2022	World Championships Selection	Isfahan, Iran	

Legend: # – Record awaiting ratification by Iran Amateur Swimming Federation; WR – World record; AS – Asian record; e – equalled existing record;
Records not set in finals: h – heat; sf – semifinal; r – relay 1st leg; rh – relay heat 1st leg; b – B final; † – en route to final mark; so – swim-off; tt – time trial

=== Women ===
Event	Time	Name	Club	Date	Meet	Location	Ref
50 m freestyle							
100 m freestyle							
200 m freestyle							
400 m freestyle							
800 m freestyle							
1500 m freestyle							
50 m backstroke							
100 m backstroke							
200 m backstroke							
50 m breaststroke							
100 m breaststroke							
200 m breaststroke							
50 m butterfly							
100 m butterfly							
200 m butterfly							
100 m individual medley							
200 m individual medley							
400 m individual medley							
4×50 m freestyle relay							
4×100 m freestyle relay							
4×200 m freestyle relay							
4×50 m medley relay							
4×100 m medley relay							

Legend: # – Record awaiting ratification by Iran Amateur Swimming Federation; WR – World record; AS – Asian record; e – equalled existing record;
Records not set in finals: h – heat; sf – semifinal; r – relay 1st leg; rh – relay heat 1st leg; b – B final; † – en route to final mark; so – swim-off; tt – time trial
