= Swimming at the 2026 Asian Games – Men's 200 metre backstroke =

Men's 200 metre backstroke at the 2026 Asian Games
- Venue: Tokyo Aquatics Centre
- Date: 25 September 2026
- Competitors: 22 from 16 nations

Medalists
| gold medal | Kodai Nishiono | Japan |
| silver medal | Lee Ju-ho | South Korea |
| bronze medal | Xu Jiayu | China |

The men's 200 metre backstroke event at the 2026 Asian Games took place on 25 September 2026 at the Tokyo Aquatics Centre.

== Schedule ==
All times are Japan Standard Time (UTC+09:00)

| Date | Time | Event |
|---|---|---|
| Friday, 25 September 2026 | 10:47 | Heats |
| Friday, 25 September 2026 | 17:25 | Final |

== Records ==
Prior to this competition, the existing world, Asian and Games records were as follows.

| World Record | Aaron Peirsol (USA) | 1:51.92 | Rome, Italy | 31 July 2009 |
| Asian Record | Ryosuke Irie (JPN) | 1:52.51 | Rome, Italy | 31 July 2009 |
| Games Record | Ryosuke Irie (JPN) | 1:53.26 | Incheon, South Korea | 25 September 2014 |

== Results ==
=== Heats ===
| Rank | Heat | Athlete | Time | Notes |
|---|---|---|---|---|
| 1 | 3 | Hidekazu Takehara (JPN) | 1:58.15 | Q |
| 2 | 1 | Lee Ju-ho (KOR) | 1:58.90 | Q |
| 3 | 3 | Song Borui (CHN) | 1:59.59 | Q |
| 4 | 1 | Rishabh Das (IND) | 2:00.53 | Q |
| 5 | 2 | Kodai Nishiono (JPN) | 2:00.64 | Q |
| 6 | 2 | Hayden Kwan (HKG) | 2:01.39 | Q |
| 7 | 3 | Reagan Cheng (SGP) | 2:01.71 | Q |
| 8 | 2 | Xu Jiayu (CHN) | 2:01.78 | Q |
| 9 | 3 | Utkarsh Patil (IND) | 2:02.13 | Q |
| 10 | 2 | Huang Yu-teng (TPE) | 2:03.23 | Q |
| 11 | 1 | Alexandr Rumynskiy (KAZ) | 2:03.33 | Reserve |
| 12 | 3 | Trần Hưng Nguyễn (VIE) | 2:03.57 | Reserve |
| 13 | 2 | Chang Kai-yueh (TPE) | 2:03.70 | |
| 14 | 3 | Farrel Tangkas (INA) | 2:03.73 | |
| 15 | 1 | Tonnam Kanteemool (THA) | 2:04.20 | |
| 16 | 1 | Zackery Tay (SGP) | 2:05.63 | |
| 17 | 2 | Chan Tsz Chiu (HKG) | 2:06.07 | |
| 18 | 1 | Abdalla Elghamry (QAT) | 2:06.78 | |
| 19 | 3 | Mohamed Alyammahi (UAE) | 2:17.99 | |
| 20 | 2 | Jonon Oyunbat (MGL) | 2:22.38 | |
| 21 | 1 | Ireeduinbaatar Otgonbaatar (MGL) | 2:30.49 | |
| | 3 | Munzer Mark Kabbara (LBN) | DNS | |

=== Final ===
| Rank | Athlete | Time | Notes |
|---|---|---|---|
| 1st place, gold medalist(s) | Kodai Nishiono (JPN) | 1:56.42 | |
| 2nd place, silver medalist(s) | Lee Ju-ho (KOR) | 1:56.58 | |
| 3rd place, bronze medalist(s) | Xu Jiayu (CHN) | 1:56.73 | |
| 4 | Song Borui (CHN) | 1:56.89 | |
| 5 | Hidekazu Takehara (JPN) | 1:57.08 | |
| 6 | Rishabh Das (IND) | 1:58.77 | |
| 7 | Utkarsh Patil (IND) | 2:00.94 | |
| 8 | Hayden Kwan (HKG) | 2:01.00 | |
| 9 | Reagan Cheng (SGP) | 2:01.84 | |
| 10 | Huang Yu-teng (TPE) | 2:03.41 | |
