= Swimming at the 2018 Asian Games – Men's 100 metre backstroke =

Men's 100 metre backstroke at the 2018 Asian Games
- Venue: Gelora Bung Karno Aquatic Stadium
- Date: 19 August 2018
- Competitors: 28 from 17 nations

Medalists
gold medal	Xu Jiayu	China
silver medal	Ryosuke Irie	Japan
bronze medal	Lee Ju-ho	South Korea

The men's 100 metre backstroke event at the 2018 Asian Games took place on 19 August at the Gelora Bung Karno Aquatic Stadium.

== Schedule ==
All times are Western Indonesia Time (UTC+07:00)

Date	Time	Event
Sunday, 19 August 2018	09:53	Heats
Sunday, 19 August 2018	18:55	Final

== Records ==
Prior to this competition, the existing world, Asian and Games records were as follows.

World Record	Ryan Murphy (USA)	51.85	Rio de Janeiro, Brazil	13 August 2016
Asian Record	Xu Jiayu (CHN)	51.86	Qingdao, China	12 April 2017
Games Record	Ryosuke Irie (JPN)	52.34	Incheon, South Korea	21 September 2014

== Results ==
=== Heats ===
Rank	Heat	Athlete	Time	Notes
1	4	Xu Jiayu (CHN)	53.60	
2	3	Ryosuke Irie (JPN)	53.85	
3	4	Li Guangyuan (CHN)	54.34	
4	2	Masaki Kaneko (JPN)	54.81	
5	3	Lee Ju-ho (KOR)	55.03	
6	2	Paul Lê Nguyễn (VIE)	55.47	
7	4	I Gede Siman Sudartawa (INA)	55.48	
8	1	Srihari Nataraj (IND)	55.86	
9	4	Francis Fong (SGP)	56.09	
10	3	Merdan Ataýew (TKM)	56.20	
11	2	Kang Ji-seok (KOR)	56.24	
12	2	Chuang Mu-lun (TPE)	56.56	
13	3	Ricky Anggawijaya (INA)	57.33	
14	3	Tern Jian Han (MAS)	57.71	
15	4	Chang Hou-chi (TPE)	57.83	
16	1	Arvind Mani (IND)	58.09	
17	3	Lau Shiu Yue (HKG)	58.38	
18	2	Kasipat Chograthin (THA)	58.55	
19	4	Cheung Yau Ming (HKG)	59.14	
20	4	Haseeb Tariq (PAK)	59.20	
21	2	Abdulaziz Al-Obaidly (QAT)	1:02.28	
22	4	Yum Cheng Man (MAC)	1:02.63	
23	3	Erdenemönkhiin Demüül (MGL)	1:03.80	
24	3	Boldbaataryn Buyantogtokh (MGL)	1:05.43	
25	2	Kawas Behram Aga (PAK)	1:05.51	
26	1	Hassan Al-Obaidan (QAT)	1:08.62	
27	1	Ali Imaan (MDV)	1:10.03	
28	1	Hussain Haish Hassan (MDV)	1:13.65	

=== Final ===
Rank	Athlete	Time	Notes
1st place, gold medalist(s)	Xu Jiayu (CHN)	52.34	=GR
2nd place, silver medalist(s)	Ryosuke Irie (JPN)	52.53	
3rd place, bronze medalist(s)	Lee Ju-ho (KOR)	54.52	
4	Masaki Kaneko (JPN)	54.61	
5	Li Guangyuan (CHN)	55.01	
6	Paul Lê Nguyễn (VIE)	55.72	
7	Srihari Nataraj (IND)	56.19	
8	I Gede Siman Sudartawa (INA)	58.82	
