= Swimming at the 2024 Summer Olympics – Men's 4 × 100-metre medley relay =

Men's 4 × 100 metre medley relay at the Games of the XXXIII Olympiad
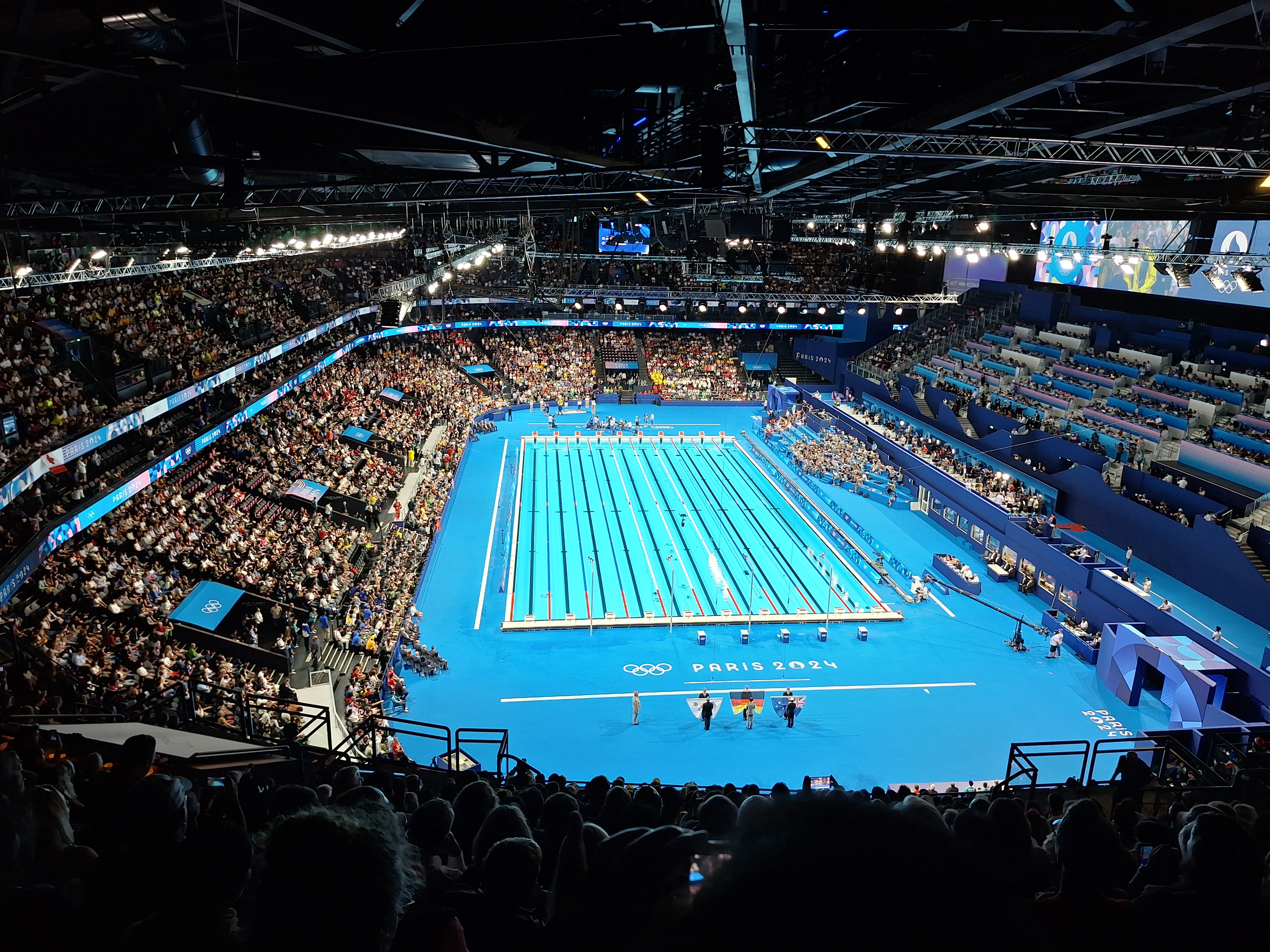
- Paris La Défense Arena after it was converted to a swimming pool for the swimming events
- Venue: Paris La Défense Arena
- Dates: 3 and 4 August 2024 (heats and final)
- Competitors: 74 from 16 nations
- Teams: 16
- Winning time: 3:27.46

Medalists
1st place, gold medalist(s)		Xu Jiayu, Qin Haiyang, Sun Jiajun, Pan Zhanle, Wang Changhao*	China
2nd place, silver medalist(s)		Ryan Murphy, Nic Fink, Caeleb Dressel, Hunter Armstrong, Charlie Swanson*, Thomas Heilman*, Jack Alexy*	United States
3rd place, bronze medalist(s)		Yohann Ndoye-Brouard, Léon Marchand, Maxime Grousset, Florent Manaudou, Clément Secchi*, Rafael Fente-Damers* *Indicates the swimmer only competed in the preliminary heats.	France

The men's 4 × 100 metre medley relay event at the 2024 Summer Olympics was held on 3 and 4 August 2024 at Paris La Défense Arena, which was converted to a swimming pool for the swimming events. Since an Olympic size swimming pool is 50 metres long, each swimmer had to swim two lengths of the pool with their respective stroke. (Note: In medley swimming, each competitor swims one of the four strokes. In a medley relay, the stroke order is backstroke first, followed by breaststroke, then butterfly, and finally freestyle.)

The United States and China were the favourites to win the event, though Great Britain, France and Australia were also in contention to win or medal in the event. All of those teams progressed through to the final.

In the final, China won gold with a time of 3:27.46, the United States won silver with 3:28.01 and France won bronze with 3:28.38. China's win broke the US's Olympic unbeaten streak in this event since the event was introduced in 1960 (this excludes the 1980 games, which were boycotted by the US). Pan Zhanle's finishing leg for China split a time of 45.92 seconds, which was the fastest 100 metre freestyle relay split ever.

== Background ==
Team United States were the defending Olympic champions in the event, and they had won the event at every Olympics since the event was introduced in 1960, except in 1980 when the US boycotted the games. They also won the event at the 2023 World Championships. Team China won the event at the Asian games with a time of 3:27.01, which was 0.23 slower than the US' world record, set at the 2020 Olympics, of 3:26.78. SwimSwam opined that "China is the closest competitor to the US". Other competitors included Australia, the 2023 World Championships bronze medallists; Great Britain, the 2020 Olympics silver medallists; and France.

SwimSwam predicted China would win the event and the US would take second, while Swimming World predicted it would be the other way around. Both predicted Great Britain would finish third.

The event was held at Paris La Défense Arena, which was converted to a swimming pool for the swimming events.

== Qualification ==
Each National Olympic Committee could enter one team, and there were a total of sixteen qualifications places available. The first three qualifying places were taken by the podium finishers at the 2023 World Championships, and the final thirteen qualifying places were allocated to the fastest performances at the 2023 and 2024 World Championships.

== Heats ==
Two heats (preliminary rounds) took place on 3 August 2024, starting at 12:40. (Note: All times are Central European Summer Time (UTC+2)) The teams with the best eight times in the heats advanced to the final. France won the first heat to qualify with the fastest time of 3:31.36, while the United States won the second heat to qualify with the third-fastest time of 3:31.62. China, the Netherlands, Great Britain, Australia, Canada and Germany also qualified. Ireland lowered their national record to 3:33.81 but did not qualify. Spain were disqualified due to the fourth swimmer starting before the third one finished.

Results
Rank	Heat	Lane	Nation	Swimmers	Time	Notes
1	1	5	France	Yohann Ndoye-Brouard (52.99); Léon Marchand (59.03); Clément Secchi (51.39); Rafael Fente-Damers (47.95)	3:31.36	Q
2	1	4	China	Xu Jiayu (53.58); Qin Haiyang (58.51); Wang Changhao (51.75); Pan Zhanle (47.74)	3:31.58	Q
3	2	4	United States	Hunter Armstrong (53.26); Charlie Swanson (59.73); Thomas Heilman (51.15); Jack Alexy (47.48)	3:31.62	Q
4	1	3	Netherlands	Kai van Westering (54.49); Caspar Corbeau (58.94); Nyls Korstanje (50.27); Stan Pijnenburg (48.10)	3:31.80	Q
5	2	3	Great Britain	Oliver Morgan (53.21); Adam Peaty (59.16); Joe Litchfield (51.76); Matthew Richards (48.00)	3:32.13	Q
6	2	5	Australia	Isaac Cooper (53.85); Joshua Yong (58.99); Ben Armbruster (51.61); Kyle Chalmers (47.79)	3:32.24	Q
7	2	2	Canada	Blake Tierney (53.83); Finlay Knox (1:00.34); Ilya Kharun (50.40); Javier Acevedo (47.76)	3:32.33	Q
8	1	6	Germany	Ole Braunschweig (54.05); Lucas Matzerath (59.54); Luca Armbruster (51.01); Josha Salchow (47.91)	3:32.51	Q
9	2	6	Italy	Thomas Ceccon (53.56); Nicolò Martinenghi (59.23); Giacomo Carini (51.75); Alessandro Miressi (48.17)	3:32.71	
10	1	7	Poland	Ksawery Masiuk (53.76); Jan Kałusowski (59.94); Jakub Majerski (51.18); Bartosz Piszczorowicz (48.82)	3:33.70	
11	2	8	Ireland	Conor Ferguson (54.88); Darragh Greene (59.68); Max McCusker (52.04); Shane Ryan (47.21)	3:33.81	NR
12	1	1	Austria	Bernhard Reitshammer (54.97); Valentin Bayer (1:00.02); Simon Bucher (51.16); Heiko Gigler (47.88)	3:34.03	
13	2	1	South Korea	Lee Ju-ho (54.49); Choi Dong-yeol (59.59); Kim Ji-hun (52.62); Hwang Sun-woo (47.98)	3:34.68	
14	1	2	Japan	Riku Matsuyama (55.11); Taku Taniguchi (1:00.22); Naoki Mizunuma (51.63); Katsuhiro Matsumoto (47.88)	3:34.84	
15	1	8	Switzerland	Roman Mityukov (54.27); Jérémy Desplanches (1:00.73); Nils Liess (54.64); Antonio Djakovic (49.10)	3:38.74	
	2	7	Spain	Hugo González; Carles Coll; Mario Mollà; Sergio de Celis	DSQ	

== Final ==
The final took place at 19:10 on 4 August. China's Xu Jiayu swam the fastest opening leg (backstroke), and team China maintained their lead over the second leg (breaststroke). Over the third leg (butterfly), France and the US overtook China. During the final freestyle leg, China's Pan Zhanle passed both France and the US to win the race with a time of 3:27.46. The US won silver in 3:28.01, France won bronze in 3:28.38 and Great Britain finished fourth in 3:29.60. France's 3:28.38 was a new national record.

China's win broke the US's Olympic unbeaten streak in this event since the event was introduced in 1960. Pan's finishing leg split of 45.92 was the fastest 100 metre freestyle relay split ever. It broke Jason Lezak's previous mark of 46.06 and was the first split ever under 46 seconds. The fastest splits for each stroke were Xu's 52.37 backstroke split, Qin Haiyang's 57.98 breaststroke split, Caeleb Dressel's 49.41 butterfly split and Pan's 45.92 freestyle split. The engagement around the event created several trending hashtags on the Chinese social media site Weibo.

Results
Rank	Lane	Country	Competitor	Leg					Overall			Notes
Rank	Lane	Country	Competitor	Time	Rank				Time	Rank	Margin	Notes
Rank	Lane	Country	Competitor	Time	Back	Breast	Fly	Free	Time	Rank	Margin	Notes
1st place, gold medalist(s)	5	China							3:27.46		0.55	
1st place, gold medalist(s)	5-1	China	Xu Jiayu	52.37	1	–			52.37	1	0.07	
1st place, gold medalist(s)	5-2	China	Qin Haiyang	57.98	–	1	–		1:50.35	1	0.64	
1st place, gold medalist(s)	5-3	China	Sun Jiajun	51.19	–		7	–	2:41.54	3	+0.75	
1st place, gold medalist(s)	5-4	China	Pan Zhanle	45.92	–			1	3:27.46	1	0.55	
2nd place, silver medalist(s)	3	United States							3:28.01		+0.55	
2nd place, silver medalist(s)	3-1	United States	Ryan Murphy	52.44	2	–			52.44	2	+0.07	
2nd place, silver medalist(s)	3-2	United States	Nic Fink	58.97	–	4	–		1:51.41	4	+1.06	
2nd place, silver medalist(s)	3-3	United States	Caeleb Dressel	49.41	–		1	–	2:40.82	2	+0.03	
2nd place, silver medalist(s)	3-4	United States	Hunter Armstrong	47.19	–			2	3:28.01	2	+0.55	
3rd place, bronze medalist(s)	4	France							3:28.38		+0.92	NR
3rd place, bronze medalist(s)	4-1	France	Yohann Ndoye-Brouard	52.60	3	–			52.60	3	+0.23	NR
3rd place, bronze medalist(s)	4-2	France	Léon Marchand	58.62	–	3	–		1:51.22	3	+0.87	NR
3rd place, bronze medalist(s)	4-3	France	Maxime Grousset	49.57	–		2	–	2:40.79	1	0.03	NR
3rd place, bronze medalist(s)	4-4	France	Florent Manaudou	47.59	–			6	3:28.38	3	+0.92	NR
4	2	Great Britain							3:29.60		+2.14	
4	2-1	Great Britain	Oliver Morgan	52.83	4	–			52.83	4	+0.46	
4	2-2	Great Britain	Adam Peaty	58.16	–	2	–		1:50.99	2	+0.64	
4	2-3	Great Britain	Duncan Scott	51.30	–		8	–	2:42.29	4	+1.50	
4	2-4	Great Britain	Matthew Richards	47.31	–			3	3:29.60	4	+2.14	
5	1	Canada							3:31.27		+3.81	
5	1-1	Canada	Blake Tierney	53.75	5	–			53.75	5	+1.38	
5	1-2	Canada	Finlay Knox	59.75	–	8	–		1:53.50	5	+3.19	
5	1-3	Canada	Ilya Kharun	50.46	–		3	–	2:43.96	5	+3.17	
5	1-4	Canada	Josh Liendo	47.31	–			3	3:31.27	5	+3.81	
6	7	Australia							3:31.86		+4.40	
6	7-1	Australia	Isaac Cooper	54.28	6	–			54.28	6	+1.91	
6	7-2	Australia	Joshua Yong	59.26	–	6	–		1:53.54	6	+3.19	
6	7-3	Australia	Matthew Temple	50.89	–		5	–	2:44.43	7	+3.64	
6	7-4	Australia	Kyle Chalmers	47.43	–			5	3:31.86	6	+4.40	
7	8	Germany							3:32.46		+5.00	
7	8-1	Germany	Ole Braunschweig	54.38	7	–			54.38	7	+2.01	
7	8-2	Germany	Melvin Imoudu	59.37	–	7	–		1:53.75	7	+3.40	
7	8-3	Germany	Luca Armbruster	50.96	–		6	–	2:44.71	8	+3.92	
7	8-4	Germany	Josha Salchow	47.75	–			7	3:32.46	7	+5.00	
8	6	Netherlands							3:32.52		+5.06	
8	6-1	Netherlands	Kai van Westering	54.60	8	–			54.60	8	+2.23	
8	6-2	Netherlands	Caspar Corbeau	59.19	–	5	–		1:53.79	8	+3.44	
8	6-3	Netherlands	Nyls Korstanje	50.60	–		4	–	2:44.39	6	+3.60	
8	6-4	Netherlands	Stan Pijnenburg	48.13	–			8	3:32.52	8	+5.06	
