= Swimming at the 2022 Asian Games – Men's 100 metre backstroke =

Men's 100 metre backstroke at the 2022 Asian Games
- Venue: Hangzhou Olympic Expo Aquatics Center
- Date: 24 September 2023
- Competitors: 29 from 21 nations

Medalists
gold medal	Xu Jiayu	China
silver medal	Ryosuke Irie	Japan
bronze medal	Lee Ju-ho	South Korea

The men's 100 metre backstroke event at the 2022 Asian Games took place on 24 September 2023 at the Hangzhou Olympic Expo Center.

== Schedule ==
All times are China Standard Time (UTC+08:00)

Date	Time	Event
Sunday, 24 September 2023	11:22	Heats
Sunday, 24 September 2023	20:47	Final

== Records ==
Prior to this competition, the existing world, Asian and Games records were as follows.

World Record	Thomas Ceccon (ITA)	51.60	Budapest, Hungary	20 June 2022
Asian Record	Xu Jiayu (CHN)	51.86	Qingdao, China	12 April 2017
Games Record	Ryosuke Irie (JPN); Xu Jiayu (CHN)	52.34	Incheon, South Korea; Jakarta, Indonesia	21 September 2014; 19 August 2018

== Results ==
Legend

- DNS — Did not start

=== Heats ===
Rank	Heat	Athlete	Time	Notes
1	4	Xu Jiayu (CHN)	53.68	
2	2	Lee Ju-ho (KOR)	54.06	
3	3	Ryosuke Irie (JPN)	54.11	
4	3	Wang Gukailai (CHN)	54.28	
5	4	Srihari Nataraj (IND)	54.71	
6	2	Daiki Yanagawa (JPN)	55.01	
7	4	Chuang Mu-lun (TPE)	55.06	
8	3	Tonnam Kanteemool (THA)	56.02	
9	2	Hayden Kwan (HKG)	56.28	
10	3	Merdan Ataýew (TKM)	56.37	
11	3	Farrel Armandio Tangkas (INA)	56.70	
12	4	Zachary Tan (SGP)	57.08	
13	2	Lau Shiu Yue (HKG)	57.34	
14	4	Zackery Tay (SGP)	57.47	
15	4	Jerard Jacinto (PHI)	57.57	
16	3	Hii Puong Wei (MAS)	57.67	
17	4	Yazan Al-Bawwab (PLE)	57.72	
18	3	Homer Abbasi (IRI)	58.20	
19	2	Ratthawit Thammananthachote (THA)	58.32	
20	2	Utkarsh Santosh Patil (IND)	59.42	
21	4	Samiul Islam Rafi (BAN)	1:00.02	
22	2	Abdalla El-Ghamry (QAT)	1:00.04	
23	3	Antoine de Lapparent (CAM)	1:02.66	
24	1	Khash-Erdeniin Tselmeg (MGL)	1:02.79	
25	2	Chan Si Chon (MAC)	1:03.21	
26	1	Ali Imaan (MDV)	1:04.64	
27	1	Zakhar Pilkevich (TJK)	1:10.01	
28	1	Narmandakhyn Khishigbayar (MGL)	1:15.53	
—	1	Umedjon Islomzoda (TJK)	DNS	

=== Final ===
Rank	Athlete	Time	Notes
1st place, gold medalist(s)	Xu Jiayu (CHN)	52.23	GR
2nd place, silver medalist(s)	Ryosuke Irie (JPN)	53.46	
3rd place, bronze medalist(s)	Lee Ju-ho (KOR)	53.54	
4	Wang Gukailai (CHN)	54.00	
5	Daiki Yanagawa (JPN)	54.44	
6	Srihari Nataraj (IND)	54.48	
7	Chuang Mu-lun (TPE)	54.88	
8	Tonnam Kanteemool (THA)	55.73	
