= List of Qatari records in swimming =

The Qatari records in swimming are the fastest-ever performances by a swimmer from Qatar. These records are recognized and maintained by the Qatar Swimming Association (QSA).

Records are currently listed for the following events:

- freestyle: 50, 100, 200, 400, 800 and 1500;
- backstroke: 50, 100 and 200;
- breaststroke: 50, 100 and 200;
- butterfly: 50, 100 and 200;
- individual medley: 100 (25m only), 200 and 400;
- relays: 4x100 free, 4x200 free, and 4 × 100 medley.

All records were set in finals unless noted otherwise.

== Long Course (50 m) ==
=== Men ===
Event	Time		Name	Club	Date	Meet	Location	Ref
50 m freestyle	22.45		Ali Sayed	Qatar	29 September 2025	Asian Championships	Ahmedabad, India	
100 m freestyle	48.63		Ali Sayed	Qatar	20 September 2026	Asian Games	Tokyo, Japan	
200 m freestyle	1:48.00		Ali Sayed	Qatar	23 September 2026	Asian Games	Tokyo, Japan	
400 m freestyle	3:49.71		Saadeddin Saadeddin	Qatar	25 September 2026	Asian Games	Tokyo, Japan	
800 m freestyle	7:57.54		Saadeddin Saadeddin	Qatar	12 May 2026	GCC Games	Doha, Qatar	
1500 m freestyle	15:19.77		Saadeddin Saadeddin	Qatar	15 May 2026	GCC Games	Doha, Qatar	
50 m backstroke	26.19		Abdalla El-Ghamry	Qatar	15 May 2026	GCC Games	Doha, Qatar	
100 m backstroke	58.32	h	Abdalla El-Ghamry	Qatar	12 May 2026 (Note: by official result source; 13 May 2026 by QSA source, a typo)	GCC Games	Doha, Qatar	
100 m backstroke	58.29	r, #	Abdalla El-Ghamry	Qatar	15 May 2026	GCC Games	Doha, Qatar	
200 m backstroke	2:05.91		Abdalla El-Ghamry	Qatar	13 May 2026	GCC Games	Doha, Qatar	
50 m breaststroke	27.81	h	Mahmoud Mohamed	Qatar	29 September 2025	Asian Championships	Ahmedabad, India	
100 m breaststroke	1:02.72		Mahmoud Mohamed	C.N. Las Palmas	28 June 2025	Absolute and Junior Summer Regional Championship	Las Palmas, Spain	
200 m breaststroke	2:19.20		Adam Morsy	Qatar	18 July 2026	Asian Age Group Championships	Samutprakan, Thailand	
200 m breaststroke	2:17.07	#	Adam Morsy	Qatar	2 November 2026	Youth Olympic Games	Dakar, Senegal	
50 m butterfly	24.11		Ali Sayed	Qatar	28 August 2025	Arab Championships	Casablanca, Morocco	
100 m butterfly	53.54	b	Ali Sayed	Club Aquatique Montreal	8 June 2025	Canadian Trials	Victoria, Canada	
100 m butterfly	53.23	not ratified	Abdulaziz Al-Obaidly	-	25 February 2018	Greek Winter Championships	Greece	
200 m butterfly	2:02.20		Emile Fouzai	Qatar	12 May 2026	GCC Games	Doha, Qatar	
200 m individual medley	2:02.51	h	Mahmoud Mohamed	Qatar	20 September 2026	Asian Games	Tokyo, Japan	
400 m individual medley	4:32.69		Emile Fouzai	Qatar	14 May 2026	GCC Games	Doha, Qatar	
4×50 m freestyle relay	1:52.93	not ratified		Al Saad	1 January 2013	-	Doha, Qatar	
4×100 m freestyle relay	3:23.01 (Note: by official result source; 3:23.02 by QSA source, a typo)		Ali Sayed (50.38); Tameem Elhamayda (51.20); Emile Fouzai (51.60); Mahmoud Mohamed (49.83)	Qatar	13 May 2026	GCC Games	Doha, Qatar	
4×200 m freestyle relay	7:20.25		Saadeddin Saadeddin (1:50.14); Emile Fouzai (1:50.94); Mahmoud Mohamed (1:50.61); Ali Sayed (1:48.56)	Qatar	21 September 2026	Asian Games	Tokyo, Japan	
4×50 m medley relay	2:09.30	not ratified		Al Saad	3 March 2013	-	Doha, Qatar	
4×100 m medley relay	3:45.66		Abdalla Elghamry (58.29); Mahmoud Mohamed (1:03.61); Tameem Elhamayda (54.62); Ali Sayed (49.14)	Qatar	15 May 2026	GCC Games	Doha, Qatar	

Legend: # – Record awaiting ratification by QSA; WR – World record; AS – Asian record; e – equalled existing record;
Records not set in finals: h – heat; sf – semifinal; r – relay 1st leg; rh – relay heat 1st leg; b – B final; † – en route to final mark; so – swim-off; tt – time trial

=== Women ===
Event	Time		Name	Club	Date	Meet	Location	Ref
50m freestyle	28.86	h	Kaitlyn De Zilwa	Qatar	27 February 2024	Asian Age Group Championships	New Clark City, Philippines	
100m freestyle	1:02.71		Jessie Sarangel Seneviratne	Qatar	29 February 2024	Asian Age Group Championships	New Clark City, Philippines	
200m freestyle	2:12.49	h	Yalindi Minagi Rupesinghe	Qatar	26 February 2024	Asian Age Group Championships	New Clark City, Philippines	
400 m freestyle								
800 m freestyle								
1500 m freestyle								
50 m backstroke								
100 m backstroke								
200 m backstroke								
50 m breaststroke								
100 m breaststroke								
200 m breaststroke								
50m butterfly	33.69	h, †	Nada Arkaji	Qatar	2 August 2015	World Championships	Kazan, Russia	
100m butterfly	1:17.30	h	Nada Arkaji	Qatar	2 August 2015	World Championships	Kazan, Russia	
200 m butterfly								
200 m individual medley								
400 m individual medley								
4×100 m freestyle relay								
4×200 m freestyle relay								
4×100 m medley relay								

Legend: # – Record awaiting ratification by QSA; WR – World record; AS – Asian record; e – equalled existing record;
Records not set in finals: h – heat; sf – semifinal; r – relay 1st leg; rh – relay heat 1st leg; b – B final; † – en route to final mark; so – swim-off; tt – time trial

== Short Course (25 m) ==
=== Men ===
Event	Time		Name	Club	Date	Meet	Location	Ref
50 m freestyle	21.87		Ali Sayed	Club Aquatique Montreal	7 June 2026	Canadian Team Festival - Section 1	Montreal, Canada	
100 m freestyle	47.69		Ali Sayed	Club Aquatique Montreal	28 June 2025	Canadian Team Festival - Section 1	Montreal, Canada	
200 m freestyle	1:46.40		Ali Sayed	Club Aquatique Montreal	18 October 2026	Decathlon DSC	Montreal, Canada	
400 m freestyle	3:48.00		Émile Fouzaï	Zpc Amersfoort	22 October 2026	Dutch Qualifiers	Rotterdam, Netherlands	
800 m freestyle	7:57.73		Émile Fouzaï	Zpc Amersfoort	23 October 2026	Dutch Qualifiers	Rotterdam, Netherlands	
1500 m freestyle	15:24.85		Émile Fouzaï	Zpc Amersfoort	9 October 2026	International Festival	Aachen, Germany	
50m backstroke	24.46		Ali Sayed	Qatar	25 October 2025	Dolphin Cup	Ljubljana, Slovenia	
100m backstroke	55.87		Abdullah Al-Ghamri	-	21 November 2025	-	Doha, Qatar	
200m backstroke	2:03.60	h	Abdulaziz Al-Obaidly	Qatar	21 October 2022	World Cup	Berlin, Germany	
50m breaststroke	27.57		Ali Sayed	Club Aquatique Montreal	5 June 2026	Canadian Team Festival - Section 1	Montreal, Canada	
100m breaststroke	1:00.41		Ali Sayed	Club Aquatique Montreal	7 June 2026	Canadian Team Festival - Section 1	Montreal, Canada	
200m breaststroke	2:13.94		Abdulaziz Al-Obaidly	Qatar	26 October 2021	Arab Championships	Abu Dhabi, United Arab Emirates	
50m butterfly	23.51		Ali Sayed	Club Aquatique Montreal	6 June 2026	Canadian Team Festival - Section 1	Montreal, Canada	
100m butterfly	52.52		Ali Sayed	Club Aquatique Montreal	27 June 2025	Canadian Team Festival - Section 1	Montreal, Canada	
200m butterfly	2:00.16		Émile Fouzaï	Zpc Amersfoort	10 October 2026	International Festival	Aachen, Germany	
100m individual medley	54.49	h	Mohamed Mohmond	Qatar	11 October 2025	International Meeting of Saint-Dizier	Saint-Dizier, France	
200m individual medley	2:00.62	h	Mohamed Mohmond	Qatar	19 October 2024	World Cup	Shanghai, China	
400m individual medley	4:24.90		Abdulaziz Al-Obaidly	Qatar	27 October 2021	Arab Championships	Abu Dhabi, United Arab Emirates	
4×50m freestyle relay	1:40.77	h	Abdalla Aboughazala (24.79); Naser Hassaan (24.50); Firas Binmourad Saidi (24.64); A. Al-Obaidly (26.84)	Qatar	24 September 2017	Asian Indoor and Martial Arts Games	Ashgabat, Turkmenistan	
4×100m freestyle relay	3:35.43			Qatar	4 February 2016	GCC Championships	Doha, Qatar	
4×200m freestyle relay	7:50.46			Qatar	3 February 2016	GCC Championships	Doha, Qatar	
4×50m medley relay	1:50.98	h	A. Al-Obaidly (29.47); Naser Hassaan (29.89); A. Aboughazala (26.49); Firas Saidi (25.13)	Qatar	22 September 2017	Asian Indoor and Martial Arts Games	Ashgabat, Turkmenistan	
4×100m medley relay	4:09.26			Qatar	3 February 2016	GCC Championships	Doha, Qatar	

Legend: # – Record awaiting ratification by QSA; WR – World record; AS – Asian record; e – equalled existing record;
Records not set in finals: h – heat; sf – semifinal; r – relay 1st leg; rh – relay heat 1st leg; b – B final; † – en route to final mark; so – swim-off; tt – time trial

=== Women ===
Event	Time		Name	Club	Date	Meet	Location	Ref
50 m freestyle	30.59	h	Nada Arkaji	Qatar	6 December 2014	World Championships	Doha, Qatar	
100 m freestyle								
200 m freestyle								
400 m freestyle								
800 m freestyle								
1500 m freestyle								
50 m backstroke	35.65		Nawifa Al-Azam	Qatar	2006			
100 m backstroke	1:20.31		Nawifa Al-Azam	Qatar	2006			
200 m backstroke								
50 m breaststroke								
100 m breaststroke	1:31.19		Nada Arkaji	Qatar	2012			
200 m breaststroke								
50 m butterfly	33.09	h	Nada Arkaji	Qatar	4 December 2014	World Championships	Doha, Qatar	
100 m butterfly								
200 m butterfly								
100 m individual medley								
200 m individual medley								
400 m individual medley								
4×50 m freestyle relay								
4×100 m freestyle relay								
4×200 m freestyle relay								
4×50 m medley relay								
4×100 m medley relay								

Legend: # – Record awaiting ratification by QSA; WR – World record; AS – Asian record; e – equalled existing record;
Records not set in finals: h – heat; sf – semifinal; r – relay 1st leg; rh – relay heat 1st leg; b – B final; † – en route to final mark; so – swim-off; tt – time trial
