= Swimming at the 2018 Asian Games – Men's 50 metre backstroke =

Men's 50 metre backstroke at the 2018 Asian Games
- Venue: Gelora Bung Karno Aquatic Stadium
- Date: 20 August 2018
- Competitors: 38 from 23 nations

Medalists
gold medal	Xu Jiayu	China
silver medal	Ryosuke Irie	Japan
bronze medal	Kang Ji-seok	South Korea

The men's 50 metre backstroke event at the 2018 Asian Games took place on 20 August at the Gelora Bung Karno Aquatic Stadium.

== Schedule ==
All times are Western Indonesia Time (UTC+07:00)

Date	Time	Event
Monday, 20 August 2018	09:22	Heats
Monday, 20 August 2018	18:28	Final

== Records ==
Prior to this competition, the existing world, Asian and Games records were as follows.

World Record	Kliment Kolesnikov (RUS)	24.00	Glasgow, United Kingdom	4 August 2018
Asian Record	Junya Koga (JPN)	24.24	Rome, Italy	2 August 2009
Games Record	Junya Koga (JPN)	24.28	Incheon, South Korea	22 September 2014

== Results ==
=== Heats ===
Rank	Heat	Athlete	Time	Notes
1	3	I Gede Siman Sudartawa (INA)	25.01	
2	5	Xu Jiayu (CHN)	25.12	
3	5	Ryosuke Irie (JPN)	25.25	
4	4	Kang Ji-seok (KOR)	25.29	
5	3	Wang Peng (CHN)	25.33	
6	4	Quah Zheng Wen (SGP)	25.54	
7	4	Lee Ju-ho (KOR)	25.67	
8	3	Merdan Ataýew (TKM)	26.08	
9	4	Kasipat Chograthin (THA)	26.13	
10	1	Srihari Nataraj (IND)	26.19	
11	5	Paul Lê Nguyễn (VIE)	26.20	
12	5	Masaki Kaneko (JPN)	26.23	
13	5	Adil Kaskabay (KAZ)	26.30	
14	4	Francis Fong (SGP)	26.48	
15	4	Chuang Mu-lun (TPE)	26.52	
16	4	Ngou Pok Man (MAC)	26.53	
17	3	Akalanka Peiris (SRI)	26.57	
18	3	Chang Hou-chi (TPE)	26.67	
19	5	Ricky Anggawijaya (INA)	26.82	
20	3	Tern Jian Han (MAS)	26.88	
21	1	Arvind Mani (IND)	26.89	
22	5	Lau Shiu Yue (HKG)	26.93	
23	3	Cheung Yau Ming (HKG)	26.99	
24	5	Haseeb Tariq (PAK)	27.31	
25	4	Navaphat Wongcharoen (THA)	27.37	
26	3	Mohammed Bedour (JOR)	27.40	
27	1	Noah Al-Khulaifi (QAT)	28.75	
28	2	Abdulaziz Al-Obaidly (QAT)	28.78	
29	2	Muhammad Yahya Khan (PAK)	28.79	
30	2	Yum Cheng Man (MAC)	28.88	
31	2	Boldbaataryn Buyantogtokh (MGL)	29.72	
32	2	Lim Keouodom (CAM)	30.68	
33	2	Santisouk Inthavong (LAO)	31.09	
34	1	Olimjon Ishanov (TJK)	31.87	
35	2	Hussain Haish Hassan (MDV)	31.95	
36	1	Ali Imaan (MDV)	32.47	
37	1	Ramziyor Khorkashov (TJK)	33.21	
38	2	Buman-Uchralyn Bat-Od (MGL)	33.56	

=== Final ===
Rank	Athlete	Time	Notes
1st place, gold medalist(s)	Xu Jiayu (CHN)	24.75	
2nd place, silver medalist(s)	Ryosuke Irie (JPN)	24.88	
3rd place, bronze medalist(s)	Kang Ji-seok (KOR)	25.17	
4	Wang Peng (CHN)	25.28	
5	I Gede Siman Sudartawa (INA)	25.29	
6	Quah Zheng Wen (SGP)	25.53	
7	Lee Ju-ho (KOR)	25.59	
8	Merdan Ataýew (TKM)	25.88	
