= Swimming at the 2014 Asian Games – Men's 50 metre backstroke =

Men's 50 metre backstroke at the 2014 Asian Games
- Venue: Munhak Park Tae-hwan Aquatics Center
- Date: 22 September 2014
- Competitors: 26 from 19 nations

Medalists
gold medal	Junya Koga	Japan
silver medal	Ryosuke Irie	Japan
bronze medal	Xu Jiayu	China

The men's 50 metre backstroke event at the 2014 Asian Games took place on 22 September 2014 at Munhak Park Tae-hwan Aquatics Center.

== Schedule ==
All times are Korea Standard Time (UTC+09:00)

Date	Time	Event
Monday, 22 September 2014	09:00	Heats
Monday, 22 September 2014	19:06	Final

== Records ==
Prior to this competition, the existing world, Asian and Games records were as follows.

World Record	Liam Tancock (GBR)	24.04	Rome, Italy	2 August 2009
Asian Record	Junya Koga (JPN)	24.24	Rome, Italy	2 August 2009
Games Record	Junya Koga (JPN)	25.08	Guangzhou, China	18 November 2010

== Results ==
=== Heats ===
Rank	Heat	Athlete	Time	Notes
1	3	Junya Koga (JPN)	24.46	GR
2	4	Xu Jiayu (CHN)	25.04	
3	2	Ryosuke Irie (JPN)	25.07	
4	2	I Gede Siman Sudartawa (INA)	25.40	
5	3	Park Seon-kwan (KOR)	25.60	
6	4	Sun Xiaolei (CHN)	25.68	
6	4	Alexandr Tarabrin (KAZ)	25.68	
8	2	Merdan Ataýew (TKM)	26.31	
8	3	Daniil Bukin (UZB)	26.31	
10	3	Ngou Pok Man (MAC)	26.54	
11	4	Lau Shiu Yue (HKG)	26.55	
12	3	Chung Lai Yeung (HKG)	26.56	
12	4	Stanislav Ossinskiy (KAZ)	26.56	
14	2	Jamal Chavoshifar (IRI)	26.77	
15	2	Ricky Anggawijaya (INA)	26.84	
16	3	P. S. Madhu (IND)	26.85	
17	4	Rainer Ng (SIN)	26.94	
18	2	Yuan Ping (TPE)	26.95	
19	2	Mohammed Al-Ghaferi (UAE)	27.59	
20	4	Mohammed Abdo (PLE)	29.29	
21	3	Wong Pok Iao (MAC)	29.54	
22	1	Trần Duy Khôi (VIE)	30.44	
23	4	Muhammad Asif (PAK)	31.49	
24	3	Nishwan Ibrahim (MDV)	34.11	
25	1	Yousef Al-Washali (YEM)	35.89	
26	1	Ismail Muthasim Adnan (MDV)	37.62	

=== Swim-off ===
Rank	Athlete	Time	Notes
1	Daniil Bukin (UZB)	26.27	
2	Merdan Ataýew (TKM)	26.40	

=== Final ===
Rank	Athlete	Time	Notes
1st place, gold medalist(s)	Junya Koga (JPN)	24.28	GR
2nd place, silver medalist(s)	Ryosuke Irie (JPN)	24.98	
3rd place, bronze medalist(s)	Xu Jiayu (CHN)	25.24	
4	I Gede Siman Sudartawa (INA)	25.42	
5	Park Seon-kwan (KOR)	25.44	
6	Sun Xiaolei (CHN)	25.46	
7	Alexandr Tarabrin (KAZ)	25.77	
8	Daniil Bukin (UZB)	26.25	
