= 2024 Asian Age Group Aquatics Championships =

Sporting event in Capas, Philippines

11th Asian Age Group Aquatics Championships
- Host city: Capas (Note: For marketing purposes, New Clark City, a development within the municipality of Capas, Tarlac, is designated as the host "city".), Philippines
- Date(s): February 26 – March 9, 2024
- Venue(s): 1
- Athletes participating: 1,200, from 30 nations

The 11th Asian Age Group Aquatics Championships was held from February 26 to March 9, 2024, at New Clark City in Capas, Philippines.

== Host selection ==
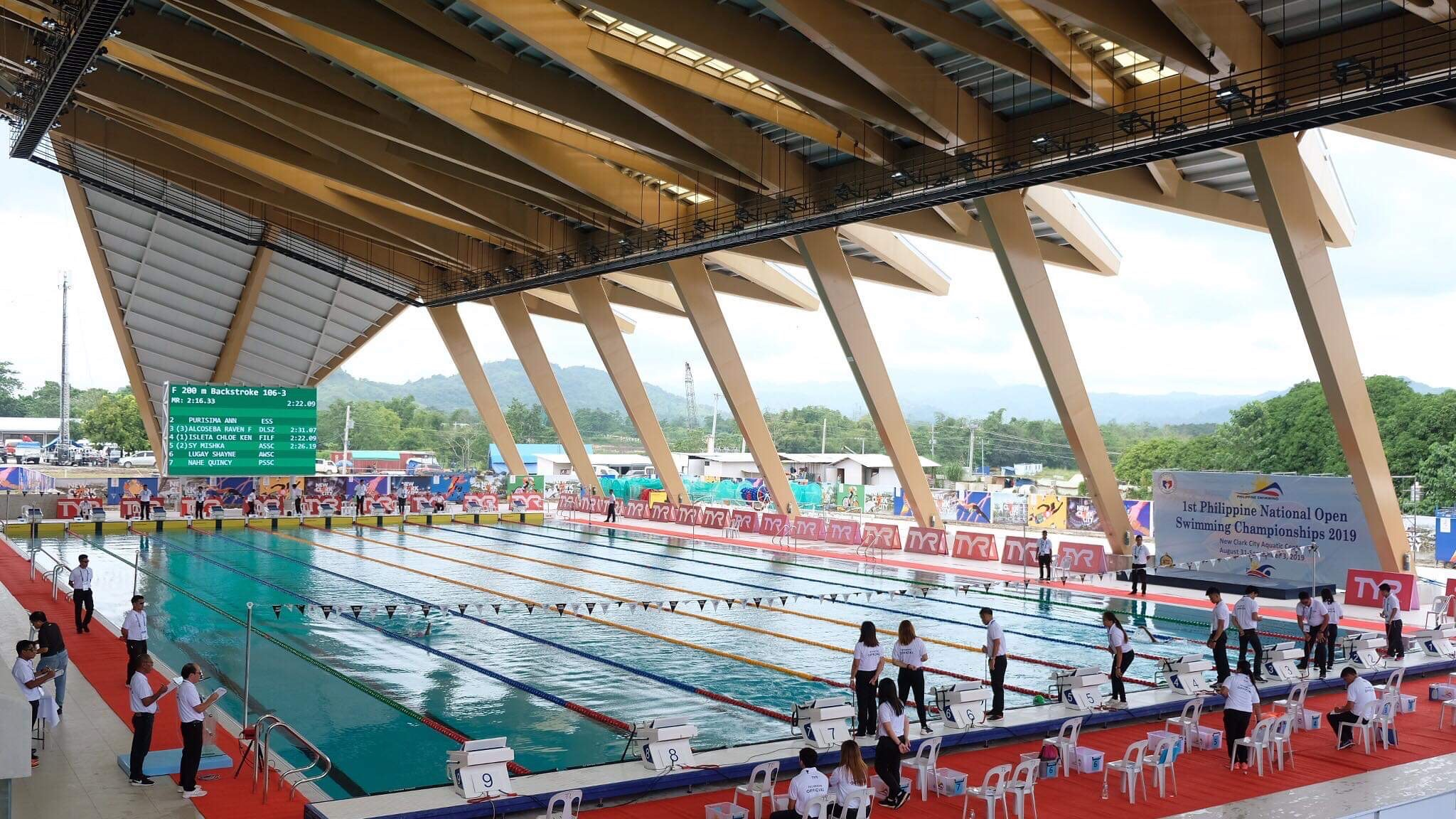
New Clark City Aquatics Center, the venue for the championships

The Asia Aquatics said they were considering three Asian countries as possible host of the event: Vietnam, Thailand, and the Philippines. In the end, the Philippines was chosen because of the newly built and the first FINA-certified facility of the country, the New Clark City Aquatic Center, which had been used as a venue for aquatics events at the 2019 Southeast Asian Games. In December 2019, the AASF, Philippine Swimming (later replaced by Philippine Aquatics), the Bases Conversion and Development Authority, and the Philippine Sports Commission signed a partnership agreement for the Philippines to host the event.

== Postponement ==
The Philippines was originally chosen to host the Asian Swimming Championships, scheduled to be held from November 7 to 17, 2020, at the new aquatic facilities in New Clark City. However, due to the COVID-19 pandemic, it was rescheduled to November 7–17, 2021. It was then further postponed to 2023.

In October 2023, a request was made by the local organizing committee to Asia Aquatics to further postpone the Asian Age Group Aquatics Championships to February 2024.

== Ages ==
1. under 14
2. under 18
3. +18

== Schedules ==
Source:

== Results ==
=== Medal table ===
Last update: March 10, 2024

Rank	Nation	Gold	Silver	Bronze	Total
1	Japan	46	21	8	75
2	Kazakhstan	30	20	8	58
3	Thailand	19	16	25	60
4	Vietnam	15	22	30	67
5	Hong Kong	15	19	16	50
6	China	9	8	3	20
7	India	6	11	4	21
8	Malaysia	5	6	11	22
9	Chinese Taipei	4	16	17	37
10	Iran	3	8	8	19
11	Uzbekistan	2	5	8	15
12	Macau	2	1	1	4
13	Kyrgyzstan	2	0	0	2
14	Philippines	1	1	4	6
15	Singapore	0	1	4	5
16	Indonesia	0	1	0	1
17	Qatar	0	0	3	3
18	Mongolia	0	0	2	2
19	Jordan	0	0	1	1
19	Kuwait	0	0	1	1
19	Sri Lanka	0	0	1	1
22	Afghanistan	0	0	0	0
22	Brunei	0	0	0	0
22	Iraq	0	0	0	0
22	Maldives	0	0	0	0
22	Oman	0	0	0	0
22	Pakistan	0	0	0	0
22	Saudi Arabia	0	0	0	0
22	Syria	0	0	0	0
22	United Arab Emirates	0	0	0	0
Totals (30 entries)		159	156	155	470
