= Swimming at the 2014 Asian Games – Men's 200 metre backstroke =

Men's 200 metre backstroke at the 2014 Asian Games
- Venue: Munhak Park Tae-hwan Aquatics Center
- Date: 25 September 2014
- Competitors: 15 from 11 nations

Medalists
gold medal	Ryosuke Irie	Japan
silver medal	Xu Jiayu	China
bronze medal	Kosuke Hagino	Japan

The men's 200 metre backstroke event at the 2014 Asian Games took place on 25 September 2014 at Munhak Park Tae-hwan Aquatics Center.

== Schedule ==
All times are Korea Standard Time (UTC+09:00)

Date	Time	Event
Tuesday, 25 September 2014	09:00	Heats
Tuesday, 25 September 2014	20:03	Final

== Records ==
Prior to this competition, the existing world, Asian and Games records were as follows.

World Record	Aaron Peirsol (USA)	1:51.92	Rome, Italy	31 July 2009
Asian Record	Ryosuke Irie (JPN)	1:52.51	Rome, Italy	31 July 2009
Games Record	Ryosuke Irie (JPN)	1:55.45	Guangzhou, China	15 November 2010

== Results ==
Legend

- DSQ — Disqualified

=== Heats ===
Rank	Heat	Athlete	Time	Notes
1	2	Xu Jiayu (CHN)	1:58.50	
2	2	Ryosuke Irie (JPN)	1:58.93	
3	2	Im Tae-jeong (KOR)	1:59.23	
4	1	Kosuke Hagino (JPN)	2:00.34	
5	1	Alexandr Tarabrin (KAZ)	2:02.45	
6	2	Lin Shih-chieh (TPE)	2:04.13	
7	1	Ricky Anggawijaya (INA)	2:05.55	
8	2	Stanislav Ossinskiy (KAZ)	2:05.99	
9	2	Trần Duy Khôi (VIE)	2:06.30	
10	2	Lau Shiu Yue (HKG)	2:07.29	
11	1	Daniil Bukin (UZB)	2:08.39	
12	1	Rainer Ng (SIN)	2:09.10	
13	1	P. S. Madhu (IND)	2:10.13	
14	2	Tsung Chao-lin (TPE)	2:12.93	
—	1	Li Guangyuan (CHN)	DSQ	

=== Final ===
Rank	Athlete	Time	Notes
1st place, gold medalist(s)	Ryosuke Irie (JPN)	1:53.26	GR
2nd place, silver medalist(s)	Xu Jiayu (CHN)	1:55.05	
3rd place, bronze medalist(s)	Kosuke Hagino (JPN)	1:56.36	
4	Im Tae-jeong (KOR)	1:58.82	
5	Lin Shih-chieh (TPE)	2:03.02	
6	Alexandr Tarabrin (KAZ)	2:04.54	
7	Ricky Anggawijaya (INA)	2:06.41	
8	Stanislav Ossinskiy (KAZ)	2:06.67	
