= Rafael Fente-Damers =

French Olympic Swimmer

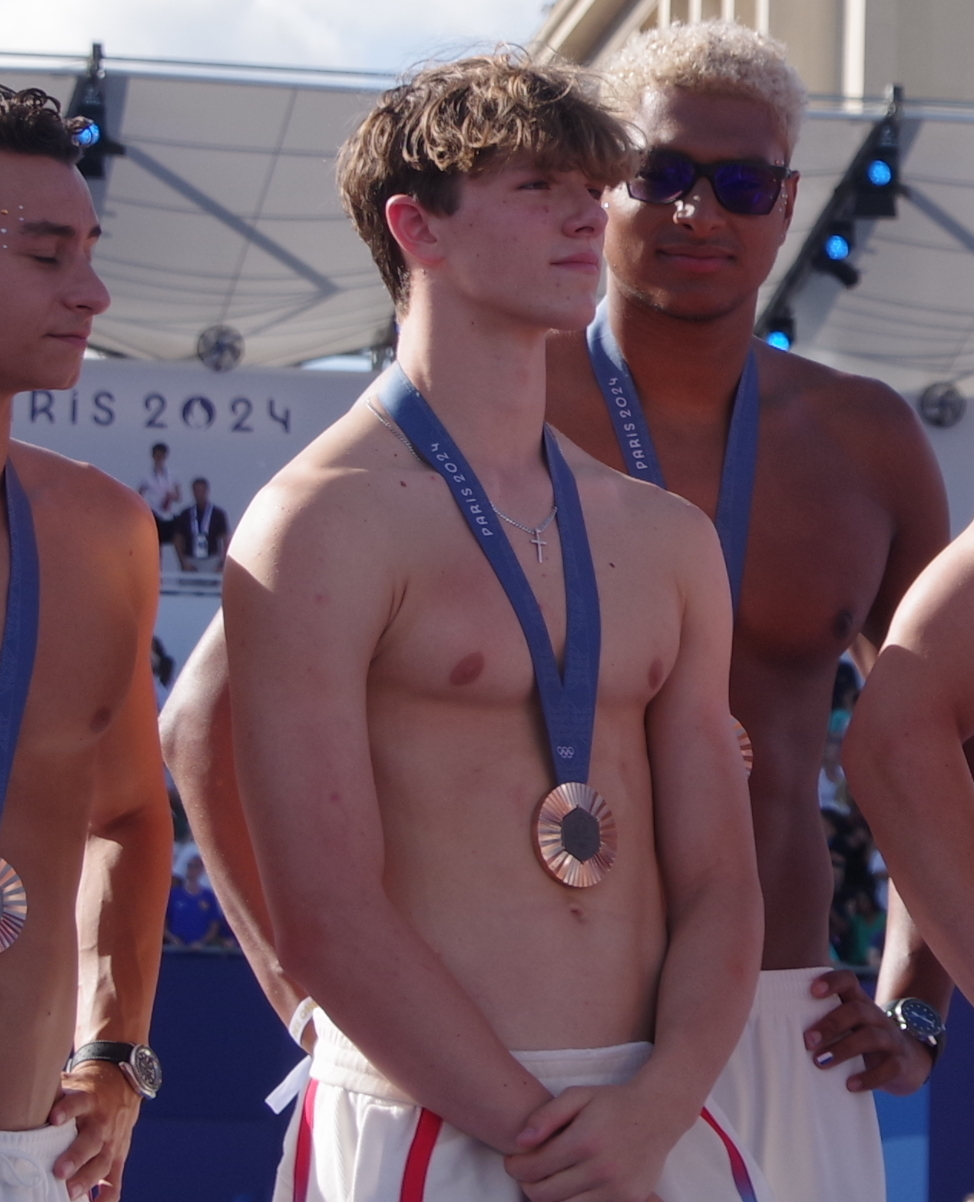

Personal information
- Full name: Rafael Fente-Damers
- National team: France
- Born: 17 October 2006 (age 20) Houston, Texas, U.S.
- Education: SEK Castillo
- Height: 1.90 m (6 ft 3 in)
- Weight: 86 kg (190 lb)
- Spouse: N/A

Sport
- Sport: Swimming
- Strokes: Freestyle
- Club: Guepards swim club and Dauphins D’Annecy
- College team: University of Texas
- Coach: Juan Camus and Vanessa Brouard
Medal record
Men's swimming
Representing France
Olympic Games
Bronze medal – third place	2024 Paris	4×100 m medley relay
World Championships (LC)
Bronze medal – third place	2025 Singapore	4x100 m mixed freestyle

Rafael Fente-Damers (born 17 October 2006) is a French swimmer. He competed at the 2024 Summer Olympics. After swimming a 48.14 in the 100 meter freestyle in French Olympic trials, a time that set a new junior French record held by Yannick Agnel with 48.80, he punched his ticket to Paris in the individual 100 freestyle and the 4x100 freestyle relay and 4x100 meter medley relay.
