= Kodai Nishiono =

Japanese swimmer

Personal information
- Native name: 西小野 皓大
- Nationality: Japanese
- Born: 7 April 2003 (age 23)
- Employers: Shinto Kogyo Co., Ltd.

Sport
- Sport: Swimming
Medal record
Men's swimming
Representing Japan
Asian Games
Gold medal – first place	2026 Aichi–Nagoya	200 m backstroke
World University Games
Silver medal – second place	2021 Chengdu	200 m backstroke

Kodai Nishiono (Japanese: 西小野 皓大, born 7 April 2003) is a Japanese swimmer who specializes in the backstroke. He represents Japan in international competitions and is affiliated with Shinto Kogyo Co., Ltd. He won the silver medal in the men's 200 metre backstroke at the 2023 Summer World University Games in Chengdu, China, and won the gold medal in the same event at the 2026 Asian Games in Aichi-Nagoya, Japan.

== Career ==
Nishiono was born on 7 April 2003 and attended Chukyo University. He competes primarily in the backstroke events and has represented Japan at major international competitions.

At the 2021 Summer World University Games, which were held in Chengdu in 2023, Nishiono won the silver medal in the men's 200 metre backstroke.

At the 2025 World Aquatics Championships in Singapore, Nishiono competed in the men's 200 metre backstroke. He recorded a time of 1:56.04 in the event.

In 2026, Nishiono competed at the Japan Swimming Championships and recorded a personal best of 1:56.04 in the men's 200 metre backstroke at the national level. He was subsequently selected for Japan's swimming team at the 2026 Asian Games.

At the 2026 Asian Games in Aichi-Nagoya, Nishiono won the gold medal in the men's 200 metre backstroke with a time of 1:56.42. South Korea's Lee Ju-ho won silver in 1:56.58, while China's Xu Jiayu took bronze in 1:56.73.

Nishiono also competed in the men's 100 metre backstroke at the 2026 Asian Games, finishing fourth with a time of 54.03 seconds.
