= Swimming at the 2022 Asian Games – Men's 200 metre backstroke =

Men's 200 metre backstroke at the 2022 Asian Games
- Venue: Hangzhou Olympic Expo Aquatics Center
- Date: 29 September 2023
- Competitors: 22 from 16 nations

Medalists
gold medal	Xu Jiayu	China
silver medal	Lee Ju-ho	South Korea
bronze medal	Hidekazu Takehara	Japan

The men's 200 metre backstroke event at the 2022 Asian Games took place on 29 September 2023 at the Hangzhou Olympic Expo Center.

== Schedule ==
All times are China Standard Time (UTC+08:00)

Date	Time	Event
Friday, 29 September 2023	10:48	Heats
Friday, 29 September 2023	19:56	Final

== Records ==
Prior to this competition, the existing world, Asian and Games records were as follows.

World Record	Aaron Peirsol (USA)	1:51.92	Rome, Italy	31 July 2009
Asian Record	Ryosuke Irie (JPN)	1:52.51	Rome, Italy	31 July 2009
Games Record	Ryosuke Irie (JPN)	1:53.26	Incheon, South Korea	25 September 2014

== Results ==
=== Heats ===
Rank	Heat	Athlete	Time	Notes
1	2	Hidekazu Takehara (JPN)	1:59.78	
2	1	Lee Ju-ho (KOR)	1:59.82	
3	3	Xu Jiayu (CHN)	2:00.04	
4	2	Tao Guannan (CHN)	2:00.44	
5	3	Daiki Yanagawa (JPN)	2:01.31	
6	1	Hayden Kwan (HKG)	2:02.58	
7	1	Advait Page (IND)	2:03.01	
8	2	Farrel Armandio Tangkas (INA)	2:03.19	
9	1	Tonnam Kanteemool (THA)	2:03.89	
10	2	Chuang Mu-lun (TPE)	2:04.10	
11	1	Ratthawit Thammananthachote (THA)	2:04.57	
12	3	Zachary Tan (SGP)	2:04.99	
13	2	Zackery Tay (SGP)	2:05.29	
14	3	Trần Hưng Nguyên (VIE)	2:06.81	
15	3	Srihari Nataraj (IND)	2:07.19	
16	2	Hii Puong Wei (MAS)	2:07.55	
17	3	Yazan Al-Bawwab (PLE)	2:08.01	
18	3	Chan Tsz Chiu (HKG)	2:11.81	
19	1	Abdalla El-Ghamry (QAT)	2:13.92	
20	3	Khash-Erdeniin Tselmeg (MGL)	2:17.32	
21	2	Chan Si Chon (MAC)	2:19.51	
22	1	Ali Imaan (MDV)	2:22.88	

=== Final ===
Rank	Athlete	Time	Notes
1st place, gold medalist(s)	Xu Jiayu (CHN)	1:55.37	
2nd place, silver medalist(s)	Lee Ju-ho (KOR)	1:56.54	
3rd place, bronze medalist(s)	Hidekazu Takehara (JPN)	1:57.63	
4	Daiki Yanagawa (JPN)	1:58.37	
5	Tao Guannan (CHN)	1:59.25	
6	Farrel Armandio Tangkas (INA)	2:02.40	
7	Advait Page (IND)	2:02.67	
8	Hayden Kwan (HKG)	2:03.18	
