= Xie Yichen =

Chinese swimmer (born 2010)

Personal information
- Nationality: Chinese
- Born: 1 August 2010 (age 16)

Sport
- Sport: Swimming
- Strokes: Breaststroke
Medal record
Men's swimming
Representing China
Youth Olympic Games
Gold medal – first place	2026 Dakar	50 m breaststroke
Gold medal – first place	2026 Dakar	100 m breaststroke
Silver medal – second place	2026 Dakar	100 m freestyle
Asian Championships
Gold medal – first place	2025 Ahmedabad	200 m medley
Gold medal – first place	2025 Ahmedabad	400 m medley
Gold medal – first place	2025 Ahmedabad	4×100 m freestyle
Gold medal – first place	2025 Ahmedabad	4×200 m freestyle
Gold medal – first place	2025 Ahmedabad	4×100 m mixed freestyle

Xie Yichen (Chinese: 谢以忱; born 1 August 2010) is a Chinese swimmer.

== Career ==
In October 2025, Yichen competed at the 2025 Asian Aquatics Championships and won gold medals in the 200 metre individual medley with a time of 1:59.97 and the 400 metre individual medley with a time of 4:19.34. He also won gold medals in the 4×100 metre freestyle relay, 4×200 metre freestyle relay, and 4×100 metre mixed freestyle relay events. He set an Asian Aquatics Championships record in the 4×100 metre freestyle relay with a time of 3:29.25.

In October 2026, during the Chinese Championships, he set an Asian record and Chinese record in the 4×100 metre medley relay with a time of 3:36.00. The next month he represented China at the 2026 Summer Youth Olympics and won a gold medal in the 100 metre breaststroke with a time of 1:01.03. This was China's first gold medal in swimming of the 2026 Summer Youth Olympics. He then won a gold medal in the 50 metre breaststroke with a time of 28.13 seconds. He also won a silver medal in the 100 metre freestyle with a time of 50.18 seconds.
