= 2025 Asian Aquatics Championships =

Aquatics event in Ahmedabad, India

11th Asian Aquatics Championships
- Host city: Ahmedabad, India
- Date: 28 September – 11 October
- Venue: Veer Savarkar Sports Complex
- Events: 65
- Website: 11thaac2025.com

The 11th Asian Aquatics Championships were held from 28 September to 11 October, 2025 in Ahmedabad, India. The disciplined were swimming, artistic swimming, diving and water polo. This is the first time the tournament was held in India and second time in South Asia.

== Venue ==
Swimming	Veer Savarkar Sports Complex

== Schedule ==
A total of 65 medal events was held across 4 disciplines.

●	Preliminaries	●	Finals

September/October	28	29	30	1	2	3	4	5	6	7	8	9	10	11	Total
Artistic swimming							3	3	3	2					11
Diving	3	3	2	2											10
Swimming	11	11	11	9											42
Water polo							●	●	●	●	●	●	●	2	2
Total	14	14	13	11	0	0	3	3	3	2	0	0	0	2	65
Cumulative Total	14	28	41	52	52	52	55	58	61	63	63	63	63	65	65

== Medalists ==
=== Artistic swimming ===
Men

Event	Gold		Silver		Bronze	
Solo free routine	Viktor Druzin; Kazakhstan	198.7639	Remma Furuuchi; Japan	191.0126	Artur Maidanov; Kazakhstan	174.0101
Solo technical routine	Viktor Druzin; Kazakhstan	228.1708	Eduard Kim; Kazakhstan	223.5584	Remma Furuuchi; Japan	206.8675

Women

Event	Gold		Silver		Bronze	
Solo free routine	Karina Magrupova; Kazakhstan	202.8900	Rachel Thean; Singapore	201.5639	Sabina Makhmudova; Uzbekistan	184.4525
Solo technical routine	Karina Magrupova; Kazakhstan	240.1600	Sabina Makhmudova; Uzbekistan	222.1600	Yasmina Islamova; Kazakhstan	204.0066
Duet free routine	Uzbekistan; Khadicha Agzamova; Sabina Makhmudova	209.9784	Kazakhstan; Dayana Jamanchalova; Yasmin Tuyakova	206.6363	China; Chen Siyi; Jiang Yutong	183.4671
Duet technical routine	Uzbekistan; Khadicha Agzamova; Sabina Makhmudova	240.5808	China; Chen Siyi; Jiang Yutong	233.8316	China; Yang Ziruo; Zhou Yu	217.7400

Mixed

Event	Gold		Silver		Bronze	
Duet free routine	Thailand; Kantinan Adisaisiributr; Supitchaya Songpan	257.6872	China; Weng Kaijie; Yang Surui	242.4933	Kazakhstan; Viktor Druzin; Nargiza Bolatova	241.4613
Duet technical routine	Thailand; Kantinan Adisaisiributr; Pongpimporn Pongsuwan	187.7383	Kazakhstan; Eduard Kim; Karina Magrupova	180.2450	Kazakhstan; Aldiyar Ramazanov; Yasmina Islamova	176.5642

Team

Event	Gold		Silver		Bronze	
Acrobatic routine	Kazakhstan; Nargiza Bolatova; Viktor Druzin; Aigerim Kurmangaliyeva; Karina Magrupova; Xeniya Makarova; Anna Pavletsova; Valeriya Stolbunova; Zhaklin Yakimova	190.1663	Thailand; Jinnipha Adisaisiributr; Kantinan Adisaisiributr; Patrawee Chayawararak; Chantaras Jarupraditlert; Wattikorn Khethirankanok; Pongpimporn Pongsuwan; Supitchaya Songpan; Voranan Toomchay	154.5151	Uzbekistan; Khadicha Agzamova; Samira Agzamova; Safina Djuraeva; Raykhona Ergasheva; Eva Guseva; Sabina Makhmudova; Elina Murudova; Ziyodakhon Toshkhujaeva	141.1051
Free routine	Kazakhstan; Yasmina Islamova; Dayana Jamanchalova; Aigerim Kurmangaliyeva; Xeniya Makarova; Anna Pavletsova; Valeriya Stolbunova; Yasmin Tuyakova; Zhaklin Yakimova	267.0639	Thailand; Kantinan Adisaisiributr; Patrawee Chayawararak; Nannapat Duangprasert; Kanyanatt Kaewvisit; Pongpimporn Pongsuwan; Getsarin Sawangarom; Supitchaya Songpan; Voranan Toomchay	187.3013	Uzbekistan; Khadicha Agzamova; Samira Agzamova; Safina Djuraeva; Raykhona Ergasheva; Eva Guseva; Salvi Mustafaeva; Ziyodakhon Toshkhujaeva; Anna Vashchenko	180.9401
Technical routine	Kazakhstan; Nargiza Bolatova; Dayana Jamanchalova; Aigerim Kurmangaliyeva; Xeniya Makarova; Anna Pavletsova; Valeriya Stolbunova; Yasmin Tuyakova; Zhaklin Yakimova	221.9525	Thailand; Kantinan Adisaisiributr; Patrawee Chayawararak; Nannapat Duangprasert; Kanyanatt Kaewvisit; Pongpimporn Pongsuwan; Getsarin Sawangarom; Supitchaya Songpan; Voranan Toomchay	210.5775	Uzbekistan; Khadicha Agzamova; Samira Agzamova; Safina Djuraeva; Eva Guseva; Sabina Makhmudova; Salvi Mustafaeva; Ziyodakhon Toshkhujaeva; Anna Vashchenko	200.5183

=== Diving ===
Men

Event	Gold		Silver		Bronze	
1 metres springboard	Tai Xiaohu; China	402.95	Muhammad Syafiq Puteh; Malaysia	333.35	Lin Hengnuo; China	330.90
3 metres springboard	Lin Hengnuo; China	409.35	Tai Xiaohu; China	403.85	Vyacheslav Kachanov; Uzbekistan	360.85
Synchronised 3 metres springboard	Lin Hengnuo; Wu Yiyang; China	384.99	Elvish Priesly A Clement; Muhammad Syafiq Puteh; Malaysia	342.30	Igor Myalin; Vyacheslav Kachanov; Uzbekistan	319.17
10 metres platform	Cheng Zilong; China	463.95	Zhang Yunxuan; China	450.35	Igor Myalin; Uzbekistan	378.55
Synchronised 10 metres platform	Cui Zhangyu; Xu Zhanhong; China	381.75	Bertrand Rhodict Lises; Enrique Harold; Malaysia	329.73	Indiver Sairem; Willson Singh Ningthoujam; India	300.66

Women

Event	Gold		Silver		Bronze	
1 metres springboard	Ye Linxi; China	264.35	Li Sijia; China	253.10	Wang Ziyi; Hong Kong	218.90
3 metres springboard	Ye Linxi; China	312.55	Li Sijia; China	282.35	Gladies Lariesa G. Kore; Indonesia	262.80
Synchronised 3 metres springboard	Ye Linxi; Deng Mengyuan; China	282.60	Ong Ker Ying; Nur Muhammad Abrar Raj; Malaysia	233.34	Barbara Chen; Jacqueline Chen; Chinese Taipei	221.20
10 metres platform	Liu Zihan; China	370.25	Wu Xiahan; China	298.75	Nur Muhammad Abrar Raj; Malaysia	240.10
Synchronised 10 metres platform	Wu Xiahan; Liu Zihan; China	317.04	Nur Muhammad Abrar Raj; Nurul Farisya Affendi; Malaysia	235.86	Gladies Lariesa G. Kore; Linar Betiliana; Indonesia	209.58

=== Swimming ===
Men

Event	Gold		Silver		Bronze	
50 metres freestyle	Ali Tamer Hassan; Qatar	22.45 NR	Gleb Kovalenya; Kazakhstan	22.81	Chuang Mu-lun; Chinese Taipei	22.82
100 metres freestyle	Wang Haoyu; China	49.19	Ali Tamer Hassan; Qatar	49.46	Srihari Nataraj; India	49.96
200 metres freestyle	Xu Haibo; China	1:46.83	Srihari Nataraj; India	1:48.47	Hinata Ando; Japan	1:48.73
400 metres freestyle	Xu Haibo; China	3:49.29	Nguyễn Huy Hoàng; Vietnam	3:51.63	Khiew Hoe Yean; Malaysia	3:52.69
800 metres freestyle	Nguyễn Huy Hoàng; Vietnam	7:57.58	Ilya Sibirtsev; Uzbekistan	8:00.37	Xu Haibo; China	8:02.34
1500 metres freestyle	Nguyễn Huy Hoàng; Vietnam	15:15.01	Ilya Sibirtsev; Uzbekistan	15:23.35	Kushagra Rawat; India	15:30.88
50 metres backstroke	Wang Gukailai; China	25.11	Srihari Nataraj; India	25.46	Chuang Mu-lun; Chinese Taipei	25.50
100 metres backstroke	Wang Gukailai; China	54.27	Chuang Mu-lun; Chinese Taipei	54.45 NR	Srihari Nataraj; India	55.23
200 metres backstroke	Wang Gukailai; China	1:59.78	Rui Yoshida; Japan	2:01.66	Rishabh Das; India	2:02.64
50 metres breaststroke	Qin Haiyang; China	26.99 CR	Aibat Myrzamuratov; Kazakhstan	28.04	Mohamed Mahmoud Mohamed; Qatar	28.09
100 metres breaststroke	Qin Haiyang; China	59.07 CR	Phạm Thanh Bảo; Vietnam	1:01.08	Tsui Yik Ki; Hong Kong	1:01.89
200 metres breaststroke	Qin Haiyang; China	2:09.46	Iori Miyazaki; Japan	2:12.47	Phạm Thanh Bảo; Vietnam	2:12.50
50 metres butterfly	Adilbek Mussin; Kazakhstan	23.74	Benedicton R. Beniston; India	23.89 NR	Maxim Skazobtsov; Kazakhstan	23.90
100 metres butterfly	Wang Kuan-hung; Chinese Taipei	52.41	Maxim Skazobtsov; Kazakhstan	52.66	Li Taiyu; China	52.76
200 metres butterfly	Wang Kuan-hung; Chinese Taipei	1:56.63	Ryo Kuratsuka; Japan	1:57.24	Sajan Prakash; India	1:57.90
200 metres individual medley	Xie Yichen; China	1:59.97	Wang Hsing-hao; Chinese Taipei	2:01.05	Trần Hưng Nguyên; Vietnam	2:02.71
400 metres individual medley	Xie Yichen; China	4:19.34	Trần Hưng Nguyên; Vietnam	4:20.30	Shun Tanaka; Japan	4:20.56
4 × 100 metres freestyle relay	Wang Haoyu; Wang Gukailai; Xie Yichen; Xu Haibo; China	3:19.93	Wang Hsing-hao; Fu Kun-ming; Chuang Mu-lun; Wang Kuan-hung; Chinese Taipei	3:20.59	Jashua Thomas Durai; Akash Mani; Benediction R. Beniston; Srihari Nataraj; India	3:21.49
4 × 200 metres freestyle relay	Xu Haibo; Wang Haoyu; Xie Yichen; Qin Haiyang; China	7:21.05	Aneesh Gowda; Sajan Prakash; Shoan Ganguly; Srihari Nataraj; India	7:23.38 NR	Khiew Hoe Yean; Terence Ng Shin Jian; Tan Khai Xin; Lim Yin Chuen; Malaysia	7:23.43
4 × 100 metres medley relay	Wang Gukailai; Qin Haiyang; Li Taiyu; Wang Haoyu; China	3:36.93	Chuang Mu-lun; Wang Hsing-hao; Wang Kuan-hung; Fu Kun-ming; Chinese Taipei	3:39.40	Rishabh Das; Likith Selvaraj Prema; Benediction R. Beniston; Srihari Nataraj; India	3:40.87

Women

Event	Gold		Silver		Bronze	
50 metres freestyle	Luo Mingyu; China	25.53	Chiu Yi-chen; Chinese Taipei	25.57	Li Sum Yiu; Hong Kong	25.64
100 metres freestyle	Luo Mingyu; China	55.63	Li Sum Yiu; Hong Kong	55.92	Nguyễn Thúy Hiền; Vietnam	56.01
200 metres freestyle	Luo Mingyu; China	2:01.31	Võ Thị Mỹ Tiên; Vietnam	2:01.95	Wang Xintong; Hong Kong	2:02.30
400 metres freestyle	Tanimoto Haruno; Japan	4:16.39	Nguyễn Khả Nhi; Vietnam	4:25.50	Bhavya Sachdeva; India	4:26.89
800 metres freestyle	Tanimoto Haruno; Japan	8:47.48	Võ Thị Mỹ Tiên; Vietnam	8:54.43	Gao Jialian Candice; Hong Kong	9:02.82
1500 metres freestyle	Lam Pac Tung Nikita; Hong Kong	17:08.36	Nguyễn Khả Nhi; Vietnam	17:23.60	Thitirat Charoensup; Thailand	17:30.36
50 metres backstroke	Li Jiawei; China	28.13	Sofiya Abubakirova; Kazakhstan	28.90	Misaki Kasahara; Japan	28.96
100 metres backstroke	Li Jiawei; China	1:00.51	Misaki Kasahara; Japan	1:01.60	Mia Millar; Thailand	1:03.56
200 metres backstroke	Misaki Kasahara; Japan	2:12.09	Li Jiawei; China	2:12.13	Mia Millar; Thailand	2:16.51
50 metres breaststroke	Man Wui Kiu; Hong Kong	32.04	Cheung Wing Yi Claire; Hong Kong	32.26	Chiu Yi-chen; Chinese Taipei	32.29
100 metres breaststroke	Man Wui Kiu; Hong Kong	1:09.12	Wang Yijing; China	1:09.79	Koharu Nakazawa; Japan	1:10.14
200 metres breaststroke	Mana Ishikawa; Japan	2:26.36	Koharu Nakazawa; Japan	2:27.51	Gao Jialian Candice; Hong Kong	2:29.61
50 metres butterfly	Gong Zhenqi; China	26.62	Sofiya Abubakirova; Kazakhstan	26.80	Sofia Spodarenko; Kazakhstan	26.94
100 metres butterfly	Gong Zhenqi; China	59.17	Liu Pei-yin; Chinese Taipei	1:00.07	Sofia Spodarenko; Kazakhstan	1:01.14
200 metres butterfly	Gong Zhenqi; China	2:09.97	Manami Miyamoto; Japan	2:11.32	Kamonchanok Kwanmuang; Thailand	2:12.83
200 metres individual medley	Mana Ishikawa; Japan	2:12.00	Zhou Yanjun; China	2:15.30	Võ Thị Mỹ Tiên; Vietnam	2:15.96
400 metres individual medley	Zhou Yanjun; China	4:44.88	Koharu Nakazawa; Japan	4:47.40	Võ Thị Mỹ Tiên; Vietnam	4:49.81
4 × 100 metres freestyle relay	Luo Mingyu; Li Jiawei; Zhou Yanjun; Gong Zhenqi; China	3:43.72	Li Sum Yiu; Wang Xintong; Man Wui Kiu; Ng Lai Wa; Hong Kong	3:48.40	Jinjutha Pholjamjumrus; Kamonchanok Kwanmuang; Kamonluck Tungnapakorn; Mia Miller; Thailand	3:54.21
4 × 200 metres freestyle relay	Luo Mingyu; Wang Yijing; Zhou Yanjun; Gong Zhenqi; China	8:14.79	Wang Xintong; Lam Pac Tung Nikita; Li Sum Yiu; Man Wui Kiu; Hong Kong	8:16.93	Mia Miller; Thitirat Charoensup; Jinjutha Pholjamjumrus; Kamonchanok Kwanmuang; Thailand	8:32.17
4 × 100 metres medley relay	Li Jiawei; Wang Yijing; Gong Zhenqi; Luo Mingyu; China	4:06.16	Misaki Kasahara; Mana Ishikawa; Manami Miyamoto; Minami Yui; Japan	4:08.54	Chan Tsz Yu Ashley; Gao Jialian Candice; Man Wui Kiu; Li Sum Yiu; Hong Kong	4:12.79

Mixed

Event	Gold		Silver		Bronze	
4 × 100 metres freestyle relay	Wang Haoyu; Xie Yichen; Luo Mingyu; Gong Zhenqi; China	3:29.25	Chuang Mu-lun; Liu Pei-yin; Chiu Yi-Chen; Wang Kwan-Hung; Chinese Taipei	3:34.68	Adilbek Mussin; Galymzhan Balabek; Sofia Spodarenko; Sofiya Abubakirova; Kazakhstan	3:35.36
4 × 100 metres medley relay	Wang Gukailai; Qin Haiyang; Gong Zhenqi; Luo Mingyu; China	3:49.43	Misaki Kasahara; Mana Ishikawa; Ryo Kuratsuka; Hinata Ando; Japan	3:53.13	Trần Hưng Nguyên; Phạm Thanh Bảo; Võ Thị Mỹ Tiên; Nguyễn Thúy Hiền; Vietnam	3:55.97 NR

=== Water polo ===
Event	Gold	Silver	Bronze
Men's team	China; Chen Haotian; Liu Zhilong; Chu Chenghao; Yu Lijun; Zhang Jinpeng; Wang Beiyi; Zhu Beile; Lu Yi; Chen Yimin; Yang Shanglin; Cai Yuhao; Shen Dingsong; Yao Zhenghan; Zhu Gengmin; Qin Zhou	Iran; Hamed Karimi; Omid Aghaei Karim; Alireza Mehri; Farbod Behzad Sabouri; Ashkan Iranpour; Mersad Adham; Arman Shams; Mehdi Yazdankhan; Amirreza Jalilpour; Amin Ghavidel; Mahdi Barzegari; Erfan Sadrnia; Amirhossein Amirian; Mehrab Golestanirad; Farbod Borghei	Kazakhstan; Temirlan Balfanbayev; Eduard Tsoy; Yulian Verdesh; Adil Baltabekuly; Maxim Lamayev; Alexey Shmider; Murat Shakenov; Igor Nedokentsev; Ruslan Akhemtov; Mikhail Ruday; Aldiyar Akimbay; Sultan Shonzhigitov; Daniil Matolinets; Almat Madimar; Mstislav Bobrovskiy
Women's team	China; Du Xinyue; Li Peiyang; Yan Jing; Li Linyun; Wang Xuan; Sun Yating; Shi Jingjiarong; Zhang Qishuo; Guo Chenghong; Zhu Yajing; Wang Xin; Han Wen; Yang Jun; Liu Yan; Li Jianyu	Japan; Noa Kanja; Shoka Fukuda; Maho Kobayashi; Riko Bando; Kanade Shibata; Karin Yamada; Nina Lowrey; Sakura Sobajima; Seira Eguchi; Yumeka Sanda; Kaho Shironoshita; Kanna Motomura	Kazakhstan; Alexandra Zharkimbayeva; Darya Pochinok; Yuliya Druzhinina; Viktoriya Kaplun; Valeriya Anossova; Madina Rakhmanova; Anna Novikova; Olga Vorontsova; Milena Nabiyeva; Yelizaveta Rudneva; Anastassiya Mirshina; Anastassiya Tsoy; Mariya Martynenko; Alina Ozkaya; Anelya Altybassarova

== Results ==
=== Water polo ===
==== Men ====
A: CHN - IRI - HKG - UZB - KUW (Withdraw) / B: KAZ - JPN - SIN - THA - IND

==== Women ====
A: JPN - SIN - UZB - IND / B: KAZ - CHN - THA - HKG

== Medal table ==
=== Total ===
* Host nation (India)

Rank	Nation	Gold	Silver	Bronze	Total
1	China	40	10	4	54
2	Kazakhstan	8	7	8	23
3	Japan	5	12	4	21
4	Hong Kong	3	4	7	14
5	Vietnam	2	7	6	15
6	Chinese Taipei	2	7	4	13
7	Thailand	2	3	8	13
7	Uzbekistan	2	3	8	13
9	Qatar	1	1	1	3
10	Malaysia	0	5	3	8
11	India*	0	4	9	13
12	Singapore	0	1	1	2
13	Iran	0	1	0	1
14	Indonesia	0	0	2	2
Totals (14 entries)		65	65	65	195

=== Artistic swimming ===
* Host nation (India)

Rank	Nation	Gold	Silver	Bronze	Total
1	Kazakhstan	7	2	2	11
2	Thailand	2	3	2	7
3	Uzbekistan	2	1	5	8
4	China	0	2	1	3
5	Japan	0	2	0	2
6	Singapore	0	1	1	2
Totals (6 entries)		11	11	11	33

=== Diving ===
* Host nation (India)

Rank	Nation	Gold	Silver	Bronze	Total
1	China	10	5	1	16
2	Malaysia	0	5	1	6
3	Uzbekistan	0	0	3	3
4	Indonesia	0	0	2	2
5	Chinese Taipei	0	0	1	1
5	Hong Kong	0	0	1	1
5	India*	0	0	1	1
Totals (7 entries)		10	10	10	30

=== Swimming ===
* Host nation (India)

Rank	Nation	Gold	Silver	Bronze	Total
1	China	28	3	2	33
2	Japan	5	9	4	18
3	Hong Kong	3	4	6	13
4	Vietnam	2	7	6	15
5	Chinese Taipei	2	7	3	12
6	Kazakhstan	1	5	4	10
7	Qatar	1	1	1	3
8	India*	0	4	8	12
9	Uzbekistan	0	2	0	2
10	Thailand	0	0	6	6
11	Malaysia	0	0	2	2
Totals (11 entries)		42	42	42	126

=== Water polo ===
* Host nation (India)

Rank	Nation	Gold	Silver	Bronze	Total
1	China	2	0	0	2
2	Iran	0	1	0	1
2	Japan	0	1	0	1
4	Kazakhstan	0	0	2	2
Totals (4 entries)		2	2	2	6
