= Kang Ji-seok =

South Korean swimmer (born 1994)

Personal information
- Nationality: South Korea
- Born: 24 August 1994 (age 31) Iksan, South Korea
- Height: 188 cm (6 ft 2 in)
- Weight: 68 kg (150 lb)

Sport
- Sport: Swimming
Medal record
Representing South Korea
Men's swimming
Asian Games
Bronze medal – third place	2018 Jakarta	50 m backstroke
Bronze medal – third place	2018 Jakarta	4×100 m mixed medley

Kang Ji-seok (born 24 August 1994) is a South Korean male swimmer. He is also a South Korean national record holder in 50m backstroke event.

He claimed a bronze medal in the men's 50m backstroke event at the 2018 Asian Games representing South Korea.
