= Hidekazu Takehara =

Japanese swimmer

Personal information
- Nationality: Japanese
- Born: 27 April 2004 (age 22) Fukuoka Prefecture, Japan
- Education: Toyo University
- Height: 172 cm (5 ft 8 in)

Sport
- Sport: Swimming
- Club: Haruka Swimming School Akama
Medal record
Men's swimming
Representing Japan
Asian Games
Silver medal – second place	2022 Hangzhou	4×100 m mixed medley
Silver medal – second place	2026 Aichi–Nagoya	100 m backstroke
Silver medal – second place	2026 Aichi–Nagoya	4×100 m medley
Silver medal – second place	2026 Aichi–Nagoya	4×100 m mixed medley
Bronze medal – third place	2022 Hangzhou	200 m backstroke

Hidekazu Takehara (Japanese: 竹原 秀一; born 27 April 2004) is a Japanese swimmer who specializes in the backstroke. He represented Japan at the 2024 Summer Olympics and has won multiple medals at the Asian Games, including three silver medals at the 2026 Asian Games.

== Career ==
Takehara was born in Fukuoka Prefecture and attended Higashi Fukuoka High School before studying at Toyo University. He competes for Toyo University and Haruka Swimming School Akama.

Takehara established himself as one of Japan's leading backstroke swimmers in the early 2020s. At the 2022 Asian Games, he won the bronze medal in the men's 200 m backstroke and a silver medal as part of Japan's mixed 4 × 100 m medley relay team.

At the 2023 World Aquatics Championships in Fukuoka, Takehara competed in the men's 200 m backstroke and advanced to the semifinals. He finished outside the final qualifying positions.

Takehara represented Japan at the 2024 Summer Olympics in Paris. He competed in the men's 200 m backstroke, advancing to the semifinals and finishing 15th overall.

In 2025, Takehara won the men's 200 m backstroke at the Japan Swimming Championships and finished second in the 100 m backstroke. He later competed at the 2025 World Aquatics Championships in Singapore, where he finished 19th in the men's 200 m backstroke.

At the 2026 Japan Swimming Championships, which also served as the selection meet for the 2026 Asian Games, Takehara won both the men's 100 m and 200 m backstroke titles. His performances secured his selection for Japan's Asian Games team.

At the 2026 Asian Games in Aichi-Nagoya, Takehara competed in the men's 50 m, 100 m and 200 m backstroke events and in Japan's medley relays.

Takehara won the silver medal in the men's 100 m backstroke, finishing in 53.93 seconds behind China's Xu Jiayu. South Korea's Lee Ju-ho won bronze in 53.94 seconds, only 0.01 seconds behind Takehara.

In the men's 200 m backstroke, Takehara finished fifth. He also won silver medals as a member of Japan's men's 4 × 100 m medley relay and mixed 4 × 100 m medley relay teams.
