= Lee Ju-ho (swimmer) =

South Korean swimmer (born 1995)

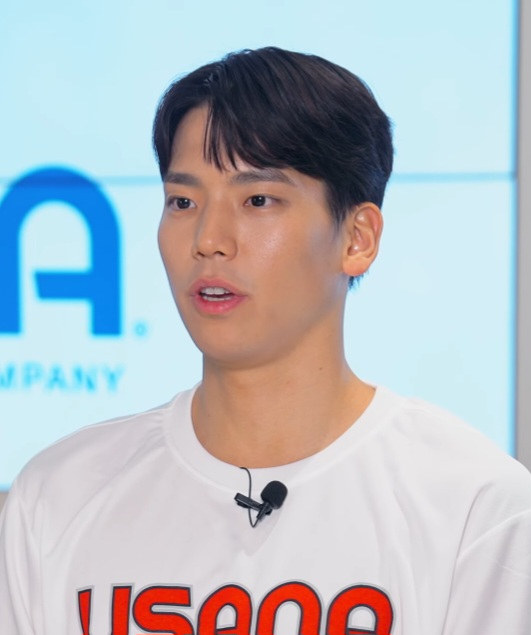

Personal information
- Nationality: South Korean
- Born: 23 January 1995 (age 31) Seoul, South Korea
- Height: 1.85 m (6 ft 1 in)
- Weight: 79 kg (174 lb)

Sport
- Sport: Swimming
- Event: Backstroke
- Club: Seogwipo City Hall
Medal record
Men's swimming
Representing South Korea
Asian Games
Silver medal – second place	2022 Hangzhou	4×100 m medley
Silver medal – second place	2022 Hangzhou	200 m backstroke
Silver medal – second place	2026 Aichi–Nagoya	200 m backstroke
Bronze medal – third place	2018 Jakarta	100 m backstroke
Bronze medal – third place	2018 Jakarta	4×100 m mixed medley
Bronze medal – third place	2022 Hangzhou	100 m backstroke
Bronze medal – third place	2022 Hangzhou	4×100 m mixed medley
Bronze medal – third place	2026 Aichi–Nagoya	100 m backstroke
Bronze medal – third place	2026 Aichi–Nagoya	4×100 m medley

Korean name
- Hangul: 이주호
- RR: I Juho
- MR: I Chuho

Lee Ju-ho (Korean: 이주호; born 23 January 1995) is a South Korean swimmer. He competed in the men's 100 metre backstroke event at the 2018 Asian Games, winning the bronze medal. He qualified to represent South Korea at the 2020 Summer Olympics.

== Career ==
In July 2021, he represented South Korea at the 2020 Summer Olympics held in Tokyo, Japan. He competed in the 100m backstroke and 200m backstroke. In the 100m backstroke heats, he did not advance to compete in the semifinal. In the 200m backstroke heats event, he completed at rank 2, allowing him to advance to compete in the semifinal. In the 200m backstroke semifinal event, he completed at rank 11, missing out to compete in the final.
