= Asian Aquatics Championships =

Major aquatics event in Asia

- Status: Active
- Genre: Continental sporting event
- Date: Two weeks (usually mid-year)
- Frequency: quadrennial
- Location: Various host cities
- Years active: 45 years
- Inaugurated: 1980
- Major events: Swimming, Diving, Artistic Swimming, Open Water Swimming, High Diving
- Organiser: Asia Aquatics
- Website: www.asiaaquatics.net
- 2025 Asian Aquatics Championships

The Asian Aquatics Championships are a major aquatics event, held every four years among the athletes from Asian countries. It is conducted under the governance of the Asia Aquatics, the governing body of aquatics in Asia.

== Editions ==
Year	Edition	City	Country	Dates
1980	1	Dhaka	Bangladesh	4 June– 12 June
1984	2	Seoul	South Korea	28 May – 5 June
1988	3	Guangzhou	China	2–12 April
1992	4	Hiroshima	Japan	
1996	5	Bangkok	Thailand	12–15 April
2000	6	Busan	South Korea	28 March – 2 April
2006	7	Singapore	Singapore	5–10 March
2009	8	Foshan	China	25–28 November
2012	9	Dubai	United Arab Emirates	15–25 November
2016	10	Tokyo	Japan	14–20 November
2025	11	Ahmedabad	India	28 September – 11 October

== Championships records ==
All records were set in finals unless noted otherwise. All times are swum in a long-course (50m) pool.

=== Men ===
Event	Time		Name	Nationality	Date	Meet	Location	Ref
50m freestyle	22.03	=	Katsumi Nakamura	Japan	20 November 2016	2016 Championships	Tokyo, Japan	
50m freestyle	22.03	=	Yu Hexin	China	20 November 2016	2016 Championships	Tokyo, Japan	
100m freestyle	48.57		Park Tae-hwan	South Korea	19 November 2016	2016 Championships	Tokyo, Japan	
200m freestyle	1:45.16		Park Tae-hwan	South Korea	17 November 2016	2016 Championships	Tokyo, Japan	
400m freestyle	3:42.49		Sun Yang	China	16 November 2012	2012 Championships	Dubai, United Arab Emirates	
800m freestyle	7:53.25	†	Sun Yang	China	17 November 2012	2012 Championships	Dubai, United Arab Emirates	
1500m freestyle	14:44.10		Sun Yang	China	17 November 2012	2012 Championships	Dubai, United Arab Emirates	
50m backstroke	24.65		Xu Jiayu	China	19 November 2016	2016 Championships	Tokyo, Japan	
100m backstroke	52.75	r	Xu Jiayu	China	17 November 2016	2016 Championships	Tokyo, Japan	
200m backstroke	1:55.19		Xu Jiayu	China	18 November 2016	2016 Championships	Tokyo, Japan	
50m breaststroke	26.99		Qin Haiyang	China	29 September 2025	2025 Championships	Ahmedabad, India	
100m breaststroke	59.07		Qin Haiyang	China	30 September 2025	2025 Championships	Ahmedabad, India	
200m breaststroke	2:08.19		Ippei Watanabe	Japan	19 November 2016	2016 Championships	Tokyo, Japan	
50m butterfly	23.66		Masayuki Kishida	Japan	18 November 2016	2016 Championships	Tokyo, Japan	
100m butterfly	52.00		Li Zhuhao	China	17 November 2016	2016 Championships	Tokyo, Japan	
200m butterfly	1:54.53		Masato Sakai	Japan	19 November 2016	2016 Championships	Tokyo, Japan	
200m individual medley	1:56.66		Wang Shun	China	20 November 2016	2016 Championships	Tokyo, Japan	
400m individual medley	4:10.17		Daiya Seto	Japan	17 November 2016	2016 Championships	Tokyo, Japan	
4×100m freestyle relay	3:16.37		Lin Yongqing (49.23); He Jianbin (49.38); Liu Zhaochen (49.15); Yu Hexin (48.61)	China	20 November 2016	2016 Championships	Tokyo, Japan	
4×200m freestyle relay	7:13.14		Katsuhiro Matsumoto (1:47.67); Tsubasa Amai (1:48.52); Daiya Seto (1:47.65); Fuyu Yoshida (1:49.30)	Japan	18 November 2016	2016 Championships	Tokyo, Japan	
4×100m medley relay	3:33.43		Xu Jiayu (52.75); Li Xiang (59.93); Li Zhuhao (52.09); Yu Hexin (48.66)	China	17 November 2016	2016 Championships	Tokyo, Japan	

Legend: # – Record awaiting ratification by AASF; WR – World record; AS – Asian record; e – equalled existing record;
Records not set in finals: h – heat; sf – semifinal; r – relay 1st leg; rh – relay heat 1st leg; b – B final; † – en route to final mark; so – swim-off; tt – time trial

=== Women ===
Event	Time	Name	Nationality	Date	Meet	Location	Ref
50 m freestyle	24.90	Rikako Ikee	Japan	18 November 2016	2016 Championships	Tokyo, Japan	
100 m freestyle	53.44	Zhu Menghui	China	17 November 2016	2016 Championships	Tokyo, Japan	
200 m freestyle	1:56.71	Shen Duo	China	18 November 2016	2016 Championships	Tokyo, Japan	
400 m freestyle	4:05.75	Xu Danlu	China	17 November 2012	2012 Championships	Dubai, United Arab Emirates	
800 m freestyle	8:22.24	Xu Danlu	China	18 November 2012	2012 Championships	Dubai, United Arab Emirates	
1500 m freestyle	16:36.46	Yu Rui	China	6 March 2006	2006 Championships	Singapore, Singapore	
50m backstroke	27.38	Gao Chang	China	25 November 2009	2009 Championships	Foshan, China	
100m backstroke	59.70	Fu Yuanhui	China	18 November 2016	2016 Championships	Tokyo, Japan	
200m backstroke	2:08.98	Chen Jie	China	20 November 2016	2016 Championships	Tokyo, Japan	
50m breaststroke	31.28	Satomi Suzuki	Japan	20 November 2016	2016 Championships	Tokyo, Japan	
100m breaststroke	1:07.77	Chen Huijia	China	27 November 2009	2009 Championships	Foshan, China	
200m breaststroke	2:22.74	Reona Aoki	Japan	18 November 2016	2016 Championships	Tokyo, Japan	
50m butterfly	25.74	Rikako Ikee	Japan	18 November 2016	2016 Championships	Tokyo, Japan	
100m butterfly	57.12	Jiao Liuyang	China	27 November 2009	2009 Championships	Foshan, China	
200m butterfly	2:06.23	Liu Zige	China	25 November 2009	2009 Championships	Foshan, China	
200m individual medley	2:11.46	Yui Ohashi	Japan	20 November 2016	2016 Championships	Tokyo, Japan	
400m individual medley	4:37.71	Nguyễn Thị Ánh Viên	Vietnam	17 November 2016	2016 Championships	Tokyo, Japan	
4×100m freestyle relay	3:37.10	Sun Meichen (54.90); Tang Yi (54.78); Shen Duo (54.16); Zhu Menghui (53.26)	China	19 November 2016	2016 Championships	Tokyo, Japan	
4×200m freestyle relay	7:54.98	Shen Duo (1:59.37); Zhang Yuhan (1:58.34); Ai Yanhan (1:58.12); Wang Shijia (1:59.15)	China	17 November 2016	2016 Championships	Tokyo, Japan	
4×100m medley relay	3:57.97	Emi Moronuki (1:00.98); Misaki Sekiguchi (1:06.42); Rikako Ikee (56.18); Tomomi Aoki (54.39)	Japan	20 November 2016	2016 Championships	Tokyo, Japan	

Legend: # – Record awaiting ratification by AASF; WR – World record; AS – Asian record; e – equalled existing record;
Records not set in finals: h – heat; sf – semifinal; r – relay 1st leg; rh – relay heat 1st leg; b – B final; † – en route to final mark; so – swim-off; tt – time trial

=== Mixed relay ===
Event	Time	Name	Club	Date	Meet	Location	Ref
4×100 m freestyle relay	3:29.25	Wang Haoyu (49.24); Xie Yichen (49.99); Xie Yichen (54.77); Gong Zhenqi (55.25)	China	30 September 2025	2025 Championships	Ahmedabad, India	
4×100 m medley relay	3:49.43	Wang Gukailai (56.14); Qin Haiyang (59.43); Gong Zhenqi (58.74); Luo Mingyu (55.12)	China	1 October 2025	2025 Championships	Ahmedabad, India	

Legend: # – Record awaiting ratification by AASF; WR – World record; AS – Asian record; e – equalled existing record;
Records not set in finals: h – heat; sf – semifinal; r – relay 1st leg; rh – relay heat 1st leg; b – B final; † – en route to final mark; so – swim-off; tt – time trial

== See also ==
- Swimming at the Asian Games
- Diving at the Asian Games
- Synchronized swimming at the Asian Games
- Water polo at the Asian Games
- Asian Water Polo Championship
