= Merdan Ataýew =

Turkmenistani swimmer

Personal information
- Born: 8 May 1995 (age 31) Ashgabat, Turkmenistan
- Height: 196 cm (6 ft 5 in)
- Weight: 80 kg (176 lb)

Sport
- Sport: Swimming
- Strokes: Backstroke

Merdan Ataýew (born 8 May 1995) is a Turkmenistani swimmer. Ataýew competed for Turkmenistan at the 2016 Summer Olympics and the 2020 Summer Olympics. International Master of Sports of Turkmenistan (2021).

== Early life ==
Merdan Ataýew was born on 8 May 1995 in Ashgabat. He is a student of the Turkmen State Institute of Physical Culture and Sports. He lives and trains in Ashgabat; his coach as of 2021 was Segeý Ýepifanow.

== Career ==
He competed in the men's 100 metre backstroke event at the 2016 Summer Olympics. He placed 33rd in the heats with a time of 56.34 seconds and did not qualify for the semifinals. He was the flagbearer for Turkmenistan during the opening ceremony.

In 2021, Merdan Ataýew qualified to represent Turkmenistan at the 2020 Summer Olympics in Tokyo, Japan, where he went on to compete in the 100 metre backstroke, and the 200 metre breaststroke events.

At the 2020 Summer Olympics, Merdan Ataýew was chosen the flag bearer for Turkmenistan again.

== Major results ==
Year	Competition	Venue	Position	Event	Notes
Representing Turkmenistan
2014	Asian Games	Incheon, South Korea	9th (h)	50 m backstroke	26.31
2014	Asian Games	Incheon, South Korea	7th	100 m backstroke	56.63
2015	World Championships	Kazan, Russia	45th (h)	50 m backstroke	26.64
2015	World Championships	Kazan, Russia	49th (h)	100 m butterfly	57.57
2016	Olympic Games	Rio de Janeiro, Brazil	33rd (h)	100 m backstroke	56.34
2016	Asian Championships	Tokyo, Japan	8th	50 m backstroke	26.00
2016	Asian Championships	Tokyo, Japan	8th	100 m backstroke	55.94
2017	Islamic Solidarity Games	Baku, Azerbaijan	2nd	50 m backstroke	25.82
2017	Islamic Solidarity Games	Baku, Azerbaijan	2nd	100 m backstroke	55.44
2018	Asian Games	Jakarta, Indonesia	8th	50 m backstroke	25.88
2018	Asian Games	Jakarta, Indonesia	10th (h)	100 m backstroke	56.20
2021	Olympic Games	Tokyo, Japan	34th (h)	100 m backstroke	55.24

Olympic Games
Preceded by Serdar Hudayberdiyev	Flagbearer for Turkmenistan; Rio de Janeiro 2016	Succeeded by Gülbadam Babamuratowa and Merdan Ataýew
