= Rishabh Das =

Indian swimmer (born 2007)

Personal information
- Full name: Rishabh Das
- National team: India
- Born: 22 July 2007 (age 19)

Sport
- Sport: Swimming
- Strokes: Backstroke,Medley
- Club: Father Agnel Sports Center
- Coach: Rutuja Udeshi and Gokul Kamath
Medal record
Men's swimming
Representing India
Asian Championships
Silver medal – second place	2025 Ahmedabad	4x100 m medley relay
Bronze medal – third place	2025 Ahmedabad	200 m Backstroke

Rishabh Das (born 22 July 2007) is an Indian swimmer from Maharashtra, who specialises in 100m backstroke, and 4 x 100 medley events. He represented India at the 2026 Asian Games held in September 2026 and qualified for the final of the 100m backstroke. He finished sixth with a time of 54.77.

== Early life ==
Das is from Navi Mumbai. He did his schooling at Fr Agnels School in Vashi, where he was spotted by coach Gokul Kamath during a Talent Search programme in 2012. He did his class 12 at Fr Agnel Junior College. His first major event was the Under 10 Nationals at Pune in 2017.

== Career ==
In June 2026, he won a gold medal in the Men's 100m and 200m backstroke events in the 79th Senior National Aquatics Championships 2026. In February 2024, he set his personal best in the Men's 50m butterfly event at the 1th Asian Age Group Championships 2024. In November 2024,, he broke the National record in the 50m backstroke at the Junior Nationals held in Bhubaneswar, Odisha.

In July 2023, he won a gold in the Indian championships. In November 2023, he won three silver medals and a bronze at the National Games in Goa. He bagged silver medals in the 50 meter, 100 meter and 200 meter backstroke events while the bronze came in the 4x100m freestyle team event. In September 2026, he won gold medal in the sub-junior and junior Nationals at Bhubaneswar.

On 8 March 2026, he set a new National record in men’s 200m backstroke at the 2026 NSW State Open Championships in Sydney Olympic Park Aquatic Centre, Sydney. He clocked 2:00.14s for the record and claimed a bronze, erasing his own record of 2:00.69s set in 2025 at the Senior National championships in Bhubaneswar.
