= Jamal Chavoshifar =

Iranian swimmer

Personal information
- Full name: Jamal Chavoshifar جمال چاوشی‌فر
- National team: Iran
- Born: 19 August 1990 (age 36) Isfahan, Iran
- Height: 1.90 m (6 ft 3 in)
- Weight: 85 kg (187 lb)

Sport
- Sport: Swimming
- Strokes: Backstroke
- Club: Foulad-e Mobarakeh Sepahan (2009-2011); Naft-e Omidiyeh (2012); Mowj-ha-ye Abi-ye Mashhad (2013); Naft-e Tehran (2014-present)

Jamal Chavoshifar (Persian: جمال چاوشی‌فر; also Romanized as "Jamāl Chāvoshifar", IPA: ʤæ'mɒːl ʧɒːvoʃiː'fæɾ, born 1990) is an Iranian swimmer who specialized in the backstroke.

== Swimming career ==
Born on 19 August 1990 into a family of sportsmen and encouraged by his father, Jamal Chavoshifar engaged in swimming as a child. At first he chose the breaststroke and won the first medal of his life in one of its styles. But he gradually inclined to the butterfly stroke, and finally began his specialty, that is the backstroke, at the age of sixteen.

In his first abroad competition, Jamal managed to break the 50m and 100m backstroke records of Iran at the Malaysian Competitions in 2008, when he was eighteen.

Chavoshifar holds the Iranian records of 50, 100, and 200 m events of the backstroke in short course pools, as well as the records of 50 and 100 m events of the same style in long course pools. He has been continuously improving his records during his championship period.

=== Historic records ===
- Chavoshifar is the first Iranian swimmer to swim the 100m backstroke in less than a minute.
- Chavoshifar is the first Iranian swimmer to swim the 50m backstroke in less than 26 seconds.
- Chavoshifar is the first Iranian swimmer to gain the entrance record of the backstroke for WorldSkills Kazan 2019 in Russia.

=== Team records ===
In addition to the above-mentioned records, Chavoshifar holds the records of the three events of long course relay 4 × 100 m, short course relay 4×50m, and short course relay 4 × 100 m.

=== Best results ===
Event	Time	Venue	date
50 m backstroke (Short course)	25.40 (NR)	Doha, Qatar; World Championships	5 December 2014
100 m backstroke (Short course)	55.03 (NR)	Doha, Qatar World Championships	3 December 2014
200 m backstroke (Short course)	2:03:39 (NR)	Doha, Qatar; World Championships	7 December 2014

== See also ==
- List of Iranian records in swimming
