= Xu Jiayu =

Chinese swimmer (born 1995)

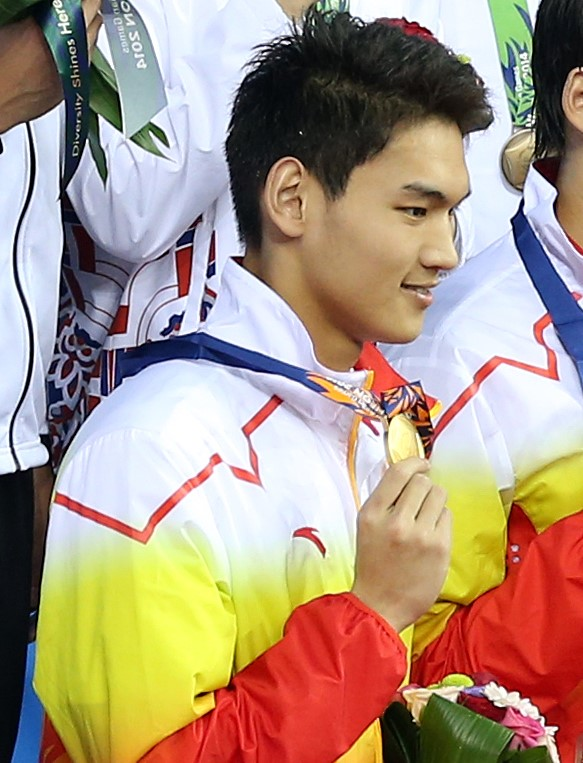
- Xu at the 2014 Asian Games

Personal information
- Full name: 徐嘉余; Xu Jiayu
- Nationality: Chinese
- Born: 19 August 1995 (age 31) Wenzhou, Zhejiang, China
- Height: 1.87 m (6 ft 2 in)
- Weight: 78 kg (172 lb)

Sport
- Sport: Swimming
- Strokes: Backstroke
- College team: Shanghai Jiao Tong University
Medal record
Men's swimming
Representing China
International aquatics competitions
| Event | 1st | 2nd | 3rd |
|---|---|---|---|
| Olympic Games | 1 | 4 | 0 |
| World Championships (LC) | 3 | 2 | 2 |
| World Championships (SC) | 0 | 1 | 2 |
| Asian Games | 15 | 2 | 2 |
| Asian Swimming Championships | 5 | 1 | 1 |
| Total | 24 | 10 | 7 |
Olympic Games
| Gold medal – first place | 2024 Paris | 4×100 m medley |
| Silver medal – second place | 2016 Rio de Janeiro | 100 m backstroke |
| Silver medal – second place | 2020 Tokyo | 4×100 m mixed medley |
| Silver medal – second place | 2024 Paris | 100 m backstroke |
| Silver medal – second place | 2024 Paris | 4×100 m mixed medley |
World Championships (LC)
| Gold medal – first place | 2017 Budapest | 100 m backstroke |
| Gold medal – first place | 2019 Gwangju | 100 m backstroke |
| Gold medal – first place | 2023 Fukuoka | 4×100 m mixed medley |
| Silver medal – second place | 2023 Fukuoka | 4×100 m medley |
| Silver medal – second place | 2025 Singapore | 4×100 m mixed medley |
| Bronze medal – third place | 2017 Budapest | 4×100 m mixed medley |
| Bronze medal – third place | 2023 Fukuoka | 50 m backstroke |
World Championships (SC)
| Silver medal – second place | 2018 Hangzhou | 100 m backstroke |
| Bronze medal – third place | 2016 Windsor | 100 m backstroke |
| Bronze medal – third place | 2018 Hangzhou | 4×200 m freestyle |
Asian Games
| Gold medal – first place | 2014 Incheon | 4×100 m medley |
| Gold medal – first place | 2018 Jakarta | 50 m backstroke |
| Gold medal – first place | 2018 Jakarta | 100 m backstroke |
| Gold medal – first place | 2018 Jakarta | 200 m backstroke |
| Gold medal – first place | 2018 Jakarta | 4×100 m medley |
| Gold medal – first place | 2018 Jakarta | 4×100 m mixed medley |
| Gold medal – first place | 2022 Hangzhou | 50 m backstroke |
| Gold medal – first place | 2022 Hangzhou | 100 m backstroke |
| Gold medal – first place | 2022 Hangzhou | 200 m backstroke |
| Gold medal – first place | 2022 Hangzhou | 4×100 m medley |
| Gold medal – first place | 2022 Hangzhou | 4×100 m mixed medley |
| Gold medal – first place | 2026 Aichi-Nagoya | 50 m backstroke |
| Gold medal – first place | 2026 Aichi-Nagoya | 100 m backstroke |
| Gold medal – first place | 2026 Aichi-Nagoya | 4×100 m medley |
| Gold medal – first place | 2026 Aichi-Nagoya | 4×100 m mixed medley |
| Silver medal – second place | 2014 Incheon | 100 m backstroke |
| Silver medal – second place | 2014 Incheon | 200 m backstroke |
| Bronze medal – third place | 2014 Incheon | 50 m backstroke |
| Bronze medal – third place | 2026 Aichi-Nagoya | 200 m backstroke |

Xu Jiayu (Chinese: 徐嘉余; pinyin: Xú Jiāyú; born 19 August 1995) is a Chinese competitive swimmer who specializes in the backstroke. He is the Olympic Silver medalist (2016 Rio de Janeiro and 2024 Paris) and twice consecutive world champion (2017 Budapest and 2019 Gwangju) in the 100 meters backstroke.

== Early and personal life ==
Xu was born in Wenzhou, Zhejiang. His mother Yu Zhenzhen (余珍珍) is a former swimmer who specialized in the butterfly. He has an elder sister Xu Si (徐思).

Xu started swimming at the age of 4 under his mother's guidance.

Xu is an alumnus of Shanghai Jiao Tong University.

== Career ==
=== 2014–2016 ===
In May 2014, Xu competed at the Chinese National Championships in Qingdao. He went 52.34 in the 100 m backstroke, breaking the Chinese record of 53.22 set by Cheng Feiyi in 2012. He then competed in the 50 m backstroke, going 24.58 to break the Chinese record of 24.75 set by Sun Xiaolei in 2013. He later won the 200 m backstroke in a Chinese record time of 1:55.11.

In September 2014, Xu competed at the Asian Games in Incheon. He won the silver medal in the 100 m backstroke in a time of 52.81. He then won a bronze medal in the 50 m backstroke in a time of 25.24. He won his second silver medal of the competition in the 200 m backstroke, in a time of 1:55.05. Xu concluded the competition with the 4 × 100 m medley relay; China won the gold medal in a games record time of 3:31.37.

Xu competed at the 2015 World Championships in Kazan. He finished fourth in the 100 m backstroke in a time of 52.89. He then swam the backstroke leg of the mixed 4 × 100 m medley relay, splitting 52.74. China finished fourth in a time of 3:44.65. Xu then competed in the 200 m backstroke, finishing sixth in a time of 1:55.20. He competed in the 50 m backstroke, finishing twenty-ninth in the heats in a time of 25.71. His final event was the men's 4 × 100 m medley relay, where he split 53.44 on the backstroke leg. China finished eleventh in a time of 3:35.21.

In April 2016, Xu competed at the Chinese National Championships in Foshan. He went 1:54.79 in the 200 m backstroke, a new Chinese record.

In August 2016, Xu competed at the 2016 Olympics in Rio de Janeiro and won the silver medal in the 100 m backstroke in a national record time of 52.31. He finished fourth in the 200 m backstroke in a time of 1:55.16. Xu's final event was the 4 × 100 m medley relay. He split 53.21 on the backstroke leg, however, China was later disqualified due to an early relay exchange by Li Zhuhao.

=== 2017 ===
In April 2017, Xu competed at the Chinese National Championships in Qingdao. He went 51.86 in the 100 m backstroke, breaking the Asian record of 52.24 set by Japan's Ryosuke Irie in 2009. Xu's time was 0.01 slower than the world record set by the US' Ryan Murphy in 2016.

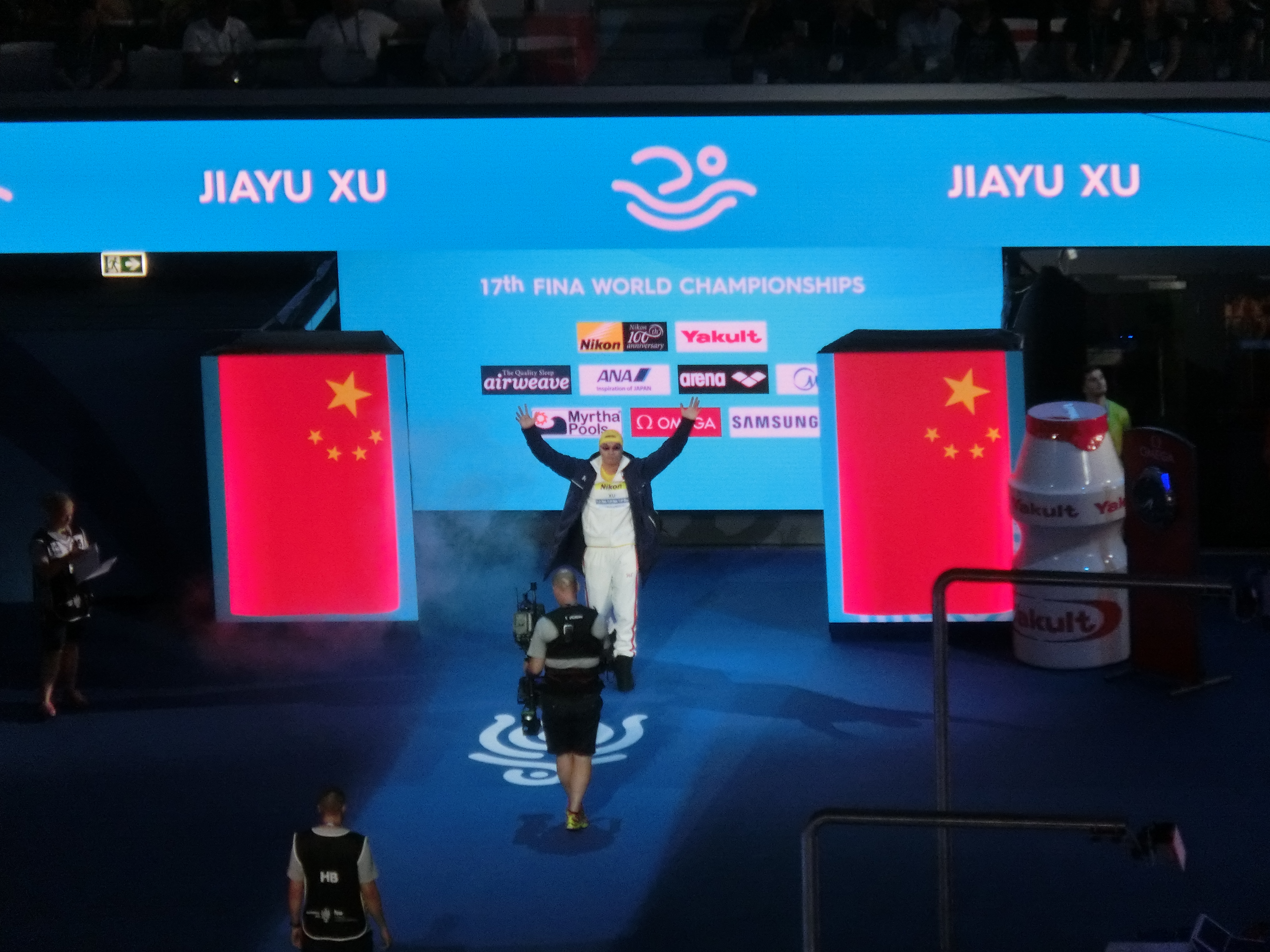
Xu during the 2017 World Aquatics Championships

In July 2017, Xu competed at the World Championships in Budapest. He won the gold medal in the 100 m backstroke in a time of 52.44. He then swam the backstroke leg of the mixed 4 × 100 m medley relay, splitting 52.37. China set an Asian record of 3:41.25, dead-heating with Canada for the bronze medal. Japan broke China's record in 2018. Xu then swam the 200 m backstroke, finishing fifth in a time of 1:55.26. On the final day of competition, he swam in two events. He finished fifth in the 50 m backstroke in a time of 24.74. He then swam in the men's 4 × 100 m medley relay, splitting 52.89 on the backstroke leg. China finished sixth in a time of 3:31.65.

=== 2018–2019 ===
In August 2018, Xu competed at the Asian Games in Jakarta. He won the gold medal in the 100 m backstroke in a time of 52.34, equaling Irie's games record from 2014. Xu then won the gold medal in the 50 m backstroke in a time of 24.75. He then competed in the mixed 4 × 100 m medley relay, splitting 52.30 on the backstroke leg. China won the gold medal in a time of 3:40.45, breaking Japan's Asian record of 3:40.98. Xu then competed in the 200 m backstroke, winning the gold medal in a Chinese record time of 1:53.99. He concluded the competition with the men's 4 × 100 m medley relay, where he split 52.60 on the backstroke leg. China won the gold medal in a time of 3:29.99, beating Japan by 0.04 seconds. China broke the Asian record of 3:30.19 set by Japan in 2017.

Xu competed at the 2018 FINA World Cup. In Tokyo, he went 48.88 in the short course 100 m backstroke, breaking the world record of 48.90 set by Russia's Kliment Kolesnikov in 2017. In Beijing, he went 22.70 in the short course 50 m backstroke, setting a new Chinese record in the process.

Xu competed at the 2019 World Championships in Gwangju. He went 52.17 in the semifinals of the 100 m backstroke, breaking the championship record of 52.19 set by the US' Aaron Peirsol in 2009. In the final, Xu won the gold medal in a time of 52.43. He went 1:57.15 to finish fifth in the 200 m backstroke heats, before withdrawing from the semifinals to focus on the 4 × 200 m freestyle relay. In the relay, Xu split 1:48.13 on the third leg, helping China finish sixth in a time of 7:04.74. On the final day, Xu finished sixth in the 50 m backstroke in a time of 24.64. He then swam in the men's 4 × 100 m medley relay, splitting 52.97 on the backstroke leg. China finished seventh in a time of 3:31.61.

=== 2020–2022 ===
In October 2020, Xu competed at the Chinese National Championships in Qingdao. He swam the backstroke leg of the mixed 4 × 100 m medley relay, splitting 52.45. China finished in an overall time of 3:38.41, breaking the world record of 3:38.56 set by the US in 2017.

In July–August 2021, Xu competed at the Olympics in Tokyo. He finished fifth in the 100 m backstroke in a time of 52.51. He went 1:57.76 to finish fifteenth in the 200 m backstroke heats before withdrawing from the semifinals. He then competed in the mixed 4 × 100 m medley relay, an event which made its Olympic debut that year. He split 52.56 on the backstroke leg, helping China win the silver medal in an overall time of 3:38.86. China's world record was broken by the Great Britain. Xu's final event was the men's 4 × 100 m medley relay. He split 52.77 on the backstroke leg, however, China was later disqualified. The nation's Asian record was broken by Japan. Following the Olympics, Xu gave his medal to the widow of his former coach, who had died in 2020.

In June 2022, Xu competed at the World Championships in Budapest. He went 53.49 to finish tenth in the 100 m backstroke. His next event was the mixed 4 × 100 m medley relay. He split 52.90 on the backstroke leg; China finished sixth in a time of 3:43.55. He then competed in the 50 m backstroke, recording a time of 24.90 to finish twelfth. He concluded the competition by swimming the backstroke leg of the men's 4 × 100 m medley relay in the heats, before being replaced in the final. China eventually finished eighth.

=== 2023 ===
In July 2023, Xu competed at the World Championships in Fukuoka. In the 100 m backstroke, he went 52.64 to finish fourth. He then competed in the mixed 4 × 100 m medley relay, splitting 52.42 on the backstroke leg. China won the gold medal in a time of 3:38.57. On the final day, Xu competed in two events. First was the 50 m backstroke, where he won the bronze medal in a time of 24.50. He then swam the backstroke leg of the men's 4 × 100 m medley relay, splitting 53.39. China won the silver medal in 3:29.00, breaking Japan's Asian record of 3:29.91 from 2021.

In September 2023, Xu competed at the Asian Games in Hangzhou. He won the gold medal in the 100 m backstroke in a games record time of 52.23. He then won the gold medal in the 50 m backstroke in a Chinese record time of 24.38. His next event was the men's 4 × 100 m medley relay. He broke the games record in the 100 m backstroke, splitting 52.05 on the first leg. China won the gold medal in an Asian record time of 3:27.01, 0.23 slower than the US' world record from 2021. He then competed in the mixed 4 × 100 m medley relay, splitting 51.91 on the backstroke leg. China won the gold medal in an Asian record time of 3:37.73. Xu's final event was the 200 m backstroke, in which he won the gold medal in a time of 1:55.37.

=== 2024–2026 ===
Xu competed at the 2024 Olympics in Paris. He won the silver medal in the 100 m backstroke in a time of 52.32. He was entered in the 200 m backstroke, but he did not start. He then swam the backstroke leg of the mixed 4 × 100 m medley relay, splitting 52.13. China won the silver medal in an Asian record time of 3:37.55, finishing 0.12 behind the US. Xu's final event was the men's 4 × 100 m medley relay. He split 52.37 on the backstroke leg to give China an early lead. China eventually won the gold medal in a time of 3:27.46, resulting in the US losing the event for the first time in Olympic history.

Xu competed at the World Championships in Singapore. He competed in the 100 m backstroke, recording a time of 53.14 to finish eleventh. He then swam the backstroke leg of the mixed 4 × 100 m medley relay, splitting 53.23. China won the silver medal in a time of 3:39.99. His final event was the 50 m backstroke, where he finished twenty-sixth in a time of 25.08.

In June 2026, Xu competed at the Chinese National Championships in Hangzhou. He went 23.92 in the 50 m backstroke, breaking the Asian record of 24.24 set by Japan's Junya Koga in 2009.

== Career best times ==
=== Long course (50-meter pool) ===
| Event | Time | Meet | Date | Note(s) |
|---|---|---|---|---|
| 50 m backstroke | 23.92 | 2026 Chinese Championships | 17 June 2026 | AR |
| 100 m backstroke | 51.86 | 2017 Chinese Championships | 12 April 2017 | AR |
| 200 m backstroke | 1:53.99 | 2018 Asian Games | 23 August 2018 | NR |
| 4 × 200 m freestyle relay | 7:04.74 | 2019 World Aquatics Championships | 26 July 2019 | NR |
| 4 × 100 m medley relay | 3:27.01 | 2022 Asian Games | 26 September 2023 | AR |
| 4 × 100 m mixed medley relay | 3:38.41 | 2020 Chinese Championships | 1 October 2020 | WR |

=== Short course (25-meter pool) ===
| Event | Time | Meet | Date | Note(s) |
|---|---|---|---|---|
| 50 m backstroke | 22.70 | 2018 FINA Swimming World Cup | 3 November 2018 | AR |
| 100 m backstroke | 48.88 | 2018 FINA Swimming World Cup | 11 November 2018 | WR |
| 200 m backstroke | 1:48.32 | 2018 FINA Swimming World Cup | 9 November 2018 | NR |
| 4 × 200 m freestyle relay | 6:47.53 | 2018 FINA World Swimming Championships | 14 December 2018 | AR |
| 4×50m medley relay | 1:33.95 | 2016 FINA World Swimming Championships | 10 December 2016 | NR |
| 4 × 100 m medley relay | 3:26.87 | 2016 FINA World Swimming Championships | 11 December 2016 | NR |
| 4×50m mixed medley relay | 1:38.69 | 2018 FINA Swimming World Cup | 4 November 2018 | NR |

Key: WR = World Record, AR = Asian Record, NR = National Record

| Preceded by United States | Mixed 4 x 100-meter medley relay world record-holder 1 October 2020 – 31 July 2021 | Succeeded by Great Britain |

| Preceded by Kliment Kolesnikov | Men's 100-meter backstroke world record-holder (short course); 11 November 2018 – 21 November 2020 | Succeeded by Kliment Kolesnikov |
