= Triathlon at the 2026 Asian Games =

- Venue: Gamagōri City Triathlon Venue
- Location: Gamagōri, Aichi Prefecture, Japan
- Dates: 20–21 September 2026
- Competitors: 73 from 23 nations

Triathlon at the 2026 Asian Games was held between 20 and 21 September 2026 in Gamagōri, Aichi Prefecture.

The Gamagōri Chamber of Commerce and Industry and the Gamagōri Citizen's Hall are the main hubs of the triathlon venue. The swim course is at a waterfront near Takeshima Island. The Takeshima Aquarium and Gamagōri Green Park serves as landmarks for the cyclying course.

The Gamagori Chamber of Commerce and Industry building is a main hub of the triathlon venue. The swim course is the waterfront behind the compound.

== Schedule ==
The schedule was as follows:

F	Final

Event↓/Date →	20th Sun	21st Mon
Men's individual	F	
Women's individual	F	
Mixed relay		F

== Medal summary ==
=== Medal table ===
* Host nation (Japan)

Rank	Nation	Gold	Silver	Bronze	Total
1	China	2	2	0	4
2	Japan*	1	1	1	3
3	Hong Kong	0	0	1	1
3	Kazakhstan	0	0	1	1
Totals (4 entries)		3	3	3	9

=== Medalists ===
Event	Gold	Silver	Bronze
Men's	Takumi Hojo; Japan	Zhang Xirui; China	Arlan Zhanabay; Kazakhstan
Women's	Lin Xinyu; China	Huang Anqi; China	Manami Hayashi; Japan
Mixed relay	China; Lin Xinyu; Li Mingxu; Huang Anqi; Zhang Xirui	Japan; Mako Hiraizumi; Kazushi Jozuka; Manami Hayashi; Takumi Hojo	Hong Kong; Cade Wright; Oscar Coggins; Bailee Brown; Robin Elg

== Participating nations ==
The following nations entered triathletes for the 2026 Asian Games.

- Afghanistan (1)
- Bahrain (1)
- Cambodia (1)
- China (5)
- Hong Kong (5)
- Indonesia (5)
- Iran (1)
- Jordan (1)
- Japan (5) (host)
- Kazakhstan (5)
- Kyrgyzstan (4)
- South Korea (4)
- Lebanon (1)
- Macau (4)
- Mongolia (3)
- Pakistan (5)
- Philippines (5)
- Palestine (1)
- Singapore (5)
- Thailand (6)
- Chinese Taipei (4)
- United Arab Emirates (1)
- Uzbekistan (4)
