= Fencing at the 2026 Asian Games – Women's team foil =

Women's team foil at the 2026 Asian Games
- Venue: Aichi Sky Expo Hall F
- Date: 26 September 2026
- Competitors: 34 from 9 nations

Medalists
gold medal	Japan; Sera Azuma, Komaki Kikuchi, Sumire Tsuji, Yuka Ueno
silver medal	South Korea; Lee Se-joo, Mo Byeol-i, Park Ji-hee, Sim So-eun
bronze medal	China; Fu Yingying, Huang Qianqian, Song Yue, Zhang Siqi
bronze medal	Hong Kong; Daphne Chan, Valerie Cheng, Janelle Leung, Sophia Wu

The women's team foil competition at the 2026 Asian Games in Nagoya was held on 26 September 2026 at the Aichi Sky Expo Hall F. Host nation Japan defeated South Korea 29–28 in the final, winning the gold medal by a single touch. China and Hong Kong shared the bronze medals.

== Schedule ==
All times are Japan Standard Time (UTC+09:00)

Date	Time	Event
Saturday, 26 September 2026	9:30	Table of 16
Saturday, 26 September 2026	11:30	Quarterfinals
Saturday, 26 September 2026	14:00	Semifinals
Saturday, 26 September 2026	17:20	Gold medal match

== Seeding ==
The teams were seeded taking into account the results achieved by competitors representing each team in the individual event.

Rank	Team	Fencer		Total
Rank	Team	1	2	Total
1	Japan (JPN)	2	5	7
2	South Korea (KOR)	1	8	9
3	China (CHN)	5	10	15
4	Singapore (SGP)	3	21	24
5	Hong Kong (HKG)	11	15	26
6	Kazakhstan (KAZ)	16	23	39
7	Macau (MAC)	18	22	40
8	India (IND)	19	24	43
9	Indonesia (INA)	27	28	55

== Results ==
Table of 16
9	Indonesia	24
8	India	45

Quarterfinals
1	Japan	45
8	India	14
5	Hong Kong	45
4	Singapore	35
3	China	40
6	Kazakhstan	36
7	Macau	32
2	South Korea	45

Semifinals
1	Japan	45
5	Hong Kong	27
3	China	35
2	South Korea	43

Gold medal match
1	Japan	29
2	South Korea	28

== Final standing ==
Rank	Team
1st place, gold medalist(s)	Japan (JPN); Sera Azuma; Komaki Kikuchi; Sumire Tsuji; Yuka Ueno
2nd place, silver medalist(s)	South Korea (KOR); Lee Se-joo; Mo Byeol-i; Park Ji-hee; Sim So-eun
3rd place, bronze medalist(s)	China (CHN); Fu Yingying; Huang Qianqian; Song Yue; Zhang Siqi
3rd place, bronze medalist(s)	Hong Kong (HKG); Daphne Chan; Valerie Cheng; Janelle Leung; Sophia Wu
5	Singapore (SGP); Amita Berthier; Kemei Cheung; Stephanie Tingyi Lee; Maxine Wong
6	Kazakhstan (KAZ); Sofiya Aktayeva; Alyona Gnoyeva; Alina Iskanderova
7	Macau (MAC); Chan Hong Cheng; Ku Hio Lam; Lam Chi Mei; Lo I Nga Elia
8	India (IND); Kanupriya Chawla; Mina Devi Naorem; Joys Ashitha Stalinraj; Sonia Devi Waikhom
9	Indonesia (INA); Fadilah Aprilia Budifirdausi; Riley Faith Kumalaputra; Leoda Lundy Winona; Putri Yanti
