= Swimming at the 2026 Asian Games – Men's 100 metre freestyle =

Men's 100 metre freestyle at the 2026 Asian Games
- Venue: Tokyo Aquatics Centre
- Date: 20 September 2026
- Competitors: 43 from 27 nations

Medalists
gold medal	Pan Zhanle	China
silver medal	Kim Young-beom	South Korea
bronze medal	Hwang Sun-woo	South Korea

The men's 100 metre freestyle event at the 2026 Asian Games took place on 20 September 2026 at the Tokyo Aquatics Centre. Pan Zhanle of China, won the gold medal with a time of 47.61 seconds, successfully defending the title he won at the 2022 Asian Games.

== Schedule ==
All times are Japan Standard Time (UTC+09:00)

Date	Time	Event
Sunday, 20 September 2026	10:40	Heats
Sunday, 20 September 2026	17:53	Final

== Records ==
Prior to this competition, the existing world, Asian and Games records were as follows.

World Record	Pan Zhanle (CHN)	46.40	Paris, France	31 July 2024
Asian Record	Pan Zhanle (CHN)	46.40	Paris, France	31 July 2024
Games Record	Pan Zhanle (CHN)	46.97	Hangzhou, China	24 September 2023

== Results ==
=== Heats ===
Rank	Heat	Athlete	Time	Notes
1	5	Pan Zhanle (CHN)	48.07	Q
2	5	Hwang Sun-woo (KOR)	48.13	Q
3	4	Kim Young-beom (KOR)	48.34	Q
4	3	Tatsuya Murasa (JPN)	48.57	Q
5	4	Ali Hassan (QAT)	48.65	Q, NR
6	4	Zhang Zhanshuo (CHN)	48.66	Q
7	3	Katsuhiro Matsumoto (JPN)	48.85	Q
8	5	Pongpanod Trithan (THA)	49.03	Q, NR
9	5	Mikkel Lee (SGP)	49.38	Q
10	4	Jonathan Tan (SGP)	49.81	Swim-off
11	4	Emad Zaben (KSA)	49.81	Swim-off
12	5	Benedicton Beniston (IND)	50.25	Reserve
13	4	Maxim Klimenko (KAZ)	50.26	
14	4	Arvin Singh (MAS)	50.31	
15	5	Lin Yi-cheng (TPE)	50.35	
16	3	Adilbek Mussin (KAZ)	50.42	
17	3	Kevin Prayitno (INA)	50.46	
18	5	Zaid Alsarraj (KSA)	50.49	
19	3	Samuel Septionus (INA)	50.52	
20	1	Logan Noguchi (PHI)	50.61	
21	3	Yin Chuen Lim (MAS)	50.65	
22	3	Enkhtamir Batbayar (MGL)	50.67	
23	5	Akash Mani (IND)	50.85	
24	3	Chun Lim Wan (HKG)	51.20	
25	5	Surasit Thongdeang (THA)	51.23	
26	4	Mohammad Ghasemi (IRI)	51.86	
27	3	Disandu Niriella (SRI)	52.02	
28	3	Aviv Pradhan (NEP)	52.74	
29	4	Ian Ho (HKG)	52.76	
30	5	Hamad Alshehhi (UAE)	52.84	
31	1	Jonathan Shaheen (PLE)	53.31	
32	2	Ninjin Enkhbaatar (MGL)	53.41	
33	4	Abdulla Jamal (BRN)	53.55	
34	1	Alan Muhin (TKM)	53.69	
35	2	Hamza Asif (PAK)	53.97	
36	2	Ervin Shrestha (NEP)	54.03	
37	2	Wa Chan Hou (MAC)	54.06	
38	2	Ardasher Gadoev (TJK)	54.18	
39	2	Mahmoud Abugharbia (PLE)	54.48	
40	2	Tong Fok Cheng (MAC)	54.93	
41	2	Ryuto Saysanavongphet (LAO)	59.72	
42	2	Yusuf Nasser (YEM)	1:00.14	
43	2	Karimdzhon Kurbanov (TJK)	1:00.69	

=== Final ===
Rank	Athlete	Time	Notes
1st place, gold medalist(s)	Pan Zhanle (CHN)	47.61	
2nd place, silver medalist(s)	Kim Young-beom (KOR)	47.65	
3rd place, bronze medalist(s)	Hwang Sun-woo (KOR)	47.79	
4	Zhang Zhanshuo (CHN)	48.23	
5	Tatsuya Murasa (JPN)	48.40	
6	Katsuhiro Matsumoto (JPN)	48.50	
7	Ali Hassan (QAT)	48.63	NR
8	Pongpanod Trithan (THA)	49.10	
9	Jonathan Tan (SGP)	50.21	
10	Mikkel Lee (SGP)	52.06	
