= Macau at the 2026 Asian Games =

- IOC code: MAC
- NOC: Sports and Olympic Committee of Macau, China

in Aichi Prefecture and Nagoya, Japan 19 September 2026 – 4 October 2026
- Competitors: 85 (39 men & 46 women) in 16 sports
- Medals Ranked 25th: Gold 1 Silver 4 Bronze 1 Total 6

Asian Games appearances (overview)
- 1990; 1994; 1998; 2002; 2006; 2010; 2014; 2018; 2022; 2026

Macau is currently competes at the 2026 Asian Games in Aichi Prefecture and Nagoya, Japan from September 19 to October 4, 2026. The territory's delegation consists of 86 competitors.

== Medal summary ==
Medal	Name	Sport	Event	Date
Gold	Kuong Chi Hin	Wushu	Men's changquan	20 September
Silver	Song Chi Kuan	Wushu	Men's changquan	20 September
Silver	Sou Cho Man	Wushu	Women's changquan	21 September
Silver	Fong Man Hou	Karate	Men's individual kata	21 September
Silver	Cheang Pei Lok; Fong Man Hou; Kuok Kin Hang	Karate	Men's team kata	23 September
Bronze	Fong Man Wai	Karate	Women's kumite 50 kg	23 September

Medals by sport
Sport	1st place, gold medalist(s)	2nd place, silver medalist(s)	3rd place, bronze medalist(s)	Total
Wushu	1	2	0	3
Karate	0	2	1	3
Total	1	4	1	6

Medals by gender
Gender	1st place, gold medalist(s)	2nd place, silver medalist(s)	3rd place, bronze medalist(s)	Total
Male	1	3	0	4
Female	0	1	1	2
Total	1	4	1	6

Medals by date
Date	1st place, gold medalist(s)	2nd place, silver medalist(s)	3rd place, bronze medalist(s)	Total
20 September	1	1	0	2
21 September	0	2	0	2
23 September	0	1	1	2
Total	1	4	1	6

== Competitors ==
The following is the list of number of competitors in the Games.

Sport	Men	Women	Total
Athletics	4	1	5
Badminton	4	2	6
Basketball	0	4	4
Boxing	1	0	1
Cycling	3	2	5
Diving	0	2	2
Fencing	4	4	8
Golf	3	1	4
Karate	5	5	10
Squash	0	4	4
Swimming	5	5	10
Table tennis	3	3	6
Taekwondo	1	1	2
Triathlon	2	2	4
Volleyball	0	2	2
Wushu	6	4	10
Total	39	41	80

== Athletics ==
Key

- Note–Ranks given for track events are within the athlete's heat only
- Q = Qualified for the next round
- q = Qualified for the next round as a fastest loser or, in field events, by position without achieving the qualifying target
- NR = National record
- N/A = Round not applicable for the event
- Bye = Athlete not required to compete in round

Track events
Men

Athlete	Event	Heat		Semifinal		Final	
Athlete	Event	Result	Rank	Result	Rank	Result	Rank
Chan Kin Wa	100 m	10.72	5	Did not advance			
Leong Lok Io	100 m	10.65	5	Did not advance			
Leong Lok Io	200 m	21.91	4 Q	21.76	7	Did not advance	

Women

Athlete	Event	Heat		Semifinal		Final	
Athlete	Event	Result	Rank	Result	Rank	Result	Rank
Loi Im Lan	100 m	12.21	5	Did not advance			

Field events

Athlete	Event	Final	
Athlete	Event	Distance	Position
O Kai Leong	Men's long jump	6.88	14

== Badminton ==
Men

Athlete	Event	Round of 64	Round of 32	Round of 16	Quarterfinals	Semifinals	Final	
Athlete	Event	Opposition Score	Opposition Score	Opposition Score	Opposition Score	Opposition Score	Opposition Score	Rank
Pui Chi Chon	Singles	Khanal (NEP); L 0–2	Did not advance					
Pui Pang	Singles	Bye	Vitidsarn (THA); L 0–2	Did not advance				
Pui Chi Chon; Pui Pang	Doubles	—N/a	Cheung / Deng (HKG); L 0–2	Did not advance				
Leong Iok Chong; Vong Kok Weng	Doubles	—N/a	Carnando / Marthin (INA); L 0–2	Did not advance				
Leong Iok Chong; Pui Chi Chon; Pui Pang; Vong Kok Weng	Team	—N/a		Thailand; L 0–3	Did not advance			

Women

Athlete	Event	Round of 64	Round of 32	Round of 16	Quarterfinals	Semifinals	Final	
Athlete	Event	Opposition Score	Opposition Score	Opposition Score	Opposition Score	Opposition Score	Opposition Score	Rank
Pui Chi Wa	Singles	Bye	Zhumabek (KAZ); W 2–0	Yamaguchi (JPN); L 0–2	Did not advance			
Ng Weng Chi; Pui Chi Wa	Doubles	—N/a	Yeung N T / Yeung P L (HKG); L 0–2	Did not advance				

Mixed

Athlete	Event	Round of 32	Round of 16	Quarterfinals	Semifinals	Final	
Athlete	Event	Opposition Score	Opposition Score	Opposition Score	Opposition Score	Opposition Score	Rank
Leong Iok Chong; Ng Weng Chi	Doubles	Chan Y C / Ng T Y (HKG); L 0–2	Did not advance				
Pui Chi Chon; Pui Chi Wa	Doubles	Trần / Phạm (VIE); L 0–2	Did not advance				

== Basketball ==
=== 3×3 basketball ===
Summary

Team	Event	Group stage				Play-ins	Quarterfinal	Semifinal	Final / BM	
Team	Event	Opposition Score	Opposition Score	Opposition Score	Rank	Opposition Score	Opposition Score	Opposition Score	Opposition Score	Rank
Macau women's	Women's tournament	Malaysia; L 9–15	Mongolia; L 3–14	Philippines; L 4–21	4	Did not advance				

==== Women's tournament ====
Team roster

- Lin Weng Ha (8)
- Chang Cho Wan (22)
- Cheng U Man
- Tai Un Kei

Group play

Pos	Team	Pld	W	L	PF	PA	PD	Pts	Qualification
1	Philippines	3	3	0	55	28	+27	6	Quarterfinals
2	Malaysia	3	2	1	43	31	+12	5	Play-ins
3	Mongolia	3	1	2	38	43	−5	4	Play-ins
4	Macau	3	0	3	16	50	−34	3	

Source: 2026 Asian Games

22 September
12:25

Report

Malaysia	14–3	Macau
Pts: Three players 4		Pts: Chang 2

Kinjō-futō Station Square, Nagoya
Referees: Chen Kuan-i (TPE), Su Yu-yen (TPE)

22 September
14:05

Report

Philippines	21–4	Macau
Pts: Pasilang 8		Pts: Tai 3

Kinjō-futō Station Square, Nagoya
Referees: Chen Kuan-i (TPE), Neoh Yuen (MAS)

23 September
17:40

Report

Mongolia	15–9	Macau
Pts: Batjargal 7		Pts: Cheng 4

Kinjō-futō Station Square, Nagoya
Referees: Rina Nozaki (JPN), Liu Chee (MAS)

== Boxing ==
Athlete	Event	Round of 32	Round of 16	Quarterfinals	Semifinals	Final	
Athlete	Event	Opposition Result	Opposition Result	Opposition Result	Opposition Result	Opposition Result	Rank
Alvin John Reyes Salinas	60 kg	Magar (NEP); L 0–5	Did not advance				

== Cycling ==
=== Road ===
Athlete	Event	Time	Rank
Cheang Sing Hei	Men's road race	DNF	—
Lao Long San	Men's road race	DNF	—
Kam Chin Pok	Men's road race	4:27:21	14
Kam Chin Pok	Men's time trial	45:25.36	11
Au Hoi Ian	Women's road race	DNF	—
Au Hoi Ian	Women's time trial	44:53.19	14
Chan Chi Ian	Women's road race	OTL	—

=== Track ===
Omnium

Athlete	Event	Scratch race		Tempo race		Elimination race		Points race		Total	
Athlete	Event	Points	Rank	Points	Rank	Points	Rank	Points	Rank	Points	Rank
Lao Long San	Men's omnium	16	13	16	13	20	11	DNF	13	DNF	13
Au Hou Ian	Women's omnium	20	11	–18	10	20	11	–20	10	2	10

Madison

Athlete	Event	Points	Laps	Rank
Cheang Sing Hei; Lao Long San	Men's madison	DNF	–40	=9

== Diving ==
Athlete	Event	Preliminary		Final	
Athlete	Event	Points	Rank	Points	Rank
Pou Sin Lam	Women's 10 m platform	DNS	—	Did not advance	
Pou Sin Lam; Zhao U Hang	Women's synchronized 3 m springboard	—N/a		166.05	7
Pou Sin Lam; Zhao U Hang	Women's synchronized 10 m platform	—N/a		208.56	5

== Fencing ==
Men

Athlete	Event	Round of 64	Round of 32	Round of 16	Quarterfinal	Semifinal	Final / BM	
Athlete	Event	Opposition Score	Opposition Score	Opposition Score	Opposition Score	Opposition Score	Opposition Score	Rank
Cheong Chong Kio	Foil	–	–	–	–	–	–	
Lam Pak Kio	Foil	–	–	–	–	–	–	
Cheong Chong Kio; Lam Pak Kio; Leong Chit Sheong; Wu Chong Him	Team foil	—N/a		–	–	–	–	

Women

Athlete	Event	Round of 32	Round of 16	Quarterfinal	Semifinal	Final / BM	
Athlete	Event	Opposition Score	Opposition Score	Opposition Score	Opposition Score	Opposition Score	Rank
Ku Hio Lam	Foil	–	–	–	–	–	
Lam Chi Mei	Foil	–	–	–	–	–	
Chan Hong Cheng; Ku Hio Lam; Lam Chi Mei; Lo I Nga Elia	Team foil	—N/a		–	–	–	

== Golf ==
Individual

Golfer	Event	Round 1	Round 2	Round 3	Round 4	Total		
Golfer	Event	Score	Score	Score	Score	Score	To Par	Rank
Hun Pui In	Men stroke play	77	79	Cut		156	+16	47
Lei Kun Wang	Men stroke play	75	73	Cut		148	+8	=38
Si Ngai	Men stroke play	69	69	74	71	283	+3	30
Hun Teng Teng	Women stroke play	82	80	Cut		162	+22	36

Team

Golfer	Event	Round 1	Round 2	Round 3	Round 4	Total		
Golfer	Event	Score	Score	Score	Score	Score	To Par	Rank
Hun Pui In; Lei Kun Wang; Si Ngai	Men	144	142	Cut		286	+6	13

== Karate ==
Men

Athlete	Event	Round of 16	Quarterfinals	Semifinals	Repechage	Final / BM	
Athlete	Event	Opposition Result	Opposition Result	Opposition Result	Opposition Result	Opposition Result	Rank
Fong Man Hou	Individual kata	Henry (MAS); W 5–0	Tu C-h (TPE); W 5–0	Hung (HKG); W 4–1	—N/a	Nishiyama (JPN); L 0–5	2nd place, silver medalist(s)
Cheang Pei Lok; Fong Man Hou; Kuok Kin Hang	Team kata	—N/a	Hong Kong; W 5–0	Hong Kong; W 5–0	—N/a	Kuwait; L 0–5	2nd place, silver medalist(s)
Xu Jia Cheng	–75 kg	Bye	Batican (PHI); L 4–5	Did not advance			
Leong On Tek	+84 kg	—N/a	Sherpa (NEP); L 1–0^{H}	Did not advance			

Women

Athlete	Event	Round of 16	Quarterfinals	Semifinals	Repechage	Final / BM	
Athlete	Event	Opposition Result	Opposition Result	Opposition Result	Opposition Result	Opposition Result	Rank
Chu On kei	Individual kata	Yalalt (MGL); W 5–0	Leong (SGP); L 1–4	Did not advance			
Chu On kei Lei Kin Cheng; Lei Weng Kio	Team kata	—N/a	Chinese Taipei; L 0–5	Did not advance			
Fong Man Wai	–50 kg	Chandran (MAS); L 0–5	Did not advance		Jaman (BAN); W 4–0	Alimardanova (UZB); W 6–5	3rd place, bronze medalist(s)
Lei Hong Kio	–55 kg	Bye	Sanistyarani (INA); L 5–8	Did not advance			

== Squash ==
Athlete	Event	Round of 32	Round of 16	Quarterfinals	Semifinals	Final	
Athlete	Event	Opposition Result	Opposition Result	Opposition Result	Opposition Result	Opposition Result	Rank
Yeung Wai Leng	Women's singles	Midorikawa (JPN); L 0–3	Did not advance				
Yeung Weng Chi	Women's singles	Yattaqi (INA); W 3–2	Watanabe (JPN); L 0–3	Did not advance			

Team

Athlete	Event	Group stage					Quarterfinals	Semifinals	Final	
Athlete	Event	Opposition Result	Opposition Result	Opposition Result	Opposition Result	Rank	Opposition Result	Opposition Result	Opposition Result	Rank
Cao Chi Cheng; Liu Kwai Chi; Yeung Wai Leng; Yeung Weng Chi	Women's team	Malaysia; L 0–3	Singapore; L 1–2	Pakistan; W 3–0	China; L 1–2	2 Q	Malaysia; L 0–2	Did not advance		5

== Swimming ==
Men

Athlete	Event	Heat		Final	
Athlete	Event	Time	Rank	Time	Rank
Ng Chi Hin	50 m freestyle	22.63	15	Did not advance	
Ng Chi Hin	50 m butterfly	23.63	=6 Q	23.69	10
Chan Hou Wa	100 m freestyle	54.06	37	Did not advance	
Chan Hou Wa	200 m freestyle	1:58.14	28	Did not advance	
Chan Hou Wa	100 m backstroke	59.30	23	Did not advance	
Fok Cheng Tong	100 m freestyle	54.93	40	Did not advance	
Fok Cheng Tong	200 m freestyle	1:58.83	29	Did not advance	
Fok Cheng Tong	200 m individual medley	2:17.53	26	Did not advance	
Chao Man Hou	50 m breaststroke	27.98	12	Did not advance	
Chao Man Hou	100 m breaststroke	1:02.25	20	Did not advance	
Lam Chi Chong	50 m breaststroke	28.10	13	Did not advance	
Lam Chi Chong	100 m breaststroke	1:02.37	21	Did not advance	
Lam Chi Chong	50 m butterfly	25.02	23	Did not advance	
Chan Hou Wa; Chao Man Hou; Lam Chi Chong; Ng Chi Hin	4 × 100 m medley relay	3:47.89	14	Did not advance	

Women

Athlete	Event	Heat		Final	
Athlete	Event	Time	Rank	Time	Rank
Kuok Hei Cheng	50 m freestyle	27.23	19	Did not advance	
Kuok Hei Cheng	100 m freestyle	1:00.03	22	Did not advance	
Kuok Hei Cheng	50 m butterfly	29.78	21	Did not advance	
Chan Mei Yan	100 m freestyle	58.40	17	Did not advance	
Chan Mei Yan	50 m backstroke	30.86	=23	Did not advance	
Chan Mei Yan	100 m backstroke	1:06.59	22	Did not advance	
Wong Un Iao	50 m backstroke	30.86	=23	Did not advance	
Wong Un Iao	100 m backstroke	1:04.94	16	Did not advance	
Wong Un Iao	200 m backstroke	2:20.19	14	Did not advance	
Chen Pui Lam	50 m breaststroke	31.92	8 Q	32.11	9
Chen Pui Lam	100 m breaststroke	1:09.99	10 Q	1:10.07	10
Chen Pui Lam	200 m breaststroke	2:31.57	6 Q	2:33.70	8
Cheang Weng Chi	50 m butterfly	29.43	19	Did not advance	
Cheang Weng Chi	200 m individual medley	2:27.39	17	Did not advance	
Cheang Weng Chi	400 m individual medley	5:14.13	12	Did not advance	
Wong Un Iao; Chan Mei Yan; Cheang Weng Chi; Chen Pui Lam	4 × 100 m freestyle relay	3:56.83	8 Q	3:54.27	7
Chan Mei Yan; Cheang Weng Chi; Chen Pui Lam; Wong Un Iao	4 × 200 m freestyle relay	8:49.79	7 Q	8:42.39	7

== Table tennis ==
Singles

Athlete	Event	Round of 64	Round of 32	Round of 16	Quarterfinals	Semifinals	Final	
Athlete	Event	Opposition Score	Opposition Score	Opposition Score	Opposition Score	Opposition Score	Opposition Score	Rank
Mak Tin Ian	Men	Maharjan (NEP); W 4–1	Lin SD (CHN); L 0–4	Did not advance				
Zheng Hong	Men	Choong (MAS); L 1–4	Did not advance					
Leong On Na	Women	Soma (BAN); W 4–0	Ser (SGP); L 0–4	Did not advance				
Zhu Yuling	Women	Bye	Chen S-y (TPE); W 4–2	Pyon (PRK); W 4–	Hayata (JPN); L 0–4	Did not advance		

Doubles

Athlete	Event	Round of 64	Round of 32	Round of 16	Quarterfinals	Semifinals	Final	
Athlete	Event	Opposition Score	Opposition Score	Opposition Score	Opposition Score	Opposition Score	Opposition Score	Rank
Chan Chi In; Zheng Hong	Men	Ridoy / Bawm (BAN); W 3–0	Lam SH / Yiu KT (HKG); L 0–3	Did not advance				
Kuan Cheok; Leong On Na	Women	Bye	Chen S-y / Wu Y-s (TPE); L 1–3	Did not advance				
Kuan Cheok; Mak Tin Ian	Mixed	Bye	Wong CT / Doo HK (HKG); L 0–3	Did not advance				
Leong On Na; Zheng Hong	Mixed	Myandal / Batmönkhiin (MGL); W 3–0	Kharki / Mirkadirova (KAZ); L 2–3	Did not advance				

Team

Team	Event	Group stage			Round of 16	Quarter-finals	Semi-finals	Final	
Team	Event	Opposition Score	Opposition Score	Rank	Opposition Score	Opposition Score	Opposition Score	Opposition Score	Rank
Chan Chi In; Mak Tin Ian; Zheng Hong	Men	China; L 0–3	Qatar; L 2–3	3	Did not advance				
Kuan Cheok; Leong On Na; Zhu Yu Ling	Women	China; L 1–3	Nepal; W 3–1	2 Q	Chinese Taipei; L 1–3	Did not advance			

== Taekwondo ==
Athlete	Event	Qualification		Final	
Athlete	Event	Score	Rank	Score	Rank
Wong Chi Hin	Men's poomsae	8.4600	6	Did not advance	
Lao I Leng	Women's poomsae	8.5300	3 Q	8.8400	6

== Triathlon ==
Individual

Athlete	Event	Time						Rank
Athlete	Event	Swim (0.75 km)	Trans 1	Bike (20 km)	Trans 2	Run (5 km)	Total	Rank
Chan Chon Ip	Men	10:50	0:41	31:36	0:28	18:33	1:02:08	25
Lao Cheok Hoi	Men	10:22	0:42	31:14	0:24	19:15	1:01:57	24
Cheng U Wan	Women	10:55	0:49	33:25	0:21	21:09	1:06:39	19
Hoi Long	Women	10:15	0:41	32:00	0:18	19:14	1:02:28	13

Relay

Athlete	Event	Time						Rank
Athlete	Event	Swim (300 m)	Trans 1	Bike (6.6 km)	Trans 2	Run (1 km)	Total	Rank
Hoi Long	Mixed	4:22	0:46	10:28	0:26	7:51	23:53	—N/a
Lao Cheok Hoi	Mixed	4:35	0:49	10:45	0:23	7:21	23:53	—N/a
Cheng U Wan	Mixed	5:01	0:54	11:45	0:26	7:58	26:04	—N/a
Chan Chon Ip	Mixed	4:47	0:46	10:51	0:27	6:46	23:37	—N/a
Total	Mixed	—N/a					1:37:27	11

== Volleyball ==
=== Beach ===
Athletes	Event	Preliminary round			Round of 16	Quarterfinal	Semifinal	Final / BM	
Athletes	Event	Opposition Score	Opposition Score	Rank	Opposition Score	Opposition Score	Opposition Score	Opposition Score	Rank
Law Weng Sam; Leong On Ieng	Women's	Xia XY / Yan Xu (CHN); L 0–2 (13–21, 16–21)	Đinh / Mai (VIE); L 0–2 (13–21, 20–22)	3	Did not advance				

== Wushu ==
=== Taolu ===
Men

Athlete	Event	Event 1		Event 2		Total	Rank
Athlete	Event	Result	Rank	Result	Rank	Total	Rank
Kuong Chi Hin	Changquan	9.723	1	—N/a		9.723	1st place, gold medalist(s)
Song Chi Khuan	Changquan	9.720	2	—N/a		9.720	2nd place, silver medalist(s)
Chan Chi Ngou	Nanquan & nangun	9.543	13	9.713	4	19.256	12
Huang Junhua	Nanquan & nangun	9.700	9	9.710	7	19.410	6

Women

Athlete	Event	Event 1		Event 2		Total	Rank
Athlete	Event	Result	Rank	Result	Rank	Total	Rank
Sou Cho Man	Changquan	9.710	2	—N/a		9.710	2nd place, silver medalist(s)
Wong Weng Ian	Changquan	9.690	7	—N/a		9.690	7
Wong Sam In	Nanquan & nandao	9.543	8	9.700	3	19.243	7

=== Sanda ===
Athlete	Event	Round of 32	Round of 16	Quarter-finals	Semi-finals	Final	
Athlete	Event	Opposition Score	Opposition Score	Opposition Score	Opposition Score	Opposition Score	Rank
Guo Tun Hung	Men's –65 kg	Bye	Ashrafi (AFG); L 0–2	Did not advance			
Un Iat Wai	Men's –70 kg	—N/a	Trương (VIE); L 0–2	Did not advance			
Chu Man Sin	Women's –60 kg	—N/a	Shin (KOR); W 2–0	Roshibina (IND); L PD	Did not advance		
