= Swimming at the 2026 Asian Games – Women's 100 metre freestyle =

Women's 100 metre freestyle at the 2026 Asian Games
- Venue: Tokyo Aquatics Centre
- Date: 22 September 2026
- Competitors: 35 from 23 nations

Medalists
gold medal	Siobhán Haughey	Hong Kong
silver medal	Yu Yiting	China
bronze medal	Cheng Yujie	China

The women's 100 metre freestyle event at the 2026 Asian Games took place on 22 September 2026 at the Tokyo Aquatics Centre. Hong Kong's Siobhán Haughey, the defending champion, won the gold medal in 52.45 seconds, ahead of China's Yu Yiting and Cheng Yujie, who won silver and bronze in 53.21 and 53.47 seconds, respectively.

== Schedule ==
All times are Japan Standard Time (UTC+09:00)

Date	Time	Event
Tuesday, 22 September 2026	10:00	Heats
Tuesday, 22 September 2026	17:00	Final

== Records ==
Prior to this competition, the existing world, Asian and Games records were as follows.

World Record	Marrit Steenbergen (NED)	51.68	Rome, Italy	27 June 2026
Asian Record	Siobhán Haughey (HKG)	52.02	Berlin, Germany	8 October 2023
Games Record	Siobhán Haughey (HKG)	52.17	Hangzhou, China	26 September 2023

== Results ==
=== Heats ===
Rank	Heat	Athlete	Time	Notes
1	4	Siobhán Haughey (HKG)	53.60	Q
2	4	Kayla Sanchez (PHI)	54.22	Q
3	2	Cheng Yujie (CHN)	54.50	Q
4	3	Yu Yiting (CHN)	54.61	Q
5	3	Nagisa Ikemoto (JPN)	55.14	Q
=5	2	Hur Yeon-kyung (KOR)	55.14	Q
7	3	Shiho Matsumoto (JPN)	55.58	Q
=7	4	Li Sum Yiu (HKG)	55.58	Q
9	2	Liu Pei-yin (TPE)	55.81	Q
10	4	Heather White (PHI)	55.82	Q
11	2	Jo Hyun-ju (KOR)	56.43	Reserve
12	3	Nadia Aisha Nurazmi (INA)	56.53	Reserve
13	3	Nguyễn Thủy (VIE)	56.83	
14	4	Sofia Spodarenko (KAZ)	56.99	
15	4	Sofiya Abubakirova (KAZ)	57.66	
16	2	Aiymkyz Aidaralieva (KGZ)	58.04	NR
17	1	Chan Mei Yan (MAC)	58.40	
=17	3	Ploy Leelayana (THA)	58.40	
19	2	Enkhkhuslen Batbayar (MGL)	58.41	
20	3	Varissara Nopthong (THA)	58.49	
21	2	Christina Schulz (SGP)	58.57	
22	2	Kuok Hei Cheng (MAC)	1:00.03	
23	3	Asma Lefalher (BRN)	1:00.17	
24	4	Kayley Goh (SGP)	1:01.14	
25	4	Amani Alobaidli (BRN)	1:01.22	
26	4	Haley Rose Sakbun (CAM)	1:01.31	
27	4	Maya Khalil (PLE)	1:01.97	
28	3	Orgilmaa Badrakh (MGL)	1:03.35	
29	1	Valeriya Mirenskaya (TKM)	1:03.50	
30	2	Aarya Maharjan (NEP)	1:04.35	
31	3	Meral Latheef (MDV)	1:04.37	
32	2	Yasmine Alsabih (KUW)	1:05.57	
33	1	Tamsiri Niyomxay (LAO)	1:06.70	
34	1	Jana Hussain (KUW)	1:07.07	
35	1	Emiliya Khalikova (TJK)	1:15.00	

=== Final ===
Rank	Athlete	Time	Notes
1st place, gold medalist(s)	Siobhán Haughey (HKG)	52.45	
2nd place, silver medalist(s)	Yu Yiting (CHN)	53.21	
3rd place, bronze medalist(s)	Cheng Yujie (CHN)	53.47	
4	Kayla Sanchez (PHI)	53.65	
5	Nagisa Ikemoto (JPN)	54.64	
6	Hur Yeon-kyung (KOR)	55.18	
7	Shiho Matsumoto (JPN)	55.45	
=7	Li Sum Yiu (HKG)	55.45	
9	Liu Pei-yin (TPE)	55.94	
10	Heather White (PHI)	56.01	
