= Fencing at the 2026 Asian Games – Women's individual foil =

Women's individual foil at the 2026 Asian Games
- Venue: Aichi Sky Expo Hall F
- Date: 23 September 2026
- Competitors: 24 from 14 nations

Medalists
gold medal	Yuka Ueno	Japan
silver medal	Park Ji-hee	South Korea
bronze medal	Polina Volobueva	Uzbekistan
bronze medal	Maxine Wong	Singapore

The women's individual foil competition at the 2026 Asian Games in Nagoya was held on 23 September 2026 at the Aichi Sky Expo Hall F. Japan's Yuka Ueno defeated Park Ji-hee of South Korea 15–4 in the final to win the gold medal.

== Schedule ==
All times are Japan Standard Time (UTC+09:00)

Date	Time	Event
Wednesday, 23 September 2026	10:00	Round of pools
Wednesday, 23 September 2026	13:00	Table of 32
Wednesday, 23 September 2026	13:40	Table of 16
Wednesday, 23 September 2026	14:50	Quarterfinals
Wednesday, 23 September 2026	16:20	Semifinals
Wednesday, 23 September 2026	17:40	Gold medal bout

== Results ==
=== Round of pools ===
==== Pool 1 ====
Athlete	HKG	PHI	IND	JPN	INA	UZB
Valerie Cheng (HKG)	—	5–0	5–2	2–5	5–2	5–2
Janna Allysah Catantan (PHI)	0–5	—	3–5	0–5	5–1	4–5
Mina Devi Naorem (IND)	2–5	5–3	—	1–5	4–5	1–5
Yuka Ueno (JPN)	5–2	5–0	5–1	—	5–1	2–5
Leoda Lundy Winona (INA)	2–5	1–5	5–4	1–5	—	2–5
Polina Volobueva (UZB)	2–5	5–4	5–1	5–2	5–2	—

Legend: Blue = left column team win; Red = top row team win.

==== Pool 2 ====
Athlete	CHN	SGP	MAC	IND	OMA	JPN
Huang Qianqian (CHN)	—	5–0	5–3	5–3	5–0	2–5
Amita Berthier (SGP)	0–5	—	5–3	5–3	5–2	5–4
Ku Hio Lam (MAC)	3–5	3–5	—	5–0	5–3	5–3
Joys Ashitha Stalinraj (IND)	3–5	3–5	0–5	—	5–1	1–5
Israa Al Siyabi (OMA)	0–5	2–5	3–5	1–5	—	1–5
Komaki Kikuchi (JPN)	5–2	4–5	3–5	5–1	5–1	—

Legend: Blue = left column team win; Red = top row team win.

==== Pool 3 ====
Athlete	CHN	UAE	PHI	INA	KOR	KAZ
Fu Yingying (CHN)	—	5–3	5–4	5–0	5–0	5–0
Al-Hayam Al-Blooshi (UAE)	3–5	—	0–5	5–1	1–5	4–5
Samantha Kyle Catantan (PHI)	4–5	5–0	—	5–0	4–3	3–2
Riley Faith Kumalaputra (INA)	0–5	1–5	0–5	—	0–5	0–5
Park Ji-hee (KOR)	0–5	5–1	3–4	5–0	—	5–4
Alyona Gnoyeva (KAZ)	0–5	5–4	2–3	5–0	4–5	—

Legend: Blue = left column team win; Red = top row team win.

==== Pool 4 ====
Athlete	MAC	HKG	KAZ	QAT	SGP	KOR
Lam Chi Mei (MAC)	—	3–5	2–5	5–2	4–5	0–5
Daphne Chan (HKG)	5–3	—	5–3	5–2	5–2	3–5
Sofiya Aktayeva (KAZ)	5–2	3–5	—	5–2	5–3	4–5
Isabel Btaddini (QAT)	2–5	2–5	2–5	—	0–5	3–5
Maxine Wong (SGP)	5–4	2–5	3–5	5–0	—	5–3
Mo Byeol-i (KOR)	5–0	5–3	5–4	5–3	3–5	—

Legend: Blue = left column team win; Red = top row team win.

==== Summary ====
Rank	Pool	Athlete	W	L	W/M	TD	TF
1	3	Fu Yingying (CHN)	5	0	1.000	+18	25
2	1	Yuka Ueno (JPN)	4	1	0.800	+13	22
3	1	Valerie Cheng (HKG)	4	1	0.800	+11	22
3	2	Huang Qianqian (CHN)	4	1	0.800	+11	22
5	3	Samantha Kyle Catantan (PHI)	4	1	0.800	+11	21
6	4	Daphne Chan (HKG)	4	1	0.800	+8	23
6	4	Mo Byeol-i (KOR)	4	1	0.800	+8	23
8	1	Polina Volobueva (UZB)	4	1	0.800	+8	22
9	2	Amita Berthier (SGP)	4	1	0.800	+3	20
10	2	Komaki Kikuchi (JPN)	3	2	0.600	+8	22
11	4	Sofiya Aktayeva (KAZ)	3	2	0.600	+5	22
12	2	Ku Hio Lam (MAC)	3	2	0.600	+5	21
13	3	Park Ji-hee (KOR)	3	2	0.600	+4	18
14	4	Maxine Wong (SGP)	3	2	0.600	+3	20
15	3	Alyona Gnoyeva (KAZ)	2	3	0.400	−1	16
16	4	Lam Chi Mei (MAC)	1	4	0.200	−8	14
17	3	Al-Hayam Al-Blooshi (UAE)	1	4	0.200	−8	13
18	1	Janna Allysah Catantan (PHI)	1	4	0.200	−9	12
18	2	Joys Ashitha Stalinraj (IND)	1	4	0.200	−9	12
20	1	Mina Devi Naorem (IND)	1	4	0.200	−10	13
21	1	Leoda Lundy Winona (INA)	1	4	0.200	−13	11
22	4	Isabel Btaddini (QAT)	0	5	0.000	−16	9
23	2	Israa Al Siyabi (OMA)	0	5	0.000	−18	7
24	3	Riley Faith Kumalaputra (INA)	0	5	0.000	−24	1

=== Knockout round ===
==== Final ====
Gold medal bout
13	Park Ji-hee (KOR)	4
2	Yuka Ueno (JPN)	15

==== Top half ====
Table of 32
17	Al-Hayam Al-Blooshi (UAE)	11
16	Lam Chi Mei (MAC)	15
13	Park Ji-hee (KOR)	15
20	Mina Devi Naorem (IND)	3

Table of 16
1	Fu Yingying (CHN)	15
16	Lam Chi Mei (MAC)	8
9	Amita Berthier (SGP)	14
8	Polina Volobueva (UZB)	15
5	Samantha Kyle Catantan (PHI)	15
12	Ku Hio Lam (MAC)	13
13	Park Ji-hee (KOR)	15
4	Valerie Cheng (HKG)	9

Quarterfinals
1	Fu Yingying (CHN)	7
8	Polina Volobueva (UZB)	15
5	Samantha Kyle Catantan (PHI)	10
13	Park Ji-hee (KOR)	15

Semifinals
8	Polina Volobueva (UZB)	12
13	Park Ji-hee (KOR)	15

==== Bottom half ====
Table of 32
19	Janna Allysah Catantan (PHI)	2
14	Maxine Wong (SGP)	15
15	Alyona Gnoyeva (KAZ)	15
18	Joys Ashitha Stalinraj (IND)	14

Table of 16
3	Huang Qianqian (CHN)	10
14	Maxine Wong (SGP)	12
11	Sofiya Aktayeva (KAZ)	13
6	Daphne Chan (HKG)	15
7	Mo Byeol-i (KOR)	7
10	Komaki Kikuchi (JPN)	15
15	Alyona Gnoyeva (KAZ)	3
2	Yuka Ueno (JPN)	15

Quarterfinals
14	Maxine Wong (SGP)	15
6	Daphne Chan (HKG)	6
10	Komaki Kikuchi (JPN)	9
2	Yuka Ueno (JPN)	15

Semifinals
14	Maxine Wong (SGP)	6
2	Yuka Ueno (JPN)	15

== Final standing ==
Rank	Athlete
1st place, gold medalist(s)	Yuka Ueno (JPN)
2nd place, silver medalist(s)	Park Ji-hee (KOR)
3rd place, bronze medalist(s)	Polina Volobueva (UZB)
3rd place, bronze medalist(s)	Maxine Wong (SGP)
5	Fu Yingying (CHN)
6	Samantha Kyle Catantan (PHI)
7	Daphne Chan (HKG)
8	Komaki Kikuchi (JPN)
9	Huang Qianqian (CHN)
9	Valerie Cheng (HKG)
11	Mo Byeol-i (KOR)
12	Amita Berthier (SGP)
13	Sofiya Aktayeva (KAZ)
14	Ku Hio Lam (MAC)
15	Alyona Gnoyeva (KAZ)
16	Lam Chi Mei (MAC)
17	Al-Hayam Al-Blooshi (UAE)
18	Janna Allysah Catantan (PHI)
18	Joys Ashitha Stalinraj (IND)
20	Mina Devi Naorem (IND)
21	Leoda Lundy Winona (INA)
22	Isabel Btaddini (QAT)
23	Israa Al Siyabi (OMA)
24	Riley Faith Kumalaputra (INA)
