= Wushu at the 2026 Asian Games – Women's changquan =

Women's changquan at the 2026 Asian Games
- Venue: Aichi Budokan
- Dates: 21 September 2026
- Competitors: 16 from 11 nations

Medalists
gold medal	Lydia Sham	Hong Kong
silver medal	Sou Cho Man	Macau
bronze medal	Eugenia Diva Widodo	Indonesia

The women's changquan competition at the 2026 Asian Games was held on 21 September 2026 at Aichi Prefectural Martial Arts Hall in Nagoya, Japan.

== Schedule ==
All times are Japan Standard Time (UTC+09:00)

Date	Time	Event
Monday, 21 September 2026	09:00	Final

== Results ==
Rank	Athlete	Score
1st place, gold medalist(s)	Lydia Sham (HKG)	9.713
2nd place, silver medalist(s)	Sou Cho Man (MAC)	9.710
3rd place, bronze medalist(s)	Eugenia Diva Widodo (INA)	9.706
4	Zahra Kiani (IRI)	9.703
5	Michelle Yeung (HKG)	9.703
6	Runa Kuge (JPN)	9.700
7	Wong Weng Ian (MAC)	9.690
8	Kim Chae-young (KOR)	9.686
9	Zoe Tan (SGP)	9.683
10	Lee Jia Rong (MAS)	9.670
11	Loh Ying Ting (MAS)	9.666
12	Andrea Simon (INA)	9.603
13	Sushmita Tamang (NEP)	9.580
14	Nguyễn Thị Hiền (VIE)	9.573
15	Nyeman Wangsu (IND)	9.573
16	Kana Ikeuchi (JPN)	9.440
