= Karate at the 2026 Asian Games – Men's team kata =

Men's team kata at the 2026 Asian Games
- Venue: Toyohashi City General Gymnasium
- Date: 23 September 2026
- Competitors: 21 from 7 nations

Medalists
gold medal	Kuwait; Mohammad Al-Mosawi, Salman Al-Mosawi, Mohammad Bader
silver medal	Macau; Cheang Pei Lok, Fong Man Hou, Kuok Kin Hang
bronze medal	Hong Kong; Howard Hung, Li Chi Kong, Tang Yu Hin
bronze medal	Malaysia; Aiqal Asmadie, Haznil Henry, Mukhriz Mazlan

The men's team kata event at the 2026 Asian Games took place on 23 September 2026 at Toyohashi City General Gymnasium, Toyohashi, Japan. Seven teams competed in a knockout format, with Kuwait defeating Macau 5–0 in the final to win the gold medal, while Hong Kong and Malaysia took the bronze medals.

== Schedule ==
All times are Japan Standard Time (UTC+09:00)

Date	Time	Event
Wednesday, 23 September 2026	10:00	Quarterfinals
Wednesday, 23 September 2026	10:00	Semifinals
Wednesday, 23 September 2026	10:00	Bronze medal bouts
Wednesday, 23 September 2026	14:25	Final

== Squads ==
Cambodia	Chinese Taipei	Hong Kong	Kuwait
Chheng Chandararattanak; Ho Heng; Theng Kimchhea	Chang Yun-hsiang; Li Hsiang-hsuan; Tu Cheng-han	Howard Hung; Li Chi Kong; Tang Yu Hin	Mohammad Al-Mosawi; Salman Al-Mosawi; Mohammad Bader
Macau	Malaysia	Vietnam	
Cheang Pei Lok; Fong Man Hou; Kuok Kin Hang	Aiqal Asmadie; Haznil Henry; Mukhriz Mazlan	Giang Việt Anh; Phạm Minh Đức; Phạm Trường Giang	

== Results ==
=== Main bracket ===
Quarterfinals		Semifinals		Final
Chinese Taipei	4
Cambodia	1	Chinese Taipei	0
Macau	5	Macau	5
Hong Kong	0			Macau	0
Vietnam	0			Kuwait	5
Kuwait	5	Kuwait	5
		Malaysia	0

=== Repechage ===
Bronze medal bouts
Hong Kong	3
Chinese Taipei	2
Vietnam	2
Malaysia	3
