= Wushu at the 2026 Asian Games – Men's changquan =

Men's changquan at the 2026 Asian Games
- Venue: Aichi Budokan
- Dates: 20 September 2026
- Competitors: 21 from 18 nations

Medalists
gold medal	Kuong Chi Hin	Macau
silver medal	Song Chi Kuan	Macau
bronze medal	Seraf Naro Siregar	Indonesia

The men's changquan competition at the 2026 Asian Games was held on 20 September 2026 at Aichi Prefectural Martial Arts Hall in Nagoya, Japan.

== Schedule ==
All times are Japan Standard Time (UTC+09:00)

Date	Time	Event
Sunday, 20 September 2026	09:00	Final

== Results ==
Rank	Athlete	Score
1st place, gold medalist(s)	Kuong Chi Hin (MAC)	9.723
2nd place, silver medalist(s)	Song Chi Kuan (MAC)	9.720
3rd place, bronze medalist(s)	Seraf Naro Siregar (INA)	9.720
4	Chia Kai Ming (SGP)	9.716
5	Ho Yin Ching (HKG)	9.706
6	Lee Yong-hyun (KOR)	9.703
7	Danish Aizad (MAS)	9.700
8	Chen Jinsong (HKG)	9.700
9	Kohtarou Higashi (JPN)	9.693
10	Sandrex Gainsan (PHI)	9.690
11	M. Suraj Singh (IND)	9.683
12	Nguyễn Văn Sỹ (VIE)	9.603
13	Abolfazl Gharehbaghi (IRI)	9.593
14	Walid Lachkar (BRU)	9.493
15	Aziz Kakhramonov (UZB)	9.353
16	Kaveesh Bandara (SRI)	9.346
17	Weerachat Koolsawatmongkol (THA)	9.220
18	Mark Anthony Polo (PHI)	9.206
19	Bijay Sinjali (NEP)	9.146
20	Mugahed Mohammed (YEM)	9.083
21	Cheng Yu-hsuan (TPE)	8.793
