= Wushu at the 2026 Asian Games – Men's nanquan & nangun =

Men's nanquan & nangun at the 2026 Asian Games
- Venue: Aichi Budokan
- Dates: 22 September 2026
- Competitors: 18 from 13 nations

Medalists
| gold medal | Li Jianming | China |
| silver medal | Lau Chi Lung | Hong Kong |
| bronze medal | Liu Chang-min | Chinese Taipei |

The men's nanquan and nangun all-round competition at the 2026 Asian Games was held on 22 September 2026 at Aichi Prefectural Martial Arts Hall in Nagoya, Japan.

== Schedule ==
All times are Japan Standard Time (UTC+09:00)

| Date | Time | Event |
|---|---|---|
| Tuesday, 22 September 2026 | 09:00 | Nanquan |
| Tuesday, 22 September 2026 | 14:30 | Nangun |

== Results ==
| Rank | Athlete | Nanquan | Nangun | Total |
|---|---|---|---|---|
| 1st place, gold medalist(s) | Li Jianming (CHN) | 9.780 | 9.783 | 19.563 |
| 2nd place, silver medalist(s) | Lau Chi Lung (HKG) | 9.730 | 9.726 | 19.456 |
| 3rd place, bronze medalist(s) | Liu Chang-min (TPE) | 9.720 | 9.710 | 19.430 |
| 4 | Huang Wen-sheng (TPE) | 9.703 | 9.726 | 19.429 |
| 5 | Terrence Tjahyadi (INA) | 9.703 | 9.710 | 19.413 |
| 6 | Huang Junhua (MAC) | 9.700 | 9.710 | 19.410 |
| 7 | Ahmad Ghozali Fuaiz (INA) | 9.696 | 9.693 | 19.389 |
| 8 | Mohammad Adi Salihin (BRU) | 9.706 | 9.680 | 19.386 |
| 9 | Shahin Banitalebi (IRI) | 9.736 | 9.616 | 19.352 |
| 10 | Abel Lim (BRU) | 9.653 | 9.683 | 19.336 |
| 11 | Deepak Hamal (NEP) | 9.660 | 9.673 | 19.333 |
| 12 | Chan Chi Ngou (MAC) | 9.543 | 9.713 | 19.256 |
| 13 | Đỗ Đức Tài (VIE) | 9.213 | 9.680 | 18.893 |
| 14 | Kim Jin-su (KOR) | 9.726 | 9.086 | 18.812 |
| 15 | Diyorbek Duyshaboev (UZB) | 8.940 | 9.660 | 18.600 |
| 16 | Pitaya Yangrungrawin (THA) | 9.443 | 8.990 | 18.433 |
| 17 | Wanchai Yodyinghathaikun (THA) | 8.766 | 9.526 | 18.292 |
| 18 | Bassam Lwza (YEM) | 8.843 | 8.283 | 17.126 |
