= Table tennis at the 2026 Asian Games – Men's doubles =

Men's doubles at the 2026 Asian Games
- Venue: Sky Hall Toyota
- Dates: 23–27 September 2026
- Competitors: 80 from 25 nations

Medalists
gold medal	Lin Shidong; Huang Youzheng	China
silver medal	Tomokazu Harimoto; Hiroto Shinozuka	Japan
bronze medal	Xiang Peng; Wen Ruibo	China
bronze medal	Sora Matsushima; Shunsuke Togami	Japan

Table tennis at the 2026 Asian Games – Men's doubles was one of the events of the table tennis competition at the 2026 Asian Games. Matches through the quarterfinals were played as best-of-five, while the semifinals and final were played as best-of-seven.

== Seeds ==
- Doubles seeding was determined by adding the individual doubles rankings on September 14; the lower the sum, the higher the seeding.
1. (China) Lin Shidong / Huang Youzheng
2. (India) Manush Shah / Manav Thakkar
3. (South Korea) Oh Junsung / Lim Jong-hoon
4. (Hong Kong) Chan Ho Wah / Wong Chun Ting
5. (Singapore) Koen Pang / Izaac Quek
6. (Japan) Shunsuke Togami / Sora Matsushima
7. (China) Xiang Peng / Wen Ruibo
8. (Chinese Taipei) Feng Yi-hsin / Kuo Guan-hong
9. (India) Sathiyan Gnanasekaran / Harmeet Desai
10. (Singapore) Chew Zhe Yu / Chua Josh
11. (South Korea) Park Gyu-hyeon / Jang Woo-jin
12. (Hong Kong) Lam Siu Hang / Yiu Kwan To
13. (Kazakhstan) Kirill Gerassimenko / Alan Kurmangaliyev
14. (Malaysia) Wong Qi Shen / Choong Jarven
15. (Kazakhstan) Aidos Kenzhigulov / Sanzhar Zhubanov
16. (Chinese Taipei) Hung Jing-kai / Hsu Hsien-chia

== Knockout stage ==
=== Finals ===
Semifinals
1	Lin S. (CHN); Huang Y. (CHN)	11	12	11	11	11
6	Togami S. (JPN); Matsushima S. (JPN)	13	10	6	9	6
7	Xiang P. (CHN); Wen R. (CHN)	11	11	9	11	10	7	4
Harimoto T. (JPN); Shinozuka H. (JPN)	9	6	11	1	12	11	11

Final
1	Lin S. (CHN); Huang Y. (CHN)	6	11	12	11	11	11
Harimoto T. (JPN); Shinozuka H. (JPN)	11	4	14	6	5	1

=== Top half ===
==== Section 1 ====
First round
Zheng H. (MAC); Chan C. (MAC)	11	11	11
Bawm R. (BAN); Ridoy M. (BAN)	6	8	6
Ismail M. (MDV); Ahmed M. (MDV)	5	11	5	11	8
Ghaffari A. (IRI); Faraji B. (IRI)	11	8	11	8	11

Second round
1	Lin S. (CHN); Huang Y. (CHN)	11	11	11
Bodisuren E. (MGL); Bodisuren En. (MGL)	3	1	2
Zheng H. (MAC); Chan C. (MAC)	20	8	8
12	Lam S. (HKG); Yiu K. (HKG)	22	11	11
13	Gerassimenko K. (KAZ); Kurmangaliyev A. (KAZ)	11	7	11	11
Ghaffari A. (IRI); Faraji B. (IRI)	8	11	9	4
Hagberg J. (LAO); Vongsa A. (LAO)	6	5	6
8	Feng Y. (TPE); Kuo G. (TPE)	11	11	11

Third round
1	Lin S. (CHN); Huang Y. (CHN)	11	11	11
12	Lam S. (HKG); Yiu K. (HKG)	9	7	4
13	Gerassimenko K. (KAZ); Kurmangaliyev A. (KAZ)	5	8	7
8	Feng Y. (TPE); Kuo G. (TPE)	11	11	11

Quarterfinals
1	Lin S. (CHN); Huang Y. (CHN)	11	17	11
8	Feng Y. (TPE); Kuo G. (TPE)	9	15	4

==== Section 2 ====
First round
Abdulhussein A. (QAT); Ahussein M. (QAT)	8	7	9
Negara M. (INA); Pratama A. (INA)	11	11	11
Mahfoodh S. (BHR); Alaali M. (BHR)	11	11	11
Khan A. (PAK); Bilal T. (PAK)	4	6	9

Second round
6	Togami S. (JPN); Matsushima S. (JPN)	11	11	11
Maharjan R. (NEP); Kapali S. (NEP)	1	1	5
Negara M. (INA); Pratama A. (INA)	4	7	11	11	6
9	Gnanasekaran S. (IND); Desai H. (IND)	11	11	7	8	11
10	Chew Z. (SGP); Chua J. (SGP)	15	11	11
Mahfoodh S. (BHR); Alaali M. (BHR)	13	3	3
Preechayan T. (THA); Sanguansin P. (THA)	2	5	4
3	Oh J. (KOR); Lim J. (KOR)	11	11	11

Third round
6	Togami S. (JPN); Matsushima S. (JPN)	11	11	11
9	Gnanasekaran S. (IND); Desai H. (IND)	5	9	9
10	Chew Z. (SGP); Chua J. (SGP)	5	11	7
3	Oh J. (KOR); Lim J. (KOR)	11	13	11

Quarterfinals
6	Togami S. (JPN); Matsushima S. (JPN)	7	11	11	12
3	Oh J. (KOR); Lim J. (KOR)	11	4	6	10

=== Bottom half ===
==== Section 3 ====
First round
Alamian N. (IRI); Alamiyan N. (IRI)	11	11	11
Khan M. (PAK); Khan A. (PAK)	4	5	2
Desrizal G. (INA); Inzaghi M. (INA)	3	4	5
Ri J. (PRK); U T. (PRK)	11	11	11

Second round
4	Chan H. (HKG); Wong C. (HKG)	11	11	11
Khalid A. (MDV); Rafi U. (MDV)	5	5	3
Alamian N. (IRI); Alamiyan N. (IRI)	12	9	11	11	11
15	Kenzhigulov A. (KAZ); Zhubanov S. (KAZ)	10	11	13	8	7
11	Park G. (KOR); Jang W. (KOR)	9	6	9
Ri J. (PRK); U T. (PRK)	11	11	11
Gubran E. (YEM); Aldhubhani M. (YEM)	0	3	6
7	Xiang P. (CHN); Wen R. (CHN)	11	11	11

Third round
4	Chan H. (HKG); Wong C. (HKG)	8	6	11	9
Alamian N. (IRI); Alamiyan N. (IRI)	11	11	9	11
Ri J. (PRK); U T. (PRK)	8	11	11	3
7	Xiang P. (CHN); Wen R. (CHN)	11	5	13	11

Quarterfinals
Alamian N. (IRI); Alamiyan N. (IRI)	6	10	3
7	Xiang P. (CHN); Wen R. (CHN)	11	12	11

==== Section 4 ====
First round
Al-Kuwari S. (QAT); Korani A. (QAT)	12	11	11	11
Myandal T. (MGL); Ankhbayar B. (MGL)	10	13	4	4
Kasymov A. (KGZ); Kasymov At. (KGZ)	2	5	4
Saleh M. (BHR); Rashed R. (BHR)	11	11	11

Second round
5	Pang K. (SGP); Quek I. (SGP)	11	11	11
Dilshodov D. (UZB); Iskandarov S. (UZB)	6	3	6
Al-Kuwari S. (QAT); Korani A. (QAT)	4	16	7	11	4
14	Wong Q. (MAS); Choong J. (MAS)	11	14	11	7	11
16	Hung J. (TPE); Hsu H. (TPE)	14	11	13
Saleh M. (BHR); Rashed R. (BHR)	12	4	11
Harimoto T. (JPN); Shinozuka H. (JPN)	11	11	7	11
2	Shah M. (IND); Thakkar M. (IND)	7	9	11	6

Third round
5	Pang K. (SGP); Quek I. (SGP)	11	11	11
14	Wong Q. (MAS); Choong J. (MAS)	3	9	7
16	Hung J. (TPE); Hsu H. (TPE)	12	6	7	7
Harimoto T. (JPN); Shinozuka H. (JPN)	10	11	11	11

Quarterfinals
5	Pang K. (SGP); Quek I. (SGP)	9	10	9
Harimoto T. (JPN); Shinozuka H. (JPN)	11	12	11
