= Karate at the 2026 Asian Games – Men's kata =

Men's kata at the 2026 Asian Games
- Venue: Toyohashi City General Gymnasium
- Date: 21 September 2026
- Competitors: 12 from 12 nations

Medalists
gold medal	Kakeru Nishiyama	Japan
silver medal	Fong Man Hou	Macau
bronze medal	Howard Hung	Hong Kong
bronze medal	Mohammad Al-Mosawi	Kuwait

The men's individual kata competition at the 2026 Asian Games took place on 21 September 2026 at Toyohashi City General Gymnasium, Toyohashi. Kakeru Nishiyama of Japan defeated Macau's Fong Man Hou 5–0 in the final to win the gold medal, giving Japan its third consecutive title in the event.

== Schedule ==
All times are Japan Standard Time (UTC+09:00)

Date	Time	Event
Monday, 21 September 2026	10:00	Round of 16
Monday, 21 September 2026	10:00	Quarterfinals
Monday, 21 September 2026	10:00	Semifinals
Monday, 21 September 2026	10:00	Repechage
Monday, 21 September 2026	10:00	Bronze medal bouts
Monday, 21 September 2026	17:05	Final

== Results ==
=== Main bracket ===
Round of 16
Haznil Henry (MAS)	0
Fong Man Hou (MAC)	5
Hwang Tae-yeon (KOR)	1
Howard Hung (HKG)	4
Phạm Minh Đức (VIE)	3
Theng Kimchhea (CAM)	2
Brion Edward (SRI)	0
Kakeru Nishiyama (JPN)	5

Quarterfinals
Fong Man Hou (MAC)	5
Tu Cheng-han (TPE)	0
Howard Hung (HKG)	5
Badar-Uugany Möngölögdölgöön (MGL)	0
Phạm Minh Đức (VIE)	0
Mohammad Al-Mosawi (KUW)	5
Kakeru Nishiyama (JPN)	5
Christopher Edbert (INA)	0

Semifinals
Fong Man Hou (MAC)	4
Howard Hung (HKG)	1
Mohammad Al-Mosawi (KUW)	1
Kakeru Nishiyama (JPN)	4

Final
Fong Man Hou (MAC)	0
Kakeru Nishiyama (JPN)	5

=== Repechage ===
Repechage round 1
Haznil Henry (MAS)	5
Tu Cheng-han (TPE)	0
Brion Edward (SRI)	0
Christopher Edbert (INA)	5

Bronze medal bouts
Haznil Henry (MAS)	0
Howard Hung (HKG)	5
Christopher Edbert (INA)	2
Mohammad Al-Mosawi (KUW)	3
