= Table tennis at the 2026 Asian Games – Women's singles =

Women's singles at the Table tennis at the 2026 Asian Games
- Venue: Sky Hall Toyota
- Dates: 23–27 September 2026
- Competitors: 46 from 25 nations

Medalists
gold medal	Wang Manyu	China
silver medal	Sun Yingsha	China
bronze medal	Miwa Harimoto	Japan
bronze medal	Hina Hayata	Japan

Table tennis at the 2026 Asian Games – Women's singles was an event at the 2026 Asian Games, held from 23 to 27 September 2026 at the Sky Hall Toyota. All singles matches are knockout matches, played as best-of-seven games.

Wang Manyu defeated defending champion Sun Yingsha in the final to win her third gold medal of the 2026 Asian Games.

== Seeds ==
- Seeding was determined by the International Table Tennis Federation world rankings released on September 14.
1. (China) Wang Manyu
2. (China) Sun Yingsha
3. (Japan) Miwa Harimoto
4. (Japan) Hina Hayata
5. (Macau) Zhu Yuling
6. (South Korea) Shin Yu-bin
7. (South Korea) Joo Cheon-hui
8. (Chinese Taipei) Cheng I-ching
9. (Hong Kong) Doo Hoi Kem
10. (Singapore) Zeng Jian
11. (India) Sreeja Akula
12. (Hong Kong) So Tsz Tung
13. (India) Yashaswini Ghorpade
14. (Singapore) Ser Lin Qian
15. (Thailand) Orawan Paranang
16. (Kazakhstan) Zauresh Akasheva

== Knockout stage ==
=== Finals ===
Semifinals
1	Wang Manyu (CHN)	11	11	12	9	11
3	Miwa Harimoto (JPN)	8	4	10	11	6
4	Hina Hayata (JPN)	6	7	11	9	5
2	Sun Yingsha (CHN)	11	11	9	11	11

Final
1	Wang Manyu (CHN)	11	11	11	11	4	15
2	Sun Yingsha (CHN)	8	9	13	9	11	13

=== Top half ===
==== Section 1 ====
First round
Sisomboun C. (LAO)	4	8	3	6
Batmunkh B. (MGL)	11	11	11	11
Thapa E. (NEP)	3	6	2	8
Kamalova A. (UZB)	11	11	11	11
Ashtari M. (IRI)	11	7	9	9	10
Rasmi C. (INA)	3	11	11	11	12

Second round
1	Wang M. (CHN)	11	11	11	11
Mohamed A. (QAT)	2	8	2	1
Batmunkh B. (MGL)	4	12	10	7	4
9	Doo H. (HKG)	11	10	12	11	11
16	Akasheva Z. (KAZ)	11	11	11	11
Kamalova A. (UZB)	5	7	6	6
Rasmi C. (INA)	3	5	2	7
6	Shin Y. (KOR)	11	11	11	11

Third round
1	Wang M. (CHN)	11	9	11	11	11
9	Doo H. (HKG)	9	11	3	9	5
16	Akasheva Z. (KAZ)	7	5	5	4
6	Shin Y. (KOR)	11	11	11	11

Quarterfinals
1	Wang M. (CHN)	11	11	11	11
6	Shin Y. (KOR)	9	6	6	5

==== Section 2 ====
First round
Ali F. (MDV)	5	1	3	7
Kim K. (PRK)	11	11	11	11
Leong O. (MAC)	11	11	11	11
Soma S. (BAN)	3	5	1	4
Zaza H. (SYR)	11	11	11	11
Khan K. (PAK)	3	3	2	6
Azar T. (LBN)	10	4	4	1
Sawettabut S. (THA)	12	11	11	11

Second round
8	Cheng I. (TPE)	11	9	7	12	7	11	3
Kim K. (PRK)	9	11	11	10	11	5	11
Leong O. (MAC)	9	4	11	7
14	Ser L. (SGP)	11	11	13	11
13	Ghorpade Y. (IND)	11	11	11	8	11
Zaza H. (SYR)	5	5	8	11	4
Sawettabut S. (THA)	4	10	10	5
3	Harimoto M. (JPN)	11	12	12	11

Third round
Kim K. (PRK)	11	11	11	14
14	Ser L. (SGP)	7	7	9	12
13	Ghorpade Y. (IND)	9	5	11	4	5
3	Harimoto M. (JPN)	11	11	4	11	11

Quarterfinals
Kim K. (PRK)	7	10	8	7
3	Harimoto M. (JPN)	11	12	11	11

=== Bottom half ===
==== Section 3 ====
First round
Nebuchadnezzar A. (INA)	11	12	11	6	1	10	5
Iloukhani S. (IRI)	9	10	8	11	11	12	11
Sanjaa B. (MGL)	7	1	11	3	6
Erkebaeva A. (UZB)	11	11	8	11	11
Mirkadirova S. (KAZ)	12	7	9	9	6
Pyon S. (PRK)	10	11	11	11	11
Chen S. (TPE)	9	11	11	11	11
Shrestha N. (NEP)	11	4	4	0	3

Second round
4	Hayata H. (JPN)	11	11	11	11
Iloukhani S. (IRI)	5	7	4	8
Erkebaeva A. (UZB)	4	8	11	8	12	7
12	So T. (HKG)	11	11	8	11	10	11
11	Akula S. (IND)	7	8	13	7	7
Pyon S. (PRK)	11	11	11	11	11
Chen S. (TPE)	9	12	5	11	11	9
5	Zhu Y. (MAC)	11	10	11	13	3	11

Third round
4	Hayata H. (JPN)	11	11	11	7	11
12	So T. (HKG)	3	1	8	11	7
Pyon S. (PRK)	12	4	6	10	11	11	7
5	Zhu Y. (MAC)	10	11	11	12	6	6	11

Quarterfinals
4	Hayata H. (JPN)	11	12	11	12
5	Zhu Y. (MAC)	5	10	8	10

==== Section 4 ====
First round
Swarna B. (SRI)	11	11	11	9	11
Aiazbekova N. (KGZ)	4	9	2	11	4
Chiri B. (LBN)	8	10	9	6
Abboud R. (SYR)	11	12	11	11
Mahi N. (BAN)	11	10	11	6	5	9
Nazim A. (MDV)	9	12	7	11	11	11

Second round
7	Joo C. (KOR)	11	11	11	11
Swarna B. (SRI)	8	7	2	4
Abboud R. (SYR)	2	1	2	2
10	Zeng J. (SGP)	11	11	11	11
15	Paranang O. (THA)	11	11	11	11
Nazim A. (MDV)	5	8	5	6
Ali M. (QAT)	2	2	4	2
2	Sun Y. (CHN)	11	11	11	11

Third round
7	Joo C. (KOR)	11	7	11	11	8	11
10	Zeng J. (SGP)	6	11	9	8	11	9
15	Paranang O. (THA)	5	8	4	8
2	Sun Y. (CHN)	11	11	11	11

Quarterfinals
7	Joo C. (KOR)	9	12	3	11	13	8
2	Sun Y. (CHN)	11	14	11	7	11	11
