= Swimming at the 2026 Asian Games – Men's 200 metre freestyle =

Men's 200 metre freestyle at the 2026 Asian Games
- Venue: Tokyo Aquatics Centre
- Date: 23 September 2026
- Competitors: 24 from 18 nations

Medalists
gold medal	Zhang Zhanshuo	China
silver medal	Hwang Sun-woo	South Korea
bronze medal	Tatsuya Murasa	Japan

The men's 200 metre freestyle event at the 2026 Asian Games took place on 23 September 2026 at the Tokyo Aquatics Centre. China's Zhang Zhanshuo won the gold medal in an Asian record time of 1:43.49, which ranked as the fifth-fastest time in the event's history, defeating defending champion Hwang Sun-woo of South Korea, who won the silver medal in 1:44.62.

== Schedule ==
All times are Japan Standard Time (UTC+09:00)

Date	Time	Event
Wednesday, 23 September 2026	10:30	Heats
Wednesday, 23 September 2026	17:24	Final

== Records ==
Prior to this competition, the existing world, Asian and Games records were as follows.

World Record	Paul Biedermann (GER)	1:42.00	Rome, Italy	28 July 2009
Asian Record	Hwang Sun-woo (KOR)	1:43.92	Busan, South Korea	20 October 2025
Games Record	Hwang Sun-woo (KOR)	1:44.40	Hangzhou, China	27 September 2023

== Results ==
=== Heats ===
Rank	Heat	Athlete	Time	Notes
1	3	Tatsuya Murasa (JPN)	1:47.60	Q
2	2	Hwang Sun-woo (KOR)	1:47.97	Q
3	2	Kazusa Kuroda (JPN)	1:48.57	Q
4	3	Ali Hassan (QAT)	1:48.66	Q, NR
5	4	Zhang Zhanshuo (CHN)	1:48.68	Q
6	4	Xu Haibo (CHN)	1:48.84	Q
7	4	Khiew Hoe Yean (MAS)	1:48.96	Q
8	4	Gian Santos (PHI)	1:49.34	Q
=9	3	Arvin Singh (MAS)	1:49.46	Q
=9	4	Pongpanod Trithan (THA)	1:49.46	Q
11	2	Glen Lim (SGP)	1:49.59	Reserve
12	4	Liquor Harrison Andoko (INA)	1:49.89	Reserve
13	3	Azman Ardi (SGP)	1:49.97	
14	3	Made Aubrey Jaya (INA)	1:50.52	
15	3	Maxim Klimenko (KAZ)	1:50.69	
16	3	Lo Tsz-lam (HKG)	1:51.14	
17	2	Aneesh Gowda (IND)	1:51.20	
18	2	Batbayaryn Enkhtamir (MGL)	1:51.68	
19	2	Vedaant Madhavan (IND)	1:52.01	
20	2	Nguyễn Viết Tường (VIE)	1:52.21	
21	4	Fedor Didenko (KAZ)	1:52.26	
22	4	Emile Fouzai (QAT)	1:52.45	
23	4	Mohammad Ghasemi (IRI)	1:53.39	
24	2	Kwan Tsz-bok (HKG)	1:53.55	
25	2	Wongsakorn Patsamarn (THA)	1:53.71	
26	3	Saoud Al-Shamroukh (KUW)	1:55.95	
27	4	Soud Alenzi (KUW)	1:56.19	
28	3	Chan Hou Wa (MAC)	1:58.14	
29	1	Fok Cheng Tong (MAC)	1:58.83	
30	1	Maidar Gongor (MGL)	2:01.95	
31	1	Mohamed Alyammahi (UAE)	2:06.29	
	3	Kim Woo-min (KOR)	DNS	

=== Final ===
Rank	Athlete	Time	Notes
1st place, gold medalist(s)	Zhang Zhanshuo (CHN)	1:43.49	AR
2nd place, silver medalist(s)	Hwang Sun-woo (KOR)	1:44.62	
3rd place, bronze medalist(s)	Tatsuya Murasa (JPN)	1:44.81	
4	Xu Haibo (CHN)	1:46.88	
5	Kazusa Kuroda (JPN)	1:47.45	
6	Ali Hassan (QAT)	1:48.00	NR
7	Khiew Hoe Yean (MAS)	1:48.58	
8	Arvin Singh (MAS)	1:49.45	
9	Pongpanod Trithan (THA)	1:49.46	
10	Gian Santos (PHI)	1:49.80	
