= Triathlon at the 2026 Asian Games – Men's individual =

Men's individual at the 2026 Asian Games
- Venue: Gamagōri City Triathlon Venue
- Date: 20 September 2026
- Competitors: 33 from 20 nations

Medalists
gold medal	Takumi Hojo	Japan
silver medal	Zhang Xirui	China
bronze medal	Arlan Zhanabay	Kazakhstan

The men's triathlon at the 2026 Asian Games was held on 20 September 2026. The race was consisted of 750 metres (0.47 mi) swimming, 20 kilometres (12 mi) road bicycle racing, and 5 kilometres (3.1 mi) road running.

== Schedule ==
All times are Japan Standard Time (UTC+09:00)

Date	Time	Event
Sunday, 20 September 2023	08:30	Final

== Results ==
Legend

- LAP — Lapped

Rank	Athlete	Swim 750 m	Trans. 1	Bike 20 km	Trans. 2	Run 5 km	Total time
1st place, gold medalist(s)	Takumi Hojo (JPN)	8:55	0:35	28:20	0:15	14:51	52:56
2nd place, silver medalist(s)	Zhang Xirui (CHN)	8:57	0:35	28:17	0:16	15:00	53:05
3rd place, bronze medalist(s)	Arlan Zhanabay (KAZ)	9:03	0:33	28:15	0:19	15:01	53:11
4	Jeremy Quindos (UZB)	8:56	0:35	28:20	0:17	15:08	53:16
5	Fan Junjie (CHN)	8:55	0:34	28:21	0:18	15:21	53:29
6	Robin Elg (HKG)	8:53	0:38	28:18	0:26	15:26	53:41
7	Oscar Coggins (HKG)	8:58	0:36	28:15	0:15	15:51	53:55
8	Aoba Yasumatsu (JPN)	8:57	0:35	28:17	0:14	16:08	54:11
9	Ayan Beisenbayev (KAZ)	9:08	0:36	28:50	0:18	16:04	54:56
10	Fernando Casares (PHI)	9:49	0:37	28:06	0:18	16:08	54:58
11	Rashif Amila Yaqin (INA)	9:12	0:36	28:49	0:24	16:08	55:09
12	Park Sang-min (KOR)	8:50	0:37	28:23	0:15	17:15	55:20
13	Tey Yi Jun (SGP)	9:39	0:35	28:22	0:16	17:02	55:54
14	Adoh Doherty (LBN)	9:35	0:39	28:24	0:19	17:01	55:58
15	Kim Tae-gi (KOR)	9:20	0:38	28:36	0:17	17:25	56:16
16	Muhammad Noval Ashidiq (INA)	9:10	0:38	28:50	0:19	17:38	56:35
17	Luke Chua Chua Li Rong (SGP)	9:32	0:38	28:26	0:18	17:43	56:37
18	Inaki Lorbes (PHI)	9:38	0:39	28:20	0:18	17:49	56:44
19	Omar Ali (BRN)	9:42	0:40	29:26	0:20	16:42	56:50
20	Aleksandr Kurishov (UZB)	8:50	0:40	28:25	0:21	18:53	57:09
21	Farid Hadipour (IRI)	9:45	0:39	29:22	0:21	17:15	57:22
22	Abdelrahman Tantish (PLE)	9:47	0:35	29:24	0:17	18:21	58:24
23	Kritsanaphon Phonphai (THA)	9:45	0:39	29:25	0:25	18:45	58:59
24	Lao Cheok Hei (MAC)	10:22	0:42	31:14	0:24	19:15	1:01:57
25	Chan Chon Ip (MAC)	10:50	0:41	31:36	0:28	18:33	1:02:08
26	Yousuf Alhanaee (UAE)	10:10	0:42	31:27	0:22	19:55	1:02:36
27	Temirlan Abdrakhimov (KGZ)	9:51	0:37	31:50	0:18	20:26	1:03:02
28	Pattarapoom Onsuwan (THA)	10:20	0:42	31:18	0:21	20:43	1:03:24
29	Adamkhan Arturovich Salamatov (KGZ)	10:45	0:43	32:04	0:24	20:18	1:04:14
—	Amarsanaa Ganbaatar (MGL)	11:55	0:47				LAP
—	Wais Khairandesh (AFG)	12:52	0:48				LAP
—	Mohid Sadiq Lone (PAK)	10:43	1:25				LAP
—	Ali Hassan (PAK)	20:11					LAP
