= Triathlon at the 2026 Asian Games – Women's individual =

Women's individual at the 2026 Asian Games
- Venue: Gamagōri City Triathlon Venue
- Date: 20 September 2026
- Competitors: 28 from 16 nations

Medalists
gold medal	Lin Xinyu	China
silver medal	Huang Anqi	China
bronze medal	Manami Hayashi	Japan

The women's triathlon at the 2026 Asian Games was held on 20 September 2026. The race was consisted of 750 metres (0.47 mi) swimming, 20 kilometres (12 mi) road bicycle racing, and 5 kilometres (3.1 mi) road running.

== Schedule ==
All times are Japan Standard Time (UTC+09:00)

Date	Time	Event
Sunday, 20 September 2023	11:00	Final

== Results ==
Legend

- LAP — Lapped
- DNF — Did not finish

Rank	Athlete	Swim 750 m	Trans. 1	Bike 20 km	Trans. 2	Run 5 km	Total time
1st place, gold medalist(s)	Lin Xinyu (CHN)	9:42	0:36	30:26	0:17	16:36	57:37
2nd place, silver medalist(s)	Huang Anqi (CHN)	9:54	0:36	30:16	0:20	16:52	57:58
3rd place, bronze medalist(s)	Manami Hayashi (JPN)	9:52	0:42	30:11	0:16	17:35	58:36
4	Martina Ayu Pratiwi (INA)	10:02	0:39	30:04	0:16	17:58	58:59
5	Mako Hiraizumi (JPN)	9:59	0:37	30:08	0:17	18:00	59:01
6	Jeong Hyerim (KOR)	9:53	0:38	30:14	0:20	18:19	59:24
7	Margot Garabedian (CAM)	9:45	0:38	30:24	0:19	18:37	59:43
8	Bailee Brown (HKG)	9:58	0:40	30:07	0:20	18:45	59:50
9	Raven Alcoseba (PHI)	9:57	0:42	30:07	0:20	19:01	1:00:07
10	Tallulah Wright (HKG)	10:05	0:39	30:03	0:22	19:22	1:00:31
11	Kim Hye-rang (KOR)	10:01	0:41	32:11	0:20	18:37	1:01:50
12	Alina Khakimova (UZB)	10:20	0:42	31:51	0:21	18:50	1:02:04
13	Hoi Long (MAC)	10:15	0:41	32:00	0:18	19:14	1:02:28
14	Kayla Nadia Shafa (INA)	10:18	0:41	31:59	0:20	19:24	1:02:42
15	Kathlyn Yeo (SGP)	10:21	0:44	31:51	0:25	19:51	1:03:12
16	Lydia Musleh (JOR)	10:05	0:41	32:11	0:24	20:18	1:03:39
17	Diana Yerzhanova (KAZ)	10:46	0:43	33:39	0:20	18:45	1:04:13
18	Herlene Yu (SGP)	10:14	0:45	31:57	0:27	21:50	1:05:13
19	Cheng Wan U (MAC)	10:55	0:49	33:25	0:21	21:09	1:06:39
20	Kim Mangrobang (PHI)	10:56	0:44	33:29	0:22	21:52	1:07:23
21	Suchaya Leenakul (THA)	10:16	0:47	34:08	0:27	23:30	1:09:08
22	Angelina Blindul (KGZ)	12:26	0:45	34:10	0:27	22:31	1:10:19
23	Pichayanat Kittivorakij (THA)	10:12	0:50	36:33	0:26	23:15	1:11:16
—	Anna Kramarenko (KGZ)	12:29	0:49				LAP
—	Tsog Ayas (MGL)	13:20	1:06				LAP
—	Diana Biktimirova (UZB)	10:10	0:48				DNF
—	Nomuunaa Ganbaatar (MGL)	10:46	1:08				DNF
—	Sana Arif (PAK)	17:34	1:14				LAP
