= Yemen at the 2026 Asian Games =

- IOC code: YEM
- NOC: Yemen Olympic Committee

in Aichi–Nagoya, Japan September 19 – October 4, 2026
- Competitors: 17 in 9 sports
- Medals: Gold 0 Silver 0 Bronze 0 Total 0

Asian Games appearances (overview)
- 1990; 1994; 1998; 2002; 2006; 2010; 2014; 2018; 2022; 2026

Other related appearances
- North Yemen (1982, 1986); South Yemen (1982)

Yemen is scheduled to compete at the 2026 Asian Games in Aichi Prefecture and Nagoya, Japan from September 19 to October 4, 2026.

== Competitors ==
The following is a list of the number of competitors representing Yemen that will participate at the Asian Games:

Sport	Men	Women	Total
Archery	1	1	2
Athletics	2	0	2
Boxing	1	0	1
Judo	1	0	1
Shooting	0	2	2
Swimming	2	0	2
Table tennis	3	0	3
Tennis	1	0	1
Wushu	3	0	3
Total	14	3	17

== Archery ==
Athlete	Event	Ranking round		Round of 48	Round of 32	Round of 16	Quarterfinals	Semifinals	Final / BM	
Athlete	Event	Score	Seed	Opposition Score	Opposition Score	Opposition Score	Opposition Score	Opposition Score	Opposition Score	Rank
Nasr Alsayaghi	Men's individual recurve	507	56	Boborajabov (UZB); L 0–6	Did not advance					
Maram Noaman	Women's individual compound	DNS	—	Did not advance						

== Athletics ==
Key

- Note–Ranks given for track events are within the athlete's heat only
- Q = Qualified for the next round
- q = Qualified for the next round as a fastest loser or, in field events, by position without achieving the qualifying target
- NR = National record
- N/A = Round not applicable for the event
- Bye = Athlete not required to compete in round

Track events

Athlete	Event	Heat		Semifinal		Final	
Athlete	Event	Result	Rank	Result	Rank	Result	Rank
Abobakr Baghoot	Men's 100 m	10.93	6	Did not advance			
Abobakr Baghoot	Men's 200 m	22.32 PB	6	Did not advance			
Abdullah Alhaswali	Men's 1500 m	3:48.91	8	—N/a		Did not advance	
Abdullah Alhaswali	Men's 5000 m	—N/a				14:29.57 SB	12

== Boxing ==
Athlete	Event	Round of 32	Round of 16	Quarterfinals	Semifinals	Final	
Athlete	Event	Opposition Result	Opposition Result	Opposition Result	Opposition Result	Opposition Result	Rank
Mustafa Saeed	Men's 70 kg	L 1-4	Did not advance				

== Judo ==
Athlete	Event	Round of 32	Round of 16	Quarterfinals	Semifinals	Repechage	Final / BM	
Athlete	Event	Opposition Result	Opposition Result	Opposition Result	Opposition Result	Opposition Result	Opposition Result	Rank
Hesham Makabr	Men's –66 kg	Rahman (INA); L 000–110	Did not advance					

== Shooting ==
Athlete	Event	Qualification		Final	
Athlete	Event	Points	Rank	Points	Rank
Ahlam Alnaggar	Women's 10 m air pistol	547	51	Did not advance	
Yasameen Al-Raimi	Women's 10 m air pistol	548	49	Did not advance	

== Swimming ==
Athlete	Event	Heat		Final	
Athlete	Event	Time	Rank	Time	Rank
Abdullah Barakat	Men's 50 m freestyle	28.25	47	Did not advance	
Abdullah Barakat	Men's 50 m butterfly	29.97	43	Did not advance	
Yusuf Nasser	Men's 50 m freestyle	27.13	45	Did not advance	
Yusuf Nasser	Men's 50 m butterfly	28.57	41	Did not advance	

== Table tennis ==
Men

Athlete	Event	Round of 64	Round of 32	Round of 16	Quarterfinal	Semifinal	Final / BM	
Athlete	Event	Opposition Result	Opposition Result	Opposition Result	Opposition Result	Opposition Result	Opposition Result	Rank
Ebrahim Gubran	Singles	Kapali (NEP); W 4–1	Kurmangaliev (KAZ); L 0-4	Did not advance				
Magd Aldhubhani	Singles	Kasymov (KGZ); W 4–3	Chan (HKG); L 0–4	Did not advance				
Ebrahim Gubran; Magd Aldhubhani	Doubles	Bye	Xiang / Wen (CHN); L 0-3	Did not advance				

Team

Team	Event	Group stage			Round of 16	Quarter-finals	Semi-finals	Final	
Team	Event	Opposition Score	Opposition Score	Rank	Opposition Score	Opposition Score	Opposition Score	Opposition Score	Rank
Abdulrahman Alyafaee; Ebrahim Gubran; Magd Aldhubhani	Men	South Korea (KOR); L 0–3	Mongolia (MGL); L 1–3	3	Did not advance				

== Tennis ==
Athlete	Event	Round of 64	Round of 32	Round of 16	Quarterfinals	Semifinals	Final	
Athlete	Event	Opposition Score	Opposition Score	Opposition Score	Opposition Score	Opposition Score	Opposition Score	Rank
Fares Alwazer	Men's singles	Bye	Watanuki (JPN); 0–2	Did not advance				

== Wushu ==
=== Taolu ===
Athlete	Event	Event 1		Event 2		Total	Rank
Athlete	Event	Result	Rank	Result	Rank	Total	Rank
Mugahed Mohammed	Men's changquan	9.083	20	—N/a		9.083	20
Bassam Lwza	Men's nanquan & nangun	8.843	17	8.283	18	17.126	18

=== Sanda ===
Athlete	Event	Round of 16	Quarter-finals	Semi-finals	Final	
Athlete	Event	Opposition Score	Opposition Score	Opposition Score	Opposition Score	Rank
Mohammed Amer	Men's –70 kg	Hotak (AFG); L 0–2	Did not advance			
