= Hong Kong at the 2026 Asian Games =

- IOC code: HKG
- NOC: Sports Federation and Olympic Committee of Hong Kong, China external link (in Chinese and English)

in Aichi Prefecture and Nagoya, Japan 19 September 2026 – 4 October 2026
- Competitors: 581 in 42 sports
- Medals Ranked 9th: Gold 11 Silver 19 Bronze 24 Total 54

Asian Games appearances (overview)
- 1954; 1958; 1962; 1966; 1970; 1974; 1978; 1982; 1986; 1990; 1994; 1998; 2002; 2006; 2010; 2014; 2018; 2022; 2026

Hong Kong competed at the 2026 Asian Games in Nagoya, Aichi Prefecture, Japan, from 19 September to 4 October 2026.

== Competitors ==
The following is a list of the number of competitors representing Hong Kong who participated at the Asian Games:

Sport	Men	Women	Total
3x3 basketball	4	0	4
Archery	1	3	4
Artistic swimming	0	10	10
Athletics	18	20	38
Badminton	10	10	20
Baseball	24	0	24
Basketball	0	12	12
Beach volleyball	4	4	8
Breaking	1	0	1
Canoeing	4	0	4
Cricket	15	0	15
Cycling	13	12	25
Diving	2	2	4
Equestrian	2	7	9
Esports	40	3	43
Fencing	12	12	24
Football	23	23	46
Golf	3	3	6
Gymnastics	3	5	8
Handball	16	16	32
Judo	3	3	6
Karate	5	3	8
Modern pentathlon	1	1	2
Padel	4	4	8
Rowing	10	9	19
Rugby sevens	13	13	26
Sailing	8	8	16
Shooting	1	1	2
Skateboarding	2	3	5
Softball	0	17	17
Sport climbing	4	4	8
Squash	4	4	8
Swimming	19	15	34
Table tennis	5	5	10
Taewondo	2	4	6
Tennis	6	6	12
Triathlon	3	3	6
Volleyball	12	12	24
Water polo	15	0	15
Weightlifting	1	1	2
Wrestling	2	0	2
Wushu	6	4	10
Total	321	260	581

== Medal table ==
=== Medal distribution by competition day ===
Competition day	Date	Rank	Gold	Silver	Bronze	Total
Day 1	September 20	10	0	2	0	2
Day 2	September 21	6	2	1	3	6
Day 3	September 22	6	1	2	1	4
Day 4	September 23	6	0	1	3	4
Day 5	September 24	8	1	4	2	7
Day 6	September 25	8	0	1	2	3
Day 7	September 26	11	0	0	3	3
Day 8	September 27	11	1	1	1	3
Day 9	September 28	11	0	0	2	2
Day 10	September 29	12	0	0	1	1
Day 11	September 30	12	0	0	0	0
Day 12	October 1	12	0	3	2	5
Day 13	October 2	11	2	2	2	6
Day 14	October 3	9	4	2	2	8
Day 15	October 4	9	0	0	0	0
Total		9	11	19	24	54

=== Medals by sport ===
Medals by sport
Sport	Gold	Silver	Bronze	Total
Sailing	4	4	2	10
Swimming	2	3	1	6
Squash	1	2	2	5
Rowing	1	2	1	4
Wushu	1	2	1	4
Rugby sevens	1	0	1	2
Tennis	1	0	1	2
Fencing	0	2	4	6
Karate	0	2	3	5
Cycling	0	2	3	5
Esports	0	0	2	2
Gymnastics	0	0	1	1
Table tennis	0	0	1	1
Triathlon	0	0	1	1
Total	11	19	24	54

=== Medalists ===
Medal	Athlete	Sport	Event	Date
Gold	Sham Hui Yu Lydia	Wushu	Women's changquan	September 21
Gold	Siobhan Haughey	Swimming	Women's 200m freestyle	September 21
Gold	Siobhan Haughey	Swimming	Women's 100m freestyle	September 22
Gold	Chiu Hin Chun	Rowing	Lightweight Men’s single sculls	September 24
Gold	Lee Ka Yi; Tang Ming Hong	Squash	Mixed doubles	September 27
Gold	Louis Polson; Ethan Kiu	Sailing	Boy’s skiff: 29er	October 2
Gold	Chloe Kong; McCarley Wong	Sailing	Girl’s skiff: 29er	October 2
Gold	Coleman Wong	Tennis	Men's single	October 3
Gold	Wong Tsz Ho	Sailing	Boy’s windsurfing: iQFOiL	October 3
Gold	Cheung Tsz Yuet	Sailing	Girl's windsurfing: iQFOiL	October 3
Gold	Callum Mccullough; Juan Esono Mba Oyana; Alessandro Nardoni; James Christie; Harry Sayers; Cado Lee; Matthew Rickard; Max Denmark; Dafydd Phillips; Julien Bourron; Rory Murdoch Stewart Cox; Matteo Avitabile; Liam Herbert	Rugby Sevens	Men's tournament	October 3
Silver	Grace Lau	Karate	Women's individual kata	September 20
Silver	Wang Xintong; Ma Gilaine; Li Sum Yiu; Kan Cheuk Tung Natalie; Siobhan Haughey	Swimming	Women's 4×100 m freestyle relay	September 20
Silver	Ho Yentou Ian	Swimming	Men’s 50m freestyle	September 21
Silver	Lau Tsz Lung	Wushu	Men’s nanquan and nangun	September 22
Silver	Choi Chun Yin Ryan	Fencing	Men’s individual foil	September 22
Silver	Tsang Yee Ting	Karate	Women's Kumite -50kg	September 23
Silver	Hung Wing Yan Winne	Rowing	Lightweight Women’s single sculls	September 24
Silver	Cheung Yuen Shan; Leung Wing Wun	Rowing	Lightweight Women’s double sculls	September 24
Silver	Leung Yu Hong	Wushu	Men’s sanda -60kg	September 24
Silver	Siobhan Haughey	Swimming	Women’s 50m freestyle	September 24
Silver	Cheung Ka Long; Choi Chun Yin Ryan; Ho Shing Him Harris; Leung Chin Yu	Fencing	Men's team foil	September 25
Silver	Tse Yee Lam Toby; Lai Cheuk Nam	Squash	Mixed doubles	September 27
Silver	Emily Grace Polson; Tiffany Mak	Sailing	Women's skiff: 49erFX	October 1
Silver	Lee Sze Wing; Leung Wing Yee	Track Cycling	Women's madison	October 1
Silver	Chu Tsun Wai	Track Cycling	Men's omnium	October 1
Silver	Nicholas Halliday	Sailing	Men’s Dinghy: ILCA7	October 2
Silver	Chan Sin Yuk; Ho Tsz Lok; Lee Ka Yi; Tse Yee Lam Toby	Squash	Women's team	October 2
Silver	Ma Kwan Ching	Sailing	Women's windsurfing: iQFOiL	October 3
Silver	Huang Zixi	Sailing	Girl's Dinghy: ILCA4	October 3
Bronze	Cade Wright; Bailee Brown; Oscar Coggins; Robin Elg	Triathlon	Mixed relay	September 21
Bronze	Hung Ho Wai Howard	Karate	Men’s individual kata	September 21
Bronze	Wong Cheuk Lee	Karate	Women's Kumite -68kg	September 21
Bronze	Leung Wing Yee	Road Cycling	Women's road race	September 22
Bronze	Hung Ho Wai Howard; Li Chi Kong; Tang Yu Hin	Karate	Men’s Team kata	September 23
Bronze	Kan Cheuk Tung Natalie	Swimming	Women's 100m butterfly	September 23
Bronze	Chan Tsz Ching	Wushu	Women's sanda -52kg	September 23
Bronze	Lam San Tung; Chan Tik Lun	Rowing	Lightweight Men’s double sculls	September 24
Bronze	Fong Hoi Sun	Fencing	Men’s individual epee	September 24
Bronze	Ng Ka Ki	Gymnastics	Men's vault	September 25
Bronze	Wong Yuk Cheung; Yeh Man Ho; Li Hin Hei	Esports	Fighting Games (Street Fighter 6, TEKKEN 8, THE KING OF FIGHTERS XV)	September 25
Bronze	Cheng Hiu Wai Valerie; Chan Nok Sze Daphne; Leung Ya Lei Janelle; Wu Sophia	Fencing	Women's team foil	September 26
Bronze	Chan Lok Hei Royce; Ho Pak Lam Hugo; Ho Sze Long Aaron; Leung Tin Ching	Fencing	Men's team sabre	September 26
Bronze	Chan Sin Yuk	Squash	Women's single	September 26
Bronze	Fong Hoi Sun; Ho Wai Hang; Ng Ho Tin; Lau Ho Fung	Fencing	Men's team epee	September 27
Bronze	Cheng Ka Hin; Kwok Ho Wa; Kong Tsz Kin; Li Ka Hing; Deng Xing Zhan; Chui Sum Ki	Esports	Honor of Kings	September 28
Bronze	Doo Hoi Kem; Ng Wing Lam	Table tennis	Women's double	September 28
Bronze	Mok Tsz Chun; To Cheuk Hei; Yung Tsun Ho	Track Cycling	Men's team sprint	September 29
Bronze	Akira Luke Sakai; Russell Williams Aylsworth	Sailing	Men's skiff: 49er	October 1
Bronze	Leung Tsz Hin Henry; Lau Tsz Kwan; Lai Cheuk Nam; Tang Ming Hong	Squash	Men's team	October 1
Bronze	Eudice Chong; Wong Hong Yi	Tennis	Women's doubles	October 2
Bronze	Lee Sze Wing	Track Cycling	Women's omnium	October 2
Bronze	Tiago Cheng de Villemor Salgado	Sailing	Boy’s dinghy: ILCA4	October 3
Bronze	Shanna Forrest; Chan Chloe; Au Yeung Sin Yi; Julia Mba Oyana; Nam Ka Yan; Natasha Olson; Chan Tsz Ching; Jessica Ho; Au King To; Stephanie Chan; Chong Ka Yan; Emrin Baltazar; Gabriella Rivers	Rugby Sevens	Women's tournament	October 3

== Aquatics ==
=== Swimming ===
==== Men ====
Event	Athlete	Heats		Final	
Event	Athlete	Time	Rank	Time	Rank
50 m freestyle	Ho Ian Yentou	22.24	4 Q	21.76	2nd place, silver medalist(s)
50 m freestyle	Hofstede Adam Marcel	22.27	6 Q	22.33	9
100 m freestyle	Ho Ian Yentou	52.76	29	Did not advance	
100 m freestyle	Wan Chun Lim	51.20	24	Did not advance	
200 m freestyle	Lo Tsz Lam	1:51:14	16	Did not advance	
200 m freestyle	Kwan Nicholas	1:53:55	24	Did not advance	
400 m freestyle	Lai King-wo	4:02.98	22	Did not advance	
400 m freestyle	Wang Yi Shun	4:07.72	26	Did not advance	
800 m freestyle	Wang Yi Shun	—N/a		8:43.16	20
800 m freestyle	Chen Eric Q	—N/a		8:09.28	13
1500 m freestyle	Chen Eric Q	—N/a		15:47:74	15
1500 m freestyle	Wang Yi Shun	—N/a		16:58:28	19
50 m backstroke	Chan Tsz Chiu	26.35	16	Did not advance	
50 m backstroke	Yu Dongqi	26.40	17	Did not advance	
100 m backstroke	Kwan Hayden	55.46	9 Q	55.11	7
100 m backstroke	Chan Tsz Chiu	57.35	20	Did not advance	
200 m backstroke	Kwan Hayden	2:01.39	6 Q	2:01.00	8
200 m backstroke	Chan Tsz Chiu	2:06.07	17	Did not advance	
50 m breaststroke	Mak Sai Ting Adam	27.71	7 Q	27.77	7
50 m breaststroke	Tsui Yik Ki	27.86	11 R	Did not advance	
100 m breaststroke	Cheung Chi Kit Nicholas	1:00.46	7 Q	1:00.67	9
100 m breaststroke	Mak Sai Ting Adam	1:00.25	5 Q	1:00.22	6
200 m breaststroke	Mak Sai Ting Adam	2:11.69	5 Q	2:08.77	4
200 m breaststroke	Adam Chillingworth	2:13.05	9 Q	2:11.27	8
50 m butterfly	Hofstede Adam Marcel	24.40	17	Did not advance	
50 m butterfly	Li Sing Hoi	24.30	16	Did not advance	
100 m butterfly	Koo Ralph Yat Ho	55:20	21	Did not advance	
100 m butterfly	Ho Ian Yentou	52:78	11 R	Did not advance	
200 m butterfly	Lau Kin Hei	2:18.78	23	Did not advance	
200 m butterfly	Ho Chung Lun	2:01.84	10 Q	2:02.15	10
200 m individual medley	Lo Tsz Lam	2:03.93	15	Did not advance	
200 m individual medley	Yu Dongqi	2:06.15	19	Did not advance	
400 m individual medley	Lo Tsz Lam	4:33:14	17	Did not advance	
400 m individual medley	Wang Yi Shun	4:29:17	14	Did not advance	
4×100 m freestyle relay	Lo Tsz Lam; Ho Ian Yentou; Li Sing Hoi; Wan Chun Lim; Yu Dongqi	3:21.76	9	Did not advance	
4×200 m freestyle relay	Kwan Hayden; Wan Chun Lim; Kwan Tsz Po; Lai King Wo; Lo Tsz Lam; Wang Yi Shun	7:30.83	11	Did not advance	
4×100 m medley relay	Cheung Chi Kit Nicholas; Koo Ralph Yat Ho; Kwan Hayden; Wan Chun Lim	3:41:76	9	Did not advance	

==== Women's events ====
Event	Athlete	Heats		Final	
Event	Athlete	Time	Rank	Time	Rank
50 m freestyle	Siobhan Haughey	24.70	2 Q	24.32	2nd place, silver medalist(s)
50 m freestyle	Lee Sum-yiu	25.31	7 Q	25.11	6
100 m freestyle	Siobhan Haughey	53.60	1 Q	52.45	1st place, gold medalist(s)
100 m freestyle	Lee Sum-yiu	55.58	7 Q	55.45	7
200 m freestyle	Siobhan Haughey	1:58.60	2 Q	1:54.96	1st place, gold medalist(s)
200 m freestyle	Ma Tsz-ling	2:00.57	3 Q	1:59.75	5
400 m freestyle	Ma Tsz-ling	4:18.23	7 Q	1:59.75	5
400 m freestyle	Wang Hsin-tung	4:23.09	11 R	Did not advance	
800 m freestyle	Ko Ka-lin	—N/a		8:57.77	8
800 m freestyle	Ma Tsz-ling	—N/a		8:55.63	7
1500 m freestyle	Lam Pak-tung	—N/a		17:25.17	8
1500 m freestyle	Ma Tsz-ling	—N/a		17:37.48	9
50 m backstroke	Chan Tsz-yu	29.18	11 R	Did not advance	
50 m backstroke	Ng Lai-wah	29.96	17	Did not advance	
100 m backstroke	Cheung Sum-yuet	1:01.37	8 Q	1:01.52	8
100 m backstroke	Chan Tsz-yu	1:03.05	12 R	Did not advance	
200 m backstroke	Cheung Sum-yuet	2:12.54	5 Q	2:12.06	5
200 m backstroke	Chan Tsz-yu	2:20.89	16	Did not advance	
50 m breaststroke	Man Wai-kiu	32.53	12 R	Did not advance	
100 m breaststroke	Man Wai-kiu	1:10.48	12 R	Did not advance	
100 m breaststroke	Lam Wan-ching	1:09.27	6 Q	1:08.42	6
200 m breaststroke	Ko Ka-lin	2:33.24	8 Q	2:35.35	9
200 m breaststroke	Lam Wan-ching	2:33.32	9 Q	2:30.50	6
50 m butterfly	Kan Cheuk-tung	26.28	4 Q	26.11	4
50 m butterfly	Yeung Hoi-ching	27.39	11 R	27.55	10
100 m butterfly	Yeung Hoi-ching	1:00.73	10 Q	1:00.55	9
100 m butterfly	Kan Cheuk-tung	58.34	2 Q	58.05	3rd place, bronze medalist(s)
200 m butterfly	Yeung Hoi-ching	2:15.18	10 Q	2:14.11	9
200 m butterfly	Man Suet-yi	2:17.84	12 R	Did not advance	
200 m individual medley	Man Wai-kiu	2:20.63	14	Did not advance	
200 m individual medley	Wang Hsin-tung	2:19.15	11 R	Did not advance	
400 m individual medley	Ko Ka-lin	4:56.22	10 Q	4:50.27	7
400 m individual medley	Ng Lai-wah	5:06.72	11 R	Did not advance	
4×100 m freestyle relay	Wang Hsin-tung; Lee Sum-yiu; Kan Cheuk-tung; Ma Tsz-ling; Siobhan Haughey	3:45.39	4 Q	3:36.59	2nd place, silver medalist(s)
4×200 m freestyle relay	Ma Tsz-ling; Wang Hsin-tung; Man Wai-kiu; Ko Ka-lin	8:20.93	5 Q	8:12.47	4
4×100 m medley relay	Cheung Sum-yuet; Man Wai-kiu; Yeung Hoi-ching; Ma Tsz-ling; Lam Wan-ching	4:10.62	5 Q	4:06.27	5

==== Mixed events ====
Event	Athlete	Heats		Final	
Event	Athlete	Time	Rank	Time	Rank
4×100 m medley relay	Kwan Hayden; Cheung Chi Kit Nicholas; Yeung Hoi-ching; Ma Tsz-ling	3:52.27	3 Q	3:52.47	5

==== Water polo ====
Event	Group stage				Quarter-finals	Semi-finals / Pl.	Final / BM / Pl.	
Event	Opponent Score	Opponent Score	Opponent Score	Rank	Opponent Score	Opponent Score	Opponent Score	Rank
Men's event	Thailand; W 24–15	Kazakhstan; L 15–29	Japan; L 6–30	3 Q	Iran; L 12–21	Singapore; W 15–11	South Korea; L 15–16	6

== Athletics ==
=== Men's events ===
Field events

Event	Athlete	Qualification		Final	
Event	Athlete	Result	Rank	Result	Rank
High jump	Michael Kennelly	—N/a		2.05	=10
High jump	Ho Ho Wai	—N/a		2.05	=10
Long jump	Wong Pak Hang	7.28	13	Did not advance	
Long jump	Lam Ming Fu	7.53	9 q	7.55	8

Track events

Event	Athlete	Qualification		Semifinal		Final	
Event	Athlete	Result	Rank	Result	Rank	Result	Rank
100 m	Cheung Ho Hin	10.67	4	Did not advance			
200 m	Yip King Wai	21.13	3 Q	20.74	3 q	21.22	8
200 m	Magnus Johannsson	21.19	3 Q	21.18	5	Did not advance	
400 m	Chan Chun Ho	46.55	6	—N/a		Did not advance	
800 m	Kamran Khan	1:50.31	5	—N/a		Did not advance	
110 m hurdles	Cheung Wang Fung	13.88	5	—N/a		Did not advance	
110 m hurdles	Liu Hiu Long	13.91	4	—N/a		Did not advance	
400 m hurdles	Chan Chun Ho	50.70	4	—N/a		Did not advance	
400 m hurdles	Chung Long Hei	53.38	6	—N/a		Did not advance	
4×100 m relay	Chan Yat Lok; Chung Tsz Sing; Kwok Chun Ting; Li Hong Kit	39.48	6	—N/a		Did not advance	
Marathon	Vincent Leslie Lam	—N/a				2:22:04	15
20 km race walk	Chin Man Kit	—N/a				1:34.26	5

=== Women's events ===
Field events

Event	Athlete	Final	
Event	Athlete	Result	Rank
High jump	Chung Wai Yan	1.75	10
High jump	Cheung Ching Nam	1.75	13
Long jump	Yu Nga Yan	6.05	9
Long jump	Ka Wai Yan	5.79	14

Track events

Event	Athlete	Qualification		Semifinal		Final	
Event	Athlete	Result	Rank	Result	Rank	Result	Rank
100 m	Chan Pui Ki	11.83	4 q	11.86	8	Did not advance	
100 m	Yu Pui Yi	11.93	5	Did not advance			
200 m	Yau Sin Ting	24.32	7	—N/a		Did not advance	
400 m	Chau Tsz Kiu	55.80	5	—N/a		Did not advance	
100 m hurdles	Lau Tsz Yan	14.14	6	—N/a		Did not advance	
100 m hurdles	Shing Chor Yan	13.86	4 q	—N/a		13.95	8
400 m hurdles	Ma Wing Man	1:03.88	6	—N/a		Did not advance	
4×100 m relay	Chan Pui Ki; Yu Pui Yi; Leung Wan Yee; Lo Tsz Yuen; Pak Hoi Man; Wong Wan Chi	DQ	—	—N/a		Did not advance	
4×400 m relay	Chau Tsz Kiu; Cai Siu Chan; Tsui Wing Yan; Poon Hang Wai	—N/a				3:43.86	9
Marathon	Lo Ying Chiu	—N/a				2:40:46	11
Marathon	Wong Cheuk Ning	—N/a				2:42:33	13

=== Mixed event ===
Event	Athlete	Qualification		Semifinal		Final	
Event	Athlete	Result	Rank	Result	Rank	Result	Rank
Mixed 4×100 m relay	Cheung Ho Hin; Li Hong Kit; Pak Hoi Man; Wong Wan Chi	DQ	—	—N/a		Did not advance	

== Badminton ==
Men

Athlete	Event	Round of 64	Round of 32	Round of 16	Quarter-finals	Semi-finals	Final	
Athlete	Event	Opposition Score	Opposition Score	Opposition Score	Opposition Score	Opposition Score	Opposition Score	Rank
Lee Cheuk Yiu	Singles	Bye	Naraoka (JPN); L 17–21, 21–11, 18–21	Did not advance				
Ng Ka Long	Singles	Bye	Abeywickrama (SRI); W 21–5, 21–11	Choi (KOR); W 18–21, 21–14, 3–1 retired	Vitidsarn (THA); L 21–16, 10–21, 13–21	Did not advance		
Cheung Sai Shing; Deng Chi Fai	Doubles	—N/a	Pui C C / Pui P F (MAC); W 21–12, 21–14	Alfian / Fikri (INA); L 10–21, 17–21	Did not advance			
Hung Kuei Chun; Lui Chun Wai	Doubles	—N/a	Kumagai / Nishi (JPN); L 19–21, 21–19, 12–21	Did not advance				
Jason Gunawan; Lee Cheuk Yiu; Law Cheuk Him; Lui Chun Wai; Lam Ka To; Yeung Shing Choi; Chan Yin Chak; Cheung Sai Shing; Deng Chi Fai; Hung Kuei Chun	Team	—N/a		South Korea (KOR); L 1–3	Did not advance			

Women

Athlete	Event	Round of 64	Round of 32	Round of 16	Quarter-finals	Semi-finals	Final	
Athlete	Event	Opposition Score	Opposition Score	Opposition Score	Opposition Score	Opposition Score	Opposition Score	Rank
Liang Ka Wing	Singles	Bye	Chen (CHN); L 11–21, 15–21	Did not advance				
Lo Sin Yan	Singles	Bye	A N Abdul Razzaq (MDV); W 21–2, 21–12	Lin (TPE); L 19–21, 21–7, 15–21	Did not advance			
Lui Lok Lok; Tsang Hiu Yan	Doubles	—N/a	Gopichand / Jolly (IND); L 16–21, 21–16, 16–21	Did not advance				
Yeung Nga Ting; Yeung Pui Lam	Doubles	—N/a	Ng / Pui (MAC); W 21–9, 21–10	Aimsaard / Sudjaipraparat (THA); W 11–21, 22–20, 21–19	Nakanishi / Uesaka (JPN); L 15–21, 21–19, 15–21	Did not advance		
Liang Ka Wing; Lo Sin Yan; Lui Lok Lok; Tsang Hiu Yan; Saloni Mehta; Ng Tsz Yau; Tse Ying Suet; Wong Yi; Yeung Nga Ting; Yeung Pui Lam	Team	—N/a		Malaysia (MAS); L 0–3	Did not advance			

Mixed

Athlete	Event	Round of 32	Round of 16	Quarter-finals	Semi-finals	Final	
Athlete	Event	Opposition Score	Opposition Score	Opposition Score	Opposition Score	Opposition Score	Rank
Chan Yin Chak; Ng Tsz Yau	Doubles	Leong / Ng (MAC); W 21–8, 21–13	Jiang / Wei (CHN); L 21–16, 19–21, 15–21	Did not advance			
Lui Chun Wai; Tse Ying Suet	Doubles	B Odbayar / A Odbayar (MGL); W 21–5, 21–5	Feng / Huang (CHN); L 10–21, 9–21	Did not advance			

== Baseball ==
Team	Event	Preliminary round				Super / Consolation Round			Final / BM	
Team	Event	Opposition Score	Opposition Score	Opposition Score	Rank	Opposition Score	Opposition Score	Rank	Opposition Score	Rank
Hong Kong men's	Men's tournament	Thailand; L 7–10	South Korea; L 0–13	Chinese Taipei; L 0–11	4	Palestine; L 2–7	Philippines; W 7–5	3	Did not advance	

== Basketball ==
Summary

Team	Event	Group Stage				Quarter-finals	Semi-finals	Final / BM	
Team	Event	Opposition Score	Opposition Score	Opposition Score	Rank	Opposition Score	Opposition Score	Opposition Score	Rank
Hong Kong women's	Women's 5x5 tournament	Japan; L 37–114	Philippines; L 73–90	Kazakhstan; L 77–80 (OT)	4	Did not advance			10
Hong Kong men's	Men's 3x3 tournament	Malaysia; L 15–18	Iran; L 11–16	China; L 11–21	4	Did not advance			15

=== Women's 5x5 tournament ===
Team roster

- Chiu Ka Yu
- Ng Yan Tung
- Cheung Chor Ying
- Yam Hui Yin
- Tong Hiu Lui
- Kwan Hoi Pui
- Lau Sheung Hok
- Li Tsz Kwan
- Tsui Wing Yu
- Christy Wong
- Wong Nga Ting
- Ma Tan Fung

Preliminary rounds – Group B

Pos	Team	Pld	W	L	PF	PA	PD	Pts	Qualification
1	Japan (H)	3	3	0	291	127	+164	6	Quarterfinals
2	Philippines	3	2	1	243	220	+23	5	Quarterfinals
3	Kazakhstan	3	1	2	161	251	−90	4	
4	Hong Kong	3	0	3	187	284	−97	3	

Source: aichi-nagoya2026.org
(H) Hosts

17 September 2026
19:00

Report
Results

Japan	114–37	Hong Kong
Scoring by quarter: 32–11, 37–6, 20–7, 25–13
Pts: Tateyama 26; Rebs: Okamoto 9 Asts: Higuchi 7		Pts: Kwan 10; Rebs: Tong 5 Asts: Li, Tsui 2

Aichi International Arena, Nagoya
Attendance: 1,549
Referees: Lee Ji-youn (KOR), Mandy Ngieng (MAS), Mahsa Kargari (IRI)

20 September 2026
10:00

Report
Results

Hong Kong	73–90	Philippines
Scoring by quarter: 21–21, 19–25, 20–23, 13–21
Pts: Li 30; Rebs: 3 players 5 Asts: Tsui 9		Pts: Berberabe 21; Rebs: Bernardino 11; Asts: Bernardino 4

Aichi International Arena, Nagoya
Attendance: 7,360
Referees: Lee Ji-youn (KOR), Budi Marfan (INA), Mandy Ngieng (MAS)

22 September 2026
10:00

Report
Results

Kazakhstan	80–77 (OT)	Hong Kong
Scoring by quarter: 12–10, 17–19, 11–14, 25–28, Overtime: 12–9
Pts: Alishauskaite 22; Rebs: Bezgodova 15; Asts: Bezgodova 6		Pts: Li 32; Rebs: Li 9 Asts: Tong, Tsui 6

Aichi International Arena, Nagoya
Attendance: 5,993
Referees: Abdullah Alhejaili (KSA), Mahsa Kargari (IRI), Budi Marfan (INA)

=== Men's 3x3 tournament ===
Preliminary rounds – Group B

Pos	Team	Pld	W	L	PF	PA	PD	Pts	Qualification
1	Iran	3	3	0	55	33	+22	6	Quarterfinals
2	China	3	2	1	58	43	+15	5	Play-ins
3	Malaysia	3	1	2	39	58	−19	4	Play-ins
4	Hong Kong	3	0	3	37	55	−18	3	

Source: asiangames2026.org

22 September
13:15

Report

Malaysia	18–15	Hong Kong
Pts: Te 8		Pts: Wu 9

Kinjō-futō Station Square, Nagoya
Referees: Su Yeyen (TPE), Alexandr Rulyov (KAZ)

22 September
14:55

Report

Iran	16–11	Hong Kong
Pts: Momeni, Rahimi 6		Pts: Chan 7

Kinjō-futō Station Square, Nagoya
Referees: Rina Nozaki (JPN), Neoh Yuen (MAS)

23 September
18:30

Report

China	21–11	Hong Kong
Pts: Liu 9		Pts: Chan, Yang 5

Kinjō-futō Station Square, Nagoya
Referees: Rina Nozaki (JPN), Danusorn Laosaksam (THA)

== Fencing ==
Hong Kong entered 24 athletes into the Games.

== Football ==
Summary

Team	Event	Group stage				Quarterfinal	Semifinal	Final / BM	
Team	Event	Opposition Score	Opposition Score	Opposition Score	Rank	Opposition Score	Opposition Score	Opposition Score	Rank
Hong Kong men's	Men's tournament	Japan; L 0–2	Thailand; L 1–5	Kyrgyzstan; L 0–4	4	Did not advance			15
Hong Kong women's	Women's tournament	China; L 1–5	Philippines; L 0–2	Uzbekistan; L 1–2	4	Did not advance			12

=== Men's tournament ===
Team squads

Hong Kong announced their final squad on 17 July.

Head coach: Tsang Chiu Tat

No.	Pos.	Player	Date of birth (age)	Club
1	GK	Cheung Kwai Wa	2 January 2003 (age 23)	(Football Association of Hong Kong, China) Kowloon City
2	DF	Krisna Korani	2 March 2004 (age 22)	(Football Association of Hong Kong, China) Eastern District
3	DF	Sung Wang Ngai	2 December 2003 (age 22)	(Football Association of Hong Kong, China) Eastern District
4	DF	Tsang Yi Hang	27 October 2003 (age 23)	(Football Association of Hong Kong, China) Lee Man
5	DF	Hélio*	31 January 1986 (age 40)	(Football Association of Hong Kong, China) Eastern District
6	MF	Wu Chun Ming*	21 November 1997 (age 28)	(Football Association of Hong Kong, China) Lee Man
7	MF	Ma Hei Wai	3 February 2004 (age 22)	(Chinese Football Association) Shaanxi Union
8	MF	Ngan Cheuk Pan*	22 January 1998 (age 28)	(Chinese Football Association) Qiangdao Hainiu
9	FW	Michael Udebuluzor	11 April 2004 (age 22)	(Football Association of Hong Kong, China) Lee Man
10	MF	Sohgo Ichikawa	30 July 2004 (age 22)	(Football Association of Hong Kong, China) Lee Man
11	FW	Anthony Pinto	1 December 2006 (age 19)	(The Football Association) Loughborough Students
12	DF	Kwok Chun Nok	6 March 2004 (age 22)	(Football Association of Hong Kong, China) Kowloon City
13	DF	Tsang Lok To	15 July 2005 (age 21)	(United States Soccer Federation) Vermont Catamounts
14	DF	Loong Tsz Hin	8 August 2004 (age 22)	(Football Association of Hong Kong, China) Eastern
15	DF	Yim Kai Cheuk	12 April 2004 (age 22)	(Football Association of Hong Kong, China) Kowloon City
16	FW	Chen Ngo Hin	27 February 2003 (age 23)	(Football Association of Hong Kong, China) Kowloon City
17	FW	Ng Yu Hei	13 February 2006 (age 20)	(Chinese Football Association) Chongqing Tonglianglong
18	GK	Chan Kun Sun	13 August 2004 (age 22)	(Football Association of Hong Kong, China) North District
19	GK	Poon Sheung Hei	29 September 2006 (age 20)	(Football Association of Hong Kong, China) HKFC
20	FW	Matthew Slattery	5 April 2005 (age 21)	(Football Association of Hong Kong, China) Kowloon City
21	FW	Lee Chun Ting	1 June 2005 (age 21)	(Football Association of Hong Kong, China) Eastern
22	MF	Chin Yu Ho	13 February 2008 (age 18)	(Portuguese Football Federation) Oriental
23	FW	Lee Lok Him	18 April 2004 (age 22)	(Football Association of Hong Kong, China) Eastern

* Over-aged player.

Group play

Pos	Team	Pld	W	D	L	GF	GA	GD	Pts	Qualification
1	Japan (H)	3	3	0	0	12	0	+12	9	Advance to knockout stage
2	Thailand	3	2	0	1	8	6	+2	6	Advance to knockout stage
3	Kyrgyzstan	3	1	0	2	6	10	−4	3	
4	Hong Kong	3	0	0	3	1	11	−10	0	

Source: Aichi–Nagoya 26
Rules for classification: Group stage tiebreakers
(H) Hosts
16 September 2026
19:30

Japan	2–0	Hong Kong
Ishii 39'; Nagano 89'	Report

Toyota Stadium, Toyota
Attendance: 7,720
Referee: Tuan Yaasin (Malaysia)

20 September 2026
16:00

Hong Kong	1–5	Thailand
Wu Chun Ming 14'	Report	Thanakrit 39'; Paripan 52'; Tsang Yi Hang 56' (o.g.); Jehhanafee 76'; Worawut 84'

Toyota Stadium, Toyota
Attendance: 10,439
Referee: Hanna Hattab (Syria)

23 September 2026
19:30

Kyrgyzstan	4–0	Hong Kong
Omarov 7'; Madanov 22'; Abduzhaparov 63'; S. Nematov 86'	Report

Wave Stadium Kariya, Kariya
Attendance: 1,187
Referee: Saud Al-Samhan (Kuwait)

=== Women's tournament ===
Team squads

The following players list is the Hong Kong squad for the 2026 Asian Games.

Head Coach: (Brazil) José Ricardo Rambo

No.	Pos.	Player	Date of birth (age)	Club
1	GK	Ng Cheuk Wai	19 March 1997 (age 29)	(Football Association of Hong Kong, China) TSL
18	GK	Lee Yi Yan	15 October 2006 (age 20)	(Football Association of Hong Kong, China) Shatin
19	GK	Li Sze Ying	29 March 2007 (age 19)	(Football Association of Hong Kong, China) Citizen
2	DF	Chu Sin Kwan	24 September 2004 (age 22)	(Football Association of Hong Kong, China) Shatin
3	DF	Ma Chak Shun	2 March 1996 (age 30)	(Football Association of Hong Kong, China) TSL
4	DF	Chu So Kwan	3 March 2004 (age 22)	(Football Association of Hong Kong, China) Kitchee
5	DF	Chan Tsz Shan	19 January 2005 (age 21)	(Football Association of Hong Kong, China) TSL
12	DF	Wei Lan	21 May 2006 (age 20)	(Football Association of Hong Kong, China) Citizen
13	DF	Lai Mae Halasan Tsang	11 September 2001 (age 25)	(Football Association of Hong Kong, China) TSL
21	DF	Wu Choi Yiu	10 September 2004 (age 22)	(Football Association of Hong Kong, China) TSL
6	MF	Tsang Pak Tung	28 October 2003 (age 23)	(Canadian Soccer Association) Langley United
7	MF	Chan Wing Lam	30 July 2003 (age 23)	(Football Association of Hong Kong, China) TSL
8	MF	Fu Chiu Man	2 June 1998 (age 28)	(Football Association of Hong Kong, China) Kitchee
10	MF	Wai Yuen Ting	15 October 1992 (age 34)	(Football Association of Hong Kong, China) Shatin
11	MF	Kwan Wing Yu	6 August 2003 (age 23)	(Football Association of Hong Kong, China) Citizen
14	MF	Karri Chan	11 January 2005 (age 21)	(The Football Association) Blackburn Rovers
15	MF	Sharon Fung	16 July 1999 (age 27)	(Football Association of Hong Kong, China) TSL
16	MF	Sean Luk	9 January 2004 (age 22)	(United States Soccer Federation) MIT Engineers
20	MF	Lucia Ko Pak-ling	25 October 2007 (age 19)	(The Football Association) Derby County
22	MF	Anke Leung Hong-kiu	29 September 2006 (age 20)	(Football Association of Hong Kong, China) TSL
23	MF	Chan Yee Hing	29 March 2004 (age 22)	(Football Association of Hong Kong, China) TSL
9	FW	Li Hau Yi	22 November 2006 (age 19)	(Football Association of Hong Kong, China) Citizen
17	FW	Cheung Wai Ki	22 November 1990 (age 35)	(Football Association of Hong Kong, China) Kitchee

Group play

Pos	Team	Pld	W	D	L	GF	GA	GD	Pts	Qualification
1	China	3	2	1	0	11	3	+8	7	Advance to knockout stage
2	Uzbekistan	3	1	2	0	4	3	+1	5	Advance to knockout stage
3	Philippines	3	1	1	1	4	6	−2	4	Advance to knockout stage
4	Hong Kong	3	0	0	3	2	9	−7	0	

Source: Aichi–Nagoya 26
Rules for classification: Group stage tiebreakers
14 September 2026
19:00

China	5–1	Hong Kong
Chen Qiaozhu 14'; Si Yu 38'; Wang Yanwen 48'; Wang Shuang 80', 89'	Report	Cheung Wai Ki 31'

Gifu Nagaragawa Stadium, Gifu
Attendance: 179
Referee: Khin Nyein Chan (Myanmar)

17 September 2026
19:00

Hong Kong	0–2	Philippines
	Report	Leach 12'; Ramirez 63'

Gifu Nagaragawa Stadium, Gifu
Attendance: 189
Referee: Haneen Murad (Jordan)

21 September 2026
16:00

Uzbekistan	2–1	Hong Kong
Khabibullaeva 34'; Shoyimova 90+2'	Report	Wei Lan 65'

Wave Stadium Kariya, Kariya
Attendance: 561
Referee: Park Se-jin (South Korea)

== Handball ==
Summary

Team	Event	Group stage							Quarterfinal	Semifinal	Final / BM	
Team	Event	Opposition Score	Opposition Score	Opposition Score	Opposition Score	Opposition Score	Opposition Score	Rank	Opposition Score	Opposition Score	Opposition Score	Rank
Hong Kong men's	Men's tournament	Qatar; L 17–40	Japan; L 17–44	China; L 26–38	—N/a			4 Q	Bahrain; L 16–37	Did not advance		
Hong Kong women's	Women's tournament	South Korea; L 16–48	Vietnam; W 26–23	Japan; L 16–39	Kazakhstan; L 27–34	China; L 19–37	Uzbekistan; L 27–28	—N/a				6

=== Men's tournament ===
Team rosters

- Chan Tsz (3)
- Hon Hok (7)
- Wong Ling (8)
- Tse Wing (10)
- Lee Siu (11)
- Law Chun (15)
- Leung Laam (21)
- Zou Yuk (23)
- Lau Ka (26)
- Lee Hau (34)
- Wong Kin (65)
- Kan Yik (72)
- Kan Yik (73)
- Chung Shu (80)
- Yip Chi (82)
- Lin Yun (99)

Group play

Pos	Team	Pld	W	D	L	GF	GA	GD	Pts	Qualification
1	Qatar	3	3	0	0	107	70	+37	6	Quarterfinals
2	Japan (H)	3	2	0	1	103	81	+22	4	Quarterfinals
3	China	3	1	0	2	90	87	+3	2	Quarterfinals
4	Hong Kong	3	0	0	3	60	122	−62	0	Quarterfinals

Source: asiangames2026.org
(H) Hosts

20 September 2026; 17:30	Hong Kong	17–40	Qatar	Toyoda Gosei Memorial Gymnasium; Referees: Ali, Al-Aradi (BHR)
20 September 2026; 17:30	Lin 5	(8–19)	Marzo, Megdich 7	Toyoda Gosei Memorial Gymnasium; Referees: Ali, Al-Aradi (BHR)
20 September 2026; 17:30	1× (suspension)	Report	3× (suspension)	Toyoda Gosei Memorial Gymnasium; Referees: Ali, Al-Aradi (BHR)

21 September 2026; 12:00	Hong Kong	17–44	Japan	Toyoda Gosei Memorial Gymnasium; Referees: Gheisarian, Gheisarian (IRI)
21 September 2026; 12:00	Lin, Wong K. 4	(10–19)	Nakata 7	Toyoda Gosei Memorial Gymnasium; Referees: Gheisarian, Gheisarian (IRI)
21 September 2026; 12:00	2× (suspension)	Report	1× (suspension)	Toyoda Gosei Memorial Gymnasium; Referees: Gheisarian, Gheisarian (IRI)

23 September 2026; 15:00	China	38–26	Hong Kong	Toyoda Gosei Memorial Gymnasium; Referees: Al-Enezi, Al-Naseem (KUW)
23 September 2026; 15:00	Song 7	(20–12)	Kan Y.M., Lin 6	Toyoda Gosei Memorial Gymnasium; Referees: Al-Enezi, Al-Naseem (KUW)
23 September 2026; 15:00	4× (suspension) 1× (red card)	Report	1× (yellow card)	Toyoda Gosei Memorial Gymnasium; Referees: Al-Enezi, Al-Naseem (KUW)

Quarterfinals

26 September 2026; 18:00	Bahrain	37–16	Hong Kong	Kasugai City Gymnasium; Referees: Gheisarian, Gheisarian (IRI)
26 September 2026; 18:00	Abdulkarim 8	(18–8)	Wong K. 3	Kasugai City Gymnasium; Referees: Gheisarian, Gheisarian (IRI)
26 September 2026; 18:00		Report	3× (suspension)	Kasugai City Gymnasium; Referees: Gheisarian, Gheisarian (IRI)

=== Women's tournament ===
Team rosters

- Chan Kam (1)
- Sze Yan (8)
- Chong Sze (10)
- Cheung Man (11)
- Hung Cheuk (12)
- Yeung Chun (15)
- Tsang Yuen (16)
- Wu Lei (18)
- Liu Ho (19)
- Hung Sin (24)
- Tai Tsz (25)
- Lo Kei (33)
- Wong Yee (71)
- Cheung Mei (74)
- Fung Sze (77)
- Yiu Hei (82)

Group play

Pos	Team	Pld	W	D	L	GF	GA	GD	Pts
1st place, gold medalist(s)	South Korea	6	6	0	0	243	105	+138	12
2nd place, silver medalist(s)	Japan (H)	6	5	0	1	217	120	+97	10
3rd place, bronze medalist(s)	China	6	4	0	2	189	154	+35	8
4	Kazakhstan	6	3	0	3	164	187	−23	6
5	Uzbekistan	6	2	0	4	116	206	−90	4
6	Hong Kong	6	1	0	5	131	209	−78	2
7	Vietnam	6	0	0	6	128	207	−79	0

Source: asiangames2026.org
(H) Hosts

19 September 2026; 10:00	South Korea	48–16	Hong Kong	Toyoda Gosei Memorial Gymnasium; Referees: Mazaheri, Mozafari (IRI)
19 September 2026; 10:00	Lee W. 9	(25–9)	Chong 6	Toyoda Gosei Memorial Gymnasium; Referees: Mazaheri, Mozafari (IRI)
19 September 2026; 10:00		Report	1× (suspension)	Toyoda Gosei Memorial Gymnasium; Referees: Mazaheri, Mozafari (IRI)

20 September 2026; 15:30	Vietnam	23–26	Hong Kong	Kasugai City Gymnasium; Referees: Mozafari, Mazaheri (IRI)
20 September 2026; 15:30	Phạm, Phùng 5	(9–11)	Wu 14	Kasugai City Gymnasium; Referees: Mozafari, Mazaheri (IRI)
20 September 2026; 15:30	1× (yellow card) 4× (suspension)	Report	2× (suspension)	Kasugai City Gymnasium; Referees: Mozafari, Mazaheri (IRI)

22 September 2026; 15:30	Hong Kong	16–39	Japan	Kasugai City Gymnasium; Referees: Razakbergenova, Allayarova (UZB)
22 September 2026; 15:30	Chong, Hung 4	(8–18)	Wada 7	Kasugai City Gymnasium; Referees: Razakbergenova, Allayarova (UZB)
22 September 2026; 15:30	1× (suspension)	Report	1× (suspension)	Kasugai City Gymnasium; Referees: Razakbergenova, Allayarova (UZB)

23 September 2026; 13:30	Hong Kong	27–34	Kazakhstan	Kasugai City Gymnasium; Referees: Usui, Kawai (JPN)
23 September 2026; 13:30	Wong 6	(13–21)	Khassakhanova 8	Kasugai City Gymnasium; Referees: Usui, Kawai (JPN)
23 September 2026; 13:30	1× (suspension)	Report	2× (suspension)	Kasugai City Gymnasium; Referees: Usui, Kawai (JPN)

26 September 2026; 15:00	China	37–19	Hong Kong	Toyoda Gosei Memorial Gymnasium; Referees: Razakbergenova, Allayarova (UZB)
26 September 2026; 15:00	Shi 8	(19–11)	Chong 4	Toyoda Gosei Memorial Gymnasium; Referees: Razakbergenova, Allayarova (UZB)
26 September 2026; 15:00	2× (suspension)	Report	2× (suspension)	Toyoda Gosei Memorial Gymnasium; Referees: Razakbergenova, Allayarova (UZB)

27 September 2026; 13:00	Uzbekistan	28–27	Hong Kong	Toyoda Gosei Memorial Gymnasium; Referees: Mozafarivanani, Mazaheri (IRI)
27 September 2026; 13:00	Mullaeva, Safarova 5	(11–14)	Wong 7	Toyoda Gosei Memorial Gymnasium; Referees: Mozafarivanani, Mazaheri (IRI)
27 September 2026; 13:00	2× (suspension)	Report	3× (suspension)	Toyoda Gosei Memorial Gymnasium; Referees: Mozafarivanani, Mazaheri (IRI)

== Karate ==
Men

Athlete	Event	Round of 32	Round of 16	Quarterfinals	Semifinals	Repechage	Final / BM	
Athlete	Event	Opposition Result	Opposition Result	Opposition Result	Opposition Result	Opposition Result	Opposition Result	Rank
Howard Hung	Individual kata	—N/a	Hwang T-y (KOR); W 4–1	Badar-Uugan (MGL); W 5–0	Fong MH (MAC); L 1–4	—N/a	Henry (MAS); W 5–0	3rd place, bronze medalist(s)
Howard Hung; Li Chi Kong; Tang Yu Hin	Team kata	—N/a		Macau; L 0–5	Did not advance	—N/a	Chinese Taipei; W 3–2	3rd place, bronze medalist(s)
Chau Ka Him	–60 kg	Bye	Tamang (NEP); L 1–4	Did not advance				
Cheng Hui Pan	–67 kg	Keletliýew (TKM); W 2–2	Rashidov (UZB); L 0–8	Did not advance				

Women

Athlete	Event	Round of 16	Quarterfinals	Semifinals	Repechage	Final / BM	
Athlete	Event	Opposition Result	Opposition Result	Opposition Result	Opposition Result	Opposition Result	Rank
Grace Lau	Individual kata	Bye	Sadeghi (IRI); W 5–0	Chien H-h (TPE); W 5–0	—N/a	Ono (JPN); L 0–5	2nd place, silver medalist(s)
Tsang Yee Ting	–50 kg	Bye	Chung Y-c (HKG); W 5–0	Adriano (PHI); W 5–4	—N/a	Chandran (MAS); W 0–0	2nd place, silver medalist(s)
Wong Cheuk Lee	–68 kg	—N/a	Dong Tamang (NEP); W 3–0	Aldrous (JOR); L 0–4	—N/a	Faiad (KSA); W 1–0	3rd place, bronze medalist(s)

== Modern pentathlon ==
Athlete	Event	Fencing ranking round (épée one touch)		Semi-finals													Final												
Athlete	Event	Fencing ranking round (épée one touch)		Fencing		Obstacles			Swimming (100 m freestyle)			Laser-run (10 m laser pistol / 3000 m cross-country)			Total points	Final rank	Fencing		Obstacles			Swimming			Laser-run			Total points	Final rank
Athlete	Event	V–D	Rank	Rank	MP points	Time	Rank	MP points	Time	Rank	MP points	Time	Rank	MP points	Total points	Final rank	Rank	MP points	Time	Rank	MP points	Time	Rank	MP points	Time	Rank	MP points	Total points	Final rank
Shum Chun Hei	Men	5–30	36	16	204	0:30.72	14	353	0:54.79	1	327	15:42.05	18	358	1242	18	Did not advance												
Liu Hei Yu	Women	9–23	28	15	206	0:47.78	12	302	1:00.37	1	299	16:07.75	15	333	1140	13	Did not advance												

== Padel ==
Men

Athlete	Event	Round of 32	Round of 16	Quarterfinal	Semifinal	Final / BM	
Athlete	Event	Opponent Score	Opponent Score	Opponent Score	Opponent Score	Opponent Score	Rank
Mohammed Khan; Sean Lo Escoto	Pairs	Kozbak / Pak (KAZ); W 2–1	Roghani / Golestan (IRI); L 0–2	Did not advance			
Chau Kwan Lam; Lo Lok Pui	Pairs	Bye	Lapidus / Canizares (PHI); L 0–2	Did not advance			

Women

Athlete	Event	Round of 32	Round of 16	Quarterfinal	Semifinal	Final / BM	
Athlete	Event	Opponent Score	Opponent Score	Opponent Score	Opponent Score	Opponent Score	Rank
Chan Wing Yau; Lau Hiu Wai	Pairs	Bye	Malazarte /Abad (PHI); L 1–2	Did not advance			
Chan Hiu Laam; Law Yik Yan	Pairs	Bye	Capadocia / Tan (PHI); W 2–1	Putria / Gumulya (INA); L 0–2	Did not advance		

== Rugby sevens ==
Summary

Team	Event	Group stage				Quarter-finals / Pl.	Semi-finals / Pl.	Final / BM / Pl.	
Team	Event	Opponent Score	Opponent Score	Opponent Score	Rank	Opponent Score	Opponent Score	Opponent Score	Rank
Hong Kong men's	Men's tournament	Uzbekistan; W 45–0	Malaysia; W 48–0	China; W 22–0	1 Q	Malaysia; W 50–0	South Korea; W 35–14	China; W 26–0	1st place, gold medalist(s)
Hong Kong women's	Women's tournament	India; W 33–7	Malaysia; W 36–12	China; L 10–24	2 Q	—N/a	Japan; L 12–27	Thailand; W 7–5	3rd place, bronze medalist(s)

== Softball ==
Team	Group stage								Final / BM	
Team	Opposition Score	Opposition Score	Opposition Score	Opposition Score	Opposition Score	Opposition Score	Opposition Score	Rank	Opposition Score	Rank
Hong Kong women's	Chinese Taipei; L 3–10	Singapore; W 5–2	Japan; L 0–15	South Korea; L 1–7	China; L 2–12	Thailand; W 6–5	Philippines; L 3–9	6	Did not advance	

== Table tennis ==
Men

Athlete	Event	Round of 64	Round of 32	Round of 16	Quarterfinal	Semifinal	Final / BM	
Athlete	Event	Opponent Score	Opponent Score	Opponent Score	Opponent Score	Opponent Score	Opponent Score	Rank
Wong Chun Ting	Singles	Bye	Iskandarov (UZB); W 4–1	Alamian (IRI); L 2–4	Did not advance			
Baldwin Chan	Singles	Negara (INA); W 4–1	Aldhubhani (YEM); W 4–0	Ri (PRK); W 4–1	Lin (TPE); L 1–4	Did not advance		
Wong Chun Ting; Baldwin Chan	Doubles	Bye	Khalid / Rafiu (MDV); W 3–0	Alamian / Alamian (IRI); L 1–3	Did not advance			
Lam Siu Hang; Yiu Kwan To	Doubles	Bye	Zheng HW / Chan CI (MAC); W 3–0	Lin / Huang (CHN); L 0–3	Did not advance			

Women

Athlete	Event	Round of 32	Round of 16	Quarterfinal	Semifinal	Final / BM	
Athlete	Event	Opponent Score	Opponent Score	Opponent Score	Opponent Score	Opponent Score	Rank
Doo Hoi Kem	Singles	Batmönkhiin (MGL); W 4–1	Wang (CHN); W 1–4	Did not advance			
Su Tsz Tung	Singles	Erkebaeva (UZB); W 4–2	Hayata (JPN); W 1–4	Did not advance			
Doo Hoi Kem; Ng Wing Lam	Doubles	Kamalova / Erkebaeva (UZB); W 3–1	Lee / Kim (KOR); W 3–2	Ser / Loy (SGP); W 3–0	Hayata / Harimoto (JPN); L 0–4	Did not advance	3rd place, bronze medalist(s)
Su Tsz Tung; Lee Hoi Man	Doubles	Maharani / Sudarnita (INA); W 3–0	Mende / Nagasaki (JPN); L 0–3	Did not advance			

Mixed

Athlete	Event	Round of 32	Round of 16	Quarterfinal	Semifinal	Final / BM	
Athlete	Event	Opponent Score	Opponent Score	Opponent Score	Opponent Score	Opponent Score	Rank
Wong Chun Ting; Doo Hoi Kem	Doubles	Kuan / Mak (MAC); W 3–0	Preechayan / Vijitviriyagul (THA); W 3–0	Shah / Chitale (IND); L 1–3	Did not advance		
Yiu Kwan To; Ng Wing Lam	Doubles	Maharjan / Thapa (NEP); W 3–0	Desai / Ghorpade (IND); L 1–3	Did not advance			

Team

Athlete	Event	Group stage				Round of 16	Quarterfinal	Semifinal	Final	
Athlete	Event	Opposition Score	Opposition Score	Opposition Score	Rank	Opposition Score	Opposition Score	Opposition Score	Opposition Score	Rank
Baldwin Chan; Kwan Man Ho; Lam Siu Hang; Wong Chun Ting; Yiu Kwan To	Men's	Kyrgyzstan; W 3–0	Thailand; W 3–1	—N/a	1 Q	Qatar W 3–0	South Korea; L 0–3	Did not advance		
Doo Hoi Kem; Lam Yee Lok; Lee Hoi Man; Ng Wing Lam; Su Tsz Tung	Women's	Lebanon; W 3–0	Thailand; W 3–2	Qatar; W 3–0	1 Q	Singapore; L 2–3	Did not advance			

== Tennis ==
These are the players for the tennis event.

Athlete	Event	Round of 64	Round of 32	Round of 16	Quarter-finals	Semi-finals	Final	
Athlete	Event	Opposition Score	Opposition Score	Opposition Score	Opposition Score	Opposition Score	Opposition Score	Rank
Coleman Wong	Men's singles	Bye	Al-mashni (JOR); W 6–4, 6–1	Watanuki (JPN); W 7–6^{(7–1)}, 6–3	Samrej (THA); W 6–3, 6–0	Sultanov (UZB); W 3–6, 6–3, 6–2	Wu Yb (CHN); W 6–2, 6–4	1st place, gold medalist(s)
Kai Thompson	Men's singles	Bye	Matsuoka (JPN); L 6–7^{(2–7)}, 1–6	Did not advance				
Wong Tsz Fu; Cheng Siu Chi	Men's doubles	—N/a	Yevseyev / Zhukayev (KAZ); L 1–6, 3–6	Did not advance				
Tam Sin Hang; Jack Cheng	Men's doubles	—N/a	Shevchenko / Skatov (KAZ); L 3–6, 2–6	Did not advance				
Adithya Karunaratne	Women's singles	—N/a	Zhiyenbayeva (KAZ); L 1–6, 5–7	Did not advance				
Yandi Shek	Women's singles	—N/a	Shubina (UZB); W 2–0 retired	Sawangkaew (THA); L 5–7, 3–6	Did not advance			
Eudice Chong; Wong Hong Yi	Women's doubles	—N/a	Bye	Chogsomjav / Chogsomjav (MGL); W 6–4, 6–2	Kulambayeva / Zhiyenbayeva (KAZ); W 6–1, 6–3	Chan H-c / Wu F-h (TPE); L 4–6, 2–6	Did not advance	3rd place, bronze medalist(s)
Kallista Liu; Lai Ching Laam	Women's doubles	—N/a	Eala / Rivera (PHI); L 1–6, 3–6	Did not advance				
Wong Tsz Fu; Wong Hong Yi	Mixed doubles	—N/a	Yuldasheva / Shin (UZB); L 6–7^{(5–7)}, 6–0, [9–11]	Did not advance				
Kai Thompson; Eudice Chong	Mixed doubles	—N/a	Raina / Narayanaswamy (IND); W 6–4, 6–4	Ku Y-w / Shin W-b (KOR); W 6–2, 4–6, [13–11]	Aoyama / Kusuhara (JPN); L 5–7, 2–6	Did not advance		

== Triathlon ==
Individual

Athlete	Event	Time						Rank
Athlete	Event	Swim (0.75 km)	Trans 1	Bike (20 km)	Trans 2	Run (5 km)	Total	Rank
Oscar Coggins	Men	8:58	0:36	28:15	0:15	15:51	53:55	7
Robin Elg	Men	8:53	0:38	28:18	0:26	15:26	53:41	6
Bailee Brown	Women	9:58	0:40	30:07	0:20	18:45	59:50	8
Tallulah Wright	Women	10:05	0:39	30:03	0:22	19:22	1:00:31	10

Relay

Athlete	Event	Time						Rank
Athlete	Event	Swim (300 m)	Trans 1	Bike (6.6 km)	Trans 2	Run (1 km)	Total	Rank
Cade Wright	Mixed	4:14	0:47	10:30	0:25	7:22	23:18	—N/a
Oscar Coggins	Mixed	3:57	0:44	9:18	0:23	5:52	20:14	—N/a
Bailee Brown	Mixed	4:24	0:50	10:47	0:23	6:54	23:18	—N/a
Robin Elg	Mixed	4:03	0:40	9:26	0:21	6:05	20:35	—N/a
Total	Mixed	—N/a					1:27:25	3rd place, bronze medalist(s)

== Volleyball ==
=== Indoor ===
Summary

Team	Event	Group stage				Quarter-finals / Pl.	Semi-finals / Pl.	Final / BM / Pl.	
Team	Event	Opposition Score	Opposition Score	Opposition Score	Rank	Opposition Score	Opposition Score	Opposition Score	Rank
Hong Kong men's	Men's tournament	Qatar; L 1–3	India; L 0–3	Vietnam; L 1–3	4	Kazakhstan; L 2–3	Kyrgyzstan; L 1–3	Uzbekistan; L 0–3	16
Hong Kong women's	Women's tournament	South Korea; L 0–3	Vietnam; L 0–3	Qatar; W 3–0	3	Bye	Nepal; W 3–0	Philippines; L 0–3	10

==== Men's tournament ====
Team roster

- Chan King Hoi
- Cheng Tsz Yui
- Cheung Ngai Yiu
- Chiu Yin Laam
- Ko Ching Kin
- Kong Cheuk Hin
- Lam Sze Lok
- Lau Kin Ken
- Damian Tam
- Wan Ka Nam
- Samuel Wong
- Yuen Sze Wai

Group play

Pos	Team	Pld	W	L	Pts	SW	SL	SR	SPW	SPL	SPR	Qualification
1	India	3	3	0	8	9	2	4.500	275	246	1.118	Quarterfinals
2	Qatar	3	2	1	7	8	4	2.000	297	280	1.061	Quarterfinals
3	Vietnam	3	1	2	3	3	7	0.429	230	238	0.966	Classification 9th–16th
4	Hong Kong	3	0	3	0	2	9	0.222	234	272	0.860	Classification 9th–16th

Source: asiangames2026.org
Rules for classification: Tiebreakers

==== Women's tournament ====
Team roster

- Halimah Zampaligre Wilson
- Michelle Cheung
- Chim Wing Lam
- Fong Ka Yi
- Lee Kit Sum
- Leung Nga Yee
- Shum Lam
- Suen Yee Tung
- Tang Sum Yuen
- Wong Wan Wun
- Yim Wing Ni
- Yu Ying Chi

Group play

Pos	Team	Pld	W	L	Pts	SW	SL	SR	SPW	SPL	SPR	Qualification
1	South Korea	3	3	0	9	9	1	9.000	251	157	1.599	Quarterfinals
2	Vietnam	3	2	1	6	7	3	2.333	238	176	1.352	Quarterfinals
3	Hong Kong	3	1	2	3	3	6	0.500	177	179	0.989	Classification 9th–12th
4	Qatar	3	0	3	0	0	9	0.000	71	225	0.316	Classification 9th–14th

Source: asiangames2026.org
Rules for classification: Tiebreakers

=== Beach volleyball ===
Event	Athletes	Group stage				Round of 16	Quarterfinals	Semifinals	Final	
Event	Athletes	Opponent Score	Opponent Score	Opponent Score	Rank	Opponent Score	Opponent Score	Opponent Score	Opponent Score	Rank
Men's beach volleyball	Chong Kei Loi; Wang Pei Lam	Nguyen Anh Tuan (VIE); Le Hoang Y (VIE); L 0–2	Wu Jiaxin (CHN); Zhou Chaowei (CHN); L 0–2	—N/a	3	Did not advance				
Men's beach volleyball	Li Cheuk Hei; Li Lit Fung	Bae Inho (KOR); Yeo Minsu (KOR); W 2–0	Faisal Imam Ahmad (INA); Bayhaqly Fairuz (INA); L 0–2	Bogatu Sergey (KAZ); Gurin Kirill (KAZ); L 0–2	3	Did not advance				

Event	Athletes	Group stage				Round of 16	Quarterfinals	Semifinals	Final	
Event	Athletes	Opponent Score	Opponent Score	Opponent Score	Rank	Opponent Score	Opponent Score	Opponent Score	Opponent Score	Rank
Women's beach volleyball	Duk Wing Man; Duk Wing Tung	Batjargal Tsolmon (MGL); Gantogtokh Khandsuren (MGL); W 2–0	Fathimath Anal (MDV); Aminath Areesha (MDV); W 2–0	Progella Khylem Harl (PHI); Pagara Sofiah Shanine (PHI); L 0–2	2 Q	Merey Kozhakhmet (KAZ); Laura Kabulbekova (KAZ); L 0–2	Did not advance			
Women's beach volleyball	Wong Man Ching; Tsang Yue Ling	Alawaththage Kasuni Tharuka Lakshani (SRI); Kumbure Gedara Chathurika Madushani Weer (SRI); W 2–0	Hashim Malak (QAT); Ismail Sheqaf (QAT); W 2–0	Seehawong Patcharaporn (THA); Mungkhon Salinda (THA); L 0–2	2 Q	Progella Khylem Harl (PHI); Pagara Sofiah Shanine (PHI); L 0–2	Did not advance			

== Wushu ==
=== Taolu ===
Men

Athlete	Event	Event 1		Event 2		Total	Rank
Athlete	Event	Result	Rank	Result	Rank	Total	Rank
Chen Jin Song	Changquan	9.700	8	—N/a		9.700	8
Ho Yin Ching	Changquan	9.706	5	—N/a		9.706	5
Lau Chi Lung	Nanquan & nangun	9.730	3	9.726	3	19.456	2nd place, silver medalist(s)
Yeung Chung Hei	Taijiquan & taijian	9.346	13	9.730	2	19.076	13

Women

Athlete	Event	Event 1		Event 2		Total	Rank
Athlete	Event	Result	Rank	Result	Rank	Total	Rank
Lydia Sham	Changquan	9.710	1	—N/a		9.710	1st place, gold medalist(s)
Michelle Yeung	Changquan	9.703	5	—N/a		9.703	5
Juanita Mok	Taijiquan & taijijian	9.706	6	9.713	5	19.419	5

=== Sanda ===
Athlete	Event	Round of 16	Quarter-finals	Semi-finals	Final	
Athlete	Event	Opposition Score	Opposition Score	Opposition Score	Opposition Score	Rank
Leung Yu Hong	Men's –60 kg	—N/a	Mahdi Kermani (IRI); W 2–0	Bintang Reindra Nada Guitara (INA); W 2–1	Tang Sishuo (CHN); L PD	2nd place, silver medalist(s)
Cheung Yat Lam	Men's –70 kg	Moharrami Piraghom (IRI); L 0–2	Did not advance			
Chan Tsz Sing	Women's –52 kg	Chen S-y (TPE); W 2–0	Tursyn Ayan (KAZ); W 2–0	Sinkaeichetan Sogand (IRI); L 0–2	Did not advance	3rd place, bronze medalist(s)
