= 2026 Pan Pacific Swimming Championships – Men's 50 metre butterfly =

Men's 50 metre butterfly at the 2026 Pan Pacific Swimming Championships
- Venue: William Woollett Jr. Aquatics Center
- Dates: August 12
- Competitors: 29 from 14 nations
- Winning time: 22.75 CR

Medalists
gold medal	Ben Armbruster	Australia
silver medal	Van Mathias	United States
bronze medal	Guilherme Caribé	Brazil

Official Video (heats)

Official Video (B and A final)

The men's 50 metre butterfly event at the 2026 Pan Pacific Swimming Championships was held on August 12 at the William Woollett Jr. Aquatics Center in Irvine, California. It was the second of 41 events on the four-day pool swimming program, and the second time the men's 50 metre butterfly had been contested at the championships, having previously been held in 2010. A total of 29 swimmers from 14 nations entered the competition. The event was won by Australian Ben Armbruster, the reigning Commonwealth champion, in a championship record time of 22.75 seconds. He finished ahead of American Van Mathias, who claimed the silver medal in a personal best of 22.84 seconds, and Brazilian Guilherme Caribé, who won bronze in a personal best of 22.88 seconds. The second American in the final, Michael Andrew, finished fourth in 22.99 seconds.

== Competition format and event history ==
The Pan Pacific Swimming Championships is an international long course swimming competition first held in 1985. It was established as an alternative to the European Championships and is open to nations that are not members of European Aquatics. (Note: At a meeting of the four charter nations of the Pan Pacific Swimming Association (the United States, Australia, Canada and Japan) on August 23, 2024, it was agreed that the 10 kilometre open water events at the 2026 championships would be open to all members of European Aquatics wishing to participate, with a maximum of two entries per nation in each event.) The 2026 championships featured 41 swimming events in the pool across four days, from August 12 to 15, preceded by the men's and women's 10 km open water swimming events on August 10. The men's 50 metre butterfly was the fourth event overall and the second on the pool swimming program, following the women's 50 metre butterfly event.

The event consisted of preliminary heats followed by an A final and a B final, with no semifinals contested. Both the heats and finals were held on August 12, the opening day of pool competition. Under the championship regulations, each nation could enter an unlimited number of swimmers in the preliminary heats. However, only the two fastest eligible swimmers from each nation could advance to the A final, following any withdrawals. Each nation could also qualify up to two additional swimmers for the B final, regardless of whether it had one or two representatives in the A final. Consequently, a maximum of four swimmers per nation could compete across both finals. The eight A finalists contested the medals and championship points, while the B final determined the remaining eligible finishing positions.

The men's 50 metre butterfly was first contested at the 2010 championships, although the 50 metre butterfly, backstroke and breaststroke events were excluded from official championship scoring. In the preliminary heats, American Robert Margalis recorded 25.11 seconds in the opening heat to set the inaugural championship record, before compatriot Tim Phillips lowered the mark to 23.69 in the second heat. Brazil's César Cielo improved the mark to 23.48 in the third heat, followed by Australia's Geoff Huegill, who recorded the fastest qualifying time of 23.27 in the fourth heat. Later that day, Cielo lowered the championship record to 23.03 seconds in winning the A final. The event was not contested at the 2014 or 2018 championships, while the 2022 championships were cancelled due to the COVID-19 pandemic. The men's and women's 50 metre butterfly, backstroke and breaststroke events were included in the championship program in 2026, ahead of their introduction as Olympic medal events at the 2028 Summer Olympics in Los Angeles, following approval by the International Olympic Committee in April 2025. The official timing documentation for the 2026 championships listed a pre-competition championship record of 23.03 seconds, matching Cielo's winning performance in 2010.

== Race summary ==
A total of 29 swimmers from 14 nations entered the event. American Thomas Heilman withdrew from the event to focus on the men's 200 metre butterfly, which was also contested on the opening day. Heilman subsequently missed the A final of the 200 metre butterfly under the two-swimmers-per-nation restriction, but won the B final. His compatriot Quintin McCarty was also included in the preliminary entry list but withdrew to focus on the men's 50 metre backstroke, which he subsequently won.

American Van Mathias was the first to break the championship record, recording 22.99 seconds in the second heat. Brazil's Guilherme Caribé lowered the record to 22.96 in the third heat, before Australia's Ben Armbruster recorded the fastest qualifying time of 22.92 in the fourth heat, setting the third successive championship record of the morning. American Michael Andrew qualified fourth overall in 23.01, followed by compatriots Santo Condorelli in fifth with 23.18 and Dare Rose in seventh with 23.26. However, Condorelli and Rose were assigned to the B final under the two-swimmers-per-nation restriction, alongside Australia's Matthew Temple, who tied for eighth overall in 23.45 but was the third-fastest Australian. Another American, Shaine Casas, recorded the twelfth-fastest time of 23.61 but failed to qualify for either final, having been the fifth-fastest American in the heats. Canada's Finlay Knox qualified for the A final despite recording the eleventh-fastest time of 23.60. Further down the standings, Eritrea's Aaron Ghebre Owusu established a national record of 24.97 seconds, finishing 25th overall. In the evening session, Condorelli won the B final in 23.03, ahead of China's Chen Juner in 23.34 and Canada's Chris Weeks in 23.57. Condorelli's winning time would have placed him sixth in the A final, although he was the third-fastest American across the two finals, behind Mathias and Andrew.

Armbruster entered the A final as the fastest qualifier, having broken the championship record during the heats. He improved on his preliminary time to win the gold medal in a championship record of 22.75, giving Australia its first gold medal of the championships. His winning time was just 0.02 seconds outside the Australian and Oceanian record of 22.73, which he had equaled at the 2026 Commonwealth Games in Glasgow, where he shared the gold medal with compatriot Kyle Chalmers. Their performances had matched the record originally established by Matt Targett in 2009. Chalmers did not compete at this meet, having opted to prioritize the Commonwealth Games. Armbruster finished 0.09 seconds ahead of Mathias, who claimed silver in a personal best of 22.84 on his senior international debut for the United States, improving on his previous best of 22.87 set at a time trial in Indianapolis in June 2026. Brazil's Caribé secured the bronze medal in a personal best of 22.88, improving on his previous best of 22.91 established at the 2025 World Aquatics Championships in Singapore. They were followed by American Andrew in fourth with 22.99 and Australia's Isaac Cooper in fifth with 23.02. Canada's Knox finished sixth in 23.39, ahead of South Africa's Calvyn Justus in seventh with 23.44 and Japan's Shoon Mitsunaga in eighth with 23.63.

== Records ==
Prior to this competition, the existing records were as follows:

Records before the 2026 Pan Pacific Swimming Championships
Record	Time (s)	Athlete (nation)	Meet	Location	Date	Ref
World record	22.27	Andriy Govorov (UKR)	Sette Colli Trophy	Rome, Italy	July 1, 2018	
Championship record	23.03	Record Mark				

== Schedule ==
The schedule was as follows:

All times are Pacific Daylight Time (UTC−7)

Schedule
Date	Time	Round
Wednesday, August 12, 2026	10:06	Heats
Wednesday, August 12, 2026	19:09	Finals

== Results ==
=== Heats ===
The heats were held at 10:06 on August 12, 2026.

Key: QA = Qualified for A final; QB = Qualified for B final; R = Reserve; CR = Championship record; NR = National record.

Heat results
Rank	Heat	Lane	Swimmer	Nation	Time	Notes
1	4	5	Ben Armbruster	Australia	22.92	QA, CR
2	3	5	Guilherme Caribé	Brazil	22.96	QA, CR
3	2	4	Van Mathias	United States	22.99	QA, CR
4	4	4	Michael Andrew	United States	23.01	QA
5	3	3	Santo Condorelli	United States	23.18	QB
6	4	6	Isaac Cooper	Australia	23.21	QA
7	3	4	Dare Rose	United States	23.26	QB
=8	2	5	Shoon Mitsunaga	Japan	23.45	QA
=8	3	6	Matthew Temple	Australia	23.45	QB
10	2	6	Calvyn Justus	South Africa	23.47	QA
11	2	3	Finlay Knox	Canada	23.60	QA
12	4	3	Shaine Casas	United States	23.61	
13	3	2	Chen Juner	China	23.69	QB
14	4	2	Chris Weeks	Canada	23.77	QB
15	2	2	Santiago Grassi	Argentina	23.98	QB
16	2	7	Cameron Gray	New Zealand	24.04	QB
17	3	7	Shuya Matsumoto	Japan	24.09	QB
18	1	2	Ruslan Gaziev	Canada	24.16	R
19	4	7	Filip Senc-Samardzic	Canada	24.19	
=20	2	1	Javier Acevedo	Canada	24.37	
=20	3	1	Jarden Eaton	South Africa	24.37	R
22	4	1	Logan Wataru Noguchi	Philippines	24.39	
23	1	4	Malcolm McKenzie	Jamaica	24.80	
24	4	8	Yuri Kisil	Canada	24.88	
25	2	8	Aaron Ghebre Owusu	Eritrea	24.97	NR
26	1	5	Michael van Heerden	South Africa	25.06	
27	3	8	Yang Yu-Xiang	Chinese Taipei	25.55	
28	1	3	Zachary Jackson-Blaine	Jamaica	26.81	
29	1	6	Shawn Dingilius-Wallace	Palau	29.52	

=== B final ===
The B final was held at 19:09 on August 12, 2026.

B final results
Rank	Lane	Swimmer	Nation	Time	Notes
9	4	Santo Condorelli	United States	23.03	
10	3	Chen Juner	China	23.34	
11	6	Chris Weeks	Canada	23.57	
12	5	Jarden Eaton	South Africa	23.87	
13	2	Santiago Grassi	Argentina	23.97	
14	8	Ruslan Gaziev	Canada	24.03	
15	7	Cameron Gray	New Zealand	24.10	
16	1	Shuya Matsumoto	Japan	24.22	

=== A final ===
The A final was held after the B final on August 12, 2026.

A final results
Rank	Lane	Swimmer	Nation	Time	Points (Note: A team trophy was awarded to the nation scoring the most points. In individual events, points were awarded on a 9–7–6–5–4–3–2–1 basis for first through eighth place in the A final. In relay events, points were awarded on an 18–14–12–10–8–6–4–2 basis for the first- through eighth-place teams in the A final. The United States won the team title with 540.5 points, ahead of Australia (409), Japan (228) and Canada (220).)	Notes
1st place, gold medalist(s)	4	Ben Armbruster	Australia	22.75	9	CR
2nd place, silver medalist(s)	3	Van Mathias	United States	22.84	7	
3rd place, bronze medalist(s)	5	Guilherme Caribé	Brazil	22.88	6	
4	6	Michael Andrew	United States	22.99	5	
5	2	Isaac Cooper	Australia	23.02	4	
6	8	Finlay Knox	Canada	23.39	3	
7	1	Calvyn Justus	South Africa	23.44	2	
8	7	Shoon Mitsunaga	Japan	23.63	1	
