= Swimming at the 2026 Asian Games – Men's 4 × 100 metre medley relay =

Men's 4 × 100 metre medley relay at the 2026 Asian Games
- Venue: Tokyo Aquatics Centre
- Date: 22 September 2026
- Competitors: 60 from 15 nations

Medalists
gold medal	China; Xu Jiayu, Dong Zhihao, Xu Fang, Pan Zhanle, Jiang Chenglin, Qin Haiyang, Wang Xizhe, Zhang Zhanshuo
silver medal	Japan; Hidekazu Takehara, Shin Ohashi, Shoon Mitsunaga, Tatsuya Murasa, Shuya Matsumoto
bronze medal	South Korea; Lee Ju-ho, Choi Dong-yeol, Yang Jae-hoon, Kim Young-beom, Yoon Ji-hwan, Cho Sung-jae, Kim Ji-hun, Hwang Sun-woo

The men's 4 × 100 metre medley relay event at the 2026 Asian Games took place on 22 September 2026 at the Tokyo Aquatics Centre. China won the gold medal in 3:27.89, followed by Japan with silver in 3:28.70 and South Korea with bronze in a national record time of 3:31.97.

== Schedule ==
All times are Japan Standard Time (UTC+09:00)

Date	Time	Event
Tuesday, 22 September 2026	11:29	Heats
Tuesday, 22 September 2026	18:25	Final

== Records ==
Prior to this competition, the existing world, Asian and Games records were as follows.

World Record	United States	3:26.78	Tokyo, Japan	1 August 2021
Asian Record	China	3:27.01	Hangzhou, China	26 September 2023
Games Record	China	3:27.01	Hangzhou, China	26 September 2023

== Results ==
=== Heats ===
Rank	Heat	Team	Time	Notes
1	2	Japan (JPN)	3:33.62	Q
		Hidekazu Takehara	54.23	
		Shin Ohashi	1:00.14	
		Shoon Mitsunaga	51.21	
		Shuya Matsumoto	48.04	
2	2	China (CHN)	3:36.56	Q
		Jiang Chenglin	54.65	
		Qin Haiyang	59.52	
		Wang Xizhe	51.93	
		Zhang Zhanshuo	50.46	
3	1	Kazakhstan (KAZ)	3:38.65	Q
		Alexandr Rumynskiy	56.51	
		Aibat Myrzamuratov	1:00.79	
		Maxim Skazobtsov	51.34	
		Maxim Klimenko	50.01	
4	2	Indonesia (INA)	3:38.97	Q
		Jason Yusuf	55.12	
		Arya Adrean Putra Haryono	1:00.88	
		Joe Kurniawan	52.75	
		Kevin Prayitno	50.22	
5	1	South Korea (KOR)	3:39.17	Q
		Yoon Ji-hwan	55.25	
		Cho Sung-jae	1:01.67	
		Kim Ji-hun	53.55	
		Hwang Sun-woo	48.70	
6	1	Singapore (SGP)	3:39.76	Q
		Tedd Chan	56.30	
		Chan Chun Ho	1:01.77	
		Azman Ardi	53.53	
		Mikkel Lee	48.16	
7	2	India (IND)	3:40.41	Q
		Rishabh Das	54.97	
		Danush Suresh	1:02.65	
		Benedicton Beniston	52.38	
		Akash Mani	50.41	
8	1	Thailand (THA)	3:40.51	Q
		Tonnam Kanteemool	56.09	
		Marrich Somridhivej	1:01.44	
		Surasit Thongdeang	54.07	
		Pongpanod Trithan	48.91	
9	1	Hong Kong (HKG)	3:41.76	
		Hayden Kwan	55.64	
		Cheung Chi Kit Nicholas	1:00.29	
		Ralph Yat Ho Koo	55.18	
		Wan Chun Lim	50.65	
10	2	Chinese Taipei (TPE)	3:42.45	
		Chuang Mu-lun	55.20	
		Chang Chiao-i	1:00.44	
		Tsai Ruei-hong	56.18	
		Lin Yi-cheng	50.63	
11	2	Malaysia (MAS)	3:42.78	
		Khiew Hoe Yean	56.90	
		Andrew Goh	1:03.18	
		Bryan Xin Ren Leong	53.83	
		Arvin Singh	48.87	
12	1	Iran (IRI)	3:43.20	NR
		Homer Abbasi	56.77	
		Amir Motae	1:00.47	
		Mohammad Ghasemi	55.51	
		Samyar Abdoli	50.45	
13	2	Qatar (QAT)	3:47.15	
		Abdalla Elghamry	58.86	
		Mohamed Mohamed	1:03.05	
		Mohamed Ismail	54.96	
		Ali Hassan	50.28	
14	1	Macau (MAC)	3:47.89	
		Chan Hou Wa	59.12	
		Chao Man Hou	1:01.96	
		Lam Chi Chong	56.47	
		Ng Chi Hin	50.34	
15	2	Mongolia (MGL)	3:59.57	
		Tselmeg Khash-erdene	1:04.53	
		Enkhmend Enkhmend	1:05.33	
		Belgudei Uyanga	59.23	
		Enkhtamir Batbayar	50.48	
	1	Bahrain (BRN)	DSQ	
		Stepan Goncharov	54.98	
		Abdulla Jamal	1:06.35	
		Mikhail Arkhangelskiy	DSQ	
		Ahmed Helal	DSQ	

=== Final ===
Rank	Team	Time	Notes
1st place, gold medalist(s)	China (CHN)	3:27.89	
	Xu Jiayu	52.13	
	Dong Zhihao	57.94	
	Xu Fang	50.52	
	Pan Zhanle	47.30	
2nd place, silver medalist(s)	Japan (JPN)	3:28.70	NR
	Hidekazu Takehara	53.71	
	Shin Ohashi	57.64	
	Shoon Mitsunaga	49.74	
	Tatsuya Murasa	47.61	
3rd place, bronze medalist(s)	South Korea (KOR)	3:31.97	NR
	Lee Ju-ho	53.92	
	Choi Dong-yeol	58.98	
	Yang Jae-hoon	51.58	
	Kim Young-beom	47.49	
4	Kazakhstan (KAZ)	3:36.46	
	Alexandr Rumynskiy	56.35	
	Aibat Myrzamuratov	59.59	
	Maxim Skazobtsov	51.30	
	Gleb Kovalenya	49.22	
5	Thailand (THA)	3:38.84	NR
	Tonnam Kanteemool	56.20	
	Marrich Somridhivej	1:01.16	
	Surasit Thongdeang	53.12	
	Pongpanod Trithan	48.36	
6	Indonesia (INA)	3:39.08	
	Jason Yusuf	54.77	NR
	Arya Adrean Putra Haryono	1:01.55	
	Joe Kurniawan	52.84	
	Kevin Prayitno	49.92	
7	Singapore (SGP)	3:40.63	
	Reagan Cheng	55.54	
	Chan Chun Ho	1:02.03	
	Brandon Yan Xi Yap	54.22	
	Jonathan Tan	48.84	
8	India (IND)	3:44.26	
	Utkarsh Patil	55.89	
	Danush Suresh	1:03.87	
	Benedicton Beniston	53.67	
	Akash Mani	50.83	
