= 2026 Pan Pacific Swimming Championships – Men's 200 metre breaststroke =

Men's 200 metre breaststroke at the 2026 Pan Pacific Swimming Championships
- Venue: William Woollett Jr. Aquatics Center
- Dates: 15 August (heats & finals)
- Competitors: 12 from 6 nations
- Winning time: 2:08.09

Medalists
gold medal	Zac Stubblety-Cook	Australia
silver medal	Josh Matheny	United States
bronze medal	Shin Ohashi	Japan

The men's 200 metre breaststroke competition at the 2026 Pan Pacific Swimming Championships took place on August 15 at the William Woollett Jr. Aquatics Center in Irvine, California. The defending champion was Ippei Watanabe of Japan.

== Records ==
Prior to this competition, the existing world and Pan Pacific records were as follows:

World record	Qin Haiyang (CHN)	2:05.48	Fukuoka, Japan	28 July 2023
Pan Pacific Championships record	Ippei Watanabe (JPN)	2:07.75	Tokyo, Japan	12 August 2018

== Results ==
All times are in minutes and seconds.

KEY:	QA	Qualified A Final	QB	Qualified B Final	CR	Championships record	NR	National record

=== Heats ===
The first round was held on 15 August from 11:10.

Only two swimmers from each country may advance to the A or B final. If a country not qualify any swimmer to the A final, that same country may qualify up to three swimmers to the B final.

Rank	Heat	Lane	Name	Nationality	Time	Notes
1	2	4	Shin Ohashi	Japan	2:08.90	QA
2	2	5	Yamato Fukasawa	Japan	2:09.00	QA
3	1	4	Ippei Watanabe	Japan	2:09.72	QB
4	2	3	Josh Matheny	United States	2:09.90	QA
5	1	5	AJ Pouch	United States	2:10.01	QA
6	1	3	Zac Stubblety-Cook	Australia	2:10.57	QA
7	2	2	Campbell McKean	United States	2:10.70	QB
8	1	6	Bailey Lello	Australia	2:10.76	QA
9	2	6	Oliver Dawson	Canada	2:11.00	QA
10	1	2	Apollo Hess	Canada	2:13.82	QA
11	2	7	Chan Chun Ho	Singapore	2:17.37	QB
12	1	7	Giancarlo Raccanello	South Africa	2:29.55	QB

=== B Final ===
The finals were held on 12 August from 20:12.

Rank	Lane	Name	Nationality	Time	Notes
9	5	Campbell McKean	United States	2:10.28	
10	4	Ippei Watanabe	Japan	2:10.67	
11	3	Chan Chun Ho	Singapore	2:18.32	
12	6	Giancarlo Raccanello	South Africa	2:29.18	

=== A Final ===
Rank	Lane	Name	Nationality	Time	Notes
1st place, gold medalist(s)	2	Zac Stubblety-Cook	Australia	2:08.09	
2nd place, silver medalist(s)	3	Josh Matheny	United States	2:08.25	
3rd place, bronze medalist(s)	4	Shin Ohashi	Japan	2:08.27	
4	7	Bailey Lello	Australia	2:09.70	
5	5	Yamato Fukasawa	Japan	2:10.24	
6	6	AJ Pouch	United States	2:10.67	
7	1	Oliver Dawson	Canada	2:11.23	
8	8	Apollo Hess	Canada	2:15.48	
