= Swimming at the 2026 Asian Games – Men's 200 metre breaststroke =

Men's 200 metre breaststroke at the 2026 Asian Games
- Venue: Tokyo Aquatics Centre
- Date: 24 September 2026
- Competitors: 24 from 16 nations

Medalists
gold medal	Shin Ohashi	Japan
silver medal	Denis Petrashov	Kyrgyzstan
bronze medal	Cho Sung-jae	South Korea

The men's 200 metre breaststroke event at the 2026 Asian Games took place on 24 September 2026 at the Tokyo Aquatics Centre. Japan's Shin Ohashi won the gold medal in a world-record time of 2:04.83. Ohashi also lowered his own world junior record of 2:06.59.

== Schedule ==
All times are Japan Standard Time (UTC+09:00)

Date	Time	Event
Thursday, 24 September 2026	10:26	Heats
Thursday, 24 September 2026	17:19	Final

== Records ==
Prior to this competition, the existing world, Asian and Games records were as follows.

World Record	Qin Haiyang (CHN)	2:05.48	Fukuoka, Japan	28 July 2023
Asian Record	Qin Haiyang (CHN)	2:05.48	Fukuoka, Japan	28 July 2023
Games Record	Qin Haiyang (CHN)	2:07.03	Hangzhou, China	28 September 2023

== Results ==
=== Heats ===
Rank	Heat	Athlete	Time	Notes
1	3	Shin Ohashi (JPN)	2:09.93	Q
2	2	Ippei Watanabe (JPN)	2:10.88	Q
3	1	Denis Petrashov (KGZ)	2:11.13	Q
4	3	Cho Sung-jae (KOR)	2:11.39	Q
5	2	Mak Sai Ting Adam (HKG)	2:11.69	Q
6	1	Wang Junteng (CHN)	2:12.41	Q
7	2	Tsai Ruei-hong (TPE)	2:12.46	Q
8	1	Chang Chiao-i (TPE)	2:12.68	Q
9	3	Chillingworth Adam John (HKG)	2:13.05	Q
10	2	Phạm Thành Bảo (VIE)	2:13.06	Q
11	1	Aibat Myrzamuratov (KAZ)	2:13.28	Reserve
12	3	Yu Zongda (CHN)	2:13.59	Reserve
13	3	Chan Chun Ho (SGP)	2:14.71	
14	2	Gian Santos (PHI)	2:14.89	
15	2	Reagan Cheng (SGP)	2:16.10	
16	3	Muhammadismail Rahmonov (UZB)	2:16.80	
17	3	Arya Haryono (INA)	2:19.73	
18	1	Andrew Goh (MAS)	2:21.77	
19	3	Tan Khai Xin (MAS)	2:23.28	
20	2	Pieter Sok Kha Vanoosten (CAM)	2:24.28	
21	1	Khas-erdene Duulal (MGL)	2:26.22	
22	2	Enkhmend Enkhmend (MGL)	2:29.92	
23	1	Looth Hussain (MDV)	2:41.95	
	1	Pasawat Kantakom (THA)	DNS	

=== Final ===
Rank	Athlete	Time	Notes
1st place, gold medalist(s)	Shin Ohashi (JPN)	2:04.83	WR
2nd place, silver medalist(s)	Denis Petrashov (KGZ)	2:08.67	NR
3rd place, bronze medalist(s)	Cho Sung-jae (KOR)	2:08.76	
4	Mak Sai Ting Adam (HKG)	2:08.77	
5	Ippei Watanabe (JPN)	2:09.50	
6	Wang Junteng (CHN)	2:10.61	
7	Chang Chiao-i (TPE)	2:11.09	NR
8	Chillingworth Adam John (HKG)	2:11.27	
9	Tsai Ruei-hong (TPE)	2:12.40	
10	Phạm Thành Bảo (VIE)	2:15.24	
