= Swimming at the 2026 Asian Games – Men's 50 metre breaststroke =

Men's 50 metre breaststroke at the 2026 Asian Games
- Venue: Tokyo Aquatics Centre
- Date: 25 September 2026
- Competitors: 40 from 28 nations

Medalists
gold medal	Qin Haiyang	China
silver medal	Liu Junjie	China
bronze medal	Shin Ohashi	Japan

The men's 50 metre breaststroke event at the 2026 Asian Games took place on 25 September 2026 at the Tokyo Aquatics Centre. China's Qin Haiyang, the defending champion, retained his title with a winning time of 26.68 seconds. His compatriot Liu Junjie won the silver medal in 26.99 seconds, while Japan's Shin Ohashi won bronze in 27.01 seconds.

== Schedule ==
All times are Japan Standard Time (UTC+09:00)

Date	Time	Event
Friday, 25 September 2026	10:06	Heats
Friday, 25 September 2026	17:05	Final

== Records ==
Prior to this competition, the existing world, Asian and Games records were as follows.

World Record	Adam Peaty (GBR)	25.95	Budapest, Hungary	25 July 2017
Asian Record	Qin Haiyang (CHN)	26.20	Fukuoka, Japan	25 July 2023
Games Record	Qin Haiyang (CHN)	26.25	Hangzhou, China	29 September 2023

== Results ==
=== Heats ===
Rank	Heat	Athlete	Time	Notes
1	4	Qin Haiyang (CHN)	26.87	Q
2	2	Shin Ohashi (JPN)	27.00	Q
3	4	Liu Junjie (CHN)	27.08	Q
4	4	Amir Motaee (IRI)	27.28	Q, NR
5	3	Denis Petrashov (KGZ)	27.45	Q
6	2	Choi Dong-yeol (KOR)	27.58	Q
7	3	Adam Mak Sai Ting (HKG)	27.71	Q
8	4	Phạm Thành Bảo (VIE)	27.72	Q
9	3	Marrich Somridhivej (THA)	27.73	Q
10	3	Aibat Myrzamuratov (KAZ)	27.86	Q
11	4	Tsui Yik Ki (HKG)	27.86	Reserve
12	4	Chao Man Hou (MAC)	27.98	Reserve
13	4	Lam Chi Chong (MAC)	28.10	
14	3	Yang Yu-xiang (TPE)	28.15	
15	2	Chan Chun Ho (SGP)	28.17	
16	4	Arya Haryono (INA)	28.18	
17	2	Ippei Watanabe (JPN)	28.21	
18	2	Mohamed Mohamed (QAT)	28.24	
19	3	Andrew Goh (MAS)	28.28	
20	2	Chang Chiao-i (TPE)	28.39	
21	3	Danush Suresh (IND)	28.40	
22	2	Zavv Xian Le Lee (SGP)	28.52	
23	3	Samyar Abdoli (IRI)	28.53	
24	3	Rashed Altarmoom (KUW)	28.70	
25	3	Muhammadismail Rahmonov (UZB)	28.74	
26	2	Iskandar Sadullaev (UZB)	28.79	
27	4	Pasawat Kantakom (THA)	28.88	
28	2	Sultan Mansoor M Alotaibi (KSA)	29.07	
29	1	David Akopyan (TKM)	29.28	
30	2	Abdulla Jamal (BRN)	29.71	
=31	4	Mohammed Mansoor Alotaibi (KSA)	29.81	
=31	1	Sok Esarak (CAM)	29.81	
33	1	Sugar Ganzorigt (MGL)	29.97	
34	1	Javkhlan Uuganbaatar (MGL)	30.03	
35	1	Hamza Asif (PAK)	30.47	
36	1	Omar Alhammadi (UAE)	30.64	
37	1	Looth Hussain (MDV)	30.98	
38	1	Jaden Shrestha (NEP)	31.49	
39	1	Fahim Anwari (AFG)	31.86	
40	1	David Kuziev (TJK)	38.15	

=== Final ===
Rank	Athlete	Time	Notes
1st place, gold medalist(s)	Qin Haiyang (CHN)	26.68	
2nd place, silver medalist(s)	Liu Junjie (CHN)	26.99	
3rd place, bronze medalist(s)	Shin Ohashi (JPN)	27.01	
4	Choi Dong-yeol (KOR)	27.12	
5	Denis Petrashov (KGZ)	27.18	
6	Amir Motaee (IRI)	27.46	
7	Adam Mak Sai Ting (HKG)	27.77	
8	Marrich Somridhivej (THA)	27.84	
9	Phạm Thành Bảo (VIE)	27.85	
10	Aibat Myrzamuratov (KAZ)	27.98	
