= Swimming at the 2026 Asian Games – Men's 100 metre breaststroke =

Men's 100 metre breaststroke at the 2026 Asian Games
- Venue: Tokyo Aquatics Centre
- Date: 21 September 2026
- Competitors: 36 from 21 nations

Medalists
gold medal	Dong Zhihao	China
gold medal	Shin Ohashi	Japan
bronze medal	Qin Haiyang	China

The men's 100 metre breaststroke event at the 2026 Asian Games took place on 21 September 2026 at the Tokyo Aquatics Centre. Japan's Shin Ohashi and China's Dong Zhihao shared the gold medal after recording identical times of 58.64 seconds. Defending champion Qin Haiyang of China won the bronze medal in 59.01 seconds.

== Schedule ==
All times are Japan Standard Time (UTC+09:00)

Date	Time	Event
Monday, 21 September 2026	10:36	Heats
Monday, 21 September 2026	17:38	Final

== Records ==
Prior to this competition, the existing world, Asian and Games records were as follows.

World Record	Adam Peaty (GBR)	56.88	Gwangju, South Korea	21 July 2019
Asian Record	Qin Haiyang (CHN)	57.69	Fukuoka, Japan	24 July 2023
Games Record	Qin Haiyang (CHN)	57.76	Hangzhou, China	25 September 2023

== Results ==
=== Heats ===
Rank	Heat	Athlete	Time	Notes
1	3	Shin Ohashi (JPN)	59.38	Q
2	3	Choi Dong-yeol (KOR)	59.53	Q
3	4	Qin Haiyang (CHN)	1:00.13	Q
4	2	Denis Petrashov (KGZ)	1:00.22	Q
5	3	Mak Sai Ting Adam (HKG)	1:00.25	Q
6	4	Dong Zhihao (CHN)	1:00.28	Q
7	2	Cheung Chi Kit Nicholas (HKG)	1:00.46	Q
8	3	Amir Motae (IRI)	1:00.66	Q, NR
9	3	Chang Chiao-i (TPE)	1:00.75	Q, NR
10	4	Cho Sung-jae (KOR)	1:00.79	Q
11	2	Phạm Thanh Bảo (VIE)	1:00.85	Reserve
12	4	Aibat Myrzamuratov (KAZ)	1:01.06	Reserve
13	4	Ippei Watanabe (JPN)	1:01.20	
14	4	Tsai Ruei-hong (TPE)	1:01.59	
15	4	Reagan Cheng (SGP)	1:01.67	
16	2	Muhammadismail Rahmonov (UZB)	1:01.91	
17	3	Marrich Somridhivej (THA)	1:01.94	
18	2	Arya Adrean Putra Haryono (INA)	1:02.10	
19	2	Chan Chun Ho (SGP)	1:02.18	
20	2	Chao Man Hou (MAC)	1:02.25	
21	4	Lam Chi Chong (MAC)	1:02.37	
22	2	Danush Suresh (IND)	1:03.46	
23	3	Andrew Goh (MAS)	1:03.50	
24	3	Pasawat Kantakom (THA)	1:03.74	
25	4	Rashed Altarmoom (KUW)	1:04.43	
26	1	David Akopyan (TKM)	1:04.72	
27	3	Enkhmend Enkhmend (MGL)	1:04.81	
28	2	Iskandar Sadullaev (UZB)	1:05.34	
29	3	Abdulla Jamal (BRN)	1:05.77	
30	1	Jaden Shrestha (NEP)	1:08.01	
31	1	Esarak Sok (CAM)	1:08.58	
32	2	Omar Alhammadi (UAE)	1:08.78	
33	4	Gunbileg Tsevegsuren (MGL)	1:10.60	
34	1	Fahim Anwari (AFG)	1:11.06	
35	1	Looth Hussain (MDV)	1:11.69	
36	1	David Kuziev (TJK)	1:23.71	

=== Final ===
Rank	Athlete	Time	Notes
1st place, gold medalist(s)	Dong Zhihao (CHN)	58.64	
1st place, gold medalist(s)	Shin Ohashi (JPN)	58.64	
3rd place, bronze medalist(s)	Qin Haiyang (CHN)	59.01	
4	Denis Petrashov (KGZ)	59.39	
5	Choi Dong-yeol (KOR)	59.46	
6	Mak Sai Ting Adam (HKG)	1:00.22	
7	Amir Motae (IRI)	1:00.57	NR
=7	Chang Chiao-i (TPE)	1:00.57	NR
9	Cheung Chi Kit Nicholas (HKG)	1:00.67	
10	Cho Sung-jae (KOR)	1:00.79	
