= Swimming at the 2026 Asian Games – Men's 4 × 100 metre freestyle relay =

Men's 4 × 100 metre freestyle relay at the 2026 Asian Games
- Venue: Tokyo Aquatics Centre
- Date: 24 September 2026
- Competitors: 52 from 13 nations

Medalists
gold medal	China; Zhao Jiayue, Wang Haoyu, Zhang Zhanshuo, Pan Zhanle, Xu Haibo, Xu Fang
silver medal	South Korea; Hwang Sun-woo, Kim Ji-hun, Yang Jae-hoon, Kim Young-beom, Kim Woo-min, Ji Yu-chan, Lee Ho-joon, Kim Min-seop
bronze medal	Japan; Tatsuya Murasa, Shuya Matsumoto, Katsuhiro Matsumoto, Shoon Mitsunaga, Kazusa Kuroda, Konosuke Yanagimoto, Kazushi Imafuku

The men's 4 × 100 metre freestyle relay event at the 2026 Asian Games took place on 24 September 2026 at the Tokyo Aquatics Centre. China, the defending champions, retained the title in an Asian record time of 3:10.60, improving both China's previous Asian record and the Asian Games record of 3:10.88, set at the 2022 Asian Games. South Korea took the silver in 3:11.69 and Japan won the bronze in 3:11.96.

== Schedule ==
All times are Japan Standard Time (UTC+09:00)

Date	Time	Event
Thursday, 24 September 2026	11:02	Heats
Thursday, 24 September 2026	18:18	Final

== Records ==
Prior to this competition, the existing world, Asian and Games records were as follows.

World Record	United States	3:08.24	Beijing, China	11 August 2008
Asian Record	China	3:10.88	Hangzhou, China	28 September 2023
Games Record	China	3:10.88	Hangzhou, China	28 September 2023

== Results ==
=== Heats ===
Rank	Heat	Team	Time	Notes
1	2	China (CHN)	3:18.76	Q
		Xu Haibo	49.35	
		Zhao Jiayue	49.71	
		Wang Haoyu	49.08	
		Xu Fang	50.62	
2	2	Japan (JPN)	3:19.00	Q
		Shuya Matsumoto	48.47	
		Kazusa Kuroda	49.67	
		Konosuke Yanagimoto	49.50	
		Kazushi Imafuku	51.36	
3	2	Kazakhstan (KAZ)	3:19.46	Q, NR
		Maxim Klimenko	50.38	
		Gleb Kovalenya	49.23	
		Adilbek Mussin	49.67	
		Maxim Skazobtsov	50.18	
4	1	South Korea (KOR)	3:19.55	Q
		Kim Woo-min	50.01	
		Ji Yu-chan	49.78	
		Lee Ho-joon	49.93	
		Kim Min-seop	49.83	
5	1	Thailand (THA)	3:20.07	Q, NR
		Pongpanod Trithan	49.66	
		Surasit Thongdeang	50.45	
		Tonnam Kanteemool	49.80	
		Skye Sharples	50.16	
6	1	Saudi Arabia (KSA)	3:20.81	Q
		Zaid Al Sarraj	50.18	
		Emad Zaben	49.30	
		Mohammed Al Zaki	50.50	
		Ali Hussain Alessa	50.83	
7	1	Singapore (SGP)	3:21.13	Q
		Azman Ardi	50.26	
		Tedd Chan	51.46	
		Glen Jun Wei Lim	49.95	
		Jonathan Tan	49.46	
8	2	Indonesia (INA)	3:21.48	Q
		Kevin Prayitno	50.69	
		Jason Yusuf	50.08	
		Liquor Harrison Andoko	50.68	
		Samuel Septionus	50.03	
9	2	Hong Kong (HKG)	3:21.76	
		Wan Chun Lim	51.36	
		Ian Yentou Ho	49.20	
		Yu Dongqi	50.35	
		Lo Tsz Lam	50.85	
10	1	Malaysia (MAS)	3:22.67	
		Lim Yin Chuen	50.58	
		Arvin Singh	49.22	
		Khiew Hoe Yean	50.32	
		Goh Li Jie	52.55	
11	2	Qatar (QAT)	3:23.13	
		Ali Hassan	48.91	
		Abdalla Elghamry	52.78	
		Emile Fouzai	51.23	
		Mohamed Mohamed	50.21	
12	1	India (IND)	3:23.51	
		Akash Mani	51.22	
		Benedicton Beniston	50.53	
		Heer Gitesh Shah	50.86	
		Aneesh Sunil	50.90	
13	2	Mongolia (MGL)	3:33.25	NR
		Enkhtamir Batbayar	50.58	
		Badmaarag Gantugs	54.30	
		Maidar Gongor	54.77	
		Ninjin Enkhbaatar	53.60	

=== Final ===
Rank	Team	Time	Notes
1st place, gold medalist(s)	China (CHN)	3:10.60	AR
	Zhao Jiayue	48.43	
	Wang Haoyu	47.77	
	Zhang Zhanshuo	47.65	
	Pan Zhanle	46.75	
2nd place, silver medalist(s)	South Korea (KOR)	3:11.69	
	Hwang Sun-woo	47.50	
	Kim Ji-hun	48.70	
	Yang Jae-hoon	48.65	
	Kim Young-beom	46.84	
3rd place, bronze medalist(s)	Japan (JPN)	3:11.96	NR
	Tatsuya Murasa	48.05	
	Shuya Matsumoto	48.30	
	Katsuhiro Matsumoto	47.81	
	Shoon Mitsunaga	47.80	
4	Singapore (SGP)	3:16.93	
	Azman Ardi	49.83	
	Glen Jun Wei Lim	49.80	
	Jonathan Tan	49.08	
	Mikkel Lee	48.22	
5	Kazakhstan (KAZ)	3:17.86	NR
	Adilbek Mussin	50.34	
	Maxim Klimenko	49.81	
	Gleb Kovalenya	48.66	
	Aibat Myrzamuratov	49.05	
6	Thailand (THA)	3:18.73	NR
	Skye Sharples	50.38	
	Tonnam Kanteemool	49.98	
	Surasit Thongdeang	49.70	
	Pongpanod Trithan	48.67	
7	Saudi Arabia (KSA)	3:20.60	
	Zaid Al Sarraj	49.68	
	Emad Zaben	49.35	
	Mohammed Al Zaki	50.90	
	Ali Hussain Alessa	50.67	
8	Indonesia (INA)	3:20.84	NR
	Kevin Prayitno	50.96	
	Jason Yusuf	49.97	
	Liquor Harrison Andoko	50.14	
	Samuel Septionus	49.77	
