= Swimming at the 2025 SEA Games – Men's 200 metre breaststroke =

Men's 200 metre breaststroke at the 2025 SEA Games
- Venue: SAT Swimming Pool
- Date: 14 December
- Competitors: 8 from 6 nations

The men's 200 metre breaststroke event at the 2025 SEA Games will take place on 14 December 2025 at the SAT Swimming Pool in Bangkok, Thailand.

== Schedule ==
All times are Indochina Standard Time (UTC+07:00)

Date	Time	Event
Sunday, 14 December 2025	18:44	Final

== Records ==
Prior to this competition, the existing world, Asian, and Southeast Asian Games records were as follows.

World Record	Qin Haiyang (CHN)	2:05.48	Fukuoka, Japan	28 July 2023
Asian Record	Qin Haiyang (CHN)	2:05.48	Fukuoka, Japan	28 July 2023
Games Record	Phạm Thanh Bảo (VIE)	2:11.45	Phnom Penh, Cambodia	10 May 2023

== Results ==
=== Final ===
Rank	Lane	Swimmer	Nationality	Time	Notes
1st place, gold medalist(s)	4	Phạm Thanh Bảo	Vietnam	2:12.81	
2nd place, silver medalist(s)	6	Chan Chun Ho	Singapore	2:14.82	
3rd place, bronze medalist(s)	5	Maximillian Ang	Singapore	2:15.56	
4	7	Muhammad Dwiky Raharj	Indonesia	2:16.77	
5	3	Rachasil Mahamongkol	Thailand	2:17.35	
6	2	Andrew Goh	Malaysia	2:20.58	
7	1	Thu Lin Myat	Myanmar	2:35.72	
8	8	Khant Phone Min	Myanmar	2:39.08	
