= Swimming at the 2026 Asian Games – Men's 50 metre freestyle =

Men's 50 metre freestyle at the 2026 Asian Games
- Venue: Tokyo Aquatics Centre
- Date: 21 September 2026
- Competitors: 48 from 29 nations

Medalists
gold medal	Kim Young-beom	South Korea
silver medal	Ian Ho	Hong Kong
bronze medal	Ji Yu-chan	South Korea

The men's 50 metre freestyle event at the 2026 Asian Games took place on 21 September 2026 at the Tokyo Aquatics Centre. South Korea's Kim Young-beom won the gold medal in a Games-record time of 21.66 seconds, improving the record he had set in the preliminaries.

== Schedule ==
All times are Japan Standard Time (UTC+09:00)

Date	Time	Event
Monday, 21 September 2026	10:14	Heats
Monday, 21 September 2026	17:12	Final

== Records ==
Prior to this competition, the existing world, Asian and Games records were as follows.

World Record	Cameron McEvoy (AUS)	20.88	Shenzhen, China	20 March 2026
Asian Record	Shuya Matsumoto (JPN)	21.64	Shizuoka, Japan	27 July 2025
Games Record	Ji Yu-chan (KOR)	21.72	Hangzhou, China	25 September 2023

== Results ==
=== Heats ===
Rank	Heat	Athlete	Time	Notes
1	4	Kim Young-beom (KOR)	21.71	Q, GR
2	4	Shuya Matsumoto (JPN)	22.03	Q
3	3	Ji Yu-chan (KOR)	22.23	Q
4	3	Emad Zaben (KSA)	22.24	Q
=4	5	Ian Ho (HKG)	22.24	Q
6	5	Adam Marcel Hofstede (HKG)	22.27	Q
7	5	Chen Hao (CHN)	22.29	Q
8	3	Mikkel Lee (SGP)	22.30	Q
9	4	Gleb Kovalenya (KAZ)	22.34	Q
10	4	Jonathan Tan (SGP)	22.43	Q
11	3	Wang Changhao (CHN)	22.44	Reserve
=11	5	Samyar Abdoli (IRI)	22.44	Reserve
13	5	Ali Hassan (QAT)	22.51	
14	5	Koshiro Sakai (JPN)	22.58	
15	5	Ng Chi Hin (MAC)	22.63	
16	4	Zaid Al-Sarraj (KSA)	22.67	
17	3	Eldorbek Usmonov (UZB)	22.73	
18	4	Adilbek Mussin (KAZ)	22.83	
=18	3	Pongpanod Trithan (THA)	22.83	
20	4	Samuel Septionus (INA)	22.87	
21	4	Lin Yi-cheng (TPE)	22.95	
22	5	Stepan Goncharov (BRN)	23.06	
23	4	Logan Noguchi (PHI)	23.08	
24	3	Yin Chuen Lim (MAS)	23.16	
25	5	Yang Yu-xiang (TPE)	23.37	
26	2	Akash Mani (IND)	23.43	
27	3	Jason Yusuf (INA)	23.45	
28	4	Heer Gitesh Shah (IND)	23.57	
29	1	Alan Muhin (TKM)	23.91	
30	1	Hamza Asif (PAK)	24.04	
31	2	Hamad Alshehhi (UAE)	24.06	
32	5	Enkhtamir Batbayar (MGL)	24.19	
33	3	Abdulrazaq Aldawaihi (KUW)	24.22	
34	2	Abdulla Jamal (BRN)	24.30	
35	2	Jonathan Shaheen (PLE)	24.34	NR
36	2	Disandu Niriella (SRI)	24.35	
37	2	Md Islam (BAN)	24.38	
38	2	Ervin Shrestha (NEP)	24.56	
39	2	Antoine De Lapparent (CAM)	24.68	
40	2	Mahmoud Abugharbia (PLE)	24.94	
41	2	Badmaarag Gantugs (MGL)	25.07	
42	1	Almos Gadoev (TJK)	25.62	
43	1	Esarak Sok (CAM)	26.49	
44	1	Ryuto Saysanavongphet (LAO)	26.82	
45	1	Yusuf Nasser (YEM)	27.13	
46	1	Ahmadjon Kholov (TJK)	27.95	
47	1	Abdullah Barakat (YEM)	28.25	
	3	Yu Jing Tong (MAS)	DNS	

=== Final ===
Rank	Athlete	Time	Notes
1st place, gold medalist(s)	Kim Young-beom (KOR)	21.66	GR
2nd place, silver medalist(s)	Ian Ho (HKG)	21.76	
3rd place, bronze medalist(s)	Ji Yu-chan (KOR)	21.94	
4	Chen Hao (CHN)	22.04	
5	Mikkel Lee (SGP)	22.06	
6	Emad Zaben (KSA)	22.11	
7	Shuya Matsumoto (JPN)	22.17	
=7	Gleb Kovalenya (KAZ)	22.17	
9	Adam Marcel Hofstede (HKG)	22.33	
10	Jonathan Tan (SGP)	22.46	
