= Swimming at the 2026 Asian Games – Men's 100 metre butterfly =

Men's 100 metre butterfly at the 2026 Asian Games
- Venue: Tokyo Aquatics Centre
- Date: 23 September 2026
- Competitors: 34 from 19 nations

Medalists
| gold medal | Shoon Mitsunaga | Japan |
| silver medal | Xu Fang | China |
| bronze medal | Katsuhiro Matsumoto | Japan |

The men's 100 metre butterfly event at the 2026 Asian Games took place on 23 September 2026 at the Tokyo Aquatics Centre.

== Schedule ==
All times are Japan Standard Time (UTC+09:00)

| Date | Time | Event |
|---|---|---|
| Wednesday, 23 September 2026 | 10:09 | Heats |
| Wednesday, 23 September 2026 | 17:08 | Final |

== Records ==
Prior to this competition, the existing world, Asian and Games records were as follows.

| World Record | Caeleb Dressel (USA) | 49.45 | Tokyo, Japan | 31 July 2021 |
| Asian Record | Joseph Schooling (SGP) | 50.39 | Rio de Janeiro, Brazil | 12 August 2016 |
| Games Record | Joseph Schooling (SGP) | 51.04 | Jakarta, Indonesia | 22 August 2018 |

== Results ==
=== Heats ===
| Rank | Heat | Athlete | Time | Notes |
|---|---|---|---|---|
| 1 | 4 | Xu Fang (CHN) | 52.01 | Q |
| 2 | 4 | Katsuhiro Matsumoto (JPN) | 52.07 | Q |
| 3 | 3 | Wang Xizhe (CHN) | 52.15 | Q |
| 4 | 4 | Maxim Skazobtsov (KAZ) | 52.17 | Q |
| 5 | 3 | Yang Jae-hoon (KOR) | 52.19 | Q |
| 6 | 3 | Mikhail Arkhangelskiy (BRN) | 52.40 | Q |
| 7 | 2 | Shoon Mitsunaga (JPN) | 52.54 | Q |
| 8 | 2 | Wang Kuan-hung (TPE) | 52.58 | Q |
| 9 | 4 | Kim Ji-hun (KOR) | 52.62 | Q |
| 10 | 2 | Adilbek Mussin (KAZ) | 52.68 | Q |
| 11 | 3 | Ian Yentou Ho (HKG) | 52.78 | Reserve |
| 12 | 3 | Joe Kurniawan (INA) | 52.89 | Reserve |
| 13 | 2 | Benedicton Beniston (IND) | 53.08 | |
| 14 | 2 | Bryan Xin Ren Leong (MAS) | 54.19 | |
| 15 | 2 | Surasit Thongdeang (THA) | 54.24 | |
| 16 | 2 | Logan Noguchi (PHI) | 54.57 | |
| 17 | 3 | Brandon Yan Xi Yap (SGP) | 54.73 | |
| 18 | 4 | Mohamed Ismail (QAT) | 54.77 | |
| 19 | 3 | Wongsakorn Patsamarn (THA) | 55.17 | |
| 20 | 2 | Nguyễn Việt Tường (VIE) | 55.36 | |
| 21 | 4 | Ralph Yat Ho Koo (HKG) | 55.50 | |
| 22 | 2 | Dương Văn Hoàng Quý (VIE) | 55.57 | |
| 23 | 4 | Mohammad Alotaibi (KUW) | 55.78 | |
| 24 | 2 | Julian Lee (SGP) | 55.90 | |
| 25 | 4 | Jonathan Shaheen (PLE) | 56.08 | NR |
| 26 | 1 | David Akopyan (TKM) | 56.26 | |
| 27 | 3 | Li Jie Goh (MAS) | 56.77 | |
| 28 | 3 | Ninjin Enkhbaatar (MGL) | 56.90 | NR |
| 29 | 4 | Md Islam (BAN) | 58.21 | |
| 30 | 1 | Belgudei Uyanga (MGL) | 59.46 | |
| 31 | 1 | Saddam Ramziyorzoda (TJK) | 1:11.59 | |
| | 1 | Munzer Mark Kabbara (LBN) | DNS | |
| | 3 | Salem Sabt (UAE) | DNS | |
| | 2 | Sajan Prakash (IND) | DNS | |

=== Final ===
| Rank | Athlete | Time | Notes |
|---|---|---|---|
| 1st place, gold medalist(s) | Shoon Mitsunaga (JPN) | 50.56 | GR, NR |
| 2nd place, silver medalist(s) | Xu Fang (CHN) | 50.73 | |
| 3rd place, bronze medalist(s) | Katsuhiro Matsumoto (JPN) | 51.36 | |
| 4 | Mikhail Arkhangelskiy (BRN) | 51.74 | |
| 5 | Yang Jae-hoon (KOR) | 51.83 | |
| 6 | Wang Xizhe (CHN) | 51.87 | |
| 7 | Maxim Skazobtsov (KAZ) | 52.06 | |
| 8 | Wang Kuan-hung (TPE) | 52.33 | |
| 9 | Kim Ji-hun (KOR) | 52.41 | |
| 10 | Adilbek Mussin (KAZ) | 52.70 | |
