= Swimming at the 2025 Summer World University Games – Men's 4 × 100 metre freestyle relay =

Men's 4 × 100 metre freestyle relay at the 2025 Summer World University Games
- Venue: Schwimm- und Sprunghalle im Europasportpark
- Location: Berlin
- Dates: 17 July (heats and final)
- Nations: 26

Medalists
gold medal	Matthew King; Mitchell Schott; Owen McDonald; David King; Camden Taylor	United States
silver medal	Takumi Mori; Takaki Hara; Yuta Watanabe; Konosuke Yanagimoto; Shoon Mitsunaga	Japan
bronze medal	Lucas Peixoto; Kaique Alves; Vinícius Assunção; Pedro Souza; Theo Alloza	Brazil

The men's 4 × 100 metre freestyle relay at the 2025 Summer World University Games in Rhine-Ruhr, Germany was held 17 July 2025. United States won the gold medal, Japan took the silver medal and Brazil earned the bronze medal.

== Schedule ==
All times are Central European Time (UTC+1)

Date	Time	Round
17 July	11:06	Heats
17 July	20:05	Final

== Records ==
Prior to the competition, the world and Universiade records were as follows.

Category	Team	Record	Date	Place	Event
World record	United States	3:08.24	11 August 2008	Beijing, China	2008 Summer Olympics
Universiade record	Russia	3:10.88	10 July 2013	Kazan, Russia	2013 Summer Universiade

== Results ==
=== Heats ===
All entered teams competed across multiple seeded heats in the morning session. Teams with the top 8 fastest times advanced, regardless of which individual heat they swam.

Rank	Heat	Lane	Nation	Swimmers	Time	Notes
1	4	4	United States	Camden Taylor (49.31); Mitchell Schott (48.35); Owen McDonald (48.67); David King (48.44)	3:14.77	Q
2	4	3	Japan	Takaki Hara (49.03); Shoon Mitsunaga (49.10); Yuta Watanabe (48.51); Konosuke Yanagimoto (48.48)	3:15.12	Q
3	4	6	South Africa	Pieter Coetze (48.87); Ruard van Renen (49.12); Arno Kruger (50.93); Guy Brooks (48.69)	3:17.61	Q
4	3	6	Germany	Moritz Schaller (49.94); Philipp Peschke (49.67); Ole Eidam (48.86); Björn Kammann (49.29)	3:17.76	Q
5	3	5	Italy	Luca Serio (49.89); Giovanni Caserta (49.57); Giovanni Guatti (49.32); Lorenzo Actis (49.03)	3:17.81	Q
6	3	1	Australia	Gabriel Gorgas (50.01); Stuart Swinburn (49.51); Thomas Nankervis (50.43); Marcus Da Silva (47.99)	3:17.94	Q
7	3	3	Brazil	Kaique Alves (49.18); Lucas Peixoto (49.66); Theo Alloza (50.62); Vinicius Assunção (49.39)	3:18.85	Q
8	3	2	Sweden	Vidar Carlbaum (50.79); Elias Funch (49.14); Charlie Skoglund (49.35); Erik Falk (49.94)	3:19.22	Q
9	4	7	Switzerland	Tiago Behar (49.58); Robin Yeboah (50.00); Dominic Chtaini (50.68); Daniil Sokolovskiy (50.46)	3:20.72	
10	1	3	Lithuania	Daniil Pancerevas (50.33); Jokūbas Keblys (49.81); Kajus Stankevičius (50.21); Erikas Grigaitis (50.41)	3:20.76	
11	4	5	Individual Neutral Athletes	Dmitrii Zhavoronkov (49.74); Aleksandr Shchegolev (48.09); Nikolai Kolesnikov (52.60); Roman Akimov (50.70)	3:21.13	
12	4	1	Canada	Patrick Hussey (49.58); Phillip Weeks (49.64); Liam Weaver (51.11); Collyn Gagne (51.08)	3:21.41	
13	3	7	Malaysia	Lim Yin Chuen (50.39); Arvin Chahal (49.51); Tan Khai Xin (51.86); Bryan Leong (51.71)	3:23.47	
14	3	4	South Korea	Kim Ji-hun (50.05); Yoon Ji-hwan (50.67); Han Seung-yun (51.72); Kim Min-jun (51.70)	3:24.14	
15	4	8	Estonia	Siim Kesküla (50.68); Artur Tobler (51.67); Oliver Kuulpak (51.82); Lars Kuljus (50.02)	3:24.19	
16	3	8	Hong Kong	Nathan Chan (51.15); Ho Siu Lun (50.61); He Shing Ip (52.76); Hayden Kwan (51.25)	3:25.77	
17	1	4	India	Manickar. Beniston (50.65); Shoan Ganguly (52.24); Aneesh Gowda (52.05); Jashua Thomas (51.74)	3:26.68	
18	2	4	Singapore	Sage Tan (51.89); Brandon Yap (51.86); Kai Lim (52.73); Samuel Tang (51.37)	3:27.85	
19	2	2	Slovakia	Radoslav Polčič (53.48); Jakub Poliačik (51.44); Ondrej Duša (51.43); Phillip Osadský (52.49)	3:28.84	
20	2	3	Latvia	Kristaps Mikelsons (50.75); Jegors Mihailovs (52.67); Rihards Kahanovičs (54.52); Staņislavs Šakels (51.68)	3:29.62	
21	2	6	Azerbaijan	Said Hamidov (53.82); Ramil Valizada (51.80); Rashad Alguliyev (53.75); Abdurrahman Rustamov (51.31)	3:30.68	
22	2	5	Uzbekistan	Mikhail Kleshko (52.28); Roman Berkovich (56.22); Abdulazizbek Abdumajidov (53.03); Eldorbek Usmonov (52.68)	3:34.21	
23	2	1	Ecuador	Carlos Castillo (55.13); Steven Jaramillo (52.01); Emerson Pinto (54.37); Martín Álvarez (52.86)	3:34.37	
24	2	7	Argentina	Nicolas Retrive (52.63); Gianluca Bertotto (56.85); Enzo Macedo (58.27); Agustin Rasche (53.78)	3:41.53	
—	1	5	Oman	—	DNS	
—	4	2	Poland	Konrad Zieliński (50.23); Kacper Klimczak (49.05); Michal Pruszyński; Dominik Dudys	DSQ	

=== Final ===
The fastest 8 teams competed in a single race to determine the gold, silver and bronze medalists.

Rank	Lane	Nation	Swimmers	Time	Notes
1st place, gold medalist(s)	4	United States	Matthew King (48.00); Mitchell Schott (48.15); Owen McDonald (48.46); David King (47.75)	3:12.36	
2nd place, silver medalist(s)	5	Japan	Takumi Mori (49.11); Takaki Hara (47.70); Yuta Watanabe (48.60); Konosuke Yanagimoto (48.78)	3:14.19	
3rd place, bronze medalist(s)	1	Brazil	Lucas Peixoto (49.38); Kaique Alves (47.96); Vinicius Assunção (48.63); Pedro Souza (49.05)	3:15.02	
4	2	Italy	Luca Serio (49.63); Lorenzo Actis (48.20); Giovanni Caserta (48.66); Giovanni Guatti (48.72)	3:15.21	
5	3	South Africa	Pieter Coetze (47.88); Ruard van Renen (48.86); Arno Kruger (51.01); Guy Brooks (47.95)	3:15.70	
6	6	Germany	Moritz Schaller (49.84); Philipp Peschke (48.97); Ole Eidam (48.26); Björn Kammann (49.00)	3:16.07	
7	7	Australia	Gabriel Gorgas (49.48); Stuart Swinburn (49.11); Thomas Nankervis (50.07); Marcus Da Silva (47.73)	3:16.39	
8	8	Sweden	Charlie Skoglund (49.59); Elias Funch (49.86); Erik Falk (49.65); Vidar Carlbaum (50.49)	3:19.59	
