= Swimming at the 2022 Asian Games – Men's 200 metre breaststroke =

Men's 200 metre breaststroke at the 2022 Asian Games
- Venue: Hangzhou Olympic Expo Aquatics Center
- Date: 28 September 2023
- Competitors: 21 from 15 nations

Medalists
gold medal	Qin Haiyang	China
silver medal	Dong Zhihao	China
bronze medal	Ippei Watanabe	Japan

The men's 200 metre breaststroke event at the 2022 Asian Games took place on 28 September 2023 at the Hangzhou Olympic Expo Center.

== Schedule ==
All times are China Standard Time (UTC+08:00)

Date	Time	Event
Thursday, 28 September 2023	10:39	Heats
Thursday, 28 September 2023	19:50	Final

== Records ==
Prior to this competition, the existing world, Asian and Games records were as follows.

World Record	Qin Haiyang (CHN)	2:05.48	Fukuoka, Japan	28 July 2023
Asian Record	Qin Haiyang (CHN)	2:05.48	Fukuoka, Japan	28 July 2023
Games Record	Dmitriy Balandin (KAZ)	2:07.67	Incheon, South Korea	23 September 2014

== Results ==
Legend

- DNS — Did not start

=== Heats ===
Rank	Heat	Athlete	Time	Notes
1	3	Qin Haiyang (CHN)	2:11.76	
2	1	Adam Mak (HKG)	2:12.40	
3	3	Dong Zhihao (CHN)	2:12.52	
4	2	Cho Sung-jae (KOR)	2:12.68	
5	2	Ippei Watanabe (JPN)	2:12.70	
6	1	Shoma Sato (JPN)	2:13.16	
7	1	Adam Chillingworth (HKG)	2:13.57	
8	3	Maximillian Ang (SGP)	2:13.90	
9	3	Phạm Thanh Bảo (VIE)	2:13.99	
10	2	Cai Bing-rong (TPE)	2:15.87	
11	3	Muhammad Dwiky Raharjo (INA)	2:17.81	
12	1	Arsen Kozhakhmetov (KAZ)	2:18.95	
13	2	Munzer Kabbara (LBN)	2:19.41	
14	1	Rachasil Mahamongkol (THA)	2:20.25	
15	2	Hii Puong Wei (MAS)	2:21.36	
16	1	Thanonchai Janruksa (THA)	2:25.14	
17	3	Hamza Shalan (QAT)	2:32.19	
18	3	Lam Chi Chong (MAC)	2:33.66	
19	1	Tsevegsürengiin Günbileg (MGL)	2:37.48	
20	2	Amarsanaagiin Bilegt (MGL)	2:44.69	
—	2	Choi Dong-yeol (KOR)	DNS	

=== Final ===
Rank	Athlete	Time	Notes
1st place, gold medalist(s)	Qin Haiyang (CHN)	2:07.03	GR
2nd place, silver medalist(s)	Dong Zhihao (CHN)	2:08.67	
3rd place, bronze medalist(s)	Ippei Watanabe (JPN)	2:09.91	
4	Cho Sung-jae (KOR)	2:10.49	
5	Adam Mak (HKG)	2:12.46	
6	Adam Chillingworth (HKG)	2:13.03	
7	Maximillian Ang (SGP)	2:13.30	
8	Shoma Sato (JPN)	2:14.06	
