= Swimming at the 2026 Asian Games – Men's 50 metre butterfly =

Men's 50 metre butterfly at the 2026 Asian Games
- Venue: Tokyo Aquatics Centre
- Date: 24 September 2026
- Competitors: 44 from 28 nations

Medalists
gold medal	Mikhail Arkhangelskiy	Bahrain
silver medal	Shoon Mitsunaga	Japan
bronze medal	Wang Changhao	China

The men's 50 metre butterfly event at the 2026 Asian Games took place on 24 September 2026 at the Tokyo Aquatics Centre.

== Schedule ==
All times are Japan Standard Time (UTC+09:00)

Date	Time	Event
Thursday, 24 September 2026	10:08	Heats
Thursday, 24 September 2026	17:05	Final

== Records ==
Prior to this competition, the existing world, Asian and Games records were as follows.

World Record	Andriy Govorov (UKR)	22.27	Rome, Italy	1 July 2018
Asian Record	Mikhail Arkhangelskiy (BHR)	22.91	Saint-Étienne, France	28 June 2026
Games Record	Shoon Mitsunaga (JPN)	23.19	Tokyo, Japan	24 September 2026

== Results ==
=== Heats ===
Rank	Heat	Athlete	Time	Notes
1	4	Shoon Mitsunaga (JPN)	23.19	Q GR
2	5	Mikhail Arkhangelskiy (BRN)	23.23	Q
3	4	Xu Fang (CHN)	23.43	Q
4	5	Yang Jae-hoon (KOR)	23.52	Q
5	3	Eldorbek Usmonov (UZB)	23.58	Q
=6	4	Ng Chi Hin (MAC)	23.63	Q
=6	5	Wang Changhao (CHN)	23.63	Q
8	5	Adilbek Mussin (KAZ)	23.75	Q
9	3	Mikkel Lee (SGP)	23.77	Q
10	4	Teong Tzen Wei (SGP)	23.78	Q
11	4	Katsuhiro Matsumoto (JPN)	23.85	Reserve
12	5	Benedicton Beniston (IND)	23.87	Reserve
=12	3	Maxim Skazobtsov (KAZ)	23.87	
14	3	Ji Yu-chan (KOR)	23.93	
15	5	Joe Kurniawan (INA)	24.03	
16	3	Li Sing Hoi (HKG)	24.30	
17	4	Hofstede Adam Marcel (HKG)	24.40	
18	3	Logan Noguchi (PHI)	24.56	
19	3	Samuel Septionus (INA)	24.62	
20	5	Bryan Xin Ren Leong (MAS)	24.67	
21	4	Mohamed Mohamed (QAT)	24.78	
22	1	David Akopyan (TKM)	24.89	
23	5	Lam Chi Chong (MAC)	25.02	
24	3	Mohamed Ismail (QAT)	25.12	
25	4	Mohamad Zubaid (KUW)	25.28	
26	5	Abdulrazaq Aldawaihi (KUW)	25.31	
27	2	Dương Văn Hoàng Quý (VIE)	25.66	
28	2	Wongsakorn Patsamarn (THA)	25.75	
29	4	Jonathan Shaheen (PLE)	25.76	NR
30	2	Antoine de Lapparent (CAM)	25.82	
31	2	Aviv Pradhan (NEP)	26.05	NR
32	2	Pieter Sok Kha Vanoosten (CAM)	26.09	
33	4	Ahmed Helal (BRN)	26.12	
34	2	Ninjin Enkhbaatar (MGL)	26.13	
35	1	Alan Muhin (TKM)	26.17	
36	5	Hamza Asif (PAK)	26.37	
37	2	Mahmoud Abugharbia (PLE)	26.80	
38	3	Belgudei Uyanga (MGL)	26.87	
39	2	Fakhriddin Madkamov (TJK)	26.94	
40	1	Ryuto Saysanavongphet (LAO)	28.38	
41	1	Yusuf Nasser (YEM)	28.57	
42	2	Fahim Anwari (AFG)	29.13	
43	1	Abdullah Barakat (YEM)	29.97	
44	1	Amin Vaiisov (TJK)	32.38	
	1	Munzer Mark Kabbara (LBN)	DNS	
	4	Salem Sabt (UAE)	DNS	
	0	Tong Yu Jing (MAS)	DNS	

=== Final ===
Rank	Athlete	Time	Notes
1st place, gold medalist(s)	Mikhail Arkhangelskiy (BRN)	22.91	=AR
2nd place, silver medalist(s)	Shoon Mitsunaga (JPN)	23.06	=NR
3rd place, bronze medalist(s)	Wang Changhao (CHN)	23.25	
4	Xu Fang (CHN)	23.32	
5	Teong Tzen Wei (SGP)	23.38	
6	Mikkel Lee (SGP)	23.40	
7	Eldorbek Usmonov (UZB)	23.43	
8	Adilbek Mussin (KAZ)	23.58	
9	Yang Jae-hoon (KOR)	23.60	
10	Ng Chi Hin (MAC)	23.69	
