= Hasan Ali =

Hasan Ali (also spelled Hassan Ali) can refer to:

- Hasan Ali (Kara Koyunlu), last ruler of the Kara Koyunlu Turkmen tribal federation
- Hasan Ali (cricketer), Pakistani cricketer
- Hasan Ali (footballer), United Arab Emirates footballer
- Hasan ibn Ali, grandson of the Islamic prophet Muhammad
- Hasan Ali Khan, Indian businessman
- Hassan Ali Mehran (born 1937), Iranian economist
- Hasan Mohamed Ali, Malaysian politician
- Kamal Hassan Ali, Egyptian politician
- Hassan Ali (kabaddi), Pakistani kabaddi player
- Hassan Ali (East Pakistan politician), a member of the 3rd National Assembly of Pakistan as a representative of East Pakistan
- Hassan Ali (Punjab politician), member of the Provincial Assembly of the Punjab
- Hassan Ali, son of the fictional Indian R&AW agent Tiger in the YRF Spy Universe, portrayed by Jineet Rath and Vishal Jethwa

== Geography ==
- Hasan Ali, Iran, a village in South Khorasan Province, Iran
- Qal'eh Hasan Ali, volcanic field in Iran

== See also ==
- Hassan Aly, Malagasy politician
- Ali Hassan (disambiguation)
