= List of Palestinian records in swimming =

The Palestinian records in swimming are the fastest ever performances of swimmers from Palestine, which are recognised and ratified by the Palestinian Swimming Federation and Aquatic Sports.

All records were set in finals unless noted otherwise.

== Long Course (50 m) ==
=== Men ===
Event	Time		Name	Club	Date	Meet	Location	Ref
50 m freestyle	24.34	h	Jonathan Shaheen	Palestine	21 September 2026	Asian Games	Tokyo, Japan	
100 m freestyle	52.01	h	Yazan Al-Bawwab	Palestine	26 July 2023	World Championships	Fukuoka, Japan	
200 m freestyle	1:56.37	h	Mahmoud Gharbieh	Palestine	24 July 2023	World Championships	Fukuoka, Japan	
400 m freestyle	4:07.70	h	Ahmad M. T. Jebril	Palestine	28 July 2013	World Championships	Barcelona, Spain	
800 m freestyle								
1500 m freestyle								
50 m backstroke	26.72		Yazan Al-Bawwab	Palestine	7 July 2023	Pan Arab Games	Oran, Algeria	
100 m backstroke	57.10		Yazan Al-Bawwab	Palestine	5 July 2023	Pan Arab Games	Oran, Algeria	
200 m backstroke								
50 m breaststroke	30.58		Mohamed Abujiba	Palestine	9 July 2023	Pan Arab Games	Oran, Algeria	
100 m breaststroke	1:08.75		Mohamed Abujiba	Palestine	5 July 2023	Pan Arab Games	Oran, Algeria	
200 m breaststroke	2:50.51		Antonio Habis	Palestine	7 August 2019	Arab Junior Championships	Casablanca, Morocco	
50 m butterfly	25.76	h	Jonathan Shaheen	Palestine	24 September 2026	Asian Games	Tokyo, Japan	
100 m butterfly	56.08	h	Jonathan Shaheen	Palestine	23 September 2026	Asian Games	Tokyo, Japan	
200 m butterfly								
200 m individual medley								
400 m individual medley								
4×100 m freestyle relay	3:38.37		Mahmoud Abu Gharbieh (53.26); Mustafa Abdo (54.21); Mohamed Abujiba (57.98); Yazan Al-Bawwab (52.92)	Palestine	5 July 2023	Pan Arab Games	Oran, Algeria	
4×200 m freestyle relay								
4×100 m medley relay								

Legend: # – Record awaiting ratification by Palestinian Swimming Federation and Aquatic Sports; WR – World record; AS – Asian record; e – equalled existing record;
Records not set in finals: h – heat; sf – semifinal; r – relay 1st leg; rh – relay heat 1st leg; b – B final; † – en route to final mark; so – swim-off; tt – time trial

=== Women ===
Event	Time		Name	Club	Date	Meet	Location	Ref
50 m freestyle	28.29	h	Sabine Hazboun	Palestine	3 August 2013	World Championships	Barcelona, Spain	
100 m freestyle	1:02.45		Farah Fares	Hydra Aquatics	16 February 2024	Dubai Open Championships	Dubai, United Arab Emirates	
200 m freestyle	2:13.69	h	Farah Fares	Palestine	21 September 2026	Asian Games	Tokyo, Japan	
400 m freestyle	4:45.78		Farah Fares	Hydra Aquatics	16 February 2024	Dubai Open Championships	Dubai, United Arab Emirates	
800 m freestyle	9:56.58		Farah Fares	Hydra Aquatics	30 April 2026	Vortex International Championships	Doha, Qatar	
1500 m freestyle								
50 m backstroke	29.78		Valerie Tarazi	Palestine	8 July 2023	Pan Arab Games	Oran, Algeria	
100 m backstroke	1:04.22		Valerie Tarazi	Palestine	5 July 2023	Pan Arab Games	Oran, Algeria	
200 m backstroke	2:24.62	h	Valerie Tarazi	Palestine	22 September 2026	Asian Games	Tokyo, Japan	
50 m breaststroke	32.79		Valerie Tarazi	Palestine	5 July 2023	Pan Arab Games	Oran, Algeria	
100 m breaststroke	1:13.24		Valerie Tarazi	Palestine	7 July 2023	Pan Arab Games	Oran, Algeria	
200 m breaststroke	2:38.67		Valerie Tarazi	Palestine	10 July 2023	Pan Arab Games	Oran, Algeria	
50 m butterfly	27.65		Valerie Tarazi	Palestine	7 July 2023	Pan Arab Games	Oran, Algeria	
100 m butterfly								
200 m butterfly								
200 m individual medley	2:20.57	h	Valerie Tarazi	Palestine	25 September 2023	Asian Games	Hangzhou, China	
400 m individual medley								
4×100 m freestyle relay								
4×200 m freestyle relay								
4×100 m medley relay								

Legend: # – Record awaiting ratification by Palestinian Swimming Federation and Aquatic Sports; WR – World record; AS – Asian record; e – equalled existing record;
Records not set in finals: h – heat; sf – semifinal; r – relay 1st leg; rh – relay heat 1st leg; b – B final; † – en route to final mark; so – swim-off; tt – time trial

== Short Course (25 m) ==
=== Men ===
Event	Time		Name	Club	Date	Meet	Location	Ref
50 m freestyle	24.51	†	Yazan Al-Bawwab	Speedo Swim Squads	26 November 2023	Speedo Invitational Meet	Dubai, United Arab Emirates	
100 m freestyle	50.76		Yazan Al-Bawwab	Speedo Swim Squads	26 November 2023	Speedo Invitational Meet	Dubai, United Arab Emirates	
200 m freestyle	1:53.36		Yazan Al-Bawwab	Speedo Swim Squads	25 November 2023	Speedo Invitational Meet	Dubai, United Arab Emirates	
400 m freestyle								
800 m freestyle								
1500 m freestyle								
50 m backstroke	25.50		Yazan Al-Bawwab	Speedo Swim Squads	26 November 2023	Speedo Invitational Meet	Dubai, United Arab Emirates	
100 m backstroke	55.52	h	Yazan Al-Bawwab	Palestine	5 November 2022	World Cup	Indianapolis, United States	
200 m backstroke	2:12.18		Yazan Al-Bawwab	Speedo Swim Squads	26 November 2023	Speedo Invitational Meet	Dubai, United Arab Emirates	
50 m breaststroke	28.76	h	Mohamed Abujiba	Palestine	14 December 2024	World Championships	Budapest, Hungary	
100 m breaststroke	1:04.73	h	Mohamed Abujiba	Palestine	11 December 2024	World Championships	Budapest, Hungary	
200 m breaststroke	2:37.48	h	Antonio Habis	Palestine	27 November 2020	23rd Speedo Invitational	Dubai, United Arab Emirates	
50 m butterfly	25.23	h	Yazan Al-Bawwab	Palestine	5 November 2022	World Cup	Indianapolis, United States	
100 m butterfly								
200 m butterfly								
100 m individual medley	1:10.85	h	Fouad Alatrash	Palestine	12 April 2008	World Championships	Manchester, Great Britain	
200 m individual medley								
400 m individual medley								
4×50 m freestyle relay								
4×100 m freestyle relay								
4×200 m freestyle relay								
4×50 m medley relay								
4×100 m medley relay								

Legend: # – Record awaiting ratification by Palestinian Swimming Federation and Aquatic Sports; WR – World record; AS – Asian record; e – equalled existing record;
Records not set in finals: h – heat; sf – semifinal; r – relay 1st leg; rh – relay heat 1st leg; b – B final; † – en route to final mark; so – swim-off; tt – time trial

=== Women ===
Event	Time		Name	Club	Date	Meet	Location	Ref
50 m freestyle	27.57	h	Marina Abu Shamaleh	Palestine	20 December 2021	World Championships	Abu Dhabi, United Arab Emirates	
100 m freestyle	1:01.29	h	Sabine Hazboun	Palestine	3 July 2013	Asian Indoor and Martial Arts Games	Incheon, South Korea	
200 m freestyle	2:08.70		Farah Fares	Vortex	17 October 2026	Hamilton Aquatics Meet	Dubai, United Arab Emirates	
400 m freestyle	4:34.89		Farah Fares	Vortex	18 October 2026	Hamilton Aquatics Meet	Dubai, United Arab Emirates	
800 m freestyle	9:27.27		Farah Fares	Vortex	17 October 2026	Hamilton Aquatics Meet	Dubai, United Arab Emirates	
1500 m freestyle								
50 m backstroke	28.94	h	Valerie Tarazi	Palestine	17 October 2025	World Cup	Westmont, United States	
100 m backstroke	1:01.80	h	Valerie Tarazi	Palestine	18 October 2025	World Cup	Westmont, United States	
200 m backstroke	2:26.07		Farah Fares	Vortex	18 October 2026	Hamilton Aquatics Meet	Dubai, United Arab Emirates	
50 m breaststroke	31.67	h	Valerie Tarazi	Palestine	14 December 2024	World Championships	Budapest, Hungary	
100 m breaststroke	1:10.49	h	Marina Abu Shamaleh	Palestine	18 October 2025	World Cup	Westmont, United States	
200 m breaststroke	2:43.86		Marina Abu Shamaleh	Palestine	11 August 2024	Queensland Championships	Brisbane, Australia	
50 m butterfly	28.03	h	Valerie Tarazi	Palestine	18 October 2025	World Cup	Westmont, United States	
100 m butterfly								
200 m butterfly								
100 m individual medley	1:02.00	h	Valerie Tarazi	Palestine	12 December 2024	World Championships	Budapest, Hungary	
200 m individual medley	2:19.34	h	Valerie Tarazi	Palestine	19 October 2025	World Cup	Westmont, United States	
400 m individual medley								
4×50 m freestyle relay								
4×100 m freestyle relay								
4×200 m freestyle relay								
4×50 m medley relay								
4×100 m medley relay								

Legend: # – Record awaiting ratification by Palestinian Swimming Federation and Aquatic Sports; WR – World record; AS – Asian record; e – equalled existing record;
Records not set in finals: h – heat; sf – semifinal; r – relay 1st leg; rh – relay heat 1st leg; b – B final; † – en route to final mark; so – swim-off; tt – time trial
