= Ali Hassan =

Ali Hassan or Ali Hasan may refer to:

== Places ==
- Ali Hasan, Iran

== People ==
- Ali Hasan, an eleven-year-old Bahraini boy arrested for allegedly participating in a protest during the 2011 Bahraini uprising; see Arrest of Ali Hasan
- Ali Hasan (born 1965), Kuwaiti Olympic fencer
- Alihassan Turabi (born 1972), Indian actor
- Ali Hassan (comedian), Canadian comedian
- Ali Hassan (footballer) (1964–2026), Mozambican footballer
- Ali Said Hassan (born 1950), Somali film producer and director
- Ali Hassan or SypherPK (born 1996), American streamer and YouTuber
- Ali Hassan, fictional character portrayed by Ali Zafar in the 2010 Indian film Tere Bin Laden
- Ali Hasan (cricketer) (born 2002), Italian cricketer

== See also ==
- Aly Hassan (born 1989), American professional soccer player
- Hasan Ali (disambiguation)
