= Konosuke Yanagimoto =

Japanese swimmer (born 2003)

Personal information
- Nationality: Japanese
- Born: 24 November 2003 (age 22) Imari, Japan

Sport
- Sport: Swimming
Medal record
Men's swimming
Representing Japan
Asian Games
Silver medal – second place	2026 Aichi–Nagoya	4×200 m freestyle
Bronze medal – third place	2026 Aichi–Nagoya	4×100 m freestyle
World University Games
Gold medal – first place	2021 Chengdu	4×200 m freestyle
Silver medal – second place	2025 Rhine-Ruhr	4×100 m freestyle
Silver medal – second place	2025 Rhine-Ruhr	4×100 m mixed freestyle
Bronze medal – third place	2021 Chengdu	4×100 m medley
Bronze medal – third place	2025 Rhine-Ruhr	4×200 m freestyle

Konosuke Yanagimoto (柳本幸之介, Yanagimoto Kōnosuke, born 24 November 2003) is a Japanese swimmer. He competed in the men's 4 × 200 metre freestyle relay at the 2020 Summer Olympics.
