= Swimming at the 2022 Asian Games – Men's 50 metre freestyle =

Men's 50 metre freestyle at the 2022 Asian Games
- Venue: Hangzhou Olympic Expo Aquatics Center
- Date: 25 September 2023
- Competitors: 43 from 28 nations

Medalists
gold medal	Ji Yu-chan	South Korea
silver medal	Ian Ho	Hong Kong
bronze medal	Pan Zhanle	China

The men's 50 metre freestyle event at the 2022 Asian Games took place on 25 September 2023 at the Hangzhou Olympic Expo Center.

== Schedule ==
All times are China Standard Time (UTC+08:00)

Date	Time	Event
Monday, 25 September 2023	10:22	Heats
Monday, 25 September 2023	19:42	Final

== Records ==
Prior to this competition, the existing world, Asian and Games records were as follows.

World Record	César Cielo (BRA)	20.91	São Paulo, Brazil	18 December 2009
Asian Record	Shinri Shioura (JPN)	21.67	Tokyo, Japan	7 April 2019
Games Record	Ning Zetao (CHN)	21.94	Incheon, South Korea	23 September 2014

== Results ==
Legend

- DSQ — Disqualified

=== Heats ===
Rank	Heat	Athlete	Time	Notes
1	5	Ji Yu-chan (KOR)	21.84	GR
2	6	Ian Ho (HKG)	22.07	
3	5	Jonathan Tan (SGP)	22.15	
4	6	Shinri Shioura (JPN)	22.30	
5	6	Pan Zhanle (CHN)	22.47	
6	5	Wang Changhao (CHN)	22.48	
7	4	Katsumi Nakamura (JPN)	22.52	
8	4	Baek In-chul (KOR)	22.68	
8	4	Teong Tzen Wei (SGP)	22.68	
10	5	Samyar Abdoli (IRI)	22.80	
11	6	Matthew Abeysinghe (SRI)	23.10	
11	4	Tonnam Kanteemool (THA)	23.10	
13	6	Virdhawal Khade (IND)	23.12	
14	6	Tsui Wai Chi (HKG)	23.32	
15	5	Matin Sohran (IRI)	23.47	
16	4	Dulyawat Kaewsriyong (THA)	23.49	
17	4	Waleed Abdulrazzaq (KUW)	23.52	
18	5	Anand A. S. (IND)	23.54	
19	5	Bryan Leong (MAS)	23.55	
20	4	Joe Kurniawan (INA)	23.67	
21	5	Jarod Hatch (PHI)	23.77	
22	3	Musa Jalaýew (TKM)	23.80	
23	6	Tameem El-Hamayda (QAT)	23.87	
24	1	Nguyễn Hoàng Khang (VIE)	24.03	
25	4	Alexander Shah (NEP)	24.15	
26	3	Ng Chi Hin (MAC)	24.30	
27	3	Issa Al-Adawi (OMA)	24.33	
28	6	Batbayaryn Enkhtamir (MGL)	24.43	
28	3	Ahmed Diab (QAT)	24.43	
30	3	Antoine de Lapparent (CAM)	24.53	
31	3	Arslan Gaýypnazarow (TKM)	24.84	
32	2	Mahmoud Abugharbia (PLE)	24.89	
33	2	Montross Phansovannarun (CAM)	24.91	
34	3	Rentsendorjiin Tamir (MGL)	25.00	
35	3	Muhammad Ahmed Durrani (PAK)	25.05	
36	2	Ardasher Gadoev (TJK)	25.36	
37	2	Santisouk Inthavong (LAO)	25.85	
38	2	Muhammad Hamza Anwar (PAK)	26.16	
39	2	Slava Sihanouvong (LAO)	26.51	
40	2	Ali Imaan (MDV)	26.57	
41	1	Fahim Anwari (AFG)	27.16	
42	2	Ahmadjon Kholov (TJK)	27.39	
—	1	Jolanio Guterres (TLS)	DSQ	

=== Swim-off ===
Rank	Athlete	Time	Notes
1	Teong Tzen Wei (SGP)	22.24	
2	Baek In-chul (KOR)	22.39	

=== Final ===
Rank	Athlete	Time	Notes
1st place, gold medalist(s)	Ji Yu-chan (KOR)	21.72	GR
2nd place, silver medalist(s)	Ian Ho (HKG)	21.87	
3rd place, bronze medalist(s)	Pan Zhanle (CHN)	21.92	
4	Jonathan Tan (SGP)	22.11	
5	Katsumi Nakamura (JPN)	22.20	
6	Teong Tzen Wei (SGP)	22.26	
7	Wang Changhao (CHN)	22.29	
8	Shinri Shioura (JPN)	22.35	
