= Shin Ohashi =

Japanese swimmer (born 2009)

Personal information
- Full name: Shin Ohashi
- Nationality: Japan
- Born: 5 March 2009 (age 17) Hirakata, Osaka, Japan
- Height: 1.69 m (5 ft 6 in)

Sport
- Sport: Swimming
- Strokes: Breaststroke
Medal record
Men's swimming
Representing Japan
Asian Games
Gold medal – first place	2026 Aichi–Nagoya	100 m breaststroke
Gold medal – first place	2026 Aichi–Nagoya	200 m breaststroke
Silver medal – second place	2026 Aichi–Nagoya	4×100 m medley
Silver medal – second place	2026 Aichi-Nagoya	4×100 m mixed medley
Bronze medal – third place	2026 Aichi–Nagoya	50 m breaststroke
Pan Pacific Championships
Silver medal – second place	2026 Irvine	100 m breaststroke
Bronze medal – third place	2026 Irvine	200 m breaststroke
Bronze medal – third place	2026 Irvine	4×100 m medley
World Junior Championships
Gold medal – first place	2025 Otopeni	4×100 m medley
Gold medal – first place	2025 Otopeni	4×100 m mixed medley
Silver medal – second place	2025 Otopeni	100 m breaststroke
Silver medal – second place	2025 Otopeni	200 m breaststroke
Bronze medal – third place	2025 Otopeni	50 m breaststroke
Junior Pan Pacific Championships
Gold medal – first place	2024 Canberra	100 m breaststroke
Gold medal – first place	2024 Canberra	200 m breaststroke
Bronze medal – third place	2024 Canberra	4×100 m mixed medley

Shin Ohashi (大橋 信, Ōhashi Shin; born 5 March 2009) is a Japanese swimmer specializing in breaststroke. At the 2026 Pan Pacific Swimming Championships, he broke his own junior world record to win silver in the 100 metres breaststroke. He also holds the world record in the 200 metres breaststroke.

He was named the 2025 Male World Junior Swimmer of the Year by Swimming World, for his performances including five medals at the 2025 World Aquatics Junior Swimming Championships. Ohashi became the Japanese national champion in all three breaststroke events at age 17, the youngest ever to do so.

At the 2026 Asian Games, Ohashi broke the world record in the 200 metre breaststroke, finishing in 2:04.83. He became the youngest male swimmer to break an individual long-course world record since Michael Phelps in 2002.
