= List of Eritrean records in swimming =

The Eritrean records in swimming are the fastest ever performances of swimmers from Eritrea, which are recognised and ratified by the Eritrean National Swimming Federation.

All records were set in finals unless noted otherwise.

== Long Course (50 m) ==
=== Men ===
Event	Time		Name	Club	Date	Meet	Location	Ref
50 m freestyle	23.86	h	Aaron Owusu	Eritrea	15 August 2026	Pan Pacific Championships	Irvine, United States	
100 m freestyle	53.84	h	Aaron Owusu	Eritrea	13 August 2026	Pan Pacific Championships	Irvine, United States	
200 m freestyle	2:44.84	†	Solomon Beraki	Eritrea	21 August 2019	African Games	Casablanca, Morocco	
400 m freestyle	5:54.56	†	Solomon Beraki	Eritrea	21 August 2019	African Games	Casablanca, Morocco	
800 m freestyle	12:11.63		Solomon Beraki	Eritrea	21 August 2019	African Games	Casablanca, Morocco	
1500 m freestyle								
50 m backstroke								
100 m backstroke								
200 m backstroke								
50m breaststroke								
100m breaststroke								
200 m breaststroke								
50 m butterfly	24.97	h	Aaron Owusu	Eritrea	12 August 2026	Pan Pacific Championships	Irvine, United States	
100 m butterfly	58.17	h	Aaron Owusu	Eritrea	14 August 2026	Pan Pacific Championships	Irvine, United States	
200 m butterfly								
200 m individual medley								
400 m individual medley								
4×100 m freestyle relay								
4×200 m freestyle relay								
4×100 m medley relay								

Legend: # – Record awaiting ratification by Gambia Swimming & Aquatic Sports Association; WR – World record; AF – African record;
Records not set in finals: h – heat; sf – semifinal; r – relay 1st leg; rh – relay heat 1st leg; b – B final; † – en route to final mark; so – swim-off; tt – time trial

=== Women ===
Event	Time		Name	Club	Date	Meet	Location	Ref
50 m freestyle	27.91	h, †	Christina Rach	Eritrea	20 August 2025	World Junior Championships	Otopeni, Romania	
100 m freestyle	59.23	h	Christina Rach	Eritrea	20 August 2025	World Junior Championships	Otopeni, Romania	
200 m freestyle								
400 m freestyle								
800 m freestyle								
1500 m freestyle								
50 m backstroke								
100 m backstroke								
200 m backstroke								
50 m breaststroke								
100 m breaststroke								
200 m breaststroke								
50 m butterfly	40.98	h	Hearmela Melke	Eritrea	10 March 2024	African Games	Accra, Ghana	
100 m butterfly								
200 m butterfly								
200 m individual medley								
400 m individual medley								
4×100 m freestyle relay								
4×200 m freestyle relay								
4×100 m medley relay								

Legend: # – Record awaiting ratification by Gambia Swimming & Aquatic Sports Association; WR – World record; AF – African record;
Records not set in finals: h – heat; sf – semifinal; r – relay 1st leg; rh – relay heat 1st leg; b – B final; † – en route to final mark; so – swim-off; tt – time trial

== Short Course (25 m) ==
=== Men ===
Event	Time	Name	Club	Date	Meet	Location	Ref
50m freestyle							
100 m freestyle							
200 m freestyle							
400 m freestyle							
800 m freestyle							
1500 m freestyle							
50m backstroke							
100m backstroke							
200m backstroke							
50m breaststroke							
100m breaststroke							
200 m breaststroke							
50m butterfly							
100 m butterfly							
200 m butterfly							
100 m individual medley							
200 m individual medley							
400 m individual medley							
4×50 m freestyle relay							
4×100 m freestyle relay							
4×200 m freestyle relay							
4×50 m medley relay							
4×100 m medley relay							

Legend: # – Record awaiting ratification by Gambia Swimming & Aquatic Sports Association; WR – World record; AF – African record;
Records not set in finals: h – heat; sf – semifinal; r – relay 1st leg; rh – relay heat 1st leg; b – B final; † – en route to final mark; so – swim-off; tt – time trial

=== Women ===
Event	Time	Name	Club	Date	Meet	Location	Ref
50 m freestyle	28.17	Christina Rach	Eritrea	25 November 2023	Africa Aquatics Zone III Championships	Kigali, Rwanda	
100 m freestyle							
200 m freestyle							
400 m freestyle							
800 m freestyle							
1500 m freestyle							
50m backstroke							
100 m backstroke							
200 m backstroke							
50 m breaststroke							
100 m breaststroke							
200 m breaststroke							
50 m butterfly							
100 m butterfly							
200 m butterfly							
100 m individual medley							
200 m individual medley							
400 m individual medley							
4×50 m freestyle relay							
4×100 m freestyle relay							
4×200 m freestyle relay							
4×50 m medley relay							
4×100 m medley relay							

Legend: # – Record awaiting ratification by Gambia Swimming & Aquatic Sports Association; WR – World record; AF – African record;
Records not set in finals: h – heat; sf – semifinal; r – relay 1st leg; rh – relay heat 1st leg; b – B final; † – en route to final mark; so – swim-off; tt – time trial
