= Dong Zhihao =

Chinese swimmer (born 2005)

Dong Zhihao 董志豪
Personal information
- Nationality: Chinese
- Born: 31 March 2005 (age 21) Xuzhou, Jiangsu, China

Sport
- Sport: Swimming
- Strokes: Breaststroke
Medal record
Men's swimming
Representing China
World Championships (LC)
Gold medal – first place	2024 Doha	200 m breaststroke
Silver medal – second place	2025 Singapore	4×100 m mixed medley
Asian Games
Gold medal – first place	2026 Aichi–Nagoya	100 m breaststroke
Gold medal – first place	2026 Aichi-Nagoya	4×100 m medley
Gold medal – first place	2026 Aichi-Nagoya	4×100 m mixed medley
Silver medal – second place	2022 Hangzhou	200 m breaststroke

Dong Zhihao (born 31 March 2005) is a Chinese swimmer, who holds the world junior record in the 200-meter breaststroke.

He won the gold medal in the 200-meter breaststroke at the 2024 World Championships in Doha, Qatar.

== Personal bests ==
As of 16 Feb 2024

=== Long course (50 m) ===
Event	Time	Meet	Date	Note(s)
50 m breaststroke	27.58	2023 Chinese National Championships	6 May 2023	
100 m breaststroke	59.73	2023 Chinese National Swimming Championships	10 December 2023	
200 m breaststroke	2:07.94	2024 World Championships	16 February 2024	
50 m butterfly	26.20	2023 World Aquatics Swimming World Cup	21 October 2023	
100 m butterfly	56.66	2023 Chinese Spring National Championships	22 March 2023	
200 m butterfly	2:03.81	2024 Chinese National Summer Swimming Championships	25 August 2024	
200 m individual medley	2:03.41	2023 World Aquatics Swimming World Cup	7 October 2023	
400 m individual medley	4:28.20	2021 Chinese National Summer Championships	31 May 2021	
