= Hasan Ali, Iran =

Hasan Ali حسنعلي
- Village
- Country: Iran
- Province: South Khorasan
- County: Nehbandan
- Bakhsh: Shusef
- Rural District: Shusef

Population (2006)
  - Total: 31
- Time zone: UTC+3:30 (IRST)
  - Summer (DST): UTC+4:30 (IRDT)

Hasan Ali (Persian: حسنعلي, also Romanized as Ḩasan ʿAlī) is a village in Shusef Rural District, Shusef District, Nehbandan County, South Khorasan Province, Iran. At the 2006 census, its population was 31, in 7 families.
