= Wang Hao-yu =

Taiwanese politician

- 王浩宇
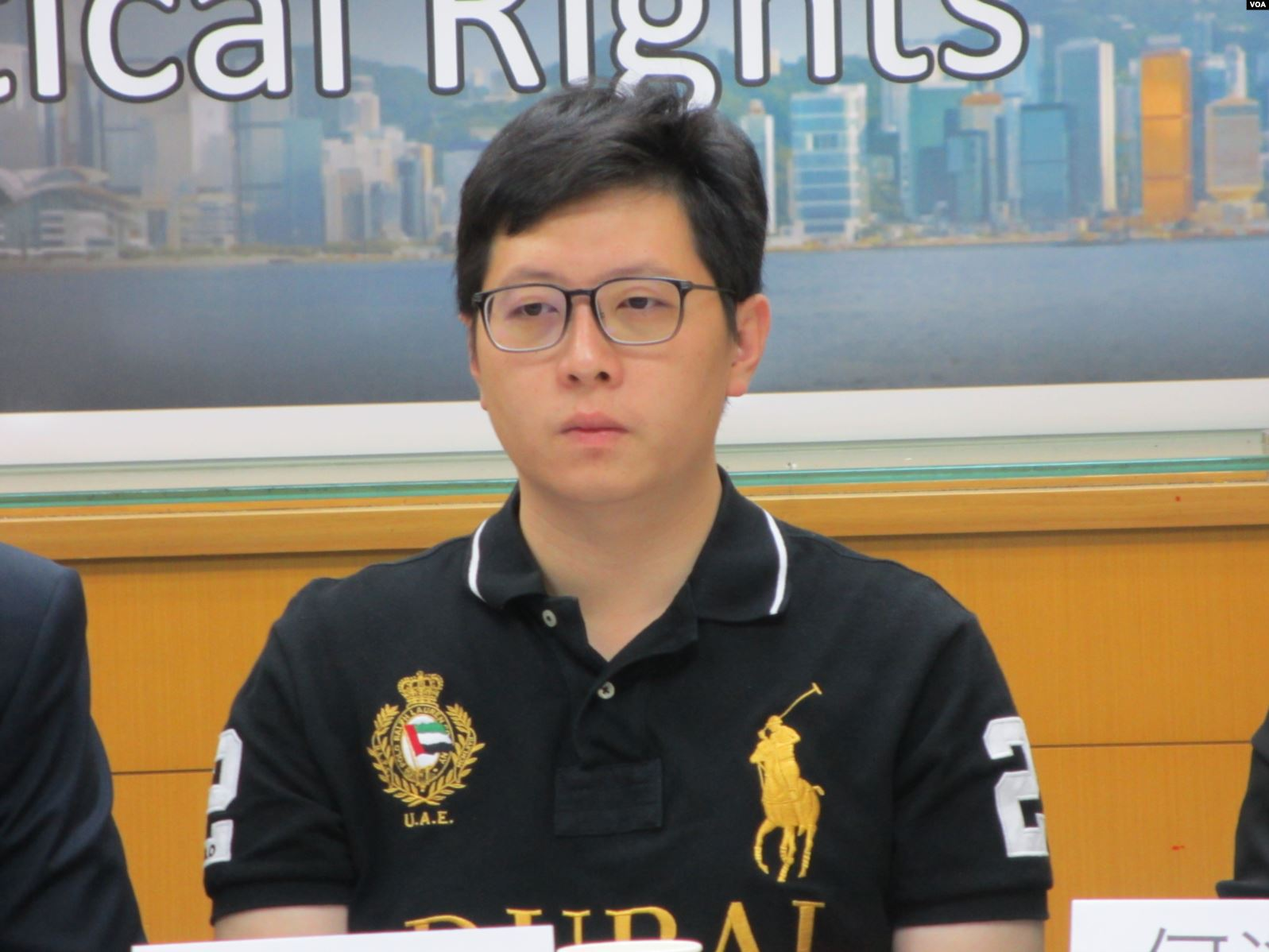

Councillor for District 7 (Zhongli)
- In office 25 December 2014 – 16 January 2021
- Constituency: Taoyuan 7

Personal details
- Born: 29 October 1988 (age 37) Hsinchu, Taiwan
- Party: Democratic Progressive Party; Green Party (2010–2020)

Chinese name
- Chinese: 王浩宇
Transcriptions
Standard Mandarin
- Hanyu Pinyin: Wáng Hàoyǔ

Wang Hao-yu (Chinese: 王浩宇; born 29 October 1988) is a Taiwanese politician.

In the 2014 Taiwanese local elections, he ran for a seat on the Taoyuan City Council in District 7, which includes Zhongli District, as a candidate for the Green Party. Out of 22 candidates, he was one of 10 elected, garnering 9.06% of the votes, the 2nd most amongst all candidates. In 2018 he ran in the same district as a candidate, still under the Green Party, and was one of 11 elected out of 21, coming in 3rd with 8.68% of the vote.

He left the Green Party on January 11, 2020, and joined the Democratic Progressive Party on February 6, 2020.

Wang was the subject of controversy over a Facebook post in the wake of the suicide of Hsu Kun-yuan, the Kaohsiung City Council speaker and ally of Han Kuo-yu, following Han's successful recall. About 200 Han supporters protested outside Wang's district office to call for his recall.

Wang was successfully recalled on January 16, 2021, with 92.23% in favor, 7.7% against, and a 28% turnout. Thus, the number of votes in favor of his recall was 25.82% of eligible voters, exceeding the required 25%. The successful recall was the first for a city councillor in a special municipality. According to ROC law, Wang would be banned from running for the same post over the next four years.
