= Ali Hasan-e Olya =

Ali Hasan-e Olya علي حسن عليا
- Village
- Location within Iran
- Coordinates: 34°27′51″N 46°33′12″E
- Country: Iran
- Province: Kermanshah
- County: Kermanshah
- Bakhsh: Kuzaran
- Rural District: Sanjabi

Population (2006)
  - Total: 46
- Time zone: UTC+3:30 (IRST)
  - Summer (DST): UTC+4:30 (IRDT)

Ali Hasan-e Olya (Persian: علي حسن عليا, also Romanized as ‘Alī Ḩasan-e ‘Olyā) is a village in Sanjabi Rural District, Kuzaran District, Kermanshah County, Kermanshah Province, Iran. At the 2006 census, its population was 46, in 11 families.
