= Ippei Watanabe =

Ippei Watanabe may refer to:

- Ippei Watanabe (footballer) (渡辺 一平, born 1969), Japanese footballer
- Ippei Watanabe (swimmer) (渡辺 一平, born 1997), Japanese swimmer
