= Ji Yu-chan =

South Korean swimmer (born 2002)

Personal information
- Born: 24 August 2002 (age 24) Gwangju, South Korea

Sport
- Sport: Swimming
Medal record
Men's swimming
Representing South Korea
Asian Games
Gold medal – first place	2022 Hangzhou	50 m freestyle
Silver medal – second place	2022 Hangzhou	4×100 m freestyle relay
Silver medal – second place	2026 Aichi–Nagoya	4×100 m freestyle
Bronze medal – third place	2026 Aichi–Nagoya	50 m freestyle

Ji Yu-chan (Korean: 지유찬; born 24 August 2002) is a South Korean swimmer.

== Career ==
Ji competed in the men's 50 metre freestyle event at the 2024 Summer Olympics.

He won gold in the 50 m freestyle event at the 2022 Asian Games, setting a national and games record in the process.

He set Asian record in the 50 m freestyle event at the 2025 World Aquatics Championships.
