= Arrest of Ali Hasan =

Ali Hasan Alqudaihi (Arabic: علي حسن القديحي) is an 11-year-old Bahraini boy who was arrested for allegedly participating in an "illegal" protest during his country's national uprising. Alqudaihi was arrested on 14 May 2012 and released without bail during a trial about one month later. On 5 July the court handed down a verdict allowing him to stay home while a social worker monitored him for a year. However, charges were not dropped.

Alqudaihi is one of the youngest detainees in Bahrain since the uprising began in February 2011.

== Biography ==
Alquidaihi has three sisters and a brother. While his family, lawyers and multiple media outlets gave his age as eleven, a government statement said he was twelve.

== Background ==
Beginning in February 2011, Bahrain saw sustained pro-democracy protests, centered at Pearl Roundabout in the capital of Manama, as part of the wider Arab Spring. Authorities responded with a night raid on 17 February (later referred to by protesters as Bloody Thursday), which left four protesters dead and more than 300 injured. Protests continued for a month reaching over 100,000 participants in a nation of about 500,000 citizens, until more than a thousand troops and police from the Gulf Cooperation Council arrived at the request of government and a three-month state of emergency was declared. Authorities then launched a "brutal" crackdown on protesters, including doctors and bloggers. They carried out midnight house raids in Shia neighbourhoods, beatings at checkpoints, and denial of medical care in a "campaign of intimidation". However, smaller-scale protests and clashes have continued to occur almost daily, mostly in areas outside Manama's business districts, with some rare marches in the center of the capital city. More than 80 people had died since the start of the uprising.

In 2011, BCHR said it had documented 188 cases of child arrests which they described as "unlawful and many cases fall under kidnapping or abduction". According to the rights group almost all of them reported mistreatment while in detention and some were transported to hospitals after being detained and had torture marks. The government, however denies such reports. In a statement it said the average number of children held in juvenile detention in the first half of 2012 is about fifteen and that most of them are released within weeks. Opposition activists deny government accusations that they are "exploiting children by encouraging them to protest and clash with police".

== Arrest ==
BCHR said Alqudaihi was arrested on 13 May by plainclothes policemen near his house in Bilad Al Qadeem, a neighbourhood of Manama. However, Noura Al-Khalifa the chief prosecutor for juveniles said the arrest happened on 14 May when Alqudaihi was "blocking a street outside Manama with garbage containers and wood planks".

"It was Saturday, and we were playing. They came and blocked the street, and then left, so we went back out and played a game, and then some civilians came and took pictures of us", Alqudaihi said. He added, on the next day he was "playing in the street" with two of his friends at his age when policemen arrested him. According to him, his friends were able to make it away, but he stopped when a policeman threatened to shoot him with a shotgun. A spokesman of Information Affairs Authority said it was "incorrect" to think he was just playing adding that Alqudaihi was "not only in custody for participating in an illegal gathering, but for his involvement in burning tires and road blocks".

Alqudaihi was first held in Nabih Saleh police station then moved to Isa Town juveniles detention center. Amnesty International said the boy was moved "between several police stations for a period of about four hours and interrogated... that during that time he was alone, he became hungry and tired and eventually confessed to accusations against him". However, the government said he only spent six hours in police custody and spent the rest of the month in a juveniles detention center.

Mohsin Al-Alawi, Alqudaihi's lawyer, said he visited the boy who then denied participating in an "illegal gathering". Shahzalan Khamees, another lawyer defending the boy reported that he was abused during arrest. She also said "[h]e is very sad all the time" and that "All he says is 'I want to go home. I want my mother'. He is frightened and says they are going to punish him. He is only a child". However, a statement by the government said that Alqudaihi "is receiving social care and tutoring at the [detention] centre". While in custody, Alqudaihi was allowed to attend his final school exams.

After his release, Alqudaihi said he was not mistreated in detention and that "treatment was good". He said he spent most of his time doing sport or cleaning the place.

== Trial ==
Alqudaihi's first trial was in a juvenile criminal court on 4 June 2012 and the second on 11 June. He was charged with "joining an illegal gathering" with nearly a dozen of people as well as other protest-related charges. On 11 June, three lawyers defended Alqudaihi in the trial which lasted for ten minutes and resulted in releasing him without bail.

According to chief prosecutor, Alqudaihi pleaded guilty of the charges saying it was on his third attempt to block the street when he was arrested. She further claimed that Alqudaihi said he along with his friends were given three Bahraini Dinars (about $8) by "a man accused of stirring trouble".

Khamees suggested that the accusations made against her client were not true because it is impossible for Alqudaihi to block a road with a garbage container because it is "so heavy that you would need two grown men to lift it". She confirmed Alqudaihi pleaded guilty, but according to her, he then added "a man told me in the investigation that I would be released immediately if I said I dropped trash in the street." Amnesty International stated that the boy "confessed because police promised to release him if he did".

The trial was postponed to 20 June. On 5 July the court handed verdict allowing him to stay home while a social worker monitor him for a year. However, charges were not dropped and his legal status are unclear.

== Reactions ==
A number of rights groups called for Alqudaihi's immediate release. Among them is the Ireland-based Bahrain Rehabilitation and Anti-Violence Organization which issued a statement regarding the "growing number of children detained for investigation in security cases". BCHR expressed its concern for targeting children under fifteen. Human Rights Watch expressed concern that Alqudaihi "was not accompanied by a lawyer during his questioning", adding, "It seems the only evidence used against him is his own confession and the testimony of a police officer". Amnesty International stated, "Arresting an 11-year-old boy, interrogating him for hours without a lawyer before trying him on spurious charges shows a jaw-dropping lack of respect for his rights". The organization criticized the proceedings as "completely out of step with international standards, or even Bahrain's own penal code". The spokeswoman further added that "[t]his case shows the excessive means the Bahraini authorities have resorted to in order to crush protest. I hope they will see sense and drop all the charges against Ali Hassan".

Khamees said "[a]uthorities should be more than satisfied with the time Hasan has spent in jail and the damage they have caused to the boy by imprisoning him" and that the government should "treat children better". She also named the boy a political prisoner.

Khadija Habib, Alqudaihi's mother, said he was innocent and the accusations against him "fabricated".

The Bahraini newspaper Al Wasat wrote that Alqudaihi's case drew "great sympathy" on Facebook and Twitter, and that a number of "former MPs, political society members, human rights activist and citizens" demanded his immediate release. The BBC Arabic reported that his case "received considerable attention by the international media", citing an article in The Independent as an example.
