= Apollo Hess =

Canadian swimmer (born 2002)

Personal information
- Born: July 15, 2002 (age 24) Lethbridge, Alberta, Canada

Sport
- Country: Canada
- Sport: Swimming
- Strokes: Breaststroke

Apollo Hess (born July 15, 2002) is a Canadian competitive swimmer, primarily competing in the breaststroke events.

== Career ==
Hess attended the University of Lethbridge, winning three national university titles. In 2023, Hess transferred to the High Performance Centre in Toronto. At the conclusion of the 2024 Canadian Swim trials, Hess was named to Canada's 2024 Olympics team. At the Paris 2024 Olympics, Hess participated in the heat stage of the Mixed 4 × 100 metre medley relay.

== Personal life ==
Hess is of Indigenous descent and is from the Kainai Nation. The first athlete from his nation to compete at the Olympics, he was awarded a 2025 Tom Longboat Award.
