= Cho Sung-jae =

South Korean swimmer (born 2001)

Personal information
- Nationality: South Korean
- Born: March 13, 2001 (age 25) Ansan, South Korea

Sport
- Sport: Swimming
- Event: Breaststroke
Medal record
Men's swimming
Representing South Korea
Asian Games
Silver medal – second place	2022 Hangzhou	4 × 100 m medley relay
Bronze medal – third place	2026 Aichi–Nagoya	200 m breaststroke
Bronze medal – third place	2026 Aichi–Nagoya	4×100 m medley

Korean name
- Hangul: 조성재
- RR: Jo Seongjae
- MR: Cho Sŏngjae

Cho Sung-jae (Korean: 조성재; born March 13, 2001) is a South Korean swimmer.

== Career ==
In August 2018, he represented South Korea at the 2018 Asian Games held in Indonesia. He competed in the 200m breaststroke event. He finished at rank 6 in the final.

In July 2019, he represented South Korea at the 2019 World Aquatics Championships held in Gwangju, South Korea. He competed in the 200m breaststroke event however he did not advance to compete in the semifinal.

In July 2021, he represented South Korea at the 2020 Summer Olympics held in Tokyo, Japan. He competed in the 100m breaststroke and 200m breaststroke events. In both events, he did not advance to compete in the semifinal.
