= Shoon Mitsunaga =

Japanese swimmer

Personal information
- Native name: 光永 翔音
- Nationality: Japanese
- Born: 28 June 2005 (age 21) Chiba Prefecture, Japan
- Height: 191 cm (6 ft 3 in)

Sport
- Sport: Swimming
Medal record
Men's swimming
Representing Japan
Asian Games
Gold medal – first place	2026 Aichi–Nagoya	100 m butterfly
Silver medal – second place	2026 Aichi–Nagoya	50 m butterfly
Silver medal – second place	2026 Aichi–Nagoya	4×100 m medley
Bronze medal – third place	2026 Aichi–Nagoya	4×100 m freestyle

Shoon Mitsunaga (Japanese: 光永 翔音, born 28 June 2005) is a Japanese swimmer who specializes in the butterfly stroke. He represents Chuo University and competes internationally for Japan.

Mitsunaga won the gold medal in the men's 100 metre butterfly at the 2026 Asian Games in Aichi-Nagoya, setting a Japanese record of 50.56 seconds. He also won silver in the men's 50 metre butterfly and silver in the 4 × 100 metre medley relay, as well as bronze in the 4 × 100 metre freestyle relay.

== Career ==
Mitsunaga was born on 28 June 2005 in Chiba Prefecture. He attended Nihon University Toyoyama High School, where he competed in both swimming and baseball. As a high school swimmer, he won the boys' 100 metre butterfly at the National High School Sports Festival of Japan in 2022. He later entered Chuo University and concentrated on swimming.

In March 2026, Mitsunaga won the men's 50 metre and 100 metre butterfly titles at the Japan Swimming Championships. His victory in the 100 metre butterfly helped earn him selection for Japan's national team for the 2026 Asian Games and the 2026 Pan Pacific Swimming Championships.

At the 2026 Asian Games, Mitsunaga won the men's 100 metre butterfly in 50.56 seconds, breaking the Japanese national record. He defeated fellow Japanese swimmer Katsuhiro Matsumoto and became the Asian Games champion in the event.

The following day, Mitsunaga won the silver medal in the men's 50 metre butterfly in 23.06 seconds, equalling his Japanese record. He subsequently helped Japan win silver in the men's 4 × 100 metre medley relay and bronze in the men's 4 × 100 metre freestyle relay.
