= Shuya Matsumoto =

Japanese swimmer (born 2000)

Personal information
- Native name: 松本 周也
- Nationality: Japanese
- Born: 10 May 2000 (age 26)
- Education: Chukyo University
- Employer: Himawari Network

Sport
- Sport: Swimming
- Strokes: Freestyle
Medal record
Men's swimming
Representing Japan
Asian Games
Silver medal – second place	2026 Aichi–Nagoya	4×100 m medley
Bronze medal – third place	2026 Aichi–Nagoya	4×100 m freestyle
Pan Pacific Swimming Championships
Bronze medal – third place	2026 Irvine	4×100 m freestyle

Shuya Matsumoto (Japanese: 松本 周也, born 10 May 2000) is a Japanese competitive swimmer who specialises in freestyle events. He represents Himawari Network and previously studied at Chukyo University. He won silver in the men's 4 × 100-metre medley relay and bronze in the men's 4 × 100-metre freestyle relay at the 2026 Asian Games. He also won bronze in the men's 4 × 100-metre freestyle relay at the 2026 Pan Pacific Swimming Championships.

== Career ==
Matsumoto studied sports science at Chukyo University, graduating in the 2022 academic year. He subsequently represented Himawari Network in national and international swimming competitions.

In July 2025, Matsumoto recorded 21.64 seconds in the men's 50-metre freestyle at the Shizuoka Junior Swimming Championships. World Aquatics lists the performance as an Asian record and Japanese record. At the same competition, he also won the men's 100-metre freestyle in 48.44 seconds.

At the 2025 Japan National Swimming Championships (25 m), Matsumoto won silver medals in both the men's 50-metre freestyle and 100-metre freestyle events.

At the 101st Japan Swimming Championships in March 2026, Matsumoto won the men's 50-metre freestyle in 21.89 seconds and finished third in the men's 100-metre freestyle. The results contributed to his selection for Japan's team at the 2026 Asian Games and the Pan Pacific Swimming Championships.

At the 2026 Pan Pacific Swimming Championships in Irvine, California, Matsumoto competed in the men's 50-metre freestyle and the men's 4 × 100-metre freestyle relay. Japan won bronze in the relay, recording 3:13.53, with Matsumoto swimming the final leg. He finished sixth in the individual 50-metre freestyle.

Matsumoto represented Japan at the 2026 Asian Games in Aichi–Nagoya. In the men's 50-metre freestyle, he qualified for the final after placing second in the heats, but finished seventh in the final with a time of 22.17 seconds. He won two relay medals at the Games. Matsumoto was part of the Japanese team that earned silver in the men's 4 × 100-metre medley relay and bronze in the men's 4 × 100-metre freestyle relay. The results contributed to Japan's medal tally in swimming at the competition.
