= Aaron Ghebre Owusu =

Eritrean swimmer (born 2006)

Personal information
- National team: Eritrea
- Born: October 13, 2006 (age 19) Silver Spring, Maryland

Sport
- Sport: Swimming

Aaron Ghebre Owusu (born 13 October 2006) is an Eritrean swimmer. He competed in the men's 50 metre freestyle event at the 2024 Summer Olympics, but didn't advance past the heats.
