= Wang Xizhe =

Chinese writer and political critic

writer and a political critic- China

Personal details
- Born: 1948 (age 77–78) Sichuan (China)
- Occupation: Writer, Critic
- Profession: Human right activist Politician

Wang Xizhe (Chinese: 王希哲), born in 1948 in Sichuan, is a Chinese writer and a political critic.

== Biography ==
Wang was born on August 13, 1948, to a middle-class family in Chengdu, Sichuan Province. Raised in Guangdong, Wang became involved with the rebels during the Cultural Revolution and was sent to the countryside in 1968.

In 1974, Wang, together with Li Zhengtian and Chen Yiyang, under the pseudonym "Li Yizhe," posted a big-character poster entitled "Socialist Democracy," in which they questioned the ideological system of the Gang of Four and Lin Biao, and even Mao Zedong's authority, claiming that a "newborn bourgeoisie" had emerged, and calling for the establishment of a socialist system that was more democratic and based on the rule of law.

Together with Liu Xiaobo he wrote and signed a letter that was published on September 30, 1996.

This letter called on the Chinese authorities to reconcile the Chinese Communist Party and Kuomintang, and have dialogue with the Dalai Lama, the exiled head of the Tibetan government.

Liu Xiaobo was later arrested and sentenced to 3 years of "re-education through labor" camp. To escape from arrest, Wang Xizhe took refuge in Hong Kong. His escape was revealed on October 13. Two days later on October 15, he arrived in the United States where he obtained political asylum.
