= Qin Haiyang =

Chinese swimmer (born 1999)

- Qin at the 2023 World Aquatics Championships

Personal information
- Native name: 覃海洋
- Nationality: Chinese
- Born: 17 May 1999 (age 27) Shimen County, Hunan, China
- Height: 1.92 m (6 ft 4 in)

Sport
- Sport: Swimming
- Strokes: Breaststroke; Medley
- Club: Shanghai Swimming Team
- Coach: Cui Dengrong
Medal record
Men's swimming
Representing China
Event	1st	2nd	3rd
Olympic Games	1	1	0
World Championships (LC)	6	2	1
World Championships (SC)	2	1	1
Asian Games	9	1	3
Military World Games	0	3	1
World University Games	5	0	0
Total	23	8	6
Olympic Games
Gold medal – first place	2024 Paris	4×100 m medley
Silver medal – second place	2024 Paris	4×100 m mixed medley
World Championships (LC)
Gold medal – first place	2023 Fukuoka	50 m breaststroke
Gold medal – first place	2023 Fukuoka	100 m breaststroke
Gold medal – first place	2023 Fukuoka	200 m breaststroke
Gold medal – first place	2023 Fukuoka	4×100 m mixed medley
Gold medal – first place	2025 Singapore	100 m breaststroke
Gold medal – first place	2025 Singapore	200 m breaststroke
Silver medal – second place	2023 Fukuoka	4×100 m medley
Silver medal – second place	2025 Singapore	4×100 m mixed medley
Bronze medal – third place	2025 Singapore	50 m breaststroke
World Championships (SC)
Gold medal – first place	2024 Budapest	50 m breaststroke
Gold medal – first place	2024 Budapest	100 m breaststroke
Silver medal – second place	2018 Hangzhou	200 m breaststroke
Bronze medal – third place	2022 Melbourne	200 m breaststroke
Asian Games
Gold medal – first place	2018 Jakarta	4×100 m medley
Gold medal – first place	2022 Hangzhou	50 m breaststroke
Gold medal – first place	2022 Hangzhou	100 m breaststroke
Gold medal – first place	2022 Hangzhou	200 m breaststroke
Gold medal – first place	2022 Hangzhou	4 × 100 m medley relay
Gold medal – first place	2022 Hangzhou	4×100 m mixed medley
Gold medal – first place	2026 Aichi–Nagoya	50 m breaststroke
Gold medal – first place	2026 Aichi–Nagoya	4×100 m medley
Gold medal – first place	2026 Aichi-Nagoya	4×100 m mixed medley
Silver medal – second place	2022 Hangzhou	200 m medley
Bronze medal – third place	2018 Jakarta	200 m breaststroke
Bronze medal – third place	2018 Jakarta	200 m medley
Bronze medal – third place	2026 Aichi–Nagoya	100 m breaststroke
Military World Games
Silver medal – second place	2019 Wuhan	200 m breaststroke
Silver medal – second place	2019 Wuhan	200 m medley
Silver medal – second place	2019 Wuhan	400 m medley
Bronze medal – third place	2019 Wuhan	100 m breaststroke
World University Games
Gold medal – first place	2021 Chengdu	50 m breaststroke
Gold medal – first place	2021 Chengdu	100 m breaststroke
Gold medal – first place	2021 Chengdu	200 m breaststroke
Gold medal – first place	2021 Chengdu	4×100 m medley
Gold medal – first place	2021 Chengdu	4×100 m mixed medley
Asian Championships
Gold medal – first place	2025 Ahmedabad	4×200 m freestyle
Gold medal – first place	2025 Ahmedabad	50 m breaststroke
Gold medal – first place	2025 Ahmedabad	100 m breaststroke
Gold medal – first place	2025 Ahmedabad	200 m breaststroke
Gold medal – first place	2025 Ahmedabad	4×100 m medley
Gold medal – first place	2025 Ahmedabad	4×100 m mixed medley

Qin Haiyang (Chinese: 覃海洋, born 17 May 1999) is a Chinese swimmer who specializes in the breaststroke and individual medley. He previously held the world record in the 200m breaststroke, which he set at the 2023 World Aquatics Championships. At the same competition, Qin became the first swimmer in history to win all three breaststroke events at a single edition of the championships. Qin was also the former world junior record holder in the 200m breaststroke and 200m individual medley. In 2023, Qin became the first Asian swimmer to be named as the Male Swimmer of the Year by World Aquatics.

== Career ==
At his first major international competition, the 2018 Asian Games, he participated in the 4x100 metre medley relay and won gold.

Later in December, he competed in the 2018 World Championships, where he won the silver medal in the 200 metre Breaststroke.

Then, in 2019, he won three silver medals and one bronze at the Military World Games.

He qualified for the 2021 Tokyo Olympics in the 200m breaststroke and finished first in his 200m breaststroke heat, but was disqualified for making an illegal kick after a turn, in what he called a "stupid mistake".

Since 2022, Qin started to train under Cui Dengrong, who also coached 2020 Olympic Games champion Zhang Yufei. Under Cui's coaching, Qin saw large improvements.

At the 2023 World Aquatics Championships, Qin became the first man in history to win gold in all three breaststroke events at a single edition of the championship. With a time of 2:05.48, he broke the world record in 200m breaststroke, which was previously established by 2020 Olympic Games champion Zac Stubblety-Cook in 2022. Qin also set new Asian records in 50m and 100m breaststroke respectively.

In the 2022 Hangzhou Asian Games (held in 2023 due to the COVID-19 pandemic), Qin again won all three individual breaststroke events. He also won the silver medal in the 200m individual medley. In the men's 4 × 100 m medley relay, the Chinese team of Xu Jiayu, Qin Haiyang, Wang Changhao, and Pan Zhanle broke the Asian record by finishing in 3:27.01. This was also the second-fastest in history, just 0.23 behind Team USA's world record time in the 2020 Olympic Games. The Chinese team of Xu Jiayu, Qin Haiyang, Zhang Yufei, and Yang Junxuan also set the new Asian record in the mixed 4 × 100 m medley relay. With his teammate Zhang Yufei, Qin Haiyang was named the MVP of 2022 Asian Games for his five gold medals.

Afterwards, at the 2023 Swimming World Cup, Qin won gold in all three breaststroke events (50m, 100m, and 200m) at all three World Cup legs, held in Berlin, Athens and Budapest. Qin was consequently named as the winner of the World Cup title due to his performances at all three legs.

While at the 2024 Paris Olympics, Qin Haiyang lamented that;

"The (drug) tests come early in the morning before we’re even awake, during midday rest periods, forcing us to rest on hotel lobby sofas, and even late at night, keeping us up past midnight"

And after a poor start to Qin's marquee individual breaststroke events where he failed to medal, Qin would later bounce-back to swim the fastest split-times in the finals of his breastroke legs in the team events; 57.82 and 57.98 in the Mixed 4 × 100 m Medley Relay and the Men's 4 × 100 m Medley Relay to secure Silver and Gold medals respectively, and handing the United States swim team its first defeat in the latter-event since it was first-introduced into the Olympic program in the 1960 Rome Olympics.

At the 2025 World Aquatics Championships in Singapore, Qin Haiyang won the gold medal in the 200 m breaststroke, coming from lane eight with a time of 2:07.41. The victory marked his second gold of the championships, following his win in the 100 metre breaststroke and a bronze in the 50 metre breaststroke. His performance in the final was notable as he was the only swimmer to qualify with a time slower than 2:09.00.

== Personal bests ==
As of 28 Jul 2023

=== Long course (50 m) ===
Event	Time	Meet	Date	Note(s)
50 m breaststroke	26.20	2023 World Championships	25 July 2023	AS, NR
100 m breaststroke	57.69	2023 World Championships	24 July 2023	AS, NR
200 m breaststroke	2:05.48	2023 World Championships	28 July 2023	WR, AS, NR
200 m individual medley	1:56.79	2019 Military World Games	20 October 2019	
400 m individual medley	4:10.41	2019 Military World Games	21 October 2019	

=== Short course (25 m) ===
Event	Time	Meet	Date	Note(s)
50 m breaststroke	25.38	2024 Swimming World Cup	19 October 2024	AS, NR
100 m breaststroke	55.47	2024 World Short Course Championships	12 December 2024	AS, NR
200 m breaststroke	2.01.15	2018 World Short Course Championships	13 December 2018	NR, Former AS
100 m individual medley	57.18	2017 Swimming World Cup	11 November 2017	
200 m individual medley	1.54.51	2022 Chinese National Championships (25m)	28 October 2022	

Key: NR = National Record; AS = Asian Record; WR = World Record

== Records ==
=== Long course (50 m) ===
No.	Event	Time		Meet	Location	Date	Age	Type	Status	Ref
1	200 m individual medley	1:57.54		2017 Chinese National Championships	Qingdao, China	14 April 2017	17	WJ (not ratified)	Former	
2	200 m breaststroke	2:08.71		2017 Chinese National Championships	Qingdao, China	15 April 2017	17	WJ (not ratified), NR	Former	
3	200 m individual medley	1:59.01	h	2017 World Aquatics Championships	Budapest, Hungary	26 July 2017	18	WJ	Former	
4	200 m individual medley	1:57.981	sf	2017 World Aquatics Championships	Budapest, Hungary	26 July 2017	18	WJ	Former	
5	200 m breaststroke	2:09.39	h	2017 World Aquatics Championships	Budapest, Hungary	27 July 2017	18	WJ	Former	
6	200 m individual medley	1:57.06		2017 World Aquatics Championships	Budapest, Hungary	27 July 2017	18	WJ	Former	
7	200 m breaststroke	2:07.35		2017 National Games of China	Tianjin, China	4 September 2017	18	WJ (not ratified), NR	Former	
8	50 m breaststroke	26.63		2023 Chinese Spring Championships	Qingdao, China	24 March 2023	23	AS	Former	
9	100 m breaststroke	57.93		2023 Chinese Championships	Hangzhou, China	2 May 2023	23	AS	Former	
10	100 m breaststroke	57.69		2023 World Championships	Fukuoka, Japan	24 July 2023	24	AS	Current	
11	50 m breaststroke	26.34	h	2023 World Championships	Fukuoka, Japan	25 July 2023	24	AS	Former	
12	50 m breaststroke	26.20	sf	2023 World Championships	Fukuoka, Japan	25 July 2023	24	AS	Current	
13	200 m breaststroke	2:05.48		2023 World Championships	Fukuoka, Japan	28 July 2023	24	WR	Former	
14	100 m breaststroke	57.69		2023 World Aquatics Swimming World Cup	Berlin, Germany	6 October 2023	24	=AS	Current	

=== Short course (25 m) ===
No.	Event	Time		Meet	Location	Date	Age	Type	Status	Ref
1	200 m breaststroke	2:04.18		2017 Swimming World Cup	Beijing, China	10 November 2017	18	NR	Former	
2	200 m breaststroke	2:01.64	h	2018 World Short Course Championships	Hangzhou, China	13 December 2018	19	NR	Former	
3	200 m breaststroke	2:01.15		2018 World Short Course Championships	Hangzhou, China	13 December 2018	19	AS	Former	
4	100 m breaststroke	56.31		2022 Chinese National Championships (25m)	Beijing, China	27 October 2022	23	NR	Current	

Key: NR = National Record; AS = Asian Record; WJ = World Junior Record; WR = World Record; h = heats; sf = semifinal

Records
Preceded by (Australia) Zac Stubblety-Cook	Men's 200-metre breaststroke world record-holder (long course); 28 July 2023 – present	Succeeded by Incumbent
