= Chan Chun Ho =

Singaporean swimmer (born 2002)

Personal information
- Born: 1 February 2004 (age 22) Singapore

Sport
- Sport: Swimming
- Strokes: Breaststroke
Medal record
Men's swimming
| Event | 1st | 2nd | 3rd |
|---|---|---|---|
| Southeast Asian Games | 2 | 2 | 0 |
| Total | 2 | 2 | 0 |
Southeast Asian Games
| Gold medal – first place | 2025 Thailand | 50 m breaststroke |
| Gold medal – first place | 2025 Thailand | 4×100 m medley |
| Silver medal – second place | 2025 Thailand | 100 m breaststroke |
| Silver medal – second place | 2025 Thailand | 200 m breaststroke |

Chan Chun Ho (born 1 February 2004) is a Singaporean swimmer who specialises in breaststroke events. He is also the national record holder in the men's 50m breaststroke event.

== Career ==
On 18 October 2025, Chan set the national record for the fastest 50m freestyle in the short course (25m) at the 2025 World Aquatics Swimming World Cup held in Westmont, United States.

At the 2025 SEA Games, Chan obtained 2 golds at the 50m breaststroke and the 4 × 100 m medley relay. He broke the national record for the 50m breaststroke with a timing of 27.68. He obtained 2 silvers at the 100m and 200m breaststroke events as well.
