= Ju-jitsu at the 2026 Asian Games =

- Venue: Aichi Budokan
- Dates: 1–3 October 2026
- Competitors: 203 from 26 nations

Ju-jitsu at the 2026 Asian Games was held between 1 and 3 October 2026 at the Aichi Budokan.

== Schedule ==
The schedule is as follows:

Q	Quarterfinals and repechage	F	Semifinals and final

Event↓/Date →	1st Thu		2nd Fri		3rd Sat	
Men's events
Men's 62 kg	Q	F				
Men's 69 kg	Q	F				
Men's 77 kg			Q	F		
Men's 85 kg					Q	F
Men's 94 kg			Q	F		
Women's events
Women's 48 kg	Q	F				
Women's 52 kg			Q	F		
Women's 63 kg					Q	F

== Medal summary ==
=== Medal table ===
* Host nation (Japan)

Rank	Nation	Gold	Silver	Bronze	Total
1	United Arab Emirates	5	2	1	8
2	Saudi Arabia	2	0	3	5
3	Thailand	1	0	2	3
4	South Korea	0	2	4	6
5	Kazakhstan	0	2	3	5
6	Philippines	0	1	1	2
7	Jordan	0	1	0	1
8	Kyrgyzstan	0	0	1	1
8	Mongolia	0	0	1	1
Totals (9 entries)		8	8	16	32

=== Medalists ===
==== Men's events ====
Event	Gold	Silver	Bronze
62 kg	Khaled Al-Shehhi; United Arab Emirates	Omar Al-Suwaidi; United Arab Emirates	Khaleb Habab; Saudi Arabia
62 kg	Khaled Al-Shehhi; United Arab Emirates	Omar Al-Suwaidi; United Arab Emirates	Abdulmalik Al-Murdhi; Saudi Arabia
69 kg	Ahmed Andeez; United Arab Emirates	Nurzhan Batyrbekov; Kazakhstan	Joo Seong-hyeon; South Korea
69 kg	Ahmed Andeez; United Arab Emirates	Nurzhan Batyrbekov; Kazakhstan	Mohammed Bin Huraymil; Saudi Arabia
77 kg	Mahdi Al-Awlaqi; United Arab Emirates	Mahmoud Jabr; Jordan	Park Jae-woon; South Korea
77 kg	Mahdi Al-Awlaqi; United Arab Emirates	Mahmoud Jabr; Jordan	Seiilkhan Bolatbek; Kazakhstan
85 kg	Abdullah Tariq Nada; Saudi Arabia	Merey Kabdullayev; Kazakhstan	Kim Min-gyu; South Korea
85 kg	Abdullah Tariq Nada; Saudi Arabia	Merey Kabdullayev; Kazakhstan	Abdurahman Murtazaliev; Kyrgyzstan
94 kg	Omar Nada; Saudi Arabia	Park Sung-hu; South Korea	Amaar Al-Hosani; United Arab Emirates
94 kg	Omar Nada; Saudi Arabia	Park Sung-hu; South Korea	Kim Hee-dong; South Korea

==== Women's events ====
Event	Gold	Silver	Bronze
48 kg	Balqees Abdulla; United Arab Emirates	Alaonod Al-Harbi; United Arab Emirates	Miyu Suzuki; Thailand
48 kg	Balqees Abdulla; United Arab Emirates	Alaonod Al-Harbi; United Arab Emirates	Zhibek Kulumbetova; Kazakhstan
52 kg	Asma Al-Hosani; United Arab Emirates	Im Eon-ju; South Korea	Nuchanat Singchalad; Thailand
52 kg	Asma Al-Hosani; United Arab Emirates	Im Eon-ju; South Korea	Kaila Napolis; Philippines
63 kg	Orapa Senatham; Thailand	Alex Enriquez; Philippines	Narankhishig Baasanjargal; Mongolia
63 kg	Orapa Senatham; Thailand	Alex Enriquez; Philippines	Marian Zhuravleva; Kazakhstan

== Participating nations ==
- Afghanistan (4)
- Bahrain (2)
- Cambodia (5)
- Chinese Taipei (2)
- Iran (3)
- Iraq (1)
- Japan (9) (host)
- Jordan (9)
- Kazakhstan (15)
- Kuwait (6)
- Kyrgyzstan (12)
- Laos (3)
- Malaysia (1)
- Mongolia (16)
- Palestine (4)
- Philippines (15)
- Qatar (4)
- Saudi Arabia (9)
- Singapore (9)
- South Korea (16)
- Syria (2)
- Tajikistan (8)
- Thailand (15)
- United Arab Emirates (16)
- Uzbekistan (4)
- Vietnam (13)
