= Karate at the 2026 Asian Games =

- Venue: Toyohashi City General Gymnasium
- Dates: 20–23 September 2026
- Competitors: 176 from 33 nations

Karate at the 2026 Asian Games was held between 20 and 23 September 2026 at the Toyohashi City General Gymnasium, Toyohashi, Aichi, Japan.

== Schedule ==
| P | Preliminary rounds & Repechage | F | Finals |

| Event↓/Date → | 20th Sun | | 21st Mon | | 22nd Tue | | 23rd Wed | |
|---|---|---|---|---|---|---|---|---|
| Men's kata | | | P | F | | | | |
| Men's team kata | | | | | | | P | F |
| Men's kumite 55 kg | P | F | | | | | | |
| Men's kumite 60 kg | P | F | | | | | | |
| Men's kumite 67 kg | | | P | F | | | | |
| Men's kumite 75 kg | | | | | P | F | | |
| Men's kumite 84 kg | | | | | P | F | | |
| Men's kumite +84 kg | | | | | | | P | F |
| Women's kata | P | F | | | | | | |
| Women's team kata | | | | | P | F | | |
| Women's kumite 50 kg | | | | | | | P | F |
| Women's kumite 55 kg | | | | | P | F | | |
| Women's kumite 61 kg | | | P | F | | | | |
| Women's kumite 68 kg | | | P | F | | | | |
| Women's kumite +68 kg | P | F | | | | | | |

== Medalists ==
=== Men ===
| Event | Gold | Silver | Bronze |
|---|---|---|---|
| Kata | Kakeru Nishiyama; Japan | Fong Man Hou; Macau | Howard Hung; Hong Kong |
| Kata | Kakeru Nishiyama; Japan | Fong Man Hou; Macau | Mohammad Al-Mosawi; Kuwait |
| Team kata | Kuwait; Mohammad Al-Mosawi; Salman Al-Mosawi; Mohammad Bader | Macau; Cheang Pei Lok; Fong Man Hou; Kuok Kin Hang | Hong Kong; Howard Hung; Li Chi Kong; Tang Yu Hin |
| Team kata | Kuwait; Mohammad Al-Mosawi; Salman Al-Mosawi; Mohammad Bader | Macau; Cheang Pei Lok; Fong Man Hou; Kuok Kin Hang | Malaysia; Aiqal Asmadie; Haznil Henry; Mukhriz Mazlan |
| Kumite −55 kg | Zholaman Bigabyl; Kazakhstan | Khumoyunmirzo Khalimov; Uzbekistan | Thevendran Kaliana Sundram; Malaysia |
| Kumite −55 kg | Zholaman Bigabyl; Kazakhstan | Khumoyunmirzo Khalimov; Uzbekistan | Makhsatullo Muminov; Tajikistan |
| Kumite −60 kg | Abdullah Shaaban; Kuwait | Abdelrahman Abdelhamid; Qatar | Saud Al-Basher; Saudi Arabia |
| Kumite −60 kg | Abdullah Shaaban; Kuwait | Abdelrahman Abdelhamid; Qatar | Sureeya Sankar; Malaysia |
| Kumite −67 kg | Abdul Vakhkhob Rashidov; Uzbekistan | Yugo Kozaki; Japan | Shih Cheng-chung; Chinese Taipei |
| Kumite −67 kg | Abdul Vakhkhob Rashidov; Uzbekistan | Yugo Kozaki; Japan | Abdelrahman Al-Masatfa; Jordan |
| Kumite −75 kg | Morteza Nemati; Iran | Dawut Nazmyradow; Turkmenistan | Nurkanat Azhikanov; Kazakhstan |
| Kumite −75 kg | Morteza Nemati; Iran | Dawut Nazmyradow; Turkmenistan | Fawaz Bani Al-Marjeh; Syria |
| Kumite −84 kg | Mohammad Al-Jafari; Jordan | Ali Asghar Asiabari; Iran | Chung Meng-yu; Chinese Taipei |
| Kumite −84 kg | Mohammad Al-Jafari; Jordan | Ali Asghar Asiabari; Iran | Abdulla Babikr; Qatar |
| Kumite +84 kg | Mahmoud Nemati; Iran | Sanad Sufyani; Saudi Arabia | Teerawat Kangtong; Thailand |
| Kumite +84 kg | Mahmoud Nemati; Iran | Sanad Sufyani; Saudi Arabia | Tenzing Sherpa; Nepal |

=== Women ===
| Event | Gold | Silver | Bronze |
|---|---|---|---|
| Kata | Maho Ono; Japan | Grace Lau; Hong Kong | Bùi Ngọc Nhi; Vietnam |
| Kata | Maho Ono; Japan | Grace Lau; Hong Kong | Chien Hui-hsuan; Chinese Taipei |
| Team kata | Vietnam; Bùi Ngọc Nhi; Hoàng Thị Thu Uyên; Nguyễn Ngọc Trâm | Iran; Sepideh Amini; Zeinab Hosseini; Fatemeh Sadeghi | Philippines; Ysabielle Arrogante; Rebecca Torres; Samantha Veguillas |
| Team kata | Vietnam; Bùi Ngọc Nhi; Hoàng Thị Thu Uyên; Nguyễn Ngọc Trâm | Iran; Sepideh Amini; Zeinab Hosseini; Fatemeh Sadeghi | Chinese Taipei; Chien Hui-hsuan; Hung Chih-hsuan; Tien Hsin-erh |
| Kumite −50 kg | Shahmalarani Chandran; Malaysia | Tsang Yee Ting; Hong Kong | Fong Man Wai; Macau |
| Kumite −50 kg | Shahmalarani Chandran; Malaysia | Tsang Yee Ting; Hong Kong | Marie June Adriano; Philippines |
| Kumite −55 kg | Adeola Fay Robert; Malaysia | Fatemeh Zahra Saeidabadi; Iran | Cok Istri Agung Sanistyarani; Indonesia |
| Kumite −55 kg | Adeola Fay Robert; Malaysia | Fatemeh Zahra Saeidabadi; Iran | Bella Samasheva; Kazakhstan |
| Kumite −61 kg | Gong Li; China | Assel Kanay; Kazakhstan | Sarara Shimada; Japan |
| Kumite −61 kg | Gong Li; China | Assel Kanay; Kazakhstan | Vann Chakriya; Cambodia |
| Kumite −68 kg | Li Qiaoqiao; China | Joud Al-Drous; Jordan | Nguyễn Thị Diệu Ly; Vietnam |
| Kumite −68 kg | Li Qiaoqiao; China | Joud Al-Drous; Jordan | Wong Cheuk Lee; Hong Kong |
| Kumite +68 kg | Sofya Berultseva; Kazakhstan | Maneewan Butsuwan; Thailand | Leica Al Humaira Lubis; Indonesia |
| Kumite +68 kg | Sofya Berultseva; Kazakhstan | Maneewan Butsuwan; Thailand | Dina Mustafa; Saudi Arabia |

== Medal table ==
| Rank | Nation | Gold | Silver | Bronze | Total |
|---|---|---|---|---|---|
| 1 | Iran (IRI) | 2 | 3 | 0 | 5 |
| 2 | Kazakhstan (KAZ) | 2 | 1 | 2 | 5 |
| 3 | Japan (JPN) | 2 | 1 | 1 | 4 |
| 4 | Malaysia (MAS) | 2 | 0 | 3 | 5 |
| 5 | Kuwait (KUW) | 2 | 0 | 1 | 3 |
| 6 | China (CHN) | 2 | 0 | 0 | 2 |
| 7 | Jordan (JOR) | 1 | 1 | 1 | 3 |
| 8 | Uzbekistan (UZB) | 1 | 1 | 0 | 2 |
| 9 | Vietnam (VIE) | 1 | 0 | 2 | 3 |
| 10 | Hong Kong (HKG) | 0 | 2 | 3 | 5 |
| 11 | Macau (MAC) | 0 | 2 | 1 | 3 |
| 12 | Saudi Arabia (KSA) | 0 | 1 | 2 | 3 |
| 13 | Qatar (QAT) | 0 | 1 | 1 | 2 |
| 13 | Thailand (THA) | 0 | 1 | 1 | 2 |
| 15 | Turkmenistan (TKM) | 0 | 1 | 0 | 1 |
| 16 | Chinese Taipei (TPE) | 0 | 0 | 4 | 4 |
| 17 | Indonesia (INA) | 0 | 0 | 2 | 2 |
| 17 | Philippines (PHI) | 0 | 0 | 2 | 2 |
| 19 | Cambodia (CAM) | 0 | 0 | 1 | 1 |
| 19 | Nepal (NEP) | 0 | 0 | 1 | 1 |
| 19 | Syria (SYR) | 0 | 0 | 1 | 1 |
| 19 | Tajikistan (TJK) | 0 | 0 | 1 | 1 |
| Totals (22 entries) | | 15 | 15 | 30 | 60 |

== Participating nations ==
A total of 176 athletes from 33 nations competed in karate at the 2026 Asian Games:

- Bangladesh (4)
- Brunei (1)
- Cambodia (10)
- China (2)
- Chinese Taipei (10)
- Hong Kong (8)
- India (2)
- Indonesia (6)
- Iran (8)
- Japan (6)
- Jordan (6)
- Kazakhstan (6)
- Kuwait (8)
- Kyrgyzstan (4)
- Laos (4)
- Macau (10)
- Malaysia (8)
- Mongolia (6)
- Nepal (8)
- North Korea (1)
- Palestine (2)
- Philippines (6)
- Qatar (3)
- Saudi Arabia (6)
- Singapore (3)
- South Korea (6)
- Sri Lanka (1)
- Syria (2)
- Tajikistan (3)
- Thailand (8)
- Turkmenistan (3)
- Uzbekistan (6)
- Vietnam (9)
