= Palestine at the 2026 Asian Games =

- IOC code: PLE
- NOC: Palestine Olympic Committee

in Aichi–Nagoya, Japan September 19 – October 4, 2026
- Competitors: 70 in 18 sports
- Medals: Gold 0 Silver 0 Bronze 0 Total 0

Asian Games appearances (overview)
- 1990; 1994; 1998; 2002; 2006; 2010; 2014; 2018; 2022; 2026

Palestine is competed at the 2026 Asian Games in Aichi Prefecture and Nagoya, Japan from September 19 to October 4, 2026.

== Competitors ==
The following is a list of the number of competitors representing Palestine who participated at the Asian Games:

Sport	Men	Women	Total
Archery	0	1	1
Athletics	4	0	4
Baseball	24	0	24
Boxing	2	1	3
Equestrian	1	1	2
Esports	5	0	5
Golf	3	1	4
Ju-jitsu	2	2	4
Judo	1	0	1
Karate	2	0	2
Modern pentathlon	2	0	2
Rowing	2	0	2
Shooting	3	0	3
Swimming	2	5	7
Taekwondo	1	0	1
Triathlon	1	0	1
Weightlifting	1	0	1
Wrestling	2	1	3
Total	58	12	70

== Archery ==
Recurve

Athlete	Event	Ranking round		Round of 48	Round of 32	Round of 16	Quarterfinals	Semifinals	Final / BM	
Athlete	Event	Score	Seed	Opposition Score	Opposition Score	Opposition Score	Opposition Score	Opposition Score	Opposition Score	Rank
Rasha Abumyghiseeb	Women's individual	542	49	Shimu (BAN); L 0–6	Did not advance					

== Athletics ==
Key

- Note–Ranks given for track events are within the athlete's heat only
- Q = Qualified for the next round
- q = Qualified for the next round as a fastest loser or, in field events, by position without achieving the qualifying target
- NR = National record
- N/A = Round not applicable for the event
- Bye = Athlete not required to compete in round

Track events
Men

Athlete	Event	Heat		Semifinal		Final	
Athlete	Event	Result	Rank	Result	Rank	Result	Rank
Basel Selmi	400 m	49.68	9	—N/a		Did not advance	
Yahya Mashaqi	800 m	DNS	—N/a	—N/a		Did not advance	
Yahya Mashaqi	1500 m	4:08.59	11	—N/a		Did not advance	
Ahmed Wridat	5000 m	—N/a				15:55.28	18
Ahmed Wridat	10,000 m	—N/a				DNF	—N/a

== Baseball ==
Summary

Team	Event	Group stage				Placement round		Super round	Final / BM	
Team	Event	Opposition Result	Opposition Result	Opposition Result	Rank	Opposition Result	Opposition Result	Opposition Result	Opposition Result	Rank
Palestine men's	Men's tournament	Philippines; L 0–12	Japan; L 0–15	China; L 1–9	4	Hong Kong; W 7–2	Thailand; L 0–1	Did not advance		8

Team roster

Player	No.	Pos.	Date of birth
Syam Lafi	22		August 22, 1996
Kyle Bader	16		July 24, 2006
Nicolas Barksdale	28		August 15, 2003
Tarik Elabour	42		June 20, 1992
Hasan Ammar	33		December 5, 2004
Yacoub Rayan	21		October 19, 2006
Abdelraheem Doleh	55		June 14, 2000
Luke Shahinkubty	12		June 19, 2003
Joseph Yabbour	39		July 9, 2003
Yousef Abbasi	4		December 23, 2004
Tariq Suboh	6		May 27, 1992
Patrick Khoury			September 29, 2002
Ahmad Ghouleh	11		July 11, 2003
Yunis Haleem	30		August 8, 1997
Charles Haddad	7		July 11, 2002
David Powres	19		May 25, 1989
Rumsey Yasin	26		December 26, 2002
Fares Thabata	5		August 12, 2007
Omar Shublaq	77		September 16, 2000
Dylan Ahmad	1		October 6, 2000
Steven Mufareh	9		August 27, 2004
Adnan Jaber	27		May 27, 1988
Paul Baba	36		October 15, 2003
Ahmad Harjli	34		May 31, 2001

== Boxing ==
Athlete	Event	Round of 32	Round of 16	Quarterfinals	Semifinals	Final	
Athlete	Event	Opposition Result	Opposition Result	Opposition Result	Opposition Result	Opposition Result	Rank
Mohammed Issa	Men's 70 kg	Kan Ch-w (TPE); W 4–1	Eshash (JOR); L 2–3	Did not advance			

== Equestrian ==
=== Dressage ===
Athlete	Horse	Event	Grand Prix		Grand Prix Freestyle		Overall	
Athlete	Horse	Event	Score	Rank	Technical	Artistic	Score	Rank
Aleksandra Maksakova		Individual						

Qualification Legend: Q = Qualified for the final; q = Qualified for the final as a lucky loser

=== Jumping ===
Athlete	Horse	Event	Qualification			Final		
Athlete	Horse	Event	Penalties	Time	Rank	Penalties	Time	Rank
Egor Shchibrik		Individual jumping B						

Qualification Legend: Q = Qualified for the final; q = Qualified for the final as a lucky loser

== Esports ==
eFootball

Gamer	Event	Group stage		Rank	Quarterfinals	Semifinals	Final	Rank
Gamer	Event	Opposition Score	Opposition Score	Rank	Opposition Score	Opposition Score	Opposition Score	Rank
Hassan Aljuneidi; Osayd Shakhdam	eFootball	Limprapat; Rungratkasikul (THA); L 0–2	Chatani; Kida (JPN); L 0–2	3	Did not advance			

Competitive Martial Arts

Team	Event	Group stage			Quarterfinals	Semifinals	Final	
Team	Event	Opposition Score	Opposition Score	Rank	Opposition Score	Opposition Score	Opposition Score	Rank
Adham Ketaneh; Amir Khammash; George Dabbah	Competitive Martial Arts	United Arab Emirates (UAE); L 0–3	Japan (JPN); L 0–3	3	Did not advance			

== Golf ==
Individual

Golfer	Event	Round 1	Round 2	Round 3	Round 4	Total		
Golfer	Event	Score	Score	Score	Score	Score	To Par	Rank
Amro Alhouseini	Men stroke play	85	89	Cut		174	+34	T62
Joseph Easmeil	Men stroke play	84	76	Cut		160	+20	T53
Heneri Ismail	Men stroke play	95	79	Cut		174	+34	T62
Yasmin Thaher	Women stroke play	81	84	Cut		165	+25	39

Team

Golfer	Event	Round 1	Round 2	Round 3	Round 4	Total		
Golfer	Event	Score	Score	Score	Score	Score	To Par	Rank
Amro Alhouseini; Joseph Easmeil; Heneri Ismail	Men	169	155	Cut		324	+44	19

== Ju-jitsu ==
Athlete	Event	Round of 64	Round of 32	Round of 16	Quarterfinals	Semifinals	Repechage	Final / BM	
Athlete	Event	Opposition Result	Opposition Result	Opposition Result	Opposition Result	Opposition Result	Opposition Result	Opposition Result	Rank
Mohammed Ajaj	Men's –62 kg	—N/a	–	–	–	–	–	–	
Izzeddin Owdetallah	Men's –69 kg	—N/a	–	–	–	–	–	–	–
Lina Eraikat	Women's –52 kg	—N/a	–	–	–	–	–	–	
Dania Obaid	Women's –63 kg	—N/a	–	–	–	–	–	–	

== Judo ==
Athlete	Event	Round of 32	Round of 16	Quarterfinals	Semifinals	Repechage	Final / BM	
Athlete	Event	Opposition Result	Opposition Result	Opposition Result	Opposition Result	Opposition Result	Opposition Result	Rank
Muayad Thwaib	Men's –81 kg	–	–	–	–	–	–	

== Karate ==
Key:

• H - Hantei (Decision)

Men

Athlete	Event	Round of 32	Round of 16	Quarterfinals	Semifinals	Repechage	Final / BM	
Athlete	Event	Opposition Result	Opposition Result	Opposition Result	Opposition Result	Opposition Result	Opposition Result	Rank
Mahmoud Daifallah	Men's kumite –67 kg	Bye	Akylbek Uluu (KGZ) (H) W 0–0	Rashidov (UZB); L 1–5	Did not advance	Cheng H.P (HKG); W 5–3	Almastafa (JOR); L 0–4	5
Abdallah Alkhatib	Men's kumite –84 kg	—N/a		Bye	Asiabari (IRI); L DSQ	—N/a	Babikr (QAT); L 0–8	5

== Modern pentathlon ==
Athlete	Event		Fencing (épée one touch)			Fencing (Direct Elimination)		Obstacle run			Swimming (100 m freestyle)			Combined: shooting/running (10 m laser pistol)/(3000 m)			Total points	Final rank
Athlete	Event		V	D	Rank	Rank	MP Points	Time	Rank	MP points	Time	Rank	MP points	Time	Rank	MP points	Total points	Final rank
Abdallah Abushabab	Men's individual	Semifinal	11	24	30	17	198	26.99	8	364	1:04.99	14	293	11:59.33	13	581	1436	13
Abdallah Abushabab	Men's individual	Final	11	24	30	Did not advance												
Omar Abushabab	Men's individual	Semifinal	11	24	30	13	210	38.69	15	329	59.48	12	303	12:05.77	12	575	1417	12
Omar Abushabab	Men's individual	Final	11	24	30	Did not advance												

== Rowing ==
Athlete	Event	Heats		Final	
Athlete	Event	Time	Rank	Time	Rank
Amel Younis; Rayyan Ghalayini	Men's double sculls	6:46.37	9 FB	6:46.37	4 FB4

Qualification Legend: FA=Final A (medal); FB=Final B (non-medal)

== Shooting ==
Athlete	Event	Qualification		Final	
Athlete	Event	Points	Rank	Points	Rank
Johny Abujeries	Men's skeet	88	43	Did not advance	
Jorge Antonio Salhe	Men's skeet	112	27	Did not advance	
Marcelo Yarad	Men's skeet	111	31	Did not advance	
Johny Abujeries; Jorge Antonio Salhe; Marcelo Yarad	Men's skeet team	—N/a		311	10

== Swimming ==
Men

Athlete	Event	Heat		Final	
Athlete	Event	Time	Rank	Time	Rank
Jonathan Shaheen	50 m freestyle	24.34	35	Did not advance	
Jonathan Shaheen	100 m freestyle	53.31	31	Did not advance	
Jonathan Shaheen	50 m butterfly	25.76	29	Did not advance	
Jonathan Shaheen	100 m butterfly	56.08	25	Did not advance	
Mahmoud Abugharbia	50 m freestyle	24.94	40	Did not advance	
Mahmoud Abugharbia	100 m freestyle	54.48	39	Did not advance	
Mahmoud Abugharbia	50 m butterfly	26.80	37	Did not advance	

Women

Athlete	Event	Heat		Final	
Athlete	Event	Time	Rank	Time	Rank
Marina Abu Shamaleh	50 m freestyle	28.79	26	Did not advance	
Marina Abu Shamaleh	50 m butterfly	30.18	22	Did not advance	
Marina Abu Shamaleh	100 m breaststroke	1:15.61	17	Did not advance	
Maya Khalil	50 m freestyle	28.34	24	Did not advance	
Maya Khalil	100 m freestyle	1:01.97	27	Did not advance	
Maya Khalil	50 m butterfly	30.18	22	Did not advance	
Maya Khalil	100 m butterfly	1:13.13	19	Did not advance	
Farah Fares	200 m freestyle	2:13.69	18	Did not advance	
Farah Fares	50 m backstroke	31.52	25	Did not advance	
Farah Fares	100 m backstroke	1:08.52	23	Did not advance	
Farah Fares	200 m backstroke	2:29.05	19	Did not advance	
Valerie Tarazi	50 m backstroke	30.63	22	Did not advance	
Valerie Tarazi	100 m backstroke	1:05.31	17	Did not advance	
Valerie Tarazi	200 m backstroke	2:24.62	18	Did not advance	
Valerie Tarazi	50 m breaststroke	33.09	14	Did not advance	
Valerie Tarazi	200 m breaststroke	2:39.09	14	Did not advance	
Valerie Tarazi	200 m individual medley	2:24.19	16	Did not advance	
Alma Shaat	100 m breaststroke	1:17.37	18	Did not advance	
Alma Shaat	200 m breaststroke	2:46.40	15	Did not advance	
Alma Shaat	200 m individual medley	2:29.99	18	Did not advance	
Alma Shaat; Farah Fares; Maya Khalil; Valerie Tarazi	4 × 100 m medley relay	4:33.28	10	Did not advance	

Mixed

Athlete	Event	Heat		Final	
Athlete	Event	Time	Rank	Time	Rank
Valerie TaraziAlma Shaat; Jonathan Shaheen; Mahmoud Abugharbia	4 × 200 m freestyle relay	4:11.76	11	Did not advance	

== Taekwondo ==
Athlete	Event	Round of 16	Quarterfinals	Semifinals	Final	
Athlete	Event	Opposition Result	Opposition Result	Opposition Result	Opposition Result	Rank
Omar Yaser Ismail	Men's –80 kg	–	–	–	–	

== Triathlon ==
Athlete	Event	Time						Rank
Athlete	Event	Swim (0.75 km)	Trans 1	Bike (20 km)	Trans 2	Run (5 km)	Total	Rank
Abdelrahman Tantish	Men's individual	9:47	0:35	29:24	0:17	18:21	58:24	22

== Weightlifting ==
Athlete	Event	Snatch		Clean & Jerk		Total	Rank
Athlete	Event	Result	Rank	Result	Rank	Total	Rank
Mohammed Hamada	Men's −110 kg						

== Wrestling ==
Palestine entered three wrestlers.

Key:

- VT (ranking points: 5–0 or 0–5) – Victory by fall.
- VB (ranking points: 5–0 or 0–5) – Victory by injury (VF for forfeit, VA for withdrawal or disqualification)
- PP (ranking points: 3–1 or 1–3) – Decision by points – the loser with technical points.
- PO (ranking points: 3–0 or 0–3) – Decision by points – the loser without technical points.
- ST (ranking points: 4–0 or 0–4) – Great superiority – the loser without technical points and a margin of victory of at least 8 (Greco-Roman) or 10 (freestyle) points.
- SP (ranking points: 4–1 or 1–4) – Technical superiority – the loser with technical points and a margin of victory of at least 8 (Greco-Roman) or 10 (freestyle) points.

Freestyle

Athlete	Event	Round of 32	Round of 16	Quarterfinal	Semifinal	Repechage	Final / BM	
Athlete	Event	Opposition Result	Opposition Result	Opposition Result	Opposition Result	Opposition Result	Opposition Result	Rank
Abdullah Assaf	Men's −65 kg	–	–	–	–	–	–	
Rayyan Aburiala	Men's −86 kg	–	–	–	–	–	–	
Aylah Mayali	Women's −62 kg	—N/a	–	–	–	–	–	
