= Esports at the 2026 Asian Games – Mobile Legends: Bang Bang =

Mobile Legends: Bang Bang at the 2026 Asian Games
- Dates: 29 September – 1 October 2026
- Competitors: 63 from 11 nations

Medalists
gold medal	Myanmar
silver medal	Indonesia
bronze medal	Malaysia
bronze medal	Mongolia

The Mobile Legends: Bang Bang tournament at the 2026 Asian Games is scheduled to be held at the Aichi Sky Expo in Tokoname in Aichi Prefecture, Japan from 29 September to 1 October 2026.

This marked the debut of the video game in the esports events of the Asian Games.

== Qualification ==
The qualification tournament for Mobile Legends: Bang Bang was held at Resorts World Sentosa in Singapore, from 18 to 21 June 2026. Twenty teams were divided into four groups along geographic principles and competed in a round-robin format.

The following teams qualified for the 2026 Asian Games: Top five teams in Group A (Southeast Asia), top two teams in Group B (West Asia), Group C (Central Asia) and Group D (East and South Asia). The final berth was contested by the third placed teams in Groups B and D.

Iran won the final berth in the playoff against Nepal. However Iran was later not part of the main draw.

=== Qualified teams ===
Qualified for the 2026 Asian Games
Qualified for the 2026 Asian Games via playoff (later withdrew)

Group A		Group B		Group C		Group D	
Team	W–L	Team	W–L	Team	W–L	Team	W–L
Philippines	6–1	Saudi Arabia	4–0	Kazakhstan	3–0	Mongolia	4–0
Cambodia	6–1	Jordan	3–1	Uzbekistan	2–1	Hong Kong	3–1
Indonesia	5–2	Iran	2–2	Kyrgyzstan	1–2	Nepal	2–3
Myanmar	4–3	Oman	1–3	Tajikistan	0–3	Pakistan	1–3
Malaysia	3–4	United Arab Emirates	0–4			Sri Lanka	0–4
Vietnam	3–4						
Laos	1–6						
Singapore	0–7						

== Rosters ==
Cambodia	Hong Kong	Indonesia	Jordan
Vongpanha Hok; Meng Kong Hy; Phavin Keo; Chandavan Nhem; Chanmakara Sovan; Oudom Ty	Chan Kit Kuen; Cheung Ming Yun; Cheung Sze Hin; Law Hing Lung; Wang Calvin Jacob; Zheng Ka Yeung	Alexander Owen Marcetami Buhe; Albert Neilsen Iskandar; Arif Fudin Dingarai Putra; Dalvin Ramadhana Putra; Syauki Fauzan Sumarno; Muhammad Affan Wahyudi	Moyad Abdallah; Huthaifa Abuabteh; Mahmoud Al Ali; Yazan Alsawaris; Mohammad Alwahdani; Tharaa Marzouk
Kazakhstan	Saudi Arabia	Malaysia	Mongolia
Bekzat Akhambayev; Ruslan Kussepov; Zhanibek Mamilen; Bekzat Onggarbek; Ulan Salamat; Yerassyl Serik	Muath Al-Koraini; Ayman Al-Qarni; Sulaiman Al-Rashdi; Orayfan Al-Sulaimani; Moayed Kharaba; Mohammed Kharabah	Muhammad Danial Mohamad Fuad; Hazziq Danish Mohamad Rizwan; Muhammad Haqqullah; Muhammad Qayyum Ariffin; Muhammad Danish Fitri Razman; Muhamad Razif Sazali	Tengis Bayarsaikhan; Erdenebileg Erdenesuren; Lkhagvasuren Otgonbayar; Bagabandi Tegshjargal; Ermuunbaatar Tumurbaatar
Myanmar	Philippines	Uzbekistan	
Swe Han Htoo; Oo Hein Htet; Thuya Kyaw; Kyaw Myo Myint Ko Ko; Aung Shine Lin	Jay Pee Dela Cruz; Karl Gabriel Nepomuceno; Alston Pabico; Grant Duane Pillas; Dave Viana Jr.; Sanford Vinuya	Vadim Dolgushin; Amirbek Mamaradulov; Amirbek Rustamov; Shohjakhon Yoriev; Georgiy Zotov	

== Draw ==
The main draw was made in September 2026.

== Format ==
The teams were drawn in groups of three except the fourth and last group which only has two. The top two teams will advance to the knockout stages which consists of a quarterfinals, semifinals, and grand final. In Group D, the two teams will advance to the knockout stage but their performance will determine the seeding.

Games are in a best-of-three format while the grand final witll be a best-of-seven.

== Group stage ==
=== Group A ===
Pos	Team	Pld	W	L	GF	GA	Qualification
1	Myanmar	2	2	0	4	0	Quarterfinals
2	Hong Kong	2	1	1	2	3	Quarterfinals
3	Uzbekistan	2	0	2	1	4	

Source: Asian Games 2026

Date	Time		Score		Set 1	Set 2	Set 3
29 September	9:00	Myanmar	2–0	Uzbekistan	1–0	1–0	—N/a
29 September	10:55	Uzbekistan	1–2	Hong Kong	0–1	1–0	0–1
29 September	12:50	Myanmar	2–0	Hong Kong	1–0	1–0	—N/a

=== Group B ===
Pos	Team	Pld	W	L	GF	GA	Qualification
1	Malaysia	2	2	0	4	1	Quarterfinals
2	Indonesia	2	1	1	2	2	Quarterfinals
3	Saudi Arabia	2	0	2	1	4	

Source: Asian Games 2026

Date	Time		Score		Set 1	Set 2	Set 3
29 September	9:00	Indonesia	0–2	Malaysia	0–1	0–1	—N/a
29 September	10:55	Malaysia	2–1	Saudi Arabia	0–1	1–0	1–0
29 September	12:50	Indonesia	2–0	Saudi Arabia	1–0	1–0	—N/a

=== Group C ===
Pos	Team	Pld	W	L	GF	GA	Qualification
1	Philippines	2	2	0	4	0	Quarterfinals
2	Jordan	2	1	1	2	3	Quarterfinals
3	Kazakhstan	2	0	2	1	4	

Source: Asian Games 2026

Date	Time		Score		Set 1	Set 2	Set 3
29 September	15:00	Philippines	2–0	Jordan	1–0	1–0	—N/a
29 September	16:55	Jordan	2–1	Kazakhstan	1–0	0–1	1–0
29 September	18:50	Philippines	2–0	Kazakhstan	1–0	1–0	—N/a

=== Group D ===
Pos	Team	Pld	W	L	GF	GA	Qualification
1	Mongolia	1	1	0	2	0	Quarterfinals
2	Cambodia	1	0	1	0	2	Quarterfinals

Source: Asian Games 2026

Date	Time		Score		Set 1	Set 2	Set 3
29 September	15:00	Cambodia	0–2	Mongolia	0–1	0–1	—N/a

== Knockout stage ==
Quarterfinals
A1	Myanmar	2
D2	Cambodia	1
B1	Malaysia	2
C2	Jordan	0
C1	Philippines	1
B2	Indonesia	2
D1	Mongolia	2
A2	Hong Kong	0

Semifinals
A1	Myanmar	2
B1	Malaysia	0
B2	Indonesia	2
D1	Mongolia	0

Finals
A1	Myanmar	4
B2	Indonesia	0

Source: Asian Games 2026

=== Quarterfinals ===
Date	Time		Score		Set 1	Set 2	Set 3
30 September	9:00	Myanmar	2–1	Cambodia	0–1	1–0	1–0
30 September	10:55	Malaysia	2–0	Jordan	1–0	1–0	—N/a
30 September	12:50	Philippines	1–2	Indonesia	0–1	1–0	0–1
30 September	14:45	Mongolia	2–0	Hong Kong	1–0	1–0	—N/a

=== Semifinals ===
Date	Time		Score		Set 1	Set 2	Set 3
30 September	17:00	Myanmar	2–0	Malaysia	1–0	1–0	—N/a
30 September	18:35	Indonesia	2–0	Mongolia	1–0	1–0	—N/a

=== Finals ===
Date	Time		Score		Set 1	Set 2	Set 3	Set 4	Set 5	Set 6	Set 7
1 October	14:00	Myanmar	4–0	Indonesia	1–0	1–0	1–0	1–0	—N/a		
