= Ju-jitsu at the 2026 Asian Games – Men's 77 kg =

Men's jiu-jitsu 77 kg at the 2026 Asian Games
- Venue: Aichi Budokan
- Dates: 2 October 2026
- Competitors: 25 from 15 nations

Medalists
gold medal	Mahdi Al-Awlaqi	United Arab Emirates
silver medal	Mahmoud Jabr	Jordan
bronze medal	Seiilkhan Bolatbek	Kazakhstan
bronze medal	Park Jae-woon	South Korea

The men's jiu-jitsu (ne-waza) 77 kilograms Ju-jitsu competition at the 2026 Asian Games in Nagoya was held on 2 October 2026 at Aichi Budokan.

== Schedule ==
All times are Japan Standard Time (UTC+09:00)

Date	Time	Event
Friday, 2 October 2026	09:00	Elimination round of 32
Friday, 2 October 2026	10:12	Elimination round of 16
Friday, 2 October 2026	11:16	Quarterfinals
Friday, 2 October 2026	11:48	Semifinals
Friday, 2 October 2026	12:04	Repechage
Friday, 2 October 2026	14:30	Contests for bronze medals
Friday, 2 October 2026	14:46	Final

== Results ==
Legend

- SU — Won by submission (50–0)
- ADV — Won by advantages
- PNT — Won by penalties
- DSQ — Won by disqualification
- WO — Won by walkover
- INJ — Won by injury

=== Main bracket ===
==== Final ====
Final
Mahdi Al-Awlaqi (UAE)	2
Mahmoud Jabr (JOR)	0

==== Top half ====
Elimination round of 32
Antonio Luigi Dy (PHI)	0
Monkhtoriin Davaadorj (MGL)	3
Koo Bon-cheol (KOR)	2
Kampanart Polput (THA)	0
Adam Akasyah (MAS)	50^{SU}
Alaaldin Al-Kuzai (JOR)	0
Shinji Morito (JPN)	50^{SU}
Adam Sofian Fernani (KSA)	0
Lim Paul Tian Zhi (SGP)	0
Baigazy Bagyshbekov (KGZ)	2

Elimination round of 16
Mahdi Al-Awlaqi (UAE)	4
Monkhtoriin Davaadorj (MGL)	0
Koo Bon-cheol (KOR)	2
Adam Akasyah (MAS)	0
Amro Mohammed Fadhil Al-Sammarraie (IRQ)	0^{INJ}
Shinji Morito (JPN)	0
Baigazy Bagyshbekov (KGZ)	0
Adlan Madayev (KAZ)	0^{ADV}

Quarterfinals
Mahdi Al-Awlaqi (UAE)	50^{SU}
Koo Bon-cheol (KOR)	0
Amro Mohammed Fadhil Al-Sammarraie (IRQ)	0
Adlan Madayev (KAZ)	50^{INJ}

Semifinals
Mahdi Al-Awlaqi (UAE)	0^{ADV}
Adlan Madayev (KAZ)	0

==== Bottom half ====
Elimination round of 32
Mark Constance Vergel (PHI)	0
Shinezorig Bulgankhuu (MGL)	2
Fahad Alhammadi (UAE)	2
Nguyễn Tất Lộc (VIE)	0
Adilet Chamashov (KGZ)	0
Sayedahmad Behbehani (KUW)	7
Usaamah Haashim Saleh (KSA)	0
Tan Jedd Shi Jie (SGP)	0^{ADV}

Elimination round of 16
Park Jae-woon (KOR)	11
Shinezorig Bulgankhuu (MGL)	0
Fahad Alhammadi (UAE)	0
Chanwit Aunjai (THA)	2
Mahmoud Jabr (JOR)	4
Sayedahmad Behbehani (KUW)	0
Tan Jedd Shi Jie (SGP)	0
Seiilkhan Bolatbek (KAZ)	50^{SU}

Quarterfinals
Park Jae-woon (KOR)	50^{SU}
Chanwit Aunjai (THA)	0
Mahmoud Jabr (JOR)	0^{ADV}
Seiilkhan Bolatbek (KAZ)	0

Semifinals
Park Jae-woon (KOR)	0
Mahmoud Jabr (JOR)	0^{PNT}

=== Repechage ===
Repechage round 1
Koo Bon-cheol (KOR)	0^{WO}
Amro Mohammed Fadhil Al-Sammarraie (IRQ)	0
Chanwit Aunjai (THA)	0
Seiilkhan Bolatbek (KAZ)	50^{SU}

Contests for bronze medals
Koo Bon-cheol (KOR)	4
Park Jae-woon (KOR)	6
Seiilkhan Bolatbek (KAZ)	2
Adlan Madayev (KAZ)	0
