= Ju-jitsu at the 2026 Asian Games – Men's 69 kg =

Men's jiu-jitsu 69 kg at the 2026 Asian Games
- Venue: Aichi Budokan
- Dates: 1 October 2026
- Competitors: 35 from 20 nations

Medalists
gold medal	Ahmed Andeez	United Arab Emirates
silver medal	Nurzhan Batyrbekov	Kazakhstan
bronze medal	Joo Seong-hyeon	South Korea
bronze medal	Mohammed Bin Huraymil	Saudi Arabia

The men's jiu-jitsu (ne-waza) 69 kilograms Ju-jitsu competition at the 2026 Asian Games in Nagoya was held on 1 October 2026 at Aichi Budokan.

== Schedule ==
All times are Japan Standard Time (UTC+09:00)

Date	Time	Event
Thursday, 1 October 2026	09:00	Elimination round of 64
Thursday, 1 October 2026	09:15	Elimination round of 32
Thursday, 1 October 2026	10:35	Elimination round of 16
Thursday, 1 October 2026	11:15	Quarterfinals
Thursday, 1 October 2026	11:35	Semifinals
Thursday, 1 October 2026	11:45	Repechage
Thursday, 1 October 2026	15:45	Contests for bronze medals
Thursday, 1 October 2026	15:55	Final

== Results ==
Legend

- SU — Won by submission (50–0)
- ADV — Won by advantages
- PNT — Won by penalties
- DSQ — Won by disqualification
- WO — Won by walkover

=== Main bracket ===
==== Final ====
Final
Nurzhan Batyrbekov (KAZ)	0
Ahmed Andeez (UAE)	2

==== Top half ====
Elimination round of 64
Kenshin Kumada (JPN)	0
Omar Al-Fadhli (UAE)	5

Elimination round of 32
Nurzhan Batyrbekov (KAZ)	5
Omar Al-Fadhli (UAE)	0
Sopheara Sao (CAM)	0
Lee Jae-young (KOR)	50^{SU}
Marc Alexander Lim (PHI)	2
Tuvdentarvaa Choijamts (MGL)	2
Đặng Đình Tùng (VIE)	0
Izzeddin Owdetallah (PLE)	0^{ADV}
Ramazan Tiangube (KGZ)	6
Sarin Soonthorn (THA)	2
Elbek Rahmatullayev (UZB)	11
Nasim Abdualimov (TJK)	0
Elyas Zwawi Banjar (KSA)	2^{PNT}
Mahmoud Ghul (JOR)	2
Yousef Aldousari (KUW)	0
Lim Noah Tian Run (SGP)	0^{ADV}

Elimination round of 16
Nurzhan Batyrbekov (KAZ)	8
Lee Jae-young (KOR)	2
Marc Alexander Lim (PHI)	2
Đặng Đình Tùng (VIE)	0
Ramazan Tiangube (KGZ)	0^{ADV}
Elbek Rahmatullayev (UZB)	0
Elyas Zwawi Banjar (KSA)	0
Lim Noah Tian Run (SGP)	50^{SU}

Quarterfinals
Nurzhan Batyrbekov (KAZ)	4
Marc Alexander Lim (PHI)	2
Ramazan Tiangube (KGZ)	0
Lim Noah Tian Run (SGP)	4

Semifinals
Nurzhan Batyrbekov (KAZ)	7
Lim Noah Tian Run (SGP)	0

==== Bottom half ====
Elimination round of 64
Turbold Oktyabri (MGL)	0
Seiya Fukushima (JPN)	13
Ali Ashkanani (KUW)	4
Yman Xavier Baluyo (PHI)	0

Elimination round of 32
Alinur Kuatuly (KAZ)	0^{ADV}
Seiya Fukushima (JPN)	0
William Chan Om-Feld (CAM)	0
Ahmed Andeez (UAE)	4
Mohammad Sarwar Hussaini (AFG)	50^{SU}
Le Trong Hoang (VIE)	0
Hsu Ching-chih (TPE)	0
Argen Abdymanapov (KGZ)	0^{ADV}
Kunnapong Hasdee (THA)	2^{ADV}
Sirojbek Rustamov (UZB)	2
Mahmudjon Nazrizoda (TJK)	0
Mohammed Bin Huraymil (KSA)	50^{SU}
Chindavone Syvanevilay (LAO)	0
Mohammad Omet (JOR)	50^{SU}
Ali Ashkanani (KUW)	0
Joo Seong-hyeon (KOR)	2

Elimination round of 16
Alinur Kuatuly (KAZ)	0
Ahmed Andeez (UAE)	0^{ADV}
Mohammad Sarwar Hussaini (AFG)	0
Argen Abdymanapov (KGZ)	2
Kunnapong Hasdee (THA)	0
Mohammed Bin Huraymil (KSA)	50^{SU}
Mohammad Omet (JOR)	0
Joo Seong-hyeon (KOR)	2

Quarterfinals
Ahmed Andeez (UAE)	2
Argen Abdymanapov (KGZ)	0
Mohammed Bin Huraymil (KSA)	2
Joo Seong-hyeon (KOR)	2^{ADV}

Semifinals
Ahmed Andeez (UAE)	2^{WO}
Joo Seong-hyeon (KOR)	0

=== Repechage ===
Repechage round 1
Marc Alexander Lim (PHI)	2^{ADV}
Ramazan Tiangube (KGZ)	2
Argen Abdymanapov (KGZ)	2
Mohammed Bin Huraymil (KSA)	4^{DSQ}

Contests for bronze medals
Marc Alexander Lim (PHI)	2
Joo Seong-hyeon (KOR)	2^{ADV}
Mohammed Bin Huraymil (KSA)	4^{ADV}
Lim Noah Tian Run (SGP)	0
