= Ju-jitsu at the 2026 Asian Games – Men's 94 kg =

Men's jiu-jitsu 94 kg at the 2026 Asian Games
- Venue: Aichi Budokan
- Dates: 2 October 2026
- Competitors: 21 from 15 nations

Medalists
gold medal	Omar Nada	Saudi Arabia
silver medal	Park Sung-hu	South Korea
bronze medal	Amaar Al-Hosani	United Arab Emirates
bronze medal	Kim Hee-dong	South Korea

The men's jiu-jitsu (ne-waza) 94 kilograms Ju-jitsu competition at the 2026 Asian Games in Nagoya was held on 2 October 2026 at Aichi Budokan.

== Schedule ==
All times are Japan Standard Time (UTC+09:00)

Date	Time	Event
Friday, 2 October 2026	09:00	Elimination round of 32
Friday, 2 October 2026	09:40	Elimination round of 16
Friday, 2 October 2026	10:44	Quarterfinals
Friday, 2 October 2026	11:16	Semifinals
Friday, 2 October 2026	11:32	Repechage
Friday, 2 October 2026	14:54	Contests for bronze medals
Friday, 2 October 2026	15:10	Final

== Results ==
Legend

- SU — Won by submission (50–0)
- ADV — Won by advantages
- PNT — Won by penalties
- DSQ — Won by disqualification
- WO — Won by walkover

=== Main bracket ===
==== Final ====
Final
Park Sung-hu (KOR)	0
Omar Nada (KSA)	50^{SU}

==== Top half ====
Elimination round of 32
Mohammed Al-Emadi (QAT)	0
Lê Minh Nhựt (VIE)	2
Yanal Qardan (JOR)	0
Baasandorjiin Ariuntsog (MGL)	6
Abdul Baset Rahimi (AFG)	0
Pooriya Taherkhani (IRI)	50^{SU}

Elimination round of 16
Amaar Al-Hosani (UAE)	22
Lê Minh Nhựt (VIE)	0
Khaled Faraj (BRN)	0
Park Sung-hu (KOR)	5
Romeo John Alfred Raphael Arellano (PHI)	6
Baasandorjiin Ariuntsog (MGL)	2
Pooriya Taherkhani (IRI)	2
Maxat Tolendi (KAZ)	0

Quarterfinals
Amaar Al-Hosani (UAE)	0
Park Sung-hu (KOR)	4
Romeo John Alfred Raphael Arellano (PHI)	0
Pooriya Taherkhani (IRI)	0^{ADV}

Semifinals
Park Sung-hu (KOR)	2
Pooriya Taherkhani (IRI)	0

==== Bottom half ====
Elimination round of 32
Ruslan Sagdeev (KGZ)	2
Lê Duy Thanh (VIE)	0
Emad Alsumait (KUW)	2
Gantulga Galsandorj (MGL)	3

Elimination round of 16
Omar Nada (KSA)	50^{SU}
Ruslan Sagdeev (KGZ)	0
Rakpol Polput (THA)	0
Abdulla Dabyl (KAZ)	50^{SU}
Kim Hee-dong (KOR)	2^{ADV}
Fawaz Haddadin (JOR)	2
Gantulga Galsandorj (MGL)	0
Abdullha Kubaisi (UAE)	0^{ADV}

Quarterfinals
Omar Nada (KSA)	6
Abdulla Dabyl (KAZ)	0
Kim Hee-dong (KOR)	0
Abdullha Kubaisi (UAE)	8

Semifinals
Omar Nada (KSA)	0^{ADV}
Abdullha Kubaisi (UAE)	0

=== Repechage ===
Repechage round 1
Amaar Al-Hosani (UAE)	2
Romeo John Alfred Raphael Arellano (PHI)	0
Abdulla Dabyl (KAZ)	0
Kim Hee-dong (KOR)	0^{ADV}

Contests for bronze medals
Amaar Al-Hosani (UAE)	0^{WO}
Abdullha Kubaisi (UAE)	0
Kim Hee-dong (KOR)	5
Pooriya Taherkhani (IRI)	2
