= Esports at the 2026 Asian Games – Competitive Martial Arts =

Competitive Martial Arts at the 2026 Asian Games
- Dates: 23–26 September 2026
- Competitors: 39 from 13 nations

Medalists
gold medal	South Korea
silver medal	Japan
bronze medal	Hong Kong
bronze medal	Saudi Arabia

The Competitive Martial Arts esports tournament at the 2026 Asian Games was held at the Aichi Sky Expo in Tokoname in Aichi Prefecture, Japan from 23 to 26 September 2026.

Competitive Martial Arts is a single event covering three fighting games namely Street Fighter 6, Tekken 8, andThe King of Fighters XV. This is a three-player team event.

South Korea won the fighting games esports gold medal, defeating Japan in the finals.

== Rosters ==
NOC	Players
Bahrain	Yusuf Bahram, Mohamed Derbas, Husam Alansari
Chinese Taipei	Lin Chia-hung, Chen You-gang, Chang Chia-tung
Hong Kong	Li Hin Hei, Wong Yuk Cheung, Yeh Man Ho
Japan	Kojiro Higuchi, Daichi Nakayama, Akihito Sawada
Kazakhstan	Roman Dozortsev, Ayan Valeyev , Askar Shukanov
Kyrgyzstan	Dastan Estebesov, Beknazar Kushnazarov, Mukhammadaziz Mukhtarzhanov
Pakistan	Ahmed Shahid, Adeel Ahmad, Atif Ijaz
Palestine	Adham Ketaneh, Amir Khammash, George Dabbah
Saudi Arabia	Shaman Abdullah H. Alzaaqi, Badr Abdulaziz A. Alomair, Osama Mohammed S. Alhujili
South Korea	Lee Kwang-noh, Yeon Jeag-il, Bae Jae-min
Thailand	Nopparut Hempamorn, Sitta Chantasriviroje, Ekkarat Sumalai
United Arab Emirates	Abdulla Almheiri, Mohammad Albanna, Sultan Taheri
Syria	Nour Alsaadi, Hazar Salloum, Moaoia Alhmadi

Source: Asian Games 2026

== Group stage ==
=== Group A ===
Pos	Team	Pld	W	L	GW	GL	Diff.	PW	PL	Diff.	Qualification
1	Thailand	3	2	1	17	11	+6	17	11	+6	Advance to Quarterfinals
2	Chinese Taipei	3	2	1	11	12	−1	11	12	−1	Advance to Quarterfinals
3	Pakistan	3	2	1	17	10	+7	17	10	+7	
4	Syria	3	0	3	0	12	−12	0	12	−12	

Source: Asian Games 2026

Date	Time		Score		Set 1	Set 2	Set 3	Set 4	Set 5
23 September	13:00	Thailand	3–1	Pakistan	2–1	2–0	0–2	2–1	—N/a
23 September	13:00	Chinese Taipei	Forefeit	Syria	DNS				
23 September	15:00	Thailand	2–3	Chinese Taipei	2–0	0–2	0–2	2–1	1–2
23 September	15:00	Pakistan	3–0	Syria	2–0	2–0	2–0	—N/a	—N/a
23 September	17:00	Thailand	3–0	Syria	2–0	2–0	2–0	—N/a	—N/a
23 September	17:00	Pakistan	3–2	Chinese Taipei	0–2	2–0	2–0	1–2	2–0

=== Group B ===
Pos	Team	Pld	W	L	GW	GL	Diff.	PW	PL	Diff.	Qualification
1	Japan (H)	2	2	0	12	1	+11	12	1	+11	Advance to Quarterfinals
2	United Arab Emirates	2	1	1	7	6	+1	7	6	+1	Advance to Quarterfinals
3	Palestine	2	0	2	0	12	−12	0	12	−12	

Source: Asian Games 2026
(H) Host

Date	Time		Score		Set 1	Set 2	Set 3	Set 4	Set 5
23 September	13:00	Japan	3–0	United Arab Emirates	2–0	2–0	2–1	—N/a	—N/a
23 September	15:00	United Arab Emirates	3–0	Palestine	2–0	2–0	2–0	—N/a	—N/a
23 September	17:00	Japan	3–0	Palestine	2–0	2–0	2–0	—N/a	—N/a

=== Group C ===
Pos	Team	Pld	W	L	GW	GL	Diff.	PW	PL	Diff.	Qualification
1	Saudi Arabia	2	2	0	12	4	+8	35	13	+22	Advance to Quarterfinals
2	Bahrain	2	1	1	10	7	+3	28	25	+3	Advance to Quarterfinals
3	Kyrgyzstan	2	0	2	1	12	−11	7	32	−25	

Source: Asian Games 2026

Date	Time		Score		Set 1	Set 2	Set 3	Set 4	Set 5
24 September	9:00	Saudi Arabia	3–0	Kyrgyzstan	2–0	2–0	2–0	—N/a	—N/a
24 September	11:00	Kyrgyzstan	0–3	Bahrain	0–2	1–2	0–2	—N/a	—N/a
24 September	13:45	Saudi Arabia	3–1	Bahrain	0–2	2–1	2–0	2–1	—N/a

=== Group D ===
Pos	Team	Pld	W	L	GW	GL	Diff.	PW	PL	Diff.	Qualification
1	South Korea	2	2	0	12	1	+11	34	8	+26	Advance to Quarterfinals
2	Hong Kong	2	1	1	8	10	−2	27	31	−4	Advance to Quarterfinals
3	Kazakhstan	2	0	2	4	13	−9	15	37	−22	

Source: Asian Games 2026

Date	Time		Score		Set 1	Set 2	Set 3	Set 4	Set 5
24 September	9:00	Hong Kong	3–2	Kazakhstan	2–0	1–2	2–0	0–2	2–0
24 September	11:00	Kazakhstan	0–3	South Korea	0–2	0–2	0–2	—N/a	—N/a
24 September	13:45	Hong Kong	0–3	South Korea	0–2	1–2	0–2	—N/a	—N/a

== Knockout stage ==
Quarterfinals
A1	Thailand	2
B4	Hong Kong	3
B2	Japan	3
A3	Bahrain	1
A2	Saudi Arabia	3
B3	United Arab Emirates	1
B1	South Korea	3
A4	Chinese Taipei	0

Semifinals
A1	Hong Kong	0
B2	Japan	3
A2	Saudi Arabia	1
B1	South Korea	3

Finals
A1	Japan	2
A2	South Korea	5

Source: Asian Games 2026

=== Quarterfinals ===
Date	Time		Score		Set 1	Set 2	Set 3	Set 4	Set 5
25 September	9:00	Thailand	2–3	Hong Kong	0–2	2–0	1–2	2–0	0–2
25 September	11:00	Japan	3–1	Bahrain	2–0	0–2	2–0	2–0	—N/a
25 September	12:45	Saudi Arabia	3–1	United Arab Emirates	2–0	1–2	2–1	0–2	—N/a
25 September	14:30	South Korea	3–0	Chinese Taipei	2–0	2–0	2–0	—N/a	—N/a

=== Semifinals ===
Date	Time		Score		Set 1	Set 2	Set 3	Set 4	Set 5
25 September	17:00	Hong Kong	0–3	Japan	0–2	0–2	0–2	—N/a	—N/a
25 September	19:00	Saudi Arabia	1–3	South Korea	0–2	1–2	2–1	0–2	—N/a

=== Finals ===
Date	Time		Score		Set 1	Set 2	Set 3	Set 4	Set 5	Set 6	Set 7
26 September	16:00	Japan	2–5	South Korea	2–1	1–2	2–1	0–2	1–2	0–2	0–2
