= Ju-jitsu at the 2026 Asian Games – Men's 62 kg =

Men's jiu-jitsu 62 kg at the 2026 Asian Games
- Venue: Aichi Budokan
- Dates: 1 October 2026
- Competitors: 28 from 18 nations

Medalists
gold medal	Khaled Al-Shehhi	United Arab Emirates
silver medal	Omar Al-Suwaidi	United Arab Emirates
bronze medal	Abdulmalik Al-Murdhi	Saudi Arabia
bronze medal	Khaled Habab	Saudi Arabia

The men's jiu-jitsu (ne-waza) 62 kilograms Ju-jitsu competition at the 2026 Asian Games in Nagoya was held on 1 October 2026 at Aichi Budokan.

== Schedule ==
All times are Japan Standard Time (UTC+09:00)

Date	Time	Event
Thursday, 1 October 2026	09:00	Elimination round of 32
Thursday, 1 October 2026	10:00	Elimination round of 16
Thursday, 1 October 2026	10:40	Quarterfinals
Thursday, 1 October 2026	11:00	Semifinals
Thursday, 1 October 2026	11:10	Repechage
Thursday, 1 October 2026	15:30	Contests for bronze medals
Thursday, 1 October 2026	15:40	Final

== Results ==
Legend

- SU — Won by submission (50–0)
- ADV — Won by advantages
- PNT — Won by penalties
- DSQ — Won by disqualification
- WO — Won by walkover

=== Main bracket ===
==== Final ====
Final
Khaled Al-Shehhi (UAE)	0^{ADV}
Omar Al-Suwaidi (UAE)	0

==== Top half ====
Elimination round of 32
Hiryu Niwa (JPN)	8
Sophanuth Sor (CAM)	0
Sarvarbek Rakhmonberdiev (UZB)	4
Myron Myles Mangubat (PHI)	2
Khushdil Jafarov (TJK)	0
Olziitogtokhyn Erdenebaatar (MGL)	0^{DSQ}
Daniiar Zhamankulov (KGZ)	4
Naphat Mathupan (THA)	2
Mohammed Ajaj (PLE)	0
Khaled Habab (KSA)	0^{ADV}
Yang Byeong-jun (KOR)	0^{ADV}
Cần Văn Thắng (VIE)	0

Elimination round of 16
Khaled Al-Shehhi (UAE)	2
Hiryu Niwa (JPN)	0
Sarvarbek Rakhmonberdiev (UZB)	0
Olziitogtokhyn Erdenebaatar (MGL)	0^{ADV}
Daniiar Zhamankulov (KGZ)	0
Khaled Habab (KSA)	0^{ADV}
Yang Byeong-jun (KOR)	0
Abdulla Batyrbek (KAZ)	2

Quarterfinals
Khaled Al-Shehhi (UAE)	0^{ADV}
Olziitogtokhyn Erdenebaatar (MGL)	0
Khaled Habab (KSA)	2
Abdulla Batyrbek (KAZ)	4

Semifinals
Khaled Al-Shehhi (UAE)	2^{ADV}
Abdulla Batyrbek (KAZ)	2

==== Bottom half ====
Elimination round of 32
Omar Al-Suwaidi (UAE)	50^{SU}
Khamkeo Vilayphone (LAO)	0
Kaimoni Richhavath Operana (CAM)	50^{SU}
Abubakr Abdusalomov (UZB)	0
Santino Luis Luzuriaga (PHI)	0
Batsuuriin Bayartulga (MGL)	2
Taalaibek Baiyshev (KGZ)	2^{ADV}
Suwijak Kuntong (THA)	2
Abdulla Ali (BRN)	7
Noorullah Shafayee (AFG)	2
Choi Hyeon-myeong (KOR)	0^{DSQ}
Saeed Al-Abdulla (QAT)	0

Elimination round of 16
Batyr Tenizbay (KAZ)	0
Omar Al-Suwaidi (UAE)	2
Kaimoni Richhavath Operana (CAM)	50^{SU}
Batsuuriin Bayartulga (MGL)	0
Taalaibek Baiyshev (KGZ)	2
Abdulla Ali (BRN)	0
Choi Hyeon-myeong (KOR)	0
Abdulmalik Al-Murdhi (KSA)	50^{SU}

Quarterfinals
Omar Al-Suwaidi (UAE)	50^{SU}
Kaimoni Richhavath Operana (CAM)	0
Taalaibek Baiyshev (KGZ)	2
Abdulmalik Al-Murdhi (KSA)	0

Semifinals
Omar Al-Suwaidi (UAE)	4
Taalaibek Baiyshev (KGZ)	0

=== Repechage ===
Repechage round 1
Olziitogtokhyn Erdenebaatar (MGL)	0
Khaled Habab (KSA)	50^{SU}
Kaimoni Richhavath Operana (CAM)	0
Abdulmalik Al-Murdhi (KSA)	3

Contests for bronze medals
Khaled Habab (KSA)	0^{ADV}
Taalaibek Baiyshev (KGZ)	0
Abdulmalik Al-Murdhi (KSA)	0^{ADV}
Abdulla Batyrbek (KAZ)	0
