= Ju-jitsu at the 2026 Asian Games – Men's 85 kg =

Men's jiu-jitsu 85 kg at the 2026 Asian Games
- Venue: Aichi Budokan
- Dates: 3 October 2026
- Competitors: 26 from 16 nations

Medalists
| gold medal | Abdullah Tariq Nada | Saudi Arabia |
| silver medal | Merey Kabdullayev | Kazakhstan |
| bronze medal | Kim Min-gyu | South Korea |
| bronze medal | Abdurahman Murtazaliev | Kyrgyzstan |

The men's jiu-jitsu (ne-waza) 85 kilograms Ju-jitsu competition at the 2026 Asian Games in Nagoya was held on 3 October 2026 at Aichi Budokan.

== Schedule ==
All times are Japan Standard Time (UTC+09:00)

| Date | Time | Event |
|---|---|---|
| Saturday, 3 October 2026 | 09:00 | Elimination round of 32 |
| Saturday, 3 October 2026 | 10:10 | Elimination round of 16 |
| Saturday, 3 October 2026 | 11:06 | Quarterfinals |
| Saturday, 3 October 2026 | 11:34 | Semifinals |
| Saturday, 3 October 2026 | 11:48 | Repechage |
| Saturday, 3 October 2026 | 13:00 | Contests for bronze medals |
| Saturday, 3 October 2026 | 13:16 | Final |

== Results ==
Legend

- SU — Won by submission (50–0)
- ADV — Won by advantages
- PNT — Won by penalties
- DSQ — Won by disqualification
- WO — Won by walkover

=== Main bracket ===
==== Final ====
| Final |
| Abdullah Tariq Nada (KSA) | 7 |
| Merey Kabdullayev (KAZ) | 0 |

==== Top half ====
Elimination round of 32
Kim Min-gyu (KOR) | 50^{SU}
Imran Magomedov (KGZ) | 0
Aacus Ee (SGP) | 50^{SU}
Nguyễn Tiến Triển (VIE) | 0
Ahmad Al-Quradaghi (QAT) | 10
Alisher Gharibshoev (TJK) | 2
Go Utsugi (JPN) | 50^{SU}
Sukitpeerarat Jantanakha (THA) | 0
Vito Luis Luzuriaga (PHI) | 4
Bayarkhuugiin Altangerel (MGL) | 7

Elimination round of 16
Saeed Al-Kubaisi (UAE) | 2
Kim Min-gyu (KOR) | 4
Aacus Ee (SGP) | 50^{SU}
Ahmad Al-Quradaghi (QAT) | 0
Yousef Abualragheb (JOR) | 0
Go Utsugi (JPN) | 0^{ADV}
Bayarkhuugiin Altangerel (MGL) | 0
Abdullah Tariq Nada (KSA) | 50^{SU}

Quarterfinals
Kim Min-gyu (KOR) | 9
Aacus Ee (SGP) | 0
Go Utsugi (JPN) | 0
Abdullah Tariq Nada (KSA) | 50^{SU}

Semifinals
Kim Min-gyu (KOR) | 2
Abdullah Tariq Nada (KSA) | 6

==== Bottom half ====
Elimination round of 32
Song Tae-mu (KOR) | 4
Ahmed Saad Alessa (KSA) | 0
Abdurahman Murtazaliev (KGZ) | 0^{ADV}
Naser Abdulkareem (KUW) | 0
Faraj Al-Awlaqi (UAE) | 5
Ramshed Abdulloev (TJK) | 2
Osama Nabas (JOR) | 50^{SU}
Thanaphat Polput (THA) | 0
David Miranda (PHI) | 0
Batbayar Batsukh (MGL) | 50^{SU}

Elimination round of 16
Ali Imanverdiyev (KAZ) | 0
Song Tae-mu (KOR) | 2
Abdurahman Murtazaliev (KGZ) | 50^{SU}
Sopanha Moeun Lim (CAM) | 0
Faraj Al-Awlaqi (UAE) | 0
Osama Nabas (JOR) | 2
Batbayar Batsukh (MGL) | 2
Merey Kabdullayev (KAZ) | 2^{ADV}

Quarterfinals
Song Tae-mu (KOR) | 0
Abdurahman Murtazaliev (KGZ) | 0^{ADV}
Osama Nabas (JOR) | 0
Merey Kabdullayev (KAZ) | 0^{ADV}

Semifinals
Abdurahman Murtazaliev (KGZ) | 2
Merey Kabdullayev (KAZ) | 4

=== Repechage ===
Repechage round 1
Aacus Ee (SGP) | 50^{SU}
Go Utsugi (JPN) | 0
Song Tae-mu (KOR) | 50^{SU}
Osama Nabas (JOR) | 0

Contests for bronze medals
Aacus Ee (SGP) | 0
Abdurahman Murtazaliev (KGZ) | 2
Song Tae-mu (KOR) | 2
Kim Min-gyu (KOR) | 3
