= Ju-jitsu at the 2026 Asian Games – Women's 63 kg =

Women's jiu-jitsu 63 kg at the 2026 Asian Games
- Venue: Aichi Budokan
- Dates: 3 October 2026
- Competitors: 23 from 14 nations

Medalists
gold medal	Orapa Senatham	Thailand
silver medal	Alexandria Luz Enriquez	Philippines
bronze medal	Narankhishig Baasanjargal	Mongolia
bronze medal	Marian Zhuravleva	Kazakhstan

The women's jiu-jitsu (ne-waza) 63 kilograms Ju-jitsu competition at the 2026 Asian Games in Nagoya was held on 3 October 2026 at Aichi Budokan.

== Schedule ==
All times are Japan Standard Time (UTC+09:00)

Date	Time	Event
Saturday, 3 October 2026	09:00	Elimination round of 32
Saturday, 3 October 2026	09:49	Elimination round of 16
Saturday, 3 October 2026	10:45	Quarterfinals
Saturday, 3 October 2026	11:13	Semifinals
Saturday, 3 October 2026	11:27	Repechage
Saturday, 3 October 2026	13:24	Contests for bronze medals
Saturday, 3 October 2026	13:40	Final

== Results ==
Legend

- SU — Won by submission (50–0)
- ADV — Won by advantages
- PNT — Won by penalties
- WO — Won by walkover

=== Main bracket ===
==== Final ====
Final
Alexandria Luz Enriquez (PHI)	0
Orapa Senatham (THA)	0^{ADV}

==== Top half ====
Elimination round of 32
Low Hui Min Tiffany (SGP)	0
Nguyễn Thị Minh Vượng (VIE)	2
Choi Hee-joo (KOR)	2
Nasim Mohammadibandbouni (IRI)	0
Madineh Sharifi (AFG)	0
Dania Obaid (PLE)	50^{SU}

Elimination round of 16
Shamma Alkalbani (UAE)	0
Nguyễn Thị Minh Vượng (VIE)	2
Narankhishig Baasanjargal (MGL)	0^{ADV}
Aksarapak Sirimak (THA)	0
Marian Zhuravleva (KAZ)	2
Choi Hee-joo (KOR)	0
Dania Obaid (PLE)	0
Alexandria Luz Enriquez (PHI)	50^{SU}

Quarterfinals
Nguyễn Thị Minh Vượng (VIE)	0
Narankhishig Baasanjargal (MGL)	2
Marian Zhuravleva (KAZ)	0
Alexandria Luz Enriquez (PHI)	50^{SU}

Semifinals
Narankhishig Baasanjargal (MGL)	0
Alexandria Luz Enriquez (PHI)	50^{SU}

==== Bottom half ====
Elimination round of 32
Aysha Aljneibi (UAE)	13
Ngô Thị Thảo Vân (VIE)	0
Khaliun Enkhbaatar (MGL)	0
Andrea Lois Lao (PHI)	50^{SU}
Ee Yin Jaslyn (SGP)	0
Shen Yu-chin (TPE)	3
Ai Yoshinaga (JPN)	3
Shahrzad Khoshnoudzadeh (IRI)	2

Elimination round of 16
Orapa Senatham (THA)	50^{SU}
Aysha Aljneibi (UAE)	0
Andrea Lois Lao (PHI)	0
Azhar Salykova (KAZ)	0^{ADV}
Maya Ishakat (JOR)	50^{SU}
Shen Yu-chin (TPE)	0
Ai Yoshinaga (JPN)	0
Sung Ki-ra (KOR)	2

Quarterfinals
Orapa Senatham (THA)	50^{SU}
Andrea Lois Lao (PHI)	0
Maya Ishakat (JOR)	50^{SU}
Sung Ki-ra (KOR)	0

Semifinals
Orapa Senatham (THA)	50^{SU}
Maya Ishakat (JOR)	0

=== Repechage ===
Repechage round 1
Nguyễn Thị Minh Vượng (VIE)	0
Marian Zhuravleva (KAZ)	2
Andrea Lois Lao (PHI)	0^{WO}
Sung Ki-ra (KOR)	0

Contests for bronze medals
Marian Zhuravleva (KAZ)	2
Maya Ishakat (JOR)	0
Andrea Lois Lao (PHI)	0
Narankhishig Baasanjargal (MGL)	2
