= Ju-jitsu at the 2026 Asian Games – Women's 48 kg =

Women's jiu-jitsu 48 kg at the 2026 Asian Games
- Venue: Aichi Budokan
- Dates: 1 October 2026
- Competitors: 17 from 9 nations

Medalists
gold medal	Balqees Abdulla	United Arab Emirates
silver medal	Alaonod Al-Harbi	United Arab Emirates
bronze medal	Zhibek Kulumbetova	Kazakhstan
bronze medal	Miyu Suzuki	Thailand

The women's jiu-jitsu (ne-waza) 48 kilograms Ju-jitsu competition at the 2026 Asian Games in Nagoya was held on 1 October 2026 at Aichi Budokan.

== Schedule ==
All times are Japan Standard Time (UTC+09:00)

Date	Time	Event
Thursday, 1 October 2026	11:20	Elimination round of 32
Thursday, 1 October 2026	11:25	Elimination round of 16
Thursday, 1 October 2026	12:05	Quarterfinals
Thursday, 1 October 2026	12:25	Semifinals
Thursday, 1 October 2026	12:35	Repechage
Thursday, 1 October 2026	16:00	Contests for bronze medals
Thursday, 1 October 2026	16:10	Final

== Results ==
Legend

- SU — Won by submission (50–0)
- ADV — Won by advantages
- PNT — Won by penalties
- DSQ — Won by disqualification

=== Main bracket ===
==== Final ====
Final
Alaonod Al-Harbi (UAE)	0
Balqees Abdulla (UAE)	50^{SU}

==== Top half ====
Elimination round of 32
Mika Tanaka (JPN)	0
Jollirine Co (PHI)	50^{SU}

Elimination round of 16
Zhibek Kulumbetova (KAZ)	0^{ADV}
Jollirine Co (PHI)	0
Miyu Suzuki (THA)	2
Kim Na-hyun (KOR)	0
Hong Soo Jin (SGP)	11
Vương Trần Hoài Thương (VIE)	0
Batbayaryn Odgerel (MGL)	0
Alaonod Al-Harbi (UAE)	10

Quarterfinals
Zhibek Kulumbetova (KAZ)	50^{SU}
Miyu Suzuki (THA)	0
Hong Soo Jin (SGP)	0
Alaonod Al-Harbi (UAE)	50^{SU}

Semifinals
Zhibek Kulumbetova (KAZ)	0
Alaonod Al-Harbi (UAE)	7

==== Bottom half ====
Elimination round of 32

Elimination round of 16
Balqees Abdulla (UAE)	0^{ADV}
Kimberly Anne Custodio (PHI)	0
Pechrada Tan (THA)	0
Jung Hui-won (KOR)	7
Lim Chang Lin Kayleigh (SGP)	0
Phùng Thị Huệ (VIE)	0^{ADV}
Jivamedmaani Odsuren (MGL)	0^{DSQ}
Raikhan Abdullayeva (KAZ)	0

Quarterfinals
Balqees Abdulla (UAE)	0^{ADV}
Jung Hui-won (KOR)	0
Phùng Thị Huệ (VIE)	10
Jivamedmaani Odsuren (MGL)	0

Semifinals
Balqees Abdulla (UAE)	4
Phùng Thị Huệ (VIE)	2

=== Repechage ===
Repechage round 1
Miyu Suzuki (THA)	0^{ADV}
Hong Soo Jin (SGP)	0
Jung Hui-won (KOR)	8
Jivamedmaani Odsuren (MGL)	0

Contests for bronze medals
Miyu Suzuki (THA)	6
Phùng Thị Huệ (VIE)	4
Jung Hui-won (KOR)	2
Zhibek Kulumbetova (KAZ)	2^{ADV}
