= Jordan at the 2026 Asian Games =

- IOC code: JOR
- NOC: Jordan Olympic Committee

in Aichi–Nagoya, Japan September 19 – October 4, 2026
- Competitors: 73 in 16 sports
- Medals Ranked 23rd: Gold 2 Silver 3 Bronze 6 Total 11

Asian Games appearances (overview)
- 1986; 1990; 1994; 1998; 2002; 2006; 2010; 2014; 2018; 2022; 2026

Jordan is scheduled to compete at the 2026 Asian Games in Aichi Prefecture and Nagoya, Japan from September 19 to October 4, 2026.

== Competitors ==
The following is a list of the number of competitors representing Jordan that will participate at the Asian Games:

| Sport | Men | Women | Total |
|---|---|---|---|
| Basketball | 12 | 0 | 12 |
| Boxing | 4 | 2 | 6 |
| Cycling | 0 | 1 | 1 |
| Equestrian | 3 | 0 | 3 |
| Esports | 13 | 0 | 13 |
| Fencing | 2 | 1 | 3 |
| Gymnastics | 1 | 0 | 1 |
| Ju-jitsu | 8 | 1 | 9 |
| Karate | 3 | 3 | 6 |
| Mixed martial arts | 3 | 0 | 3 |
| Sport climbing | 1 | 1 | 2 |
| Squash | 1 | 0 | 1 |
| Taewondo | 4 | 3 | 7 |
| Tennis | 4 | 0 | 4 |
| Triathlon | 0 | 1 | 1 |
| Weightlifting | 1 | 0 | 1 |
| Total | 60 | 12 | 72 |

== Basketball ==
Summary

| Team | Event | Group Stage | | | | Quarterfinals | Semifinals | Final / BM | |
| Team | Event | Opposition Score | Opposition Score | Opposition Score | Rank | Opposition Score | Opposition Score | Opposition Score | Rank |
|---|---|---|---|---|---|---|---|---|---|
| Jordan men's | Men's 5x5 tournament | Chinese Taipei; L 80–83 | Qatar; W 76–65 | Iran; L 68–81 | 3 Q | South Korea; L 80–114 | Did not advance | | 7 |

=== Men's 5x5 tournament ===
Team roster

- Abdullah Olajuwon
- Amin Abu Hawwas
- Dar Tucker
- Freddy Ibrahim
- Perrin Buford
- Ahmad Al-Hamarsheh
- Rawhi Kilani
- Yazan Al-Taweel
- Yousef Abu Wazaneh
- Mohammad Hussein
- Malek Kanaan
- Ahmad Al-Dwairi

Preliminary Rounds – Group B

| Pos | Team | Pld | W | L | PF | PA | PD | Pts | Qualification |
|---|---|---|---|---|---|---|---|---|---|
| 1 | Iran | 3 | 2 | 1 | 206 | 196 | +10 | 5 (Note: Iran 1–0 Chinese Taipei) | Quarterfinals |
| 2 | Chinese Taipei | 3 | 2 | 1 | 243 | 221 | +22 | 5 | Quarterfinals |
| 3 | Jordan | 3 | 1 | 2 | 224 | 229 | −5 | 4 (Note: Jordan 1–0 Qatar) | Quarterfinals |
| 4 | Qatar | 3 | 1 | 2 | 193 | 220 | −27 | 4 | |

Source: AsianGames2026.org
Notes:

10 September 2026
13:00

Report
Box score

| Jordan | 80–83 | Chinese Taipei |
Scoring by quarter: 13–17, 23–29, 19–14, 25–23
| Pts: Buford, Olajuwon 18; Rebs: Buford, Tucker 8 Asts: Ibrahim 6 | | Pts: Chen Y. 16; Rebs: Gilbeck 9 Asts: Chen Y. 5 |

Aichi International Arena, Nagoya
Referees: Glenn Cornelio (PHI), Lee Ji-youn (KOR), Abdullah Al-Hejaili (KSA)

12 September 2026
13:00

Report
Box score

| Qatar | 65–76 | Jordan |
Scoring by quarter: 14–19, 16–23, 19–22, 16–12
| Pts: Lewis 14; Rebs: Saad 6 Asts: Lewis 4 | | Pts: Buford 20; Rebs: Hussein 9 Asts: three players 5 |

Aichi International Arena, Nagoya
Attendance: 8,132
Referees: Rabah Noujaim (LIB), Yuen Chun Yip (HKG), Budi Marfan (INA)

13 September 2026
10:00

Report
Box score

| Iran | 81–68 | Jordan |
Scoring by quarter: 19–20, 17–16, 27–16, 18–16
| Pts: Jamshidi 30; Rebs: Kazemi, Sharifi 8 Asts: Jafari 6 | | Pts: Tucker 19; Rebs: Buford 8 Asts: Ibrahim 7 |

Aichi International Arena, Nagoya
Attendance: 8,202
Referees: Rabah Noujaim (LBN), Yuen Chun Yip (HKG), Glenn Cornelio (PHI)

Quarterfinals

16 September 2026
10:00

Report
Box score

| Jordan | 80–114 | South Korea |
Scoring by quarter: 8–28, 19–23, 24–34, 29–29
| Pts: Tucker 22; Rebs: Hussein 4 Asts: Ibrahim 6 | | Pts: Lee H. 28; Rebs: Lee H., Lee W. 9 Asts: Lee J. 6 |

Aichi International Arena, Nagoya
Attendance: 7,904
Referees: Yuen Chun Yip (HKG), Chuang Chih-chun (TPE), Abdullah Al-Hejaili (KSA)

== Boxing ==
Men

| Athlete | Event | Round of 32 | Round of 16 | Quarterfinals | Semifinals | Final | |
| Athlete | Event | Opposition Result | Opposition Result | Opposition Result | Opposition Result | Opposition Result | Rank |
|---|---|---|---|---|---|---|---|
| Huthaifa Eshish | 55 kg | Heuangthisouan (LAO); W RSC | Peng (TPE); W 4–1 | Yamaguchi (JPN); L 0–5 | Did not advance | | |
| Mohammad Abu Jajeh | 60 kg | Kinley (BHU); W 5–0 | Siwach (IND); L 1–4 | Did not advance | | | |
| Zeyad Ishaish | 70 kg | Bye | Issa (PLE); W 3–2 | Saidov (TJK); W 4–1 | Okazawa (JPN); W 3–0 | Sabyrkhan (KAZ); L 0–5 | 2nd place, silver medalist(s) |
| Hussein Ishaish | 80 kg | —N/a | Uulu (KGZ); W 3–0 | Wang (CHN); W 3–1 | Kim (KOR); L 0–5 | Did not advance | 3rd place, bronze medalist(s) |

Women

| Athlete | Event | Round of 32 | Round of 16 | Quarterfinals | Semifinals | Final | |
| Athlete | Event | Opposition Result | Opposition Result | Opposition Result | Opposition Result | Opposition Result | Rank |
|---|---|---|---|---|---|---|---|
| Hanan Nassar | 51 kg | Bye | An (PRK); L 0–5 | Did not advance | | | |
| Mays Alreem Abu Khadijah | 60 kg | —N/a | Petecio (PHI); L RSC | Did not advance | | | |

== Cycling ==
=== Road ===
| Athlete | Event | Time | Rank |
|---|---|---|---|
| Samah Khaled | Women's road race | | |

=== Track ===
Sprint

| Athlete | Event | Qualification | | Round 1 | Repechage 1 | Round 2 | Repechage 2 | Round 3 | Repechage 3 | Quarterfinals | Semifinals | Finals / BM | |
| Athlete | Event | Time Speed (km/h) | Rank | Opposition Time Speed (km/h) | Opposition Time Speed (km/h) | Opposition Time Speed (km/h) | Opposition Time Speed (km/h) | Opposition Time Speed (km/h) | Opposition Time Speed (km/h) | Opposition Time Speed (km/h) | Opposition Time Speed (km/h) | Opposition Time Speed (km/h) | Rank |
|---|---|---|---|---|---|---|---|---|---|---|---|---|---|
| Samah Khaled | Women's sprint | | | – | – | | | | | | | | |

Omnium

| Athlete | Event | Scratch race | | Tempo race | | Elimination race | | Points race | | Total | |
| Athlete | Event | Points | Rank | Points | Rank | Points | Rank | Points | Rank | Points | Rank |
|---|---|---|---|---|---|---|---|---|---|---|---|
| Samah Khaled | Women's omnium | | | | | | | | | | |

== Equestrian ==
=== Eventing ===
| Athlete | Horse | Event | Dressage | | Cross-country | | | Jumping | | | | | | Total | |
| Athlete | Horse | Event | Dressage | | Cross-country | | | Qualifier | | | Final | | | Total | |
| Athlete | Horse | Event | Penalties | Rank | Penalties | Total | Rank | Penalties | Total | Rank | Penalties | Total | Rank | Penalties | Rank |
|---|---|---|---|---|---|---|---|---|---|---|---|---|---|---|---|
| Faris Shalan | | Individual | | | | | | | | | | | | | |

Qualification Legend: Q = Qualified for the final; q = Qualified for the final as a lucky loser

=== Jumping ===
| Athlete | Horse | Event | Qualification | | | Final | | |
| Athlete | Horse | Event | Penalties | Time | Rank | Penalties | Time | Rank |
|---|---|---|---|---|---|---|---|---|
| Ibrahim Bisharat | | Individual jumping B | | | | | | |
| Raad Naser | | Individual jumping B | | | | | | |

Qualification Legend: Q = Qualified for the final; q = Qualified for the final as a lucky loser

== Esports ==
eFootball

| Gamer | Event | Group stage | | | | | | Rank | Quarter-final | Semi-final | Final | Rank |
| Gamer | Event | Opposition Score | Opposition Score | Opposition Score | Opposition Score | Opposition Score | Opposition Score | Rank | Opposition Score | Opposition Score | Opposition Score | Rank |
|---|---|---|---|---|---|---|---|---|---|---|---|---|
| Sief Addeen Dababneh; Wissam Al-Oweisat | eFootball | | | | | | | | | | | |

MLBB

| Gamer | Event | Group stage | | | Rank | Quarter-final | Semi-final | Final | Rank |
| Gamer | Event | Opposition Score | Opposition Score | Opposition Score | Rank | Opposition Score | Opposition Score | Opposition Score | Rank |
|---|---|---|---|---|---|---|---|---|---|
| Huthaifa Abu Abteh; Mahmoud Al-Ali; Mohammad Al-Wahdani; Moyad Abdallah; Tharaa Marzouk; Yazan Al-Sawaris | Mobile Legends: Bang Bang | | | | | | | | |

PUBG Mobile - Asian Games Version

| Athlete | Event | Final | Rank |
|---|---|---|---|
| Haitham Al-Masri; Laith Mheidat; Mohammad Al-Addasi; Omar Al-Deeb; Omar Seif | PUBG Mobile - Asian Games Version | | |

== Fencing ==
| Athlete | Event | Round of 64 | Round of 32 | Round of 16 | Quarterfinal | Semifinal | Final / BM | |
| Athlete | Event | Opposition Score | Opposition Score | Opposition Score | Opposition Score | Opposition Score | Opposition Score | Rank |
|---|---|---|---|---|---|---|---|---|
| Iyad Odeh | Men's épée | – | – | – | – | – | – | |
| Abdallah Tahla | Men's sabre | —N/a | – | – | – | – | – | |
| Dina Mansi | Women's épée | —N/a | – | – | – | – | – | |

== Gymnastics ==
=== Artistic ===
Men

| Athlete | Event | Qualification | | | | | | | | Final | | | | | | | |
| Athlete | Event | Apparatus | | | | | | Total | Rank | Apparatus | | | | | | Total | Rank |
| Athlete | Event | F | PH | R | V | PB | HB | Total | Rank | F | PH | R | V | PB | HB | Total | Rank |
|---|---|---|---|---|---|---|---|---|---|---|---|---|---|---|---|---|---|
| Ahmad Habeeb | All-around | | | | | | | | | | | | | | | | |

== Ju-jitsu ==
Men

| Athlete | Event | Round of 64 | Round of 32 | Round of 16 | Quarterfinals | Semifinals | Repechage | Final / BM | |
| Athlete | Event | Opposition Result | Opposition Result | Opposition Result | Opposition Result | Opposition Result | Opposition Result | Opposition Result | Rank |
|---|---|---|---|---|---|---|---|---|---|
| Mahmoud Ghul | –69 kg | – | – | – | – | – | – | – | |
| Mohammad Omet | –69 kg | – | – | – | – | – | – | – | |
| Alaaldin Al-Kuzai | –77 kg | —N/a | – | – | – | – | – | – | |
| Mahmoud Jabr | –77 kg | —N/a | – | – | – | – | – | – | |
| Osama Nabas | –85 kg | —N/a | – | – | – | – | – | – | |
| Yousef Abu Al-Ragheb | –85 kg | —N/a | – | – | – | – | – | – | |
| Fawaz Haddadin | –94 kg | —N/a | – | – | – | – | – | – | |
| Yanal Qardan | –94 kg | —N/a | – | – | – | – | – | – | |

Women

| Athlete | Event | Round of 32 | Round of 16 | Quarterfinals | Semifinals | Repechage | Final / BM | |
| Athlete | Event | Opposition Result | Opposition Result | Opposition Result | Opposition Result | Opposition Result | Opposition Result | Rank |
|---|---|---|---|---|---|---|---|---|
| Maya Ishakat | –63 kg | – | – | – | – | – | – | |

== Karate ==
Men

| Athlete | Event | Round of 32 | Round of 16 | Quarterfinals | Semifinals | Repechage | Final / BM | |
| Athlete | Event | Opposition Result | Opposition Result | Opposition Result | Opposition Result | Opposition Result | Opposition Result | Rank |
|---|---|---|---|---|---|---|---|---|
| Abdallah Hammad | –60 kg | Hashimoto (JPN); L 3–6 | Did not advance | | | | | |
| Abdelrahman Al-Masatfa | –67 kg | Bye | Akylbek Uulu (KGZ); W 0–0 | Altynbek (KAZ); W 8–7 | Rashidov (UZB); L 0–8 | —N/a | Daifallah (PLE); W 4–0 | 3rd place, bronze medalist(s) |
| Mohammad Al-Jafari | –84 kg | —N/a | | Chung M-y (TPE); W 4–1 | Bhatt (IND); W 8–0 | —N/a | Asiabari (IRI); W 9–1 | 1st place, gold medalist(s) |

Women

| Athlete | Event | Round of 16 | Quarterfinals | Semifinals | Repechage | Final / BM | |
| Athlete | Event | Opposition Result | Opposition Result | Opposition Result | Opposition Result | Opposition Result | Rank |
|---|---|---|---|---|---|---|---|
| Nourallah Naser | –61 kg | Bye | Vann (CAM); L 0–6 | Did not advance | | | |
| Joud Aldrous | –68 kg | —N/a | Faiad (KSA); W 4–0 | Wong CL (HKG); W 4–0 | —N/a | Li Qq (CHN); L 3–4 | 2nd place, silver medalist(s) |
| Yara Naser | +68 kg | —N/a | Gurung (NEP); L 1–7 | Did not advance | | | |

== Mixed martial arts ==
| Athlete | Event | Preliminary | Quarterfinal | Semifinal | Final | |
| Athlete | Event | Opposition Result | Opposition Result | Opposition Result | Opposition Result | Rank |
|---|---|---|---|---|---|---|
| Marwan Nassar | Men's modern −71 kg | Bye | Khurshedzoda (TJK); L 0–3 | Did not advance | | |
| Ra'ad Al-Najjar | Men's traditional −77 kg | Bye | Uulu (KGZ); L 0–3 | Did not advance | | |

== Sport climbing ==
Speed

| Athlete | Event | Qualification | | | | | | Quarterfinals | | Semifinals | | Final | |
| Athlete | Event | Lane A | Lane B | Lane C | Lane D | Time | Rank | Time | Rank | Time | Rank | Time | Rank |
|---|---|---|---|---|---|---|---|---|---|---|---|---|---|
| Omar Abu Hamatto | Men's | 8.90 | 9.15 | 8.08 | Fall | 8.08 | 19 | Did not advance | | | | | |
| Jood Farkouh | Women's | 15.58 | 16.38 | 16.67 | 16.43 | 15.58 | 17 | Did not advance | | | | | |

== Squash ==
| Athlete | Event | Round of 64 | Round of 32 | Round of 16 | Quarterfinals | Semifinals | Final | |
| Athlete | Event | Opposition Result | Opposition Result | Opposition Result | Opposition Result | Opposition Result | Opposition Result | Rank |
|---|---|---|---|---|---|---|---|---|
| Osama Al-Bataineh | Men's singles | Bye | Leung (HKG); L 0–3 | Did not advance | | | | |

== Taekwondo ==
Men

| Athlete | Event | Round of 16 | Quarterfinals | Semifinals | Final | |
| Athlete | Event | Opposition Result | Opposition Result | Opposition Result | Opposition Result | Rank |
|---|---|---|---|---|---|---|
| Jafar Al-Daoud | –58 kg | – | – | – | – | |
| Zaid Kareem | –68 kg | – | – | – | – | |
| Saleh El-Sharabaty | –80 kg | – | – | – | – | |
| Anas Al-Adarbi | +80 kg | – | – | – | – | |

Women

| Athlete | Event | Round of 16 | Quarterfinals | Semifinals | Final | |
| Athlete | Event | Opposition Result | Opposition Result | Opposition Result | Opposition Result | Rank |
|---|---|---|---|---|---|---|
| Fadia Khirfan | –57 kg | – | – | – | – | |
| Razan Al-Rawashdeh | –67 kg | – | – | – | – | |
| Rama Abu Al-Rub | +67 kg | – | – | – | – | |

== Tennis ==
| Athlete | Event | Round of 64 | Round of 32 | Round of 16 | Quarterfinals | Semifinals | Final | |
| Athlete | Event | Opposition Score | Opposition Score | Opposition Score | Opposition Score | Opposition Score | Opposition Score | Rank |
|---|---|---|---|---|---|---|---|---|
| Zaid Al-Mashni | Men's singles | Murtaza (PAK); W 2–0 | Wong (HKG); L 0–2 | Did not advance | | | | |
| Mohammad Alkotop | Men's singles | Bye | Hsu (TPE); L 1–2 | Did not advance | | | | |
| Mohammad Alkotop; Zaid Al-Mashni | Men's doubles | —N/a | Kurniawan / Trismuwantara (INA); L 0–2 | Did not advance | | | | |

== Triathlon ==
| Athlete | Event | Time | | | | | | Rank |
| Athlete | Event | Swim (0.75 km) | Trans 1 | Bike (20 km) | Trans 2 | Run (5 km) | Total | Rank |
|---|---|---|---|---|---|---|---|---|
| Lydia Musleh | Women's individual | 10:05 | 0:41 | 32:11 | 0:24 | 20:18 | 1:03:39 | 16 |

== Weightlifting ==
| Athlete | Event | Snatch | | Clean & Jerk | | Total | Rank |
| Athlete | Event | Result | Rank | Result | Rank | Total | Rank |
|---|---|---|---|---|---|---|---|
| Asem Alsallaj | Men's −110 kg | 161 | 9 | — | — | — | — |
