= 2026 Asian Games medal table =

- Location: Aichi Prefecture and Nagoya, Japan

Highlights
- Most gold medals: China 169
- Most total medals: China 341
- Medalling NOCs: 40

The 2026 Asian Games, officially known as the XX Asian Games or Aichi–Nagoya 2026, was the largest sporting event in Asia governed by Olympic Council of Asia (OCA). They were held from 19 September to 4 October 2026 in Aichi Prefecture and Nagoya, Japan, with 469 events in 43 sports and disciplines featured in the Games.

== Medal table ==
The ranking in this table is consistent with International Olympic Committee convention in its published medal tables. By default, the table is ordered by the number of gold medals the athletes from a nation have won (in this context, a "nation" is an entity represented by an NOC). The number of silver medals is taken into consideration next and then the number of bronze medals. If nations are still tied, equal ranking is given and they are listed alphabetically by IOC country code.

* Host nation (Japan)

2026 Asian Games medal table
Rank	Nation	Gold	Silver	Bronze	Total
1	China	169	89	83	341
2	Japan*	83	95	91	269
3	South Korea	39	43	68	150
4	India	21	27	37	85
5	Uzbekistan	21	25	24	70
6	Iran	19	18	15	52
7	Thailand	18	13	21	52
8	Kazakhstan	12	24	48	84
9	Hong Kong	11	19	24	54
10	Bahrain	11	5	6	22
11	Malaysia	9	7	16	32
12	North Korea	7	13	9	29
13	United Arab Emirates	7	5	1	13
14	Qatar	6	6	6	18
15	Chinese Taipei	5	17	33	55
16	Indonesia	5	11	23	39
17	Philippines	4	9	16	29
18	Saudi Arabia	4	3	10	17
19	Kuwait	4	1	4	9
20	Vietnam	3	3	19	25
21	Singapore	2	9	7	18
22	Tajikistan	2	5	9	16
23	Jordan	2	3	6	11
24	Myanmar	2	1	2	5
25	Macau	1	4	1	6
26	Kyrgyzstan	1	3	10	14
27	Mongolia	1	1	13	15
28	Sri Lanka	1	1	1	3
29	Pakistan	0	2	8	10
30	Iraq	0	2	3	5
31	Turkmenistan	0	2	0	2
32	Afghanistan	0	1	2	3
32	Lebanon	0	1	2	3
34	Oman	0	1	1	2
35	Cambodia	0	0	4	4
36	Nepal	0	0	2	2
37	Bangladesh	0	0	1	1
37	Brunei	0	0	1	1
37	Laos	0	0	1	1
37	Syria	0	0	1	1
Totals (40 entries)		470	469	629	1,568

== NOCs without medal ==
- Asian Refugee Team
- Bhutan
- Maldives
- Palestine
- Timor-Leste
- Yemen

== See also ==
- 2026 Asian Para Games medal table
