= Karate at the 2026 Asian Games – Men's kumite 84 kg =

Men's kumite 84 kg at the 2026 Asian Games
- Venue: Toyohashi City General Gymnasium
- Date: 22 September 2026
- Competitors: 6 from 6 nations

Medalists
gold medal	Mohammad Al-Jafari	Jordan
silver medal	Ali Asghar Asiabari	Iran
bronze medal	Chung Meng-yu	Chinese Taipei
bronze medal	Abdulla Babikr	Qatar

The men's kumite 84 kilograms competition at the 2026 Asian Games took place on 22 September 2026 at Toyohashi City General Gymnasium, Toyohashi. Mohammad Al-Jafari defeated Iran's Ali Asghar Asiabari in the final to give Jordan its first gold medal of the Games

== Schedule ==
All times are Japan Standard Time (UTC+09:00)

Date	Time	Event
Tuesday, 22 September 2026	10:50	Quarterfinals
Tuesday, 22 September 2026	10:50	Semifinals
Tuesday, 22 September 2026	10:50	Bronze medal bouts
Tuesday, 22 September 2026	16:10	Final

== Results ==
Legend

- H — Won by hansoku

=== Main bracket ===
Quarterfinals
Chung Meng-yu (TPE)	1
Mohammad Al-Jafari (JOR)	4
Abdulla Babikr (QAT)	1
Ali Asghar Asiabari (IRI)	4

Semifinals
Mohammad Al-Jafari (JOR)	8
Chetan Bhatt (IND)	0
Ali Asghar Asiabari (IRI)	0^{H}
Abdallah Al-Khatib (PLE)	3

Final
Mohammad Al-Jafari (JOR)	9
Ali Asghar Asiabari (IRI)	1

=== Repechage ===
Bronze medal bouts
Chung Meng-yu (TPE)	1
Chetan Bhatt (IND)	1
Abdulla Babikr (QAT)	8
Abdallah Al-Khatib (PLE)	0
