= Tenzing Sherpa =

Nepalese karateka

Personal information
- Nationality: Nepalese

Sport
- Sport: Karate
- Weight class: +84 kg
- Event: Kumite
- Club: Boudha Dojo
Medal record
Representing Nepal
Men's karate
Asian Games
Bronze medal – third place	2026 Aichi-Nagoya	+84 kg

Tenzing Sherpa is a Nepalese karateka who competes in men's kumite in the +84 kg weight category. He won a bronze medal in the event at the 2026 Asian Games in Aichi-Nagoya, Japan.

== Career ==
Sherpa began practising karate at Boudha Dojo in Kathmandu in 2017. He competed in the men's +84 kg kumite category at the Asian Karate Championships, including the 2025 championship in Tashkent and the 2026 championship in Bali.

In 2026, Sherpa won gold in the +84 kg category at the South Asian Karate Championship in Dhaka.

=== 2026 Asian Games ===
At the 2026 Asian Games, Sherpa competed in the men's +84 kg kumite event. He defeated Macau's On Tek Leong in the quarterfinal before losing 5–0 to Iran's Mahmoud Nemati in the semifinal.

In the bronze-medal bout, Sherpa defeated Laos's Vatthana Xayasan 9–1 to win the bronze medal.

The medal was Nepal's first at the 2026 Asian Games.
