= Karate at the 2026 Asian Games – Men's kumite +84 kg =

Men's kumite +84 kg at the 2026 Asian Games
- Venue: Toyohashi City General Gymnasium
- Date: 23 September 2026
- Competitors: 8 from 8 nations

Medalists
gold medal	Mahmoud Nemati	Iran
silver medal	Sanad Sufyani	Saudi Arabia
bronze medal	Teerawat Kangtong	Thailand
bronze medal	Tenzing Sherpa	Nepal

The men's kumite +84 kilograms competition at the 2026 Asian Games took place on 23 September 2026 at Toyohashi City General Gymnasium, Toyohashi. Mahmoud Nemati defeated Saudi Arabia's Sanad Sufyani in the final to win the gold medal.

== Schedule ==
All times are Japan Standard Time (UTC+09:00)

Date	Time	Event
Wednesday, 23 September 2026	13:25	Quarterfinals
Wednesday, 23 September 2026	13:25	Semifinals
Wednesday, 23 September 2026	13:25	Bronze medal bouts
Wednesday, 23 September 2026	14:35	Final

== Results ==
Legend

- H — Won by hansoku

=== Main bracket ===
Quarterfinals		Semifinals		Final
Daniel Hutapea (INA)	5
Sreang Virak (CAM)	0	Daniel Hutapea (INA)	2
Teerawat Kangtong (THA)	0	Sanad Sufyani (KSA)	8
Sanad Sufyani (KSA)	5			Sanad Sufyani (KSA)	3
Vatthana Xayasan (LAO)	0			Mahmoud Nemati (IRI)	6
Mahmoud Nemati (IRI)	5	Mahmoud Nemati (IRI)	5
Leong On Tek (MAC)	1	Tenzing Sherpa (NEP)	0
Tenzing Sherpa (NEP)	0^{H}

=== Repechage ===
Bronze medal bouts
Teerawat Kangtong (THA)	6
Daniel Hutapea (INA)	3
Vatthana Xayasan (LAO)	1
Tenzing Sherpa (NEP)	9
