= Karate at the 2026 Asian Games – Women's kumite 68 kg =

Women's kumite 68 kg at the 2026 Asian Games
- Venue: Toyohashi City General Gymnasium
- Date: 21 September 2026
- Competitors: 8 from 8 nations

Medalists
gold medal	Li Qiaoqiao	China
silver medal	Joud Al-Drous	Jordan
bronze medal	Nguyễn Thị Diệu Ly	Vietnam
bronze medal	Wong Cheuk Lee	Hong Kong

The women's kumite 68 kilograms competition at the 2026 Asian Games took place on 21 September 2026 at Toyohashi City General Gymnasium, Toyohashi. Li Qiaoqiao of China defeated Jordan's Joud Al-Drous 4–3 in the final to win the gold medal.

== Schedule ==
All times are Japan Standard Time (UTC+09:00)

Date	Time	Event
Monday, 21 September 2026	16:05	Quarterfinals
Monday, 21 September 2026	16:05	Semifinals
Monday, 21 September 2026	16:05	Bronze medal bouts
Monday, 21 September 2026	17:35	Final

== Results ==
=== Main bracket ===
Quarterfinals		Semifinals		Final
Tsubasa Kama (JPN)	2
Atousa Golshadnejad (IRI)	0	Tsubasa Kama (JPN)	4
Li Qiaoqiao (CHN)	4	Li Qiaoqiao (CHN)	7
Nguyễn Thị Diệu Ly (VIE)	1			Li Qiaoqiao (CHN)	4
Wong Cheuk Lee (HKG)	3			Joud Al-Drous (JOR)	3
Nirupa Dong Tamang (NEP)	0	Wong Cheuk Lee (HKG)	0
Rana Faiad (KSA)	0	Joud Al-Drous (JOR)	4
Joud Al-Drous (JOR)	4

=== Repechage ===
Bronze medal bouts
Nguyễn Thị Diệu Ly (VIE)	4
Tsubasa Kama (JPN)	4
Rana Faiad (KSA)	0
Wong Cheuk Lee (HKG)	1
