= Marcelo Yarad =

Chilean sports shooter

Marcelo Yarad (born October 4, 1969) is a Chilean sport shooter. He competed at the 2000 Summer Olympics in the men's skeet event, in which he tied for ninth place.
