= Jorge Antonio Salhe =

Chilean-Palestinian sports shooter and engineer

Personal information
- Nickname: Coke
- Nationality: Chilean; Palestinian
- Born: Jorge Antonio Salhe Readi; 1 July 1975 (age 51) Santiago, Chile
- Education: Pontifical Catholic University of Chile
- Occupations: Sports shooter; engineer

Sport
- Country: Palestine
- Sport: Shooting
- Event: Skeet

Jorge Antonio Salhe Readi (Spanish: [ˈxoɾxe anˈtonjo ˈsalxe reˈaði]; Arabic: جورج أنطونيو الصالحي, romanized: Jūrj Anṭūniyū aṣ-Ṣāliḥiyy; born 24 August 1974) is a Chilean-Palestinian shooter and engineer. He represented Palestine in the men's skeet event at the 2024 Summer Olympics, coming on last out of 30 competitors.

== Early and personal life ==
Salhe was born in Chile to Palestinian immigrants Jorge Sr. and Deniz Salhe. His mother was born in Bethlehem, Mandatory Palestine, arriving in Santiago when she was four years old as her family was searching for better opportunities. Salhe grew up in a household where the roots and history of Palestine were valued.

He studied industriale civil engineering and mechanical engineering at the Pontifical Catholic University of Chile. From a young age, he showed interest in shooting sports. He began practicing skeet at local clubs in Santiago and quickly excelled in national competitions. He was trained by Peruvian Olympic shooter Juan Giha.

Salhe is in a relationship with a woman named Sylvia. He has seven children: Pamela, Claudia, Francisco, Gonzalo, Nicolás, Agustina and Gaspar.

== Career ==
Salhe has participated in international events, representing both Chile and Palestine on various occasions. For more than five years, Salhe and other Chilean-Palestinians worked to incorporate Palestine into the International Shooting Sport Federation (ISSF), gathering support from different countries, especially from other Arab federations.

=== Olympic participation ===
Salhe was invited by the ISSF to participate in the 2024 Summer Olympics in Paris, France, representing Palestine; this invitation was one of the universality places allocated to athletes from underrepresented countries to participate, promoting diversity in the Olympic Games.

He participated in the men's skeet event, being the first Palestinian to compete in shooting events at the Olympics. He came last in the qualification round out of 30 competitors, failing to advance.
