= Chetan Bhatt =

Indian karate practitioner

Personal information
- National team: India
- Born: Haldwani, Uttarakhand,India

Sport
- Country: India
- Sport: Karate
- Weight class: 84 kg
- Event: Kumite

Chetan Bhatt is an Indian karate practitioner who competes in the men's 84 kg kumite category. He represented India at the 2026 Asian Games in Aichi-Nagoya, Japan.Bhatt is from Haldwani, Uttarakhand, India. He is an MBA student at Graphic Era (Deemed to be University). He won the gold medal in the Senior 84 kg Kumite category at the 10th South Asian Karate Championship in Bangladesh before representing India at the 2026 Asian Games.

Bhatt is from Haldwani, Uttarakhand, India. He is an MBA student at Graphic Era (Deemed to be University). He won the gold medal in the Senior 84 kg Kumite category at the 10th South Asian Karate Championship in Bangladesh before representing India at the 2026 Asian Games.

== 2026 Asian Games ==
Bhatt was selected as one of India's two karate competitors at the 2026 Asian Games, alongside Alisha Choudhary, who competed in the women's 55 kg kumite category. In the men's 84 kg kumite competition, Bhatt reached the semi-final, where he lost 8–0 to Jordan's Mohammad Al-Jafari. He subsequently competed in the bronze-medal bout against Chinese Taipei's Meng-yu Chung. The bout ended 1–1, with Chung winning on the Senshu tie-break rule after scoring first. As a result, Bhatt finished outside the medal positions after reaching the bronze medal bout.
