= Karate at the 2026 Asian Games – Men's kumite 60 kg =

Men's kumite 60 kg at the 2026 Asian Games
- Venue: Toyohashi City General Gymnasium
- Date: 20 September 2026
- Competitors: 18 from 18 nations

Medalists
gold medal	Abdullah Shaaban	Kuwait
silver medal	Abdelrahman Abdelhamid	Qatar
bronze medal	Saud Al-Basher	Saudi Arabia
bronze medal	Sureeya Sankar	Malaysia

The men's kumite 60 kilograms competition at the 2026 Asian Games took place on 20 September 2026 at Toyohashi City General Gymnasium, Toyohashi.

== Schedule ==
All times are Japan Standard Time (UTC+09:00)

Date	Time	Event
Sunday, 20 September 2026	12:50	Round of 32
Sunday, 20 September 2026	12:50	Round of 16
Sunday, 20 September 2026	12:50	Quarterfinals
Sunday, 20 September 2026	12:50	Semifinals
Sunday, 20 September 2026	12:50	Repechage
Sunday, 20 September 2026	12:50	Bronze medal bouts
Sunday, 20 September 2026	16:40	Final

== Results ==
=== Main bracket ===
==== Final ====
Final
Abdullah Shaaban (KUW)	8
Abdelrahman Abdelhamid (QAT)	0

==== Top half ====
Round of 32
Abdallah Hammad (JOR)	3
Hiromu Hashimoto (JPN)	6

Round of 16
Hiromu Hashimoto (JPN)	0
Muhammad Mirzozoda (TJK)	3
Min Bahadur Tamang (NEP)	4
Chau Ka Him (HKG)	1
Abdullah Shaaban (KUW)	0
Bekzhan Kalykov (KGZ)	0
Siwakon Muekthong (THA)	5
Saud Al-Basher (KSA)	5

Quarterfinals
Muhammad Mirzozoda (TJK)	0
Min Bahadur Tamang (NEP)	2
Abdullah Shaaban (KUW)	11
Saud Al-Basher (KSA)	8

Semifinals
Min Bahadur Tamang (NEP)	0
Abdullah Shaaban (KUW)	10

==== Bottom half ====
Round of 32
Park Geon-ho (KOR)	1
John Christian Lachica (PHI)	2

Round of 16
John Christian Lachica (PHI)	1
Raýan Gurbanmyradow (TKM)	6
Sureeya Sankar (MAS)	5
Siam Hosen (BAN)	0
Battöriin Daramzagd (MGL)	0
Chu Văn Đức (VIE)	6
Mekhriddin Turakhonov (UZB)	1
Abdelrahman Abdelhamid (QAT)	4

Quarterfinals
Raýan Gurbanmyradow (TKM)	2
Sureeya Sankar (MAS)	3
Chu Văn Đức (VIE)	4
Abdelrahman Abdelhamid (QAT)	10

Semifinals
Sureeya Sankar (MAS)	1
Abdelrahman Abdelhamid (QAT)	7

=== Repechage ===
Repechage round 2
Bekzhan Kalykov (KGZ)	2
Saud Al-Basher (KSA)	10
Mekhriddin Turakhonov (UZB)	3
Chu Văn Đức (VIE)	3

Bronze medal bouts
Saud Al-Basher (KSA)	2
Min Bahadur Tamang (NEP)	0
Chu Văn Đức (VIE)	2
Sureeya Sankar (MAS)	10
