= Saudi Arabia at the 2026 Asian Games =

- IOC code: KSA
- NOC: Saudi Olympic and Paralympic Committee

in Aichi–Nagoya, Japan September 19 – October 4, 2026
- Competitors: 138 in 18 sports
- Flag bearers: Khalifah Al-Omairi and Yara Al-Omari
- Medals Ranked 18th: Gold 4 Silver 3 Bronze 10 Total 17

Asian Games appearances (overview)
- 1978; 1982; 1986; 1990; 1994; 1998; 2002; 2006; 2010; 2014; 2018; 2022; 2026

Saudi Arabia is competing at the 2026 Asian Games in Aichi and Nagoya, Japan, from September 19 to October 4, 2026.

== Competitors ==
The following is a list of the number of competitors representing Saudi Arabia at the Asian Games:

Sport	Men	Women	Total
Swimming	7	0	7
Athletics	16	3	19
Basketball	12	0	12
Boxing	1	1	2
Ju-jitsu	9	0	9
Mixed martial arts	2	1	3
Equestrian	5	1	6
Esports	18	0	18
Fencing	8	0	8
Football	23	0	23
Judo	1	0	1
Karate	3	3	6
Padel	0	4	4
Shooting	7	0	7
Squash	1	0	1
Taekwondo	3	3	6
Weightlifting	3	0	3
Wrestling	3	0	3
Total	122	16	138

== Medalists ==
Medal	Name	Sport	Event	Date
Silver	Sanad Sufyani	Karate	Men's kumite +84 kg	September 23
Silver	Naif Alfaleh	Esports	Gran Turismo 7	September 23
Bronze	Dina Mustafa	Karate	Women's kumite +68 kg	September 20
Bronze	Saud Al-Basher	Karate	Men's kumite −60 kg	September 20

== Basketball ==
Summary

Team	Event	Group Stage				Quarterfinals	Semifinals	Final / BM	
Team	Event	Opposition Score	Opposition Score	Opposition Score	Rank	Opposition Score	Opposition Score	Opposition Score	Rank
Saudi Arabia men's	Men's 5x5 tournament	South Korea; L 66–82	Japan; L 80–86	Indonesia; W 100–89	3 Q	China; L 78–87	Did not advance		8

=== Men's 5x5 tournament ===
Team roster

- Osama Al-Bargawi
- Marzouq Al-Muwallad
- Muhammad-Ali Abdur-Rahkman
- Mathna Al-Marwani
- Mohammed Al-Sager
- Khalid Abdel Gabar
- Mohammed Al-Suwailem
- Ahmed Al-Mukhtar
- Ali Shubayli
- Thamer Mohammed
- Mohammed Al-Khater
- Hammam Hussain

Preliminary Rounds – Group A

Pos	Team	Pld	W	L	PF	PA	PD	Pts	Qualification
1	South Korea	3	3	0	284	197	+87	6	Quarterfinals
2	Japan (H)	3	2	1	267	233	+34	5	Quarterfinals
3	Saudi Arabia	3	1	2	246	257	−11	4	Quarterfinals
4	Indonesia	3	0	3	190	300	−110	3	

Source: AsianGames2026.org
(H) Hosts

10 September 2026
16:00

Report
Box score

South Korea	82–66	Saudi Arabia
Scoring by quarter: 24–17, 17–11, 33–19, 8–19
Pts: Lee H. 23; Rebs: Lee J. 7 Asts: Byeon, Lee J. 4		Pts: Al-Muwallad 18; Rebs: Al-Marwani, Al-Suwailem 9 Asts: Al-Marwani 5

Aichi International Arena, Nagoya
Referees: Wissam Zein (SYR), Chuang Chih-chun (TPE), Hu Jing (CHN)

11 September 2026
19:00

Report
Box score

Saudi Arabia	80–86	Japan
Scoring by quarter: 15–25, 20–26, 20–17, 25–18
Pts: Abdur-Rahkman 29; Rebs: Al-Suwailem 12; Asts: Al-Marwani 5		Pts: Kirk 23; Rebs: Kirk 10; Asts: Kurokawa 8

Aichi International Arena, Nagoya
Attendance: 9,177
Referees: Glenn Cornelio (PHI), Yuen Chun Yip (HKG), Nattapong Jontapa (THA)

13 September 2026
16:00

Report
Box score

Saudi Arabia	100–89	Indonesia
Scoring by quarter: 21–21, 29–20, 20–14, 30–34
Pts: Abdur-Rahkman 41; Rebs: Al-Suwailem 13; Asts: Abdel Gabar 7		Pts: Grahita 22; Rebs: Kosasih 12; Asts: Saputera 8

Aichi International Arena, Nagoya
Attendance: 8,435
Referees: Chuang Chih-Chun (TPE), Hu Jing (CHN), Rakesh Ramalingaiah (IND)

Quarterfinals

16 September 2026
16:00

Report
Box score

China	87–78	Saudi Arabia
Scoring by quarter: 27–24, 21–15, 14–23, 25–16
Pts: Liao 30; Rebs: Cui, Yu 9 Asts: Liao 4		Pts: Abdur-Rahkman 25; Rebs: Al-Suwailem 10; Asts: three players 4

Aichi International Arena, Nagoya
Attendance: 5,504
Referees: Mohammad Taha (JOR), Nattapong Jontapa (THA), Lee Ji-youn (KOR)

== Boxing ==
=== Men ===
Athlete	Event	Round of 32	Round of 16	Quarterfinal	Semifinal	Final
Ziyad Majrashi	Men's 60 kg	(North Korea) O Tae Bom; L 0–5	Did not advance			

=== Women ===
Athlete	Event	Round of 16	Quarterfinal	Semifinal	Final
Yara Al-Omari	Women's 51 kg	(South Korea) Bak Chorong; L 0–5	Did not advance		

== Esports ==
=== Gran Turismo 7 ===
Athlete	Final points	Rank
Naif Alfaleh	25	2

=== eFootball ===
Players	Group stage	Quarterfinal
Amjad Al-Qarni; Abdulaziz Al-Juhani	(Qatar) W 2–0 (South Korea) W 2–0 (Iran) L 0–2	(Iran) L 0–1

== Fencing ==
=== Men's sabre ===
Athlete	Pool	Round of 32	Round of 16	Rank
Adel Almutairi	2–3	(Philippines) W 15–9	(South Korea) L 9–15	17–24
Fayadh Alobaid	1–4	Did not advance		27

== Football ==
Summary

Key:

- A.E.T – After extra time.
- P – Match decided by penalty shoot-out.

Team	Event	Group Stage			Quarterfinals	Semifinals	Final / BM	
Team	Event	Opposition Score	Opposition Score	Rank	Opposition Score	Opposition Score	Opposition Score	Rank
Saudi Arabia men's under-23	Men's tournament	Qatar; W 2–0	South Korea; L 0–2	2 Q	Uzbekistan; L 0–3	Did not advance		6

=== Men's tournament ===
Preliminary Rounds – Group D

Pos	Team	Pld	W	D	L	GF	GA	GD	Pts	Qualification
1	South Korea	2	2	0	0	6	1	+5	6	Advance to knockout stage
2	Saudi Arabia	2	1	0	1	2	2	0	3	Advance to knockout stage
3	Qatar	2	0	0	2	1	6	−5	0	

Source: Aichi–Nagoya 26
18 September 2026
19:30

Saudi Arabia	2–0	Qatar
Barnawi 38'; Houssa 47'	Report

Paloma Mizuho Rugby Stadium, Nagoya
Attendance: 1,214
Referee: Sultan Al-Hammadi (United Arab Emirates)

22 September 2026
19:00

South Korea	2–0	Saudi Arabia
Shin Min-ha 67'; Kim Myung-jun 69'	Report

Paloma Mizuho Rugby Stadium, Nagoya
Attendance: 1,042
Referee: Hiroki Kasahara (Japan)

Quarterfinals

25 September 2026
14:00

Uzbekistan	3–0	Saudi Arabia
Murtazaev 12'; Tulkenbekov 79'; Abdurakhmonov 86'	Report

Paloma Mizuho Rugby Stadium, Nagoya
Attendance: 1,308
Referee: Tuan Yaasin (Malaysia)

== Karate ==
Men

Athlete	Event	Round of 16	Quarterfinals	Semifinals	Repechage	Final / BM	
Athlete	Event	Opposition Result	Opposition Result	Opposition Result	Opposition Result	Opposition Result	Rank
Saud Al-Basher	–60 kg	Mueakthong (THA); W 5–5	Shaaban (KUW); L 8–11	Did not advance	Kalykov (KGZ); W 10–2	Tamang (NEP); W 2–0	3rd place, bronze medalist(s)
Mohammed Al-Asiri	–67 kg	Sainbayaryn (MGL); W 8–0	Kozaki (JPN); L 0–0	Did not advance	Khuất (VIE); L 3–7	Did not advance	
Sanad Sufyani	+84 kg	—N/a	Kangtong (THA); W 5–0	Hutapea (INA); W 8–2	—N/a	Nemati (IRI); L 3–6	2nd place, silver medalist(s)

=== Women ===
Athlete	Event	Round of 16	Quarterfinals	Semifinals	Repechage	Final / BM	
Athlete	Event	Opposition Result	Opposition Result	Opposition Result	Opposition Result	Opposition Result	Rank
Joud Myajan	–50 kg	Chinzorig (MGL); W 6–1	Alimardanova (UZB); L 1–10	Did not advance			
Rana Faiad	–68 kg	—N/a	Aldrous (JOR); L 0–4	Did not advance	—N/a	Wong CL (HKG); L 0–1	5
Dina Mustafa	+68 kg	—N/a	Berultseva (KAZ); L 6–9	Did not advance	—N/a	Gurung (NEP); W 8–7	3rd place, bronze medalist(s)

== Mixed martial arts ==
=== Men ===
Athlete	Event	Quarterfinal
Malik Basahal	Men's −60 kg	(Kazakhstan) L 0–3
Saud Al-Mulhim	Men's −65 kg	(Philippines) L 0–3

== Shooting ==
=== Men ===
Athlete	Event	Qualification	Result
Saeid Almutairi	Men's skeet	112/125	Did not advance
Saud Alhassan	Men's skeet	111/125	Did not advance
Fahad Alharbi	Men's skeet	106/125	Did not advance

== Squash ==
=== Men's singles ===
Athlete	Round of 32	Round of 16
Mohammed Al-Nasfan	(China) Peng Lin Zhou; W 3–0	(Pakistan) Muhammad Irfan; September 24

== Swimming ==
=== Men ===
Athlete	Event	Heats	Final	Rank
Emad Zaben	Men's 100 m freestyle	49.81	Withdrew from swim-off	—
Zaid Al-Sarraj	Men's 100 m freestyle	50.49	Did not advance	—
Ali Al-Issa	Men's 100 m backstroke	57.35	Did not advance	—
Emad Zaben	Men's 50 m freestyle	22.24	22.11	6
Rami Al-Rahmouni	Men's 1500 m freestyle	—	14:55.32	4

== Wrestling ==
Saudi Arabia entered three male wrestlers.

Key:

- VT (ranking points: 5–0 or 0–5) – Victory by fall.
- VB (ranking points: 5–0 or 0–5) – Victory by injury (VF for forfeit, VA for withdrawal or disqualification)
- PP (ranking points: 3–1 or 1–3) – Decision by points – the loser with technical points.
- PO (ranking points: 3–0 or 0–3) – Decision by points – the loser without technical points.
- ST (ranking points: 4–0 or 0–4) – Great superiority – the loser without technical points and a margin of victory of at least 8 (Greco-Roman) or 10 (freestyle) points.
- SP (ranking points: 4–1 or 1–4) – Technical superiority – the loser with technical points and a margin of victory of at least 8 (Greco-Roman) or 10 (freestyle) points.

Freestyle

Athlete	Event	Qualifications	Round of 16	Quarterfinal	Semifinal	Repechage	Final / BM	
Athlete	Event	Opposition Result	Opposition Result	Opposition Result	Opposition Result	Opposition Result	Opposition Result	Rank
Abdullatif Albakri	Men's −65 kg	Bye	Sattar (BAN); W 10–0 ^{ST}	Kudiev (TJK); L 0–11 ^{ST}	Did not advance	Kuular (KAZ); L 0–4 ^{VT}	Did not advance	

Greco-Roman

Athlete	Event	Round of 16	Quarterfinal	Semifinal	Repechage	Final / BM	
Athlete	Event	Opposition Result	Opposition Result	Opposition Result	Opposition Result	Opposition Result	Rank
Munthir Jandu	Men's −67 kg	Abdulloev (TJK); W 8–1 ^{PP}	Khalmakhanov (UZB); L 0–8 ^{ST}	Did not advance	Leng (CHN); L 0–3 ^{PO}	Did not advance	
Ibrahim Fallatah	Men's −97 kg	Bali (IRI); L 0–7 ^{PO}	Did not advance				
