= United Arab Emirates at the 2026 Asian Games =

- IOC code: UAE
- NOC: United Arab Emirates National Olympic Committee

in Aichi–Nagoya, Japan September 19 – October 4, 2026
- Competitors: 153 in 21 sports
- Medals Ranked 13th: Gold 7 Silver 5 Bronze 1 Total 13

Asian Games appearances (overview)
- 1978; 1982; 1986; 1990; 1994; 1998; 2002; 2006; 2010; 2014; 2018; 2022; 2026

United Arab Emirates competed at the 2026 Asian Games in Aichi Prefecture and Nagoya, Japan from September 19 to October 4, 2026. The country won 13 medals (7 gold, 5 silver and 1 bronze), ranking 13th in the medal total.

== Competitors ==
The following is a list of the number of competitors representing United Arab Emirates that participated at the Asian Games:

Sport	Men	Women	Total
Archery	4	6	10
Athletics	3	2	5
Cycling	6	2	8
Equestrian	5	3	8
Esports	13	0	13
Fencing	6	2	8
Football	23	0	23
Golf	3	3	6
Judo	5	0	5
Ju-jitsu	10	6	16
Karate	0	3	3
Modern pentathlon	1	0	1
Padel	4	4	8
Rowing	1	0	1
Rugby sevens	12	0	12
Sailing	1	2	3
Shooting	8	6	14
Swimming	6	0	6
Taewondo	0	1	1
Triathlon	2	0	2
Weightlifting	0	2	2
Total	111	42	153

== Football ==
Summary

Key:

- A.E.T – After extra time.
- P – Match decided by penalty-shootout.

Team	Event	Group Stage				Quarterfinals	Semifinals	Final / BM	
Team	Event	Opposition Score	Opposition Score	Opposition Score	Rank	Opposition Score	Opposition Score	Opposition Score	Rank
United Arab Emirates men's under-23	Men's tournament	Iran; L 1–3	North Korea; D 0–0	China; D 0–0	4th	Did not advance			13

=== Men's tournament ===
Team squads

United Arab Emirates announced their final squad on 12 September.

Head coach: (Croatia) Igor Bišćan

No.	Pos.	Player	Date of birth (age)	Caps	Goals	Club
1	GK	Saeed Maqdami	21 August 2004 (aged 22)	0	0	(United Arab Emirates Football Association) Al-Nasr
2	DF	Mubarak Zamah	29 November 2003 (aged 22)	10	0	(United Arab Emirates Football Association) Baniyas
3	DF	Leonard Amesimeku	25 November 2003 (aged 22)	3	0	(United Arab Emirates Football Association) Al Dhafra
4	DF	Khamis Al-Mansoori	15 January 2004 (aged 22)	13	1	(United Arab Emirates Football Association) Baniyas
5	DF	Mansour Al-Balushi	19 January 2005 (aged 21)	1	0	(United Arab Emirates Football Association) Al Ain
6	MF	Matar Zaal	2 March 2004 (aged 22)	9	0	(United Arab Emirates Football Association) Sharjah
7	MF	Saif Al-Kaabi	14 February 2005 (aged 21)	0	0	(United Arab Emirates Football Association) Sharjah
8	MF	Ali Abdulaziz	16 July 2003 (aged 23)	14	2	(United Arab Emirates Football Association) Al-Nasr
9	FW	Mohammad Juma	30 May 2006 (aged 20)	5	4	(United Arab Emirates Football Association) Shabab Al Ahli
10	FW	Yahya Al-Ghassani* (captain)	18 April 1998 (aged 28)	3	0	(United Arab Emirates Football Association) Shabab Al Ahli
11	FW	Ahmed Al-Shammari	19 April 2005 (aged 21)	0	0	(United Arab Emirates Football Association) Al-Nasr
12	DF	Bader Nasser*	16 September 2001 (aged 25)	0	0	(United Arab Emirates Football Association) Shabab Al Ahli
13	DF	Yousif Al-Marzooqi	7 March 2005 (aged 21)	0	0	(United Arab Emirates Football Association) Al Dhafra
14	DF	Solomon Sosu	5 March 2005 (aged 21)	10	1	(United Arab Emirates Football Association) Baniyas
15	DF	Mackenzie Hunt*	14 November 2001 (aged 24)	0	0	(United Arab Emirates Football Association) Baniyas
16	FW	Junior Ndiaye	29 March 2005 (aged 21)	10	6	(French Football Federation) Valenciennes
17	GK	Rashed Salem	20 November 2005 (aged 20)	0	0	(United Arab Emirates Football Association) United FC
18	DF	Mansour Burghash	12 November 2004 (aged 21)	6	0	(United Arab Emirates Football Association) Al Wahda
19	DF	Nahyan Al-Memari	23 September 2005 (aged 21)	0	0	(United Arab Emirates Football Association) Al Ain
20	FW	Mansoor Al-Menhali	29 March 2003 (aged 23)	15	7	(United Arab Emirates Football Association) Palm City
21	FW	Mayed Saeed	6 May 2003 (aged 23)	9	5	(United Arab Emirates Football Association) Sharjah
22	GK	Khaled Tawhid	16 February 2004 (aged 22)	8	0	(United Arab Emirates Football Association) Sharjah
23	FW	Hazem Mohammad	18 March 2005 (aged 21)	10	0	(United Arab Emirates Football Association) Al Ain

* Over-aged player.

Preliminary Rounds – Group B

Pos	Team	Pld	W	D	L	GF	GA	GD	Pts	Qualification
1	China	3	1	2	0	2	1	+1	5	Advance to knockout stage
2	North Korea	3	1	1	1	5	3	+2	4	Advance to knockout stage
3	Iran	3	1	1	1	4	5	−1	4	
4	United Arab Emirates	3	0	2	1	1	3	−2	2	

Source: Aichi–Nagoya 26
16 September 2026
14:00

United Arab Emirates	1–3	Iran
Hunt 57'	Report	Shahrabadi 49'; Ndiaye 52' (o.g.); Mazraeh 88'

Wave Stadium Kariya, Kariya
Attendance: 671
Referee: Sadullo Gulmurodi (Tajikistan)

20 September 2026
19:00

North Korea	0–0	United Arab Emirates
	Report

Wave Stadium Kariya, Kariya
Attendance: 1,139
Referee: Adam Kersey (Australia)

23 September 2026
14:30

China	0–0	United Arab Emirates
	Report

Toyota Stadium, Toyota
Attendance: 7,501
Referee: Ahmad A'Qashah (Singapore)

== Modern pentathlon ==
Athlete	Event		Fencing (épée one touch)			Fencing (Direct Elimination)		Obstacle run			Swimming (100 m freestyle)			Combined: shooting/running (10 m laser pistol)/(3000 m)			Total points	Final rank
Athlete	Event		V	D	Rank	Rank	MP Points	Time	Rank	MP points	Time	Rank	MP points	Time	Rank	MP points	Total points	Final rank
Abdulrahman Abdullah Mohammed	Men's individual	Semifinal	7	28	33	18	196	35.11	16	340	1:10.56	18	248	13:22.07	16	498	1282	17
Abdulrahman Abdullah Mohammed	Men's individual	Final	7	28	33	Did not advance												

== Shooting ==
Men

Athlete	Event	Qualification		Final	
Athlete	Event	Points	Rank	Points	Rank
Ahmed Al-Ameeri	10 m air pistol	566-12x	39	Did not advance	
Mohamad Saleh	10 m air pistol	559-10x	48	Did not advance	
Salem Al-Yammahi	10 m air rifle	611.8	42	Did not advance	
Sultan Hassan	10 m air rifle	595.2	46	Did not advance	
Mohammed Al-Maktoum	Trap	113	21	Did not advance	
Yahya Al-Mheiri	Trap	112	24	Did not advance	
Mohammed Ahmed	Skeet	113	23	Did not advance	
Saif Bin Futtais	Skeet	117	11	Did not advance	

Women

Athlete	Event	Qualification		Final	
Athlete	Event	Points	Rank	Points	Rank
Ghaya Al-Shuhail	10 m air pistol	555-9x	45	Did not advance	
Mahra Al-Suwaidi	10 m air pistol	544-2x	52	Did not advance	
Reem Al-Ketbi	10 m air pistol	DNS			
Fatima Al-Suwaidi	10 m air rifle	621.1	37	Did not advance	
Muna Al-Hosani	10 m air rifle	593.4	55	Did not advance	
Yasmin Tahlak	10 m air rifle	614.0	50	Did not advance	

Mixed team

Athlete	Event	Qualification		Final	
Athlete	Event	Points	Rank	Points	Rank
Ghaya Al-Shuhail; Mohamad Saleh	10 m air pistol	560-9x	18	Did not advance	
Fatima Al-Suwaidi; Salem Al-Yammahi	10 m air rifle	617.6	13	Did not advance	

== Triathlon ==
Athlete	Event	Time						Rank
Athlete	Event	Swim (0.75 km)	Trans 1	Bike (20 km)	Trans 2	Run (5 km)	Total	Rank
Yousuf Alhanaee	Men's individual	10:10	0:42	31:27	0:22	19:55	1:02:36	26
