= Mongolia at the 2026 Asian Games =

- IOC code: MGL
- NOC: Mongolian National Olympic Committee

in Aichi–Nagoya, Japan September 19 – October 4, 2026
- Competitors: 303 in 31 sports
- Flag bearers: Ch. Temuulen; P. Enkhkhuslen
- Medals Ranked 27th: Gold 1 Silver 1 Bronze 13 Total 15

Asian Games appearances (overview)
- 1974; 1978; 1982; 1986; 1990; 1994; 1998; 2002; 2006; 2010; 2014; 2018; 2022; 2026

Mongolia competed at the 2026 Asian Games in Nagoya, Aichi Prefecture, Japan, held from September 19 to October 4, 2026.

== Medalists ==
The following athlete from Mongolia won medal at the Games.

Medal	Name	Sport	Event	Date
Gold	Kazirbekiin Yolk	Judo	Men's 66 kg	30 September
Silver	Terbishiin Ariunzayaa	Judo	Women's 57 kg	1 October
Bronze	Sainbayaryn Jambaljamts	Cycling	Men's individual time trial	20 September

== Basketball ==
Summary

Athlete	Event	Group Stage				Quarterfinal	Semifinal	Final / BM	
Athlete	Event	Opposition Score	Opposition Score	Opposition Score	Rank	Opposition Score	Opposition Score	Opposition Score	Rank
Mongolia women	Women's tournament	Chinese Taipei; L 67–76	South Korea; L 61–88	Malaysia; W 89–81	3 Q	China; L 63–89	Did not advance		7

=== 5x5 tournament ===
==== Women's tournament ====
Team roster

- Bat-erdene Ariuntsetseg
- Battogtokh Unurzaya
- Murat Bulbul
- Bayarmaa Tsatsral
- Tsendjav Bolortsetseg
- Tuvshinjargal Ulemj
- Onolbaatar Khulan
- Baatar Bolor-erdene
- Battsooj Bolor-erdene
- Erdenebayan Narangoo
- Amari Robinson
- Baatar-erdene Anungoo

Preliminary Rounds – Group C

Pos	Team	Pld	W	L	PF	PA	PD	Pts	Qualification
1	South Korea	3	3	0	267	160	+107	6	Quarterfinals
2	Chinese Taipei	3	2	1	233	199	+34	5	Quarterfinals
3	Mongolia	3	1	2	217	245	−28	4	Quarterfinals
4	Malaysia	3	0	3	180	293	−113	3	

Source: aichi-nagoya2026.org

18 September 2026
13:00

Report

Chinese Taipei	76–67	Mongolia
Scoring by quarter: 23–19, 18–27, 18–10, 17–11
Pts: Peng S. 15; Rebs: Hsiao 11; Asts: Peng H. 6		Pts: Robinson 25; Rebs: Robinson 13; Asts: O. Khulan 3

Aichi International Arena, Nagoya
Attendance: 7,791
Referees: Shigeyuki Arisawa (JPN), Mahsa Kargari (IRI), Rakesh RamalingaiaH (IND)

21 September 2026
13:00

Report

Mongolia	61–88	South Korea
Scoring by quarter: 9–28, 10–23, 19–16, 23–21
Pts: Robinson 22; Rebs: Robinson 4 Asts: Bayarmaa, Onolbaatar 4		Pts: Lee H. 20; Rebs: Hong Y. 4 Asts: Heo Y. 8

Aichi International Arena, Nagoya
Attendance: 3,863
Referees: Hu Jing (CHN), Glenn Cornelio (PHI), Abdullah Al-Hejaili (KSA)

22 September 2026
19:00

Report

Mongolia	89–81	Malaysia
Scoring by quarter: 18–14, 28–26, 20–9, 23–32
Pts: O. Khulan 31; Rebs: O. Khulan 12; Asts: Bat-erdene 7		Pts: Yap 16; Rebs: Tan S. 7 Asts: Tan S. 8

Aichi International Arena, Nagoya
Attendance: 5,883
Referees: Yuen Chun Yip (HKG), Mohammad Taha (JOR), Nattapong Jontapa (THA)

Quarterfinals

24 September 2026
13:00

Report

China	89–63	Mongolia
Scoring by quarter: 24–23, 25–5, 20–15, 20–20
Pts: Yang 21; Rebs: Zhang Z. 9 Asts: three players 5		Pts: Robinson 18; Rebs: Bulbul 9 Asts: four players 3

Aichi International Arena, Nagoya
Attendance: 3,686
Referees: Rakesh Ramalingaiah (IND), Glenn Cornelio (PHI), Mandy Ngieng (MAS)

== Modern pentathlon ==
Athlete	Event		Fencing (épée one touch)			Fencing (Direct Elimination)		Obstacle run			Swimming (100 m freestyle)			Combined: shooting/running (10 m laser pistol)/(3000 m)			Total points	Final rank
Athlete	Event		V	D	Rank	Rank	MP Points	Time	Rank	MP points	Time	Rank	MP points	Time	Rank	MP points	Total points	Final rank
Bilegt Amarsanaa	Men's individual	Semifinal	10	25	31	18	196	36.37	13	336	56.00	4	320	13:05.06	14	515	1367	14
Bilegt Amarsanaa	Men's individual	Final	10	25	31	Did not advance												

== Karate ==
Men

Athlete	Event	Round of 16	Quarterfinals	Semifinals	Repechage	Final / BM	
Athlete	Event	Opposition Result	Opposition Result	Opposition Result	Opposition Result	Opposition Result	Rank
Badar-Uugan Möngölögdölgöönii	Individual kata	Bye	Hung (HKG); L 0–5	Did not advance			
Battör Daramzagd	–60 kg	Chu (VIE); L 0–6	Did not advance				
Sainbayaryn Davaajargal	–67 kg	Al-Assiri (KSA); L 0–8	Did not advance				

Women

Athlete	Event	Round of 16	Quarterfinals	Semifinals	Repechage	Final / BM	
Athlete	Event	Opposition Result	Opposition Result	Opposition Result	Opposition Result	Opposition Result	Rank
Yalalt Misheel	Individual kata	Chu OK (MAC); L 0–5	Did not advance				
Chinzorig Enkhazaya	–50 kg	Myajan (KSA); L 1–6	Did not advance				
Pürevjav Maraljingoogiin	–61 kg	Bye	Kanay (KAZ); L 1–9	Did not advance	Antora (BAN); L 0–8	Did not advance	

== Shooting ==
=== Men ===
Individual

Athlete	Event	Qualification		Final	
Athlete	Event	Points	Rank	Points	Rank
Enkhtaivan Badamgarav	10 m air pistol	561-9x	47	Did not advance	
Enkhtaivan Badamgarav	25 m rapid fire pistol	551-12x	25	Did not advance	
Enkhtaivany Davaakhüü	10 m air pistol	576-18x	16	Did not advance	
Enkhtaivany Davaakhüü	25 m rapid fire pistol	567-14x	19	Did not advance	
Shirgal Buyanzayaa	10 m air pistol	563-10x	45	Did not advance	
Shirgal Buyanzayaa	25 m rapid fire pistol	DSQ	—	Did not advance	
Batbayar Erkhembayar	10 m air rifle	625.5	19	Did not advance	
Batbayar Erkhembayar	50 m rifle 3 position	587-29x	6 Q	336.8	4
Enkhtüvshingiin Sainkhüü	10 m air rifle	615.1	39	Did not advance	
Enkhtüvshingiin Sainkhüü	50 m rifle 3 position	568-20x	33	Did not advance	
Nyantaigiin Bayaraa	10 m air rifle	629.5	8 Q	207.9	4
Nyantaigiin Bayaraa	50 m rifle 3 position	583-29x	12	Did not advance	

Team

Athlete	Event	Final	
Athlete	Event	Points	Rank
Enkhtaivan Badamgarav; Enkhtaivany Davaakhüü; Shirgal Buyanzayaa	10 m air pistol	1700-37x	12
Enkhtaivan Badamgarav; Enkhtaivany Davaakhüü; Shirgal Buyanzayaa	25 m rapid fire pistol	DSQ	—
Batbayar Erkhembayar; Enkhtüvshingiin Sainkhüü; Nyantaigiin Bayaraa	10 m air rifle	1870.1	9
Batbayar Erkhembayar; Enkhtüvshingiin Sainkhüü; Nyantaigiin Bayaraa	50 m rifle 3 position	1738-78x	6

=== Women ===
Individual

Athlete	Event	Qualification		Final	
Athlete	Event	Points	Rank	Points	Rank
Altankhuyagiin Buyandelger	10 m air pistol	562-13x	37	Did not advance	
Altankhuyagiin Buyandelger	25 m pistol	571-23x	23	Did not advance	
Amarbayasgalangiin Ariunzayaa	10 m air pistol	547-10x	50	Did not advance	
Tömörchödöriin Bayartsetseg	10 m air pistol	564-12x	35	Did not advance	
Tömörchödöriin Bayartsetseg	25 m pistol	576-17x	16	Did not advance	
Tömörchödöriin Bayarmaa	25 m pistol	569-18x	27	Did not advance	
Gankhuyag Nandinzayaa	10 m air rifle	627.4	20	Did not advance	
Gankhuyag Nandinzayaa	50 m rifle 3 position	581-26x	26	Did not advance	
Odonkhüü Mönkhzul	10 m air rifle	625.6	26	Did not advance	
Oyuunbatyn Yesügen	10 m air rifle	623.4	33	Did not advance	
Oyuunbatyn Yesügen	50 m rifle 3 position	586-30x	13	Did not advance	
Yanjinlkham Olzvoibaatar	50 m rifle 3 position	547-20x	37	Did not advance	

Team

Athlete	Event	Final	
Athlete	Event	Points	Rank
Altankhuyagiin Buyandelger; Amarbayasgalangiin Ariunzayaa; Tömörchödöriin Bayartsetseg	10 m air pistol	1673-35x	12
Altankhuyagiin Buyandelger; Tömörchödöriin Bayarmaa; Tömörchödöriin Bayartsetseg	25 m pistol	1716-58x	7
Gankhuyag Nandinzayaa; Odonkhüü Mönkhzul; Oyuunbatyn Yesügen	10 m air rifle	1876.4	9
Gankhuyag Nandinzayaa; Oyuunbatyn Yesügen; Yanjinlkham Olzvoibaatar	50 m rifle 3 position	1741-76x	9

=== Mixed ===
Team

Athlete	Event	Qualification		Final	
Athlete	Event	Points	Rank	Points	Rank
Enkhtaivany Davaakhüü; Tömörchödöriin Bayartsetseg	10 m air pistol	576-15x	9	Did not advance	
Batbayar Erkhembayar; Oyuunbatyn Yesügen	10 m air rifle	624.4	9	Did not advance	

== Soft tennis ==
Men

Athlete	Event	Group stage				Second Stage	Quarter-finals	Semi-finals	Final / BM	
Athlete	Event	Opposition Score	Opposition Score	Opposition Score	Rank	Opposition Score	Opposition Score	Opposition Score	Opposition Score	Rank
Bold-Erdene Altangerel	Singles	Chen (TPE); L 0–4	Thakur (IND); L 0–4	—N/a	3	Did not advance				
Munkhtulga Bataa	Singles	Kurosaka (JPN); L 1–4	Kim (KOR); L 0–4	Keavirak (CAM); L 2–4	4	Did not advance				
Bold-Erdene Altangerel; Bud Nyamdorj; Khaliunbayar Khurelbayar; Munkhtulga Bataa; Ulsbold Enkhbayar	Team	Chinese Taipei; L 0–3	Laos; L 1–2	India; L 0–3	4	—N/a	Did not advance			

Women

Athlete	Event	Group stage				Second Stage	Quarter-finals	Semi-finals	Final / BM	
Athlete	Event	Opposition Score	Opposition Score	Opposition Score	Rank	Opposition Score	Opposition Score	Opposition Score	Opposition Score	Rank
Anu-ujin Gantur	Singles	Ri (PRK); L 0–4	—N/a	—N/a	2	Did not advance				
Namuunkhuslen Erdembileg	Singles	Chaudhary (NEP); L 0–4	Temma (JPN); L 0–4	—N/a	3	Did not advance				
Anu-ujin Gantur; Enkhjin Amarjargal; Enkhkhuslen Ganbaatar; Khongorzul Ganbold; Namuunkhuslen Erdembileg	Team	Philippines; L 0–3	Chinese Taipei; L 0–3	Thailand; L 0–3	4	—N/a		Did not advance		

Mixed

Athlete	Event	Group stage				Second Stage	Quarter-finals	Semi-finals	Final / BM	
Athlete	Event	Opposition Score	Opposition Score	Opposition Score	Rank	Opposition Score	Opposition Score	Opposition Score	Opposition Score	Rank
Khaliunbayar Khurelbayar; Khongorzul Ganbold	Doubles	Bhandari / Chaudhary (NEP); L 4–5	Yu / Huang (TPE); L 0–5	—N/a	3	Did not advance				
Bud Nyamdorj; Enkhkhuslen Ganbaatar	Doubles	Kim / Park (KOR); L 0–5	Tiwari / Meena (IND); L 0–5	Chao / Khun (CAM); L 3–5	4	Did not advance				

== Table tennis ==
Men

Athlete	Event	Round of 64	Round of 32	Round of 16	Quarterfinal	Semifinal	Final / BM	
Athlete	Event	Opposition Result	Opposition Result	Opposition Result	Opposition Result	Opposition Result	Opposition Result	Rank
Bilguun Ankhbayar	Singles	Ridoy (BAN); W 4–2	Matsushima (JPN); L 0–4	Did not advance				
Temuulen Myandal	Singles	Iskandarov (UZB); L 2–4	Did not advance					
Bilguun Ankhbayar; Temuulen Myandal	Doubles	Al-Kuwari / Korani (QAT); L 1–3	Did not advance					
Enkhtamirbayasgalan Bodisuren; Enkhtuguldurbayasgalan	Doubles	Bye	Lin / Huang (CHN); L 0–3	Did not advance				

Women

Athlete	Event	Round of 64	Round of 32	Round of 16	Quarterfinal	Semifinal	Final / BM	
Athlete	Event	Opposition Result	Opposition Result	Opposition Result	Opposition Result	Opposition Result	Opposition Result	Rank
Batmönkhiin Bolor-Erdene	Singles	Sisomboun (LAO); W 4–0	Doo (HKG); L 1–4	Did not advance				
Burenjargal Sanjaa	Singles	Erkebaeva (UZB); L 1–4	Did not advance					
Ankhmaa Ser-Od; Bolor-egshiglen Batmunkh	Doubles	Bye	Loy / Ser (SGP); L 0–3	Did not advance				
Batmönkhiin Bolor-Erdene; Burenjargal Sanjaa	Doubles	Bye	Akula / Das (IND); L 0–3	Did not advance				

Mixed

Athlete	Event	Round of 64	Round of 32	Round of 16	Quarterfinal	Semifinal	Final / BM	
Athlete	Event	Opposition Result	Opposition Result	Opposition Result	Opposition Result	Opposition Result	Opposition Result	Rank
Ankhmaa Ser-Od; Bilguun Ankhbayar	Doubles	Kapali / Shrestha (NEP); W 3–1	Ahmed / Nazim (MDV); L 2–3	Did not advance				
Batmönkhiin Bolor-Erdene; Temuulen Myandal	Doubles	Zheng HW / Leong ON (MAC); L 0–3	Did not advance					

Team

Athlete	Event	Group stage			Round of 16	Quarterfinal	Semifinal	Final	
Athlete	Event	Opposition Score	Opposition Score	Rank	Opposition Score	Opposition Score	Opposition Score	Opposition Score	Rank
Bilguun Ankhbayar; Enkhtamirbayasgalan Bodisuren; Enkhtuguldurbayasgalan; Temuulen Myandal	Men's	South Korea; L 0–3	Yemen; W 3–1	2 Q	Chinese Taipei; L 0–3	Did not advance			
Ankhmaa Ser-Od; Batmönkhiin Bolor-Erdene; Bolor-egshiglen Batmunkh; Burenjargal Sanjaa	Women's	Japan; L 0–3	Uzbekistan; L 1–3	3	Did not advance				

== Teqball ==
Athlete	Event	Group stage					Quarterfinal	Semifinal	Repechage	Final / BM	
Athlete	Event	Opposition Score	Opposition Score	Opposition Score	Opposition Score	Rank	Opposition Score	Opposition Score	Opposition Score	Opposition Score	Rank
Chinguun Ganzorig	Men's singles	Aidarbekov (KGZ); L (10–12, 7–12)	Alelayawi (IRQ); L (1–12, 2–12)	Eidan (KUW); L (0–12, 3–12)	Saw (MYA); L (6–12, 1–12)	5	Did not advance				
Tsetsenberkh Nominchimeg; Chinguun Ganzorig	Men's doubles	Ahmad / Al-Qattan (KUW); L (3–12, 3–12)	Nodomi / Arai (JPN); L (1–12, 0–12)	—N/a		3	Did not advance				

== Triathlon ==
Individual

Athlete	Event	Time						Rank
Athlete	Event	Swim (0.75 km)	Trans 1	Bike (20 km)	Trans 2	Run (5 km)	Total	Rank
Amarsanaa Ganbaatar	Men	11:55	0:47	Lapped				
Nomuunaa Ganbaatar	Women	10:46	1:08	DNF				
Tsog Ayas	Women	13:20	1:06	Lapped				

== Volleyball ==
=== Beach ===
Athletes	Event	Preliminary round				Round of 16	Quarterfinal	Semifinal	Final / BM	
Athletes	Event	Opposition Score	Opposition Score	Opposition Score	Rank	Opposition Score	Opposition Score	Opposition Score	Opposition Score	Rank
Amar Batmunkh; Shijir-erdene Bat-enkh	Men's	Buytrago / Rosales (PHI); L 0–2 (11–21, 15–21)	Efendi / Akbar (INA); L 0–2 (8–21, 6–21)	Nguyễn / Trần (VIE); L 0–2 (13–21, 13–21)	4	Did not advance				
Anudari Erdenesukh; Khatanzaya Purevjargal	Women's	N Matsumoto / R Matsumoto (JPN); L 0–2 (6–21, 7–21)	Nguyễn / Châu (VIE); L 0–2 (9–21, 7–21)	—N/a	3	Did not advance				
Khandsuren Gantogtokh; Tsolmon Batjargal	Women's	To WT / To WM (HKG); L 0–2 (7–21, 3–21)	Progella / Pagara (PHI); L 0–2 (3–21, 3–21)	Fathimath / Aminath (MDV); L 0–2 (14–21, 15–21)	4	Did not advance				

=== Indoor ===
Summary

Team	Event	Group stage				Quarterfinal / 9th-14th classification	Semifinal / 9th-12th classification	Final / BM	
Team	Event	Opposition Score	Opposition Score	Opposition Score	Rank	Opposition Score	Opposition Score	Opposition Score	Rank
Mongolia women's	Women's tournament	Thailand; L 0–3	Chinese Taipei; L 0–3	Kyrgyzstan; W 3–0	3 C	—N/a	Philippines; L 0–3	Nepal; W 3–0	11

==== Women's tournament ====
Team roster

- Enkhkhuslen Purevsuren (11)
- Erdene-enkh Otgonsuren (6)
- Khulan Bayarbayasgalan (29)
- Munkhzul Udval (7)
- Sanchirmaa Munguntsooj (16)
- Khaliunzaya Battogoo (19)
- Saruulgerel Ganbaatar (17)
- Temuulen Sansarbold (8)
- Amarbayasgalan Batbold (21)
- Enkhnaran Ganbold (4)
- Nergui Khosbayar (2)
- Ninjbolor Battur (15)

Group play

Pos	Team	Pld	W	L	Pts	SW	SL	SR	SPW	SPL	SPR	Qualification
1	Thailand	3	3	0	9	9	0	MAX	225	139	1.619	Quarterfinals
2	Chinese Taipei	3	2	1	6	6	3	2.000	214	157	1.363	Quarterfinals
3	Mongolia	3	1	2	3	3	6	0.500	167	198	0.843	Classification 9th–12th
4	Kyrgyzstan	3	0	3	0	0	9	0.000	113	225	0.502	Classification 9th–14th

Source: asiangames2026.org
Rules for classification: Tiebreakers

== Wushu ==
=== Sanda ===
Men

Athlete	Event	Round of 32	Round of 16	Quarter-finals	Semi-finals	Final	
Athlete	Event	Opposition Score	Opposition Score	Opposition Score	Opposition Score	Opposition Score	Rank
Enkhtuvshin Erdenebayar	–56 kg	—N/a	Saidov (TJK); W 2–0	–	–	–	
Mendbayar Bayadaa	–60 kg	—N/a	Tang SS (CHN); L 0–2	Did not advance			
Javkhlan Uurtsaikh	–65 kg	Makhamadjonov (UZB); L 0–2	Did not advance				
Tsatsral Narantsetseg	–75 kg	—N/a	Turgunbaev (UZB); L WPD	Did not advance			

Women

Athlete	Event	Round of 16	Quarter-finals	Semi-finals	Final	
Athlete	Event	Opposition Score	Opposition Score	Opposition Score	Opposition Score	Rank
Davaajargal Purevjav	–52 kg	Ngô (VIE); L WPD	Did not advance			
Michidmaa Lkhagva	–60 kg	Azatova (UZB); L WPD	Did not advance			
