= Taekwondo at the 2026 Asian Games – Individual virtual =

Virtual Taekwondo competition

Individual virtual at the 2026 Asian Games
- Venue: Toyohashi City General Gymnasium
- Date: 2 October 2026
- Competitors: 16 from 15 nations

Medalists
gold medal	Jeus Yape	Philippines
silver medal	Châu Ngọc Tuyết Sang	Vietnam
bronze medal	Darren Yap	Singapore
bronze medal	Rita Bakisheva	Kazakhstan

The Virtual Taekwondo (VTKD) event at the 2026 Asian Games took place on 2 October 2026 at the Toyohashi City General Gymnasium in Toyohashi, Aichi, Japan.

Virtual Taekwondo, a virtual reality game based on traditional taekwondo debuted in this edition of the continental games. It was previously featured in the 2023 Olympic Esports Week in Singapore, and had its first ever world championships in the same country the following year.

There was no weight class or gender restrictions in VTKD. Fourteen out of 16 competitors were also entered in either the men's or women's individual poomsae or kyorugi events. Japan's two athletes were the only individuals who aren't entered in a second event.

Although VTKD is a VR game, its competition was grouped with the taekwondo event rather than as part of the esports competition for the purpose of the games calendar.

Each bout consisted of up to three rounds, in virtual taekwondo each player starts a round with 1000 Health Points (HP). As a player registers more successful hits, their opponents' HP decreases. Once the HP turns 0, it results the opponent to win the round.

== Schedule ==
All times are Japan Standard Time (UTC+09:00)

Date	Time	Event
Friday, 2 October 2026	09:00	Round of 16
Friday, 2 October 2026	09:00	Quarterfinals
Friday, 2 October 2026	09:00	Semifinals
Friday, 2 October 2026	09:00	Gold medal contest

== Results ==
Round of 16
Lkhagvyn Badam (MGL)	40	0
Sasikarn Tongchan (THA)	340	140
An Hyang-sik (KOR)	0	180	0
Châu Ngọc Tuyết Sang (VIE)	240	0	400
Jasurbek Jaysunov (UZB)	460	20
Amir Sina Bakhtiari (IRI)	560	260
Alisher Asymbek Uulu (KGZ)	0	0
Darren Yap (SGP)	660	360
Mohammad Al-Adarbi (JOR)	0	200
Rita Bakisheva (KAZ)	460	720
Lam Siu Wai (HKG)	500	0
Kashish Malik (IND)	800	400
Dunya Saber (KSA)	80	640	260
Jeus Yape (PHI)	360	160	560
Hayate Suzuki (JPN)	480	740	540
Miho Nakajima (JPN)	480	0	500

Quarterfinals
Sasikarn Tongchan (THA)	0	0
Châu Ngọc Tuyết Sang (VIE)	620	560
Amir Sina Bakhtiari (IRI)	0	20
Darren Yap (SGP)	80	580
Rita Bakisheva (KAZ)	0	460	340
Kashish Malik (IND)	320	0	0
Jeus Yape (PHI)	560	360
Hayate Suzuki (JPN)	0	0

Semifinals
Châu Ngọc Tuyết Sang (VIE)	640	800
Darren Yap (SGP)	0	0
Rita Bakisheva (KAZ)	0	240
Jeus Yape (PHI)	640	400

Gold medal contest
Châu Ngọc Tuyết Sang (VIE)	0	0
Jeus Yape (PHI)	500	620
