= Taekwondo at the 2026 Asian Games =

- Venue: Toyohashi City General Gymnasium
- Dates: 1–3 October 2026
- Competitors: 153 from 35 nations

Taekwondo at the 2026 Asian Games was held between 1 and 3 October 2026 at Toyohashi City General Gymnasium.

The discipline of Virtual Taekwondo made its Asian Games debut. The virtual reality version of the martial arts which is endorsed by World Taekwondo, sees fighters wear virtual reality headsets and full-body motion tracking sensors to battle opponents as digital avatars within a virtual arena.

== Schedule ==
P	Preliminary rounds	F	Semifinals & Final

Event↓/Date →	1st Thu		2nd Fri		3rd Sat	
Men's poomsae	P	F				
Men's 58 kg			P	F		
Men's 68 kg					P	F
Men's 80 kg			P	F		
Men's +80 kg					P	F
Women's poomsae	P	F				
Women's 49 kg			P	F		
Women's 57 kg					P	F
Women's 67 kg			P	F		
Women's +67 kg					P	F
Virtual			P	F		

== Medalists ==
=== Men ===
Event	Gold	Silver	Bronze
Poomsae	Yun Kyu-sung; South Korea	Navin Pinthasute; Thailand	Jeus Yape; Philippines
Poomsae	Yun Kyu-sung; South Korea	Navin Pinthasute; Thailand	Darren Yap; Singapore
58 kg	Tamirlan Tleules; Kazakhstan	Kurt Bryan Barbosa; Philippines	Jaafar Al-Daoud; Jordan
58 kg	Tamirlan Tleules; Kazakhstan	Kurt Bryan Barbosa; Philippines	An Hyang-sik; South Korea
68 kg	Banlung Tubtimdang; Thailand	Mehdi Haji Mousaei; Iran	Zaid Kareem; Jordan
68 kg	Banlung Tubtimdang; Thailand	Mehdi Haji Mousaei; Iran	Mun Jin-ho; South Korea
80 kg	Jasurbek Jaysunov; Uzbekistan	Hung Jiun-yi; Chinese Taipei	Saleh El-Sharabaty; Jordan
80 kg	Jasurbek Jaysunov; Uzbekistan	Hung Jiun-yi; Chinese Taipei	Batyrkhan Toleugali; Kazakhstan
+80 kg	Arian Salimi; Iran	Marat Mavlonov; Uzbekistan	Mohammad Al-Adarbi; Jordan
+80 kg	Arian Salimi; Iran	Marat Mavlonov; Uzbekistan	Kang Sang-hyun; South Korea

=== Women ===
Event	Gold	Silver	Bronze
Poomsae	Jung Ha-eun; South Korea	Juliana Candelaria; Philippines	Thitaree Kaewolanwasu; Thailand
Poomsae	Jung Ha-eun; South Korea	Juliana Candelaria; Philippines	Yuiko Niwa; Japan
49 kg	Ma Jingyue; China	Tachiana Mangin; Philippines	Ruka Okamoto; Japan
49 kg	Ma Jingyue; China	Tachiana Mangin; Philippines	Patcharakan Poolkerd; Thailand
57 kg	Fadia Khirfan; Jordan	Zhang Chuling; China	Natkamon Wassana; Thailand
57 kg	Fadia Khirfan; Jordan	Zhang Chuling; China	Lin Wei-chun; Chinese Taipei
67 kg	Saghar Moradi; Iran	Ozoda Sobirjonova; Uzbekistan	Wang Wei-chia; Chinese Taipei
67 kg	Saghar Moradi; Iran	Ozoda Sobirjonova; Uzbekistan	Kwak Min-ju; South Korea
+67 kg	Song Da-bin; South Korea	Mu Wenzhe; China	Svetlana Saidova; Uzbekistan
+67 kg	Song Da-bin; South Korea	Mu Wenzhe; China	Fatemeh Ahmadi; Iran

=== Mixed ===
Event	Gold	Silver	Bronze
Virtual	Jeus Yape; Philippines	Châu Ngọc Tuyết Sang; Vietnam	Darren Yap; Singapore
Virtual	Jeus Yape; Philippines	Châu Ngọc Tuyết Sang; Vietnam	Rita Bakisheva; Kazakhstan

== Medal table ==
Rank	Nation	Gold	Silver	Bronze	Total
1	South Korea (KOR)	3	0	4	7
2	Iran (IRI)	2	1	1	4
3	Philippines (PHI)	1	3	1	5
4	Uzbekistan (UZB)	1	2	1	4
5	China (CHN)	1	2	0	3
6	Thailand (THA)	1	1	3	5
7	Jordan (JOR)	1	0	4	5
8	Kazakhstan (KAZ)	1	0	2	3
9	Chinese Taipei (TPE)	0	1	2	3
10	Vietnam (VIE)	0	1	0	1
11	Japan (JPN)	0	0	2	2
11	Singapore (SGP)	0	0	2	2
Totals (12 entries)		11	11	22	44

== Qualification ==
A total of maximum 160 athletes, 16 in each of the events could qualify to compete at the games. The top seven athletes in each category at the 2026 Asian Taekwondo Championships qualified. The host country (Japan) was guaranteed a spot in each event. A further 10 wildcards (one in each event) were awarded.

== Participating nations ==
A total of 153 athletes from 35 nations competed in taekwondo at the 2026 Asian Games:

- Afghanistan (2)
- Asian Refugee Team (2)
- Bahrain (2)
- Bhutan (1)
- Cambodia (2)
- China (8)
- Chinese Taipei (9)
- Hong Kong (6)
- India (3)
- Indonesia (3)
- Iran (10)
- Japan (10)
- Jordan (7)
- Kazakhstan (8)
- Kyrgyzstan (3)
- Lebanon (1)
- Macau (2)
- Malaysia (4)
- Mongolia (6)
- Nepal (3)
- Oman (1)
- Pakistan (4)
- Palestine (1)
- Philippines (7)
- Qatar (2)
- Saudi Arabia (4)
- Singapore (2)
- South Korea (10)
- Sri Lanka (1)
- Tajikistan (2)
- Thailand (10)
- Timor-Leste (1)
- United Arab Emirates (1)
- Uzbekistan (7)
- Vietnam (8)
