= Philippines at the 2026 Asian Games =

- IOC code: PHI
- NOC: Philippine Olympic Committee
- Website: www.olympic.ph (in English)

in Aichi–Nagoya, Japan 19 September – 4 October 2026
- Competitors: 452 in 39 sports
- Flag bearers (opening): Aira Villegas (boxing); Albert Delos Santos (weightlifting)
- Flag bearer (closing): Jeus Yape (taekwondo)
- Medals Ranked 17th: Gold 4 Silver 9 Bronze 16 Total 29

Asian Games appearances (overview)
- 1951; 1954; 1958; 1962; 1966; 1970; 1974; 1978; 1982; 1986; 1990; 1994; 1998; 2002; 2006; 2010; 2014; 2018; 2022; 2026

The Philippines competed at the 2026 Asian Games in the Aichi Prefecture and Nagoya, Japan. The games were scheduled to be held from 19 September to 4 October 2026, but the Philippines started their campaign on 11 September in basketball ahead of the opening ceremony.

== Background ==
=== Delegation ===
Philippine delegation at the opening ceremony.

At the general assembly of the Philippine Olympic Committee (POC) on 15 January 2025, Al Panlilio was named as the chef de mission of the Philippine delegation to the 2026 Asian Games. Panlilio later resigned on 6 July 2026 and was replaced by Richard Lim three days later.

The Philippine delegation consists of 464 athletes competing in 39 sports. Boxer Aira Villegas and weightlifter Albert Delos Santos were selected as flagbearers for the opening ceremony.

=== Medal targets ===
The POC is targeting to surpass its performance at the 2022 Asian Games in Hangzhou, China where it won four gold, two silver, and 12 bronze medals. Meanwhile, Patrick Gregorio the chairman of the state-run Philippine Sports Commission (PSC) targets the surpass the four medal haul of the Philippine delegation in the 2018 and 2022 Asian Games. Shortly prior to the games, the POC and PSC has set a target of eight gold medals with half of them expected to come from combat sports.

== Medalists ==
The following Philippine competitors won medals at the Games.

=== Gold ===
No.	Medal	Name	Sport	Event	Date
1	Gold	Carlos Yulo	Gymnastics	Men's floor	24 September
2	Gold	Carlos Yulo	Gymnastics	Men's vault	25 September
3	Gold	EJ Obiena	Athletics	Men's pole vault	29 September
4	Gold	Jeus Yape	Taekwondo	Mixed virtual taekwondo	2 October

=== Silver ===
No.	Medal	Name	Sport	Event	Date
1	Silver	Jean Claude Saclag	Mixed martial arts	Men's traditional 65 kg	22 September
2	Silver	Kacey dela Rosa; Amyah Espanol; Kennan Ka; Maria Victoria Pasilang	3x3 basketball	Women's tournament	25 September
3	Silver	Nelly Jay Salon; Abegail Sinogbuhan; Jean Marie Sucalit	Sepak takraw	Women's doubles	29 September
4	Silver	Amaya Cojuangco	Archery	Women's individual compound	1 October
5	Silver	Juliana Candelaria	Taekwondo	Women's individual poomsae	1 October
6	Silver	Carlo Paalam	Boxing	Men's 55 kg	2 October
7	Silver	Tachiana Mangin	Taekwondo	Women's –49 kg	2 October
8	Silver	Kurt Bryan Barbosa	Taekwondo	Men's –58 kg	2 October
9	Silver	Alex Enriquez	Ju-jitsu	Women's –63 kg	3 October

=== Bronze ===
No.	Medal	Name	Sport	Event	Date
1	Bronze	Princess Catindig; Bien Zoleta; Hilary Paas; Shyryn Salazar; Christy Sañosa	Soft tennis	Women's team	20 September
2	Bronze	Carlos Alvarez	Mixed martial arts	Men's traditional 77 kg	21 September
3	Bronze	Ysabielle Arrogante; Ricca Torres-Foronda; Sam Vegullas	Karate	Women's team kata	22 September
4	Bronze	Marie June Adriano	Karate	Women's kumite 50 kg	23 September
5	Bronze	Eldrew Yulo	Gymnastics	Men's horizontal bar	25 September
6	Bronze	Albert Delos Santos	Weightlifting	Men's 70 kg	26 September
7	Bronze	Rence Gatmaitan; David Lance; Ducke Leoncio; Robert Mempin; Michael Ocio; Kim Rey Salazar	Esports	Pokémon Unite	27 September
8	Bronze	John Cabang	Athletics	Men's 110 metres hurdles	27 September
9	Bronze	Dragon Dajao; Golden Dajao; Charles Esguerra; Chammy Nazarrea; Justine Tan; Jhon Tungol	Esports	Honor of Kings	28 September
10	Bronze	Reynaldo Asilum Jr. Ronsited Gabayeron; Jason Huerte; Glindel Phori; Jom Lerry Rafael	Sepak takraw	Men's regu	28 September
11	Bronze	Jayuard Alciso	Surfing	Men's shortboard	29 September
12	Bronze	Victoria Bossong	Athletics	Women's 800 metres	29 September
13	Bronze	Alexandra Eala	Tennis	Women's singles	1 October
14	Bronze	Jeus Yape	Taekwondo	Men's individual poomsae	1 October
15	Bronze	Sofiah Pagara; Khylem Progella	Beach Volleyball	Women's tournament	2 October
16	Bronze	Kaila Napolis	Ju-jitsu	Women's 52 kg	2 October

=== Multiple ===
Name	Sport	Gold	Silver	Bronze	Total
Carlos Yulo	Gymnastics	2	0	0	2
Jeus Yape	Taekwondo	1	0	1	2

== Medal summary ==
=== Medals by date ===
Medals by date
Day	Date	1st place, gold medalist(s)	2nd place, silver medalist(s)	3rd place, bronze medalist(s)	Total
1	20 September	0	0	1	1
2	21 September	0	0	1	1
3	22 September	0	1	1	2
4	23 September	0	0	1	1
5	24 September	1	0	0	1
6	25 September	1	1	1	3
7	26 September	0	0	1	1
8	27 September	0	0	2	2
9	28 September	0	0	2	2
10	29 September	1	1	2	4
11	30 September	0	0	0	0
12	1 October	0	2	2	4
13	2 October	1	3	2	6
14	3 October	0	1	0	1
15	4 October	0	0	0	0
Total		4	9	16	29

=== Medals by sports ===
Medals by sports
Sport	1st place, gold medalist(s)	2nd place, silver medalist(s)	3rd place, bronze medalist(s)	Total
Gymnastics	2	0	1	3
Taekwondo	1	3	1	5
Athletics	1	0	2	3
Ju-jitsu	0	1	1	2
Mixed martial arts	0	1	1	2
Sepak takraw	0	1	1	2
3x3 basketball	0	1	0	1
Archery	0	1	0	1
Boxing	0	1	0	1
Esports	0	0	2	2
Karate	0	0	2	2
Beach volleyball	0	0	1	1
Soft tennis	0	0	1	1
Surfing	0	0	1	1
Tennis	0	0	1	1
Weightlifting	0	0	1	1
Total	4	9	16	29

=== Medals by gender ===
Medals by gender
Gender	1st place, gold medalist(s)	2nd place, silver medalist(s)	3rd place, bronze medalist(s)	Total	Percentage
Male	4	3	9	16	55.2%
Female	0	6	7	13	44.8%
Mixed	0	0	0	0	0%
Total	4	9	16	29	100%

== Competitors ==
The following is a list of the number of competitors representing The Philippines that will participate at the Asian Games:

Sport	Men	Women	Total
3x3 basketball	4	4	8
Archery	6	6	12
Athletics	16	10	26
Baseball	24	0	24
Basketball	12	12	24
Beach volleyball	4	4	8
Boxing	4	3	7
Cycling	2	2	4
Equestrian	1	1	2
Esports	30	0	30
Fencing	6	6	12
Football	23	23	46
Golf	3	3	6
Gymnastics	6	8	14
Judo	6	3	9
Ju-jitsu	9	6	15
Karate	2	4	6
Kurash	3	3	6
Mixed martial arts	2	1	3
Modern pentathlon	4	3	7
Padel	4	4	8
Rowing	4	1	5
Rugby sevens	13	0	13
Sailing	4	4	8
Sepak takraw	12	9	21
Shooting	9	2	11
Skateboarding	3	2	5
Softball	0	17	17
Soft tennis	5	5	10
Squash	4	2	6
Surfing	2	2	4
Swimming	2	5	7
Taewondo	3	4	7
Tennis	1	4	5
Teqball	3	1	4
Triathlon	3	2	5
Volleyball	12	12	24
Weightlifting	2	3	5
Wrestling	4	3	7
Wushu	8	2	10
Total	265	186	451

== Archery ==
=== Compound ===
Athlete	Event	Ranking Round		Round of 32	Round of 16	Quarterfinals	Semifinals	Finals	Rank
Athlete	Event	Total Score	Seed	Opposition Score	Opposition Score	Opposition Score	Opposition Score	Opposition Score	Rank
Paul Dela Cruz	Men's individual	695	32 Q	Rattanapongkiat (THA); W 148–147	Chang Ch-w (TPE); L 145–149	Did not advance			
Alon Jucutan	Men's individual	673	41	Did not advance					
Jeremy Reaport	Men's individual	692	36 Q	Chang Ch-w (TPE); L 144–148	Did not advance				
Vanessa Caparas	Women's individual	667	43	Did not advance					
Amaya Cojuangco	Women's individual	691	28 Q	Wei F. (CHN); W 145–145	Lê P.N.A. (VIE); W 146–143	Asheghzadeh Oskouei (IRI); W 146–135	Park J-y (KOR); W 143–142	Ashrifah (INA); L 137–139	2nd place, silver medalist(s)
Michiko Gonzales	Women's individual	682	36 Q	Karunaratne (SRI); W 141–136	Kaewchomphu (THA); L 144–149	Did not advance			
Paul Dela Cruz; Alon Jucutan; Jeremy Reaport	Men's team	2060	12 Q	Vietnam (VIE); L 228–235	Did not advance				
Vanessa Caparas; Amaya Cojuangco; Michiko Gonzales	Women's team	2040	12 Q	Chinese Taipei (TPE); L 227–236	Did not advance				
Amaya Cojuangco; Paul Dela Cruz	Mixed team	1386	12 Q	Thailand (THA); L 154–159	Did not advance				

=== Recurve ===
Athlete	Event	Ranking Round		Round of 32	Round of 16	Quarterfinals	Semifinals	Finals	Rank
Athlete	Event	Total Score	Seed	Opposition Score	Opposition Score	Opposition Score	Opposition Score	Opposition Score	Rank
Chass Colas	Men's individual	660	29 Q	da Cruz (TLS); W 6–0	Abdullin (KAZ); L 3–7	Did not advance			
Girvin Garcia	Men's individual	643	44 Q	Alkaabi (UAE); W 6–2	Bommadevara (IND); L 0–6	Did not advance			
Renian Nawew	Men's individual	630	49	Did not advance					
Gabrielle Bidaure	Women's individual	639	28 Q	Bye	Hamroeva (UZB); W 7–3	Hsu Hs-tz (TPE); L 2–6	Did not advance		
Giuliana Garcia	Women's individual	628	33	Did not advance					
Naina Tagle	Women's individual	666	9 Q	Bye	Uddin (BAN); L 2–6	Did not advance			
Chass Colas; Girvin Garcia; Renian Nawew	Men's team	1933	15	Bye	India (IND); L 1–5	Did not advance			
Gabrielle Bidaure; Giuliana Garcia; Naina Tagle	Women's team	1933	8	Bye	Kazakhstan (KAZ); L 4–5	Did not advance			
Girvin Garcia; Giuliana Garcia	Mixed team	1326	11	Bye	Indonesia (INA); W 6–2	Japan (JPN); L 3–5	Did not advance		

== Athletics ==
The Philippines plan to send 20 athletes.

Sonny Wagdos withdrew from the men's marathon due to high fever as he was preparing for the event. Wagdos is expected to compete in men's 5,000 metre event if he recovers from his illness.

=== Results ===
Key

- Q = Qualified for the next round
- q = Qualified for the next round as a fastest loser or, in field events, by position without achieving the qualifying target
- GR = Asian Games record
- NR = National record
- PB = Personal best
- SB = Season best
- NM = No mark
- N/A = Round not applicable for the event

=== Men ===
==== Track and road events ====
Athlete	Event	Heat		Semifinals		Final	
Athlete	Event	Result	Rank	Result	Rank	Result	Rank
Kent Jardin	100 m	10.74	6	Did not advance			
Anfernee Lopena	100 m	10.65	5	Did not advance			
Neil Catral	200 m	21.49	4 Q	21.33	6	Did not advance	
Gabriel Borado	400 m	48.14	7	Did not advance			
Michael del Prado	400 m	48.13	7	Did not advance			
Hussein Loraña	800 m	1:51.68	4	—N/a		Did not advance	
Yacine Guermali	1500 m	—N/a		—N/a		Withdrew	
Yacine Guermali	5000 m	—N/a				13:44.61	5
Sonny Wagdos	5000 m	—N/a				14:29.42	11 PB
Richard Salaño	Marathon	—N/a				2:20:34	14
Sonny Wagdos	Marathon	—N/a				Withdrew	
Nathaniel Seiler	20 km walk	—N/a				Withdrew	
Nathaniel Seiler	50 km walk	—N/a				DSQ	
John Cabang	110 m hurdles	13.58	2 Q	—N/a		13.48 SB	3rd place, bronze medalist(s)
Jazzper Arcenal	400m hurdles	51.47	5	Did not advance			
Jazzper Arcenal; Gabriel Borado; Michael del Prado; Hussein Loraña; Frederick Ramirez	4 × 400m relay	3:10.58	3 Q SB	—N/a		3:12.24	7

==== Field events ====
Athlete	Event	Qualification		Final	
Athlete	Event	Distance	Position	Distance	Position
Leonard Grospe	High jump	—N/a		2.05	9
Kent Jardin	Long jump	Withdrew			
Janry Ubas	Long jump	7.59	5 q	7.39	11
EJ Obiena	Pole vault	—N/a		5.91 GR	1st place, gold medalist(s)

=== Women ===
==== Track and road events ====
Athlete	Event	Heat		Semifinals		Final	
Athlete	Event	Result	Rank	Result	Rank	Result	Rank
Jessica Lawrence	100m	11.62	4 q	11.57	4 q	11.58	8
Zion Corrales-Nelson	100m	11.68	3 Q	11.63	5	Did not advance	
Naomi Kaylia Johnson	200m	23.76	5	Did not advance			
Zion Corrales-Nelson	200m	23.85	4	Did not advance			
Naomi Kaylia Johnson	400m	—N/a				Withdrew	
Jeralyn Rodriguez	400m	—N/a				Withdrew	
Victoria Bossong	800m	2:02.34	1 Q	—N/a		2:05.34	3rd place, bronze medalist(s)
Naomi Cesar	800m	—N/a				Withdrew	
Naomi Cesar	1500m	—N/a				Withdrew	
Artjoy Torregosa	Marathon	—N/a				2:48:36	14
Lauren Hoffman	400m hurdles	57.94	4	—N/a		Did not advance	
Lauren Hoffman; Naomi Kaylia Johnson; Kristina Knott; Jessica Laurence; Zion Corrales-Nelson; Lianne Pama	4 × 100m relay	43.88	3 Q SB	—N/a		43.60	5 SB

=== Mixed ===
Athlete	Event	Heat		Final	
Athlete	Event	Result	Rank	Result	Rank
Neil Catral; Jessica Laurence; Anfernee Lopena; Zion Corrales-Nelson	4 × 100m relay	41.92	4 q SB	42.20	6
Gabriel Borado; Victoria Bossong; Michael del Prado; Naomi Kaylia Johnson	4 × 400m relay	3:19.68	8 q	3:22.23	8

== Baseball ==
Team	Event	Preliminary round				Placement / Super round			Final	
Team	Event	Opposition Score	Opposition Score	Opposition Score	Rank	Opposition Score	Opposition Score	Rank	Opposition Score	Rank
Philippines men's	Men's tournament	Palestine; W 12–0	China; L 8–15	Japan; L 0–7	3 PR	Thailand; W 18–7	Hong Kong; L 5–7	1	Did not advance	5

== Basketball ==
Both the Philippines men's and women's national basketball teams are expected to join the 2026 Asian Games. The men's tournament is slated to begin on 10 September or nine days ahead of the opening ceremony.

Summary

Team	Event	Group Stage				Play-ins	Quarterfinals	Semifinals	Final	
Team	Event	Opposition Score	Opposition Score	Opposition Score	Rank	Opposition Score	Opposition Score	Opposition Score	Opposition Score	Rank
Philippines men's	Men's 5x5 tournament	Bahrain; L 85–89	Kazakhstan; W 109–78	China; L 61–105	3	—	Did not advance			9
Philippines women's	Women's 5x5 tournament	Kazakhstan; W 86–58	Hong Kong; W 90–73	Japan; L 67–89	2 Q	—	Chinese Taipei; L 71–83	Did not advance		5
Philippines men's	Men's 3x3 tournament	Mongolia; W 19–12	Sri Lanka; W 21–12	Kazakhstan; W 21–15	1 Q	Bye	Chinese Taipei; W 21–19	South Korea; L 9–21	Iran; L 10–21	4
Philippines women's	Women's 3x3 tournament	Mongolia; W 17–12	Macau; W 21–4	Malaysia; W 17–12	1 Q	Bye	Singapore; W 22–12	Thailand; W 13–8	Japan; L 11–21	2nd place, silver medalist(s)

=== 5x5 basketball ===
==== Men's tournament ====
The Philippine men's team is different from the one which competed in the 2027 FIBA Basketball World Cup qualifiers. The team is still led by head coach Tim Cone who justified using a different squad citing the campaign of the 2014 Asian Games team in Incheon. The team which were coming off from playing in the 2014 FIBA Basketball World Cup finish seventh in the Asian tournament. The 12-man roster was finalized on 2 September, including Justin Brownlee who was injured just in case he received medical clearance. However, Calvin Oftana whose name was in the 30-man list submitted to the organizers in July 2026, replaced Brownlee.

Bahrain, which has four naturalized players, upset the Philippines by winning 89–85 in the opening game. The Philippines recovered by winning the second game against Kazakhstan, 109–78. However, the Asian Games campaign ended after losing 61–105 to China in their final group match. They failed to advance to the quarterfinals due to being the worse third placed team across all groups. This marks the first time the Philippines failed to qualify to the final round in men's basketball at the Asian Games since 1966.

Team roster

Philippines men's national basketball team – 2026 Asian Games roster
Players
Coaches

Pos.	No.	Name	Age – Date of birth	Height	Club	Ctr.
G	1	Adrian Nocum	27 – 10 August 1999	1.83 m (6 ft 0 in)	Rain or Shine Elasto Painters	(Philippines)
G	2	Sedrick Barefield	29 – 18 November 1996	1.88 m (6 ft 2 in)	Blackwater Bossing	(Philippines)
G	4	RJ Abarrientos	26 – 14 September 1999	1.81 m (5 ft 11 in)	Barangay Ginebra San Miguel	(Philippines)
F	6	Don Trollano	34 – 7 January 1992	1.91 m (6 ft 3 in)	San Miguel Beermen	(Philippines)
G	7	Jerrick Ahanmisi	28 – 16 October 1997	1.85 m (6 ft 1 in)	San Miguel Beermen	(Philippines)
G	8	Robert Bolick	30 – 13 September 1995	1.85 m (6 ft 1 in)	NLEX Road Warriors	(Philippines)
F	16	Calvin Oftana	30 – 3 January 1996	1.96 m (6 ft 5 in)	TNT Tropang 5G	(Philippines)
C	17	Brandon Bates	30 – 12 August 1996	2.06 m (6 ft 9 in)	Meralco Bolts	(Philippines)
F/C	19	Justine Baltazar	29 – 19 February 1997	2.07 m (6 ft 9 in)	Converge FiberXers	(Philippines)
C	21	Justin Arana	27 – 21 March 1999	2.00 m (6 ft 7 in)	Converge FiberXers	(Philippines)
F	22	Zavier Lucero	27 – 5 April 1999	1.98 m (6 ft 6 in)	Magnolia Chicken Timplados Hotshots	(Philippines)
F/C	34	Brandon Ganuelas-Rosser	32 – 29 June 1994	1.98 m (6 ft 6 in)	TNT Tropang 5G	(Philippines)

Head coach

- (United States) Tim Cone

Assistant coach(es)

- (Philippines) Richard del Rosario

Legend

- (C) Team captain
- (NP) Naturalized player
- Club – describes last
  club before the tournament
- Age – describes age
  on 10 September 2026

Preliminary Rounds – Group C

Pos	Team	Pld	W	L	PF	PA	PD	Pts	Qualification
1	China	3	3	0	309	181	+128	6	Quarterfinals
2	Bahrain	3	2	1	249	268	−19	5	Quarterfinals
3	Philippines	3	1	2	255	272	−17	4	
4	Kazakhstan	3	0	3	217	309	−92	3	

Source: AsianGames2026.org

11 September 2026
13:00

Report
Box score

Philippines	85–89	Bahrain
Scoring by quarter: 21–29, 22–20, 18–27, 24–13
Pts: Oftana 31; Rebs: Lucero 9 Asts: Lucero, Nocum 5		Pts: Sampson 24; Rebs: Sampson 13; Asts: Sampson 8

Aichi International Arena, Nagoya
Attendance: 7,557
Referees: Rabah Noujaim (LBN), Mohammad Taha (JOR), Lee Ji-youn (KOR)

12 September 2026
19:00

Report
Box score

Kazakhstan	78–109	Philippines
Scoring by quarter: 15–18, 22–32, 29–32, 12–27
Pts: Bykov 15; Rebs: Bykov 10; Asts: Fedchenko, Rabchenyuk 5		Pts: Ahanmisi 22; Rebs: Bates, Lucero 9 Asts: Barefield 5

Aichi International Arena, Nagoya
Attendance: 8,026
Referees: Mohammad Taha (JOR), Chuang Chih-chun (TPE), Abdullah Al-Hejaili (KSA)

14 September 2026
13:00

Report
Box score

China	105–61	Philippines
Scoring by quarter: 36–16, 30–14, 13–10, 26–21
Pts: Wang 20; Rebs: Wang 14; Asts: four players 4		Pts: Oftana 13; Rebs: Lucero 6 Asts: Barefield, Bolick 4

Aichi International Arena, Nagoya
Attendance: 4,307
Referees: Rabah Noujaim (LBN), Wissam Zein (SYR), Nattapong Jontapa (THA)

==== Women's tournament ====
The women's team are coming off from competing in the 2026 FIBA Women's Olympic Pre-Qualifying Tournament under their new head coach BT Toews.

Team roster

Philippines women's national basketball team – 2026 Asian Games roster
Players
Coaches

Pos.	No.	Name	Age – Date of birth	Height	Club	Ctr.
F	3	Afril Bernardino	30 – 3 April 1996	1.72 m (5 ft 8 in)	Batangas New Zealand Bluefire	(Philippines)
F	5	Kent Pastrana	26 – 5 September 2000	1.70 m (5 ft 7 in)
G	7	Janine Pontejos	33 – 29 October 1992	1.65 m (5 ft 5 in)	Akari Sparks	(Philippines)
C	8	Angelica Surada	25 – 5 May 2001	1.75 m (5 ft 9 in)
G	10	Hazelle Yam	28 – 20 October 1997
G	11	Stefanie Berberabe	26 – 13 July 2000	1.63 m (5 ft 4 in)	Rockingham Flames	(Australia)
G	12	Monique Del Carmen	28 – 21 December 1997
F	15	Jhazmin Joson	27 – 15 August 1999	1.70 m (5 ft 7 in)	Southern Tigers	(Australia)
F	20	Karl Pingol	24 – 14 October 2001
F	21	Camille Clarin	25 – 28 May 2001
G	25	Elizabeth Means (NP)	23 – 31 October 2002
F	45	Camille Malagar	24 – 10 March 2002

Head coach

- (Canada) BT Toews

Assistant coach(es)

- (Philippines) Raymond Austria
- (Philippines) Raiza Palmera-Dy

Legend

- (C) Team captain
- (NP) Naturalized player
- Club – describes last
  club before the tournament
- Age – describes age
  on 17 September 2026

Preliminary Rounds – Group B

Pos	Team	Pld	W	L	PF	PA	PD	Pts	Qualification
1	Japan (H)	3	3	0	291	127	+164	6	Quarterfinals
2	Philippines	3	2	1	243	220	+23	5	Quarterfinals
3	Kazakhstan	3	1	2	161	251	−90	4	
4	Hong Kong	3	0	3	187	284	−97	3	

Source: aichi-nagoya2026.org
(H) Hosts

17 September 2026
16:00

Report
Results

Philippines	86–58	Kazakhstan
Scoring by quarter: 25–9, 24–23, 27–8, 10–18
Pts: Means 23; Rebs: Surada 5 Asts: Berberabe 8		Pts: Noiok 11; Rebs: Bezgodova 15; Asts: Koroleva 5

Aichi International Arena, Nagoya
Attendance: 1,549
Referees: Hu Jing (CHN), Budi Marfan (INA), Chuang Chih-Chun (TPE)

20 September 2026
10:00

Report
Results

Hong Kong	73–90	Philippines
Scoring by quarter: 21–21, 19–25, 20–23, 13–21
Pts: Li 30; Rebs: 3 players 5 Asts: Tsui 9		Pts: Berberabe 21; Rebs: Bernardino 11; Asts: Bernardino 4

Aichi International Arena, Nagoya
Attendance: 7,360
Referees: Lee Ji-youn (KOR), Budi Marfan (INA), Mandy Ngieng (MAS)

22 September 2026
13:00

Report
Results

Japan	89–67	Philippines
Scoring by quarter: 24–11, 28–21, 16–18, 21–17
Pts: Okamoto 19; Rebs: Tanaka 8 Asts: Miura, Higuchi 5		Pts: Means 16; Rebs: Means 9 Asts: Berberabe 5

Aichi International Arena, Nagoya
Attendance: 5,897
Referees: Lee Jiyoun (KOR), Rabah Noujaim (LBN), Hu Jing (CHN)

=== 3x3 basketball ===
==== Men's tournament ====
Team roster

Philippines men's national 3x3 team – 2026 Asian Games roster
Players
Coaches

Pos.	No.	Name	Age – Date of birth	Height	Club	Ctr.
	5	Manuel Antonio Luis Pablo	22 – 5 June 2004	1.99 m (6 ft 6 in)	De La Salle Green Archers	(Philippines)
	9	Nic Cabañero	22 – 3 October 2003	1.91 m (6 ft 3 in)	Biñan Tatak Gel	(Philippines)
	19	David Andrei Dungo	21 – 19 October 2004	1.86 m (6 ft 1 in)	De La Salle Green Archers	(Philippines)
	91	Koji Buenaflor	20 – 19 November 2005	1.99 m (6 ft 6 in)	UST Growling Tigers	(Philippines)

Head coach

(Philippines) Patrick Fran

Legend

- (C) Team captain
- Club – describes last
  club before the tournament
- Age – describes age
  on 21 September 2026

Preliminary Rounds – Group A

Pos	Team	Pld	W	L	PF	PA	PD	Pts	Qualification
1	Philippines	3	3	0	61	39	+22	6	Quarterfinals
2	Mongolia	3	2	1	46	38	+8	5	Play-ins
3	Kazakhstan	3	1	2	40	49	−9	4	Play-ins
4	Sri Lanka	3	0	3	38	59	−21	3	

Source: asiangames2026.org

21 September
12:50

Report

Mongolia	12–19	Philippines
Pts: three players 4		Pts: Cabañero 7

Kinjō-futō Station Square, Nagoya
Referees: Su Yuyen (TPE), Danusorn Laosaksam (THA)

21 September
14:55

Report

Philippines	21–12	Sri Lanka
Pts: Cabañero 8		Pts: Jayasinghe 6

Kinjō-futō Station Square, Nagoya
Referees: Chen Kuan I (TPE), Danusorn Laosaksam (THA)

23 September
13:15

Report

Philippines	21–15	Kazakhstan
Pts: Cabañero 7		Pts: Tangiyev 6

Kinjō-futō Station Square, Nagoya
Referees: Kim Gain (KOR), Nie Cong (CHN)

Quarterfinals

24 September
18:30

Report

Philippines	21–19	Chinese Taipei
Pts: Cabañero 8		Pts: Yeh 10

Kinjō-futō Station Square, Nagoya
Referees: Kim Ga-in (KOR), Danusorn Laosaksam (THA)

Semifinals

25 September
13:50

Report

Philippines	9–21	South Korea
Pts: Pablo, Buenaflor 3		Pts: Kim 8

Kinjō-futō Station Square, Nagoya
Referees: Su Yu-yen (TPE), Neoh Yuen (MAS)

Third place match

25 September
18:30

Report

Philippines	10–21	Iran
Pts: Cabañero 4		Pts: Momeni 12

Kinjō-futō Station Square, Nagoya
Referees: Kim Ga-in (KOR), Lui Chee (MAS)

==== Women's tournament ====
Team roster

Philippines women's national 3x3 team – 2026 Asian Games roster
Players
Coaches

Pos.	No.	Name	Age – Date of birth	Height	Club	Ctr.
	5	Kennan Elizabeth Ka	22 – 17 July 2004		UP Fighting Maroons	(Philippines)
	7	Amyah Espanol	21 – 21 May 2005	1.73 m (5 ft 8 in)	FEU Lady Tamaraws	(Philippines)
	18	Maria Victoria Pasilang	21 – 18 July 2005		FEU Lady Tamaraws	(Philippines)
	28	Kacey dela Rosa	22 – 1 March 2004	1.83 m (6 ft 0 in)	Ateneo Blue Eagles	(Philippines)

Head coach

(Philippines) Anton Altamirano

Legend

- (C) Team captain
- Club – describes last
  club before the tournament
- Age – describes age
  on 21 September 2026

Preliminary Rounds – Group C

Pos	Team	Pld	W	L	PF	PA	PD	Pts	Qualification
1	Philippines	3	3	0	55	28	+27	6	Quarterfinals
2	Malaysia	3	2	1	43	31	+12	5	Play-ins
3	Mongolia	3	1	2	38	43	−5	4	Play-ins
4	Macau	3	0	3	16	50	−34	3	

Source: 2026 Asian Games

22 September
12:00

Report

Mongolia	12–17	Philippines
Pts: Batjargal 11		Pts: dela Rosa 10

Kinjō-futō Station Square, Nagoya
Referees: Su Yu-yen (TPE), Alexandr Rulyov (KAZ)

22 September
14:05

Report

Philippines	21–4	Macau
Pts: Pasilang 8		Pts: Tai 3

Kinjō-futō Station Square, Nagoya
Referees: Chen Kuan-i (TPE), Neoh Yuen (MAS)

23 September
18:05

Report

Philippines	17–12	Malaysia
Pts: dela Rosa 8		Pts: Chong 4

Kinjō-futō Station Square, Nagoya
Referees: Su Yu-yen (TPE), Alexandr Rulyov (KAZ)

Quarterfinals

24 September
19:45

Report

Singapore	12–22	Philippines
Pts: Lai 6		Pts: Espanol, Ka 7

Kinjō-futō Station Square, Nagoya
Referees: Nie Cong (CHN), Su Yu-yen (TPE)

Semifinals

25 September
13:25

Report

Thailand	8–13	Philippines
Pts: Panted 4		Pts: Pasilang 5

Kinjō-futō Station Square, Nagoya
Referees: Li Caiyan (CHN), Kim Ga-in (KOR)

Finals

25 September
19:00

Report

Japan	21–11	Philippines
Pts: Hirashita 9		Pts: dela Rosa 6

Kinjō-futō Station Square, Nagoya
Referees: Chen Kuan-i (TPE), Alexandr Rulyov (KAZ)

== Boxing ==
The Association of Boxing Alliances in the Philippines (ABAP) fielded a seven-member squad for the 2026 Asian Games.

Due to Marcial's scheduled professional bout, Weljon Mindoro was considered as a replacement in the 80 kg division. However, Mindoro's August 2026 knockout loss to Carlos Ocampo made him ineligible to compete for 60 to 90 days, extending into the Asian Games. Marcial, who remained entered by the ABAP, ultimately withdrew despite a 19 September knockout win over Omar Huerta, citing the risk posed by the short turnaround.

The Philippines' medal streak in boxing was preserved by Carlo Paalam's victory in the quarterfinals. However, the gold medal drought dating back to the 2010 edition continued as he lost via split decision in the final.

=== Men ===
Athlete	Event	Round of 32	Round of 16	Quarterfinals	Semifinals	Final	Rank
Athlete	Event	Opposition Result	Opposition Result	Opposition Result	Opposition Result	Opposition Result	Rank
Carlo Paalam	55 kg	Bye	Mandengbam (IND); W 3–0	Zhang J. (CHN); W 3–2	Sabyrkhan (KAZ); W 3–2	Yamaguchi (JPN); L 2–3	2nd place, silver medalist(s)
Junmilardo Ogayre	60 kg	Gantumur (MGL); W 3–2	Roka Magar (NEP); W 5–0	Khalokov (UZB); L 0–5	Did not advance		
Norlan Petecio	70 kg	Vy (CAM); W 5–0	Okazawa (JPN); L 0–5	Did not advance			
Eumir Marcial	80 kg	Withdrew					

=== Women ===
Athlete	Event	Round of 32	Round of 16	Quarterfinals	Semifinals	Final	Rank
Athlete	Event	Opposition Result	Opposition Result	Opposition Result	Opposition Result	Opposition Result	Rank
Aira Villegas	51 kg	Chaudhary (IND); L 0–5	Did not advance				
Riza Pasuit	54 kg	Bye	Chongprongklang (THA); L 0–5	Did not advance			
Nesthy Petecio	60 kg	—N/a	Abukhadijah (JOR); W RSC	Yang Ch. (CHN); L 0–5	Did not advance		

== Cycling ==
=== BMX ===
Athlete	Event	Motos									Final	
Athlete	Event	Heat	Run 1		Run 2		Run 3		Points	Rank	Time	Rank
Athlete	Event	Heat	Time	Rank	Time	Rank	Time	Rank	Points	Rank	Time	Rank
Daniel Caluag	Men's BMX racing	1	33.365	6	31.608	2	2:05.312	6	14	11	Did not advance	
Patrick Coo	Men's BMX racing	1	30.887	2	32.179	3	30.594	2	7	4 Q	54.897	7

=== Mountain bike ===
Athlete	Event	Lap 1		Lap 2		Lap 3		Lap 4		Lap 5		Lap 6		Lap 7		Final	
Athlete	Event	Time	Rank	Time	Rank	Time	Rank	Time	Rank	Time	Rank	Time	Rank	Time	Rank	Time	Rank
Adel Sendrijas	Women's cross-country	15:17	14	29:49	12	44:11	10	58:46	10	1:14:38	—N/a					LAP	
Shagne Yaoyao	Women's cross-country	14:20	9	28:35	9	42:58	9	57:06	9	1:11:39	—N/a					LAP	

== Equestrian ==
Toni Leviste qualified for her fifth Asian Games. However this will be her first dressage qualification. She qualified two horse-and-rider combinations with her mounts, Lacoste 126 and Fanto.

Athlete	Horse	Event	Qualifier 1			Qualifier 2			Final round A			Final round B		
Athlete	Horse	Event	Penalties	Total	Rank	Penalties	Total	Rank	Penalties	Total	Rank	Penalties	Total	Rank
Toni Leviste	Lacoste 126	Individual dressage	1	61.265	32	0	62.559	38	Did not advance					
Colin John Syquia	333 105MA68 Hocus Pocus	Individual jumping A	—N/a						2	82.68	8	7	81.42	9

== Esports ==
The Philippines national esports team will take part at the Asian Games in six events. Team Sibol qualified athletes for Honor of Kings, Identity V, Mobile Legends: Bang Bang, and Naraka: Bladepoint via qualification tournaments. They made a failed qualification attempt for PUBG Mobile. It did not send a team for the League of Legends qualifiers.

Additionally, Sibol has named representatives for Pokémon Unite and Puyo Puyo Champions. The Pokemon Unite team will be composed of Team Nemesis players.

Team

Gamer	Event	Group Stage				Quarterfinals	Semifinals	Finals	
Gamer	Event	Opposition Score	Opposition Score	Opposition Score	Rank	Opposition Score	Opposition Score	Opposition Score	Rank
Dragon Dajao; Golden Dajao; Charles Esguerra; Chammy Nazarrea; Justine Tan; Jhon Tungol	Honor of Kings	Kazakhstan (KAZ); W 2–0	Malaysia (MAS); L 1–2	—N/a	2 Q	South Korea (KOR); W 2–0	China (CHN); L 0–2	Did not advance	3rd place, bronze medalist(s)
Psalm Cortez; Sander Gallo; Joshua Gumaro; Johannes Juico; Xyrel Julian; Japhet Onquit; Joachim Timtiman	Identity V	Thailand (THA); L 0–2	Chinese Taipei (TPE); L 0–2	Indonesia (INA); W 2–1	3 Q	Malaysia (MAS); L 0–2	Did not advance		
Karl Nepomuceno; Alston Pabico; Duane Pillas; Marco Stephen Requitiano; Dave Viana Jr. Sanford Vinuya	MLBB	Jordan (JOR); W 2–0	Kazakhstan (KAZ); W 2–0	—N/a	1 Q	Indonesia (INA); L 1–2	Did not advance		
Richard Espejo; Raphaelron Paclibar; Kenneth Perez; Ouhrich Von Teñoso	Naraka: Bladepoint	Chinese Taipei (TPE); L 0–2	Vietnam (VIE); L 0–2	Hong Kong (HKG); W 2–1	3	—N/a	Did not advance		
Rence Gatmaitan; David Lance; Ducke Leoncio; Robert Mempin; Michael Ocio; Kim Rey Salazar	Pokémon Unite	Kazakhstan (KAZ); DNS	Chinese Taipei (TPE); W 2–0	Malaysia (MAS); W 2–0	1 Q	Hong Kong (HKG); W 2–0	Indonesia (INA); L 0–2	Did not advance	3rd place, bronze medalist(s)

Individual

Gamer	Event	Group Stage					Quarterfinals	Semifinals	Final	
Gamer	Event	Opposition Score	Opposition Score	Opposition Score	Opposition Score	Rank	Opposition Score	Opposition Score	Opposition Score	Rank
Karl Owen Gonzalvo	Puyo Puyo Champions	Kirihara (JPN); L 0–3	Yu W.L. (HKG); W 3–2	Pivovarov (KAZ); W 3–0	Kang D-sh (KOR); L 2–3	3 Q	Wongkitikun (THA); L 2–5	Did not advance		

== Fencing ==
=== Men's ===
Athlete	Event	Round of Pool		Round of 32	Round of 16	Quarterfinals	Semifinals	Final	
Athlete	Event	Result	Rank	Opposition Score	Opposition Score	Opposition Score	Opposition Score	Opposition Score	Rank
Jian Bautista	Individual épée	Nguyễn P. Đ. (VIE); L 2–5; Askarshozoda (TJK); W 5–1; Kurbanov (KAZ); L 1–5; Lan (CHN); L 2–5; Ali (BAN); W 5–4; Si To (SGP); L 1–5	=35 Q	Yamada (JPN); L 8–11	Did not advance				31
Noelito Jose Jr.	Individual épée	Alblooshi (UAE); L 3–5; Anokhin (UZB); W 5–3; Alfudari (KUW); W 5–2; Lee R. (TPE); W 5–2; Park S-y (KOR); L 2–5	=16 Q	Anokhin (UZB); W 15–12	Fong (HKG); L 14–15	Did not advance			12
Nathaniel Perez	Individual foil	Choi (HKG); L 0–5; Al-Jallaf (UAE); W 5–2; Chen Y-t (TPE); L 3–5; Samuel (SGP); L 3–5; Arjoni (INA); L 3–5	27 Q	Zeng (CHN); L 6–15	Did not advance				27
Samuel Tranquilan	Individual foil	Iimura (JPN); L 1–5; Al-Shuaibi (OMA); W 5–1; Sanasam (IND); L 2–5; Tan (SGP); L 1–5; Cheong C.K. (MAC); L 1–5	30	Did not advance					30
Christian Concepcion	Individual sabre	Do (KOR); L 3–5; Al-Hammadi (UAE); W 5–3; Al-Mutairi (KSA); W 5–1; Aymuratov (UZB); W 5–4; Sarkissyan (KAZ); W 2–5	11 Q	Tahla (JOR); W 15–8	Fotouhi Firozabad (IRI); L 7–15	Did not advance			11
Eunice Villanueva	Individual sabre	Nguyễn X. L. (VIE); W 5–3; Luo (CHN); L 2–5; Abdulkareem (KUW); L 5–3; Pakdaman (IRI); L 0–5; Ejaz (PAK); W 5–1	13 Q	Al-Mutairi (KSA); L 9–15	Did not advance				18
Jian Bautista; Noelito Jose Jr. Nathaniel Perez; Samuel Tranquilan	Team épée	—N/a		Bye	Singapore (SGP); L 30–45	Did not advance			10
Christian Concepcion; Nathaniel Perez; Samuel Tranquilan; Eunice Villanueva	Team sabre	—N/a			India (IND); L 45–27	Did not advance			9

=== Women's ===
Athlete	Event	Round of Pool		Round of 32	Round of 16	Quarterfinals	Semifinals	Final	
Athlete	Event	Result	Rank	Opposition Score	Opposition Score	Opposition Score	Opposition Score	Opposition Score	Rank
Juliana Gomez	Individual épée	Andreyeva (KAZ); W 5–2; Yang (CHN); W 5–2; Keneshova (KGZ); W 5–2; Mansi (JOR); W 5–4; Terayama (JPN); L 4–5	13 Q	Alrefae (KUW); W 15–8	Koh (SGP); L 1–3	Did not advance			14
Alexa Larrazabal	Individual épée	Nguyễn P.K. (VIE); L 3–5; Khakimova (UZB); L 3–5; Tang (CHN); L 2–5; Chaudhari (IND); W 4–3; Koh (SGP); L 3–5	26	Did not advance					26
Janna Catantan	Individual foil	Cheng (HKG); L 0–5; Volobueva (UZB); L 4–5; Ueno (JPN); L 0–5; Devi (IND); L 3–5; Winona (INA); W 5–1	=18 Q	Wong (SGP); L 2–15	Did not advance				=18
Samantha Catantan	Individual foil	Kumalaputra (INA); W 5–0; Fu (CHN); W 4–5; Park J-h (KOR); W 4–3; Al-Blooshi (UAE); W 5–0; Gnoyeva (KAZ); W 3–2	5 Q	Bye	Ku Hio Lam (MAC); W 15–13	Park J-h (KOR); L 10–15	Did not advance		6
Queen Denice Dalmacio	Individual sabre	Gupta (IND); L 2–5; Emura (JPN); L 0–5; Anggraini (INA); W 5–2; Pan (CHN); W 5–2; Heng (SGP); L 4–5	15 Q	Phokaew (THA); W 15–14	Emura (JPN); L 2–15	Did not advance			15
Jylyn Nicanor	Individual sabre	Phokaew (THA); L 1–5; Jeon H-y (KOR); L 3–5; Yuina (JPN); L 4–5; Sit (HKG); L 2–5; Agustina (INA); W 5–4	20 Q	Heng (SGP); L 10–15	Did not advance				20
Janna Catantan; Samantha Catantan; Juliana Gomez; Alexa Larrazabal	Team épée	—N/a			Vietnam (VIE); L 29–45	Did not advance			10
Janna Catantan; Samantha Catantan; Queen Denice Dalmacio; Jylyn Nicanor	Team sabre	—N/a			Singapore (SGP); L 23–45	Did not advance			9

== Football ==
The Philippines women's national football team has qualified for the 2026 Asian Games as one of the participating teams of the 2026 AFC Women's Asian Cup in Australia. The team is expected to face roster composition issues due to the tournament falling outside the FIFA window. The men's national under-23 team also qualified.

Summary

Key:

- A.E.T – After extra time.
- P – Match decided by penalty-shootout.

Team	Event	Group Stage				Quarterfinals	Semifinals	Final	
Team	Event	Opposition Score	Opposition Score	Opposition Score	Rank	Opposition Score	Opposition Score	Opposition Score	Rank
Philippines men's under-23	Men's tournament	Uzbekistan; L 1–5	Vietnam; L 0–2	Kuwait; W 2–1	3	Did not advance			
Philippines women's	Women's tournament	Uzbekistan; D 1–1	Hong Kong; W 2–0	China; L 1–5	3 Q	Japan; L 0–4	Did not advance		

=== Men's tournament ===
Team roster

The Philippines announced their 29-man preliminary squad on 5 September. The final squad was announced on 14 September.

Head coach: (Australia) Garrath McPherson

No.	Pos.	Player	Date of birth (age)	Club
1	GK	Nicholas Guimarães	9 August 2006 (aged 20)	(Japan Football Association) Machida Zelvia
2	DF	Bryan Villanueva	30 July 2006 (aged 20)	Free agent
3	DF	Gabriel Guimarães	9 August 2006 (aged 20)	(Philippine Football Federation) Kaya–Iloilo
4	DF	Kamil Amirul	6 February 2004 (aged 22)	(Philippine Football Federation) Dynamic Herb Cebu
5	DF	Josh Meriño	11 February 2005 (aged 21)	(Philippine Football Federation) UP Fighting Maroons
6	MF	Sandro Reyes	29 March 2003 (aged 23)	Free agent
7	MF	Scott Woods*	7 May 2000 (aged 26)	(Football Association of Malaysia) Kuching City
8	MF	Gavin Muens	24 October 2004 (aged 21)	Free agent
9	FW	Andres Aldeguer	18 December 2003 (aged 22)	(Philippine Football Federation) One Taguig
10	MF	John Lucero	1 December 2003 (aged 22)	(Philippine Football Federation) One Taguig
11	MF	Dov Cariño	18 December 2003 (aged 22)	(Philippine Football Federation) Ateneo Blue Booters
12	GK	Alfonso Gonzalez	5 January 2005 (aged 21)	(Philippine Football Federation) UP Fighting Maroons
13	MF	Ryen Lim	9 July 2005 (aged 21)	(Philippine Football Federation) One Taguig
14	DF	Jaime Rosquillo	10 March 2003 (aged 23)	(Philippine Football Federation) Dynamic Herb Cebu
15	MF	Ethan Smith	2 June 2006 (aged 20)	(The Football Association) Notts County U21
16	MF	Jared Peña	5 August 2006 (aged 20)	(United States Soccer Federation) Walsh Cavaliers
17	DF	Brian McManus Jr.	26 June 2005 (aged 21)	(United States Soccer Federation) North Florida Ospreys
18	MF	Michael Baldisimo*	13 April 2000 (aged 26)	(Canadian Soccer Association) Cavalry
19	DF	Christian Rontini*	20 July 1999 (aged 27)	(Italian Football Federation) Antella
20	DF	Antoine Ortega	12 May 2003 (aged 23)	(Philippine Football Federation) Kaya–Iloilo
21	DF	Santiago Rublico	18 August 2005 (aged 21)	(Royal Spanish Football Federation) Alcorcón B
22	FW	Aidan Astilla	1 January 2006 (aged 20)	(United States Soccer Federation) CSUMB Otters
23	GK	Patrick Dye	11 July 2004 (aged 22)	(United States Soccer Federation) ONU Tigers

* Over-aged player.

Preliminary rounds – Group C

Pos	Team	Pld	W	D	L	GF	GA	GD	Pts	Qualification
1	Uzbekistan	3	3	0	0	9	1	+8	9	Advance to knockout stage
2	Vietnam	3	1	1	1	3	3	0	4	Advance to knockout stage
3	Philippines	3	1	0	2	3	8	−5	3	
4	Kuwait	3	0	1	2	2	5	−3	1	

Source: Aichi–Nagoya 26
15 September 2026
15:30

Uzbekistan	5–1	Philippines
Urinboev 30'; Saidnurullaev 60', 71'; Fayzullaev 73'; Reimov 80'	Report	Meriño 62'

CS Asset Minato Soccer Stadium, Nagoya
Attendance: 306
Referee: Jin Jingyuan (China)

18 September 2026
15:30

Philippines	0–2	Vietnam
	Report	Nguyễn Thanh Nhàn 74'; Nguyễn Lê Phát 88'

CS Asset Minato Soccer Stadium, Nagoya
Attendance: 513
Referee: Hiroki Kasahara (Japan)

22 September 2026
14:00

Philippines	2–1	Kuwait
Rublico 19'; Aldeguer 90+1' (pen.)	Report	Woods 66' (o.g.)

CS Asset Minato Soccer Stadium, Nagoya
Attendance: 682
Referee: Songkran Bunmeekiart (Thailand)

=== Women's tournament ===
Team roster

The following 23 players were named to the squad for the 2026 Asian Games. Angela Beard, Téa Pidding and Gabrielle Rourke withdrew from the squad and were replaced by Charisa Lemoran, Janly Fontamillas and Leah Bradley.

Head Coach: (Australia) Mark Torcaso

No.	Pos.	Player	Date of birth (age)	Club
1	GK	Olivia McDaniel	14 October 1997 (age 29)	Free agent
18	GK	Nina Meollo	23 June 2004 (age 22)	Free agent
22	GK	Leah Bradley	7 April 2009 (age 17)	(United States Soccer Federation) Liberty Lady Flames
2	DF	Reina Bonta	17 April 1999 (age 27)	Free agent
3	DF	Azumi Oka	21 April 2006 (age 20)	(United States Soccer Federation) UNCG Spartans
5	DF	Hali Long	21 January 1995 (age 31)	(Football Association of Thailand) BGC–College of Asian Scholars
12	DF	Kaya Hawkinson	17 April 2000 (age 26)	Free agent
13	DF	Janly Fontamillas	24 January 2000 (age 26)	(Philippine Football Federation) Kaya–Iloilo
14	DF	Jourdyn Curran	11 May 2003 (age 23)	(United States Soccer Federation) Salmon Bay
16	DF	Sofia Wunsch	16 February 1999 (age 27)	Free agent
17	DF	Aiselyn Sia	23 February 2009 (age 17)	(United States Soccer Federation) Illinois Fighting Illini
4	MF	Charisa Lemoran	21 September 1998 (age 28)	(Philippine Football Federation) Kaya–Iloilo
6	MF	Jaclyn Sawicki	14 November 1992 (age 33)	(Canadian Soccer Association) Calgary Wild
7	MF	Natalie Collins	28 May 2007 (age 19)	(United States Soccer Federation) Boise State Broncos
8	MF	Skye Leach	8 October 2003 (age 23)	(Football Australia) Melbourne Victory
9	MF	Carleigh Frilles	11 April 2002 (age 24)	(United States Soccer Federation) DC Power
15	MF	Isabella Pasion	14 July 2006 (age 20)	Free agent
19	MF	Alessandrea Carpio	4 April 2002 (age 24)	(Philippine Football Federation) Kaya–Iloilo
20	MF	Camryn Penn	15 October 2004 (age 22)	(United States Soccer Federation) Cal Poly Mustangs
21	MF	Katrina Guillou	19 December 1993 (age 32)	(United States Soccer Federation) DC Power
23	MF	Megan Murray	23 November 2005 (age 20)	(United States Soccer Federation) Marquette Golden Eagles
10	FW	Mallie Ramirez	1 September 2004 (age 22)	Free agent
11	FW	Dionesa Tolentin	25 June 2000 (age 26)	(Philippine Football Federation) Kaya–Iloilo

Preliminary rounds – Group G

Pos	Team	Pld	W	D	L	GF	GA	GD	Pts	Qualification
1	China	3	2	1	0	11	3	+8	7	Advance to knockout stage
2	Uzbekistan	3	1	2	0	4	3	+1	5	Advance to knockout stage
3	Philippines	3	1	1	1	4	6	−2	4	Advance to knockout stage
4	Hong Kong	3	0	0	3	2	9	−7	0	

Source: Aichi–Nagoya 26
14 September 2026
14:00

Philippines	1–1	Uzbekistan
Collins 89'	Report	Egamberdieva 81'

Gifu Nagaragawa Stadium, Gifu
Attendance: 202
Referee: Lê Thị Ly (Vietnam)

17 September 2026
19:00

Hong Kong	0–2	Philippines
	Report	Leach 12'; Ramirez 63'

Gifu Nagaragawa Stadium, Gifu
Attendance: 189
Referee: Haneen Murad (Jordan)

21 September 2026
16:00

China	5–1	Philippines
Wang Yanwen 20', 40', 54'; Chen Qiaozhu 49'; Yuan Cong 90+2'	Report	Leach 65'

Gifu Nagaragawa Stadium, Gifu
Attendance: 1,022
Referee: Esraa Almbaiden (Jordan)

Quarterfinals

25 September 2026
19:30

Japan	4–0	Philippines
Takarada 2', 36'; Ueno 26'; Kamiya 45+2'	Report

Shizuoka Stadium, Fukuroi
Attendance: 1,084
Referee: Esraa Al-Mbaiden (Jordan)

== Golf ==
Men

Athlete	Event	Round 1	Round 2	Round 3	Round 4	Total	Par	Rank
Carl Corpus	Individual	69	72	77	66	284	+4	=31
Justin De los Santos	Individual	68	67	71	71	277	–3	=15
Miguel Tabuena	Individual	70	70	71	71	282	+2	=27
Carl Corpus; Justin De los Santos; Miguel Tabuena	Team	137	137	142	137	553	–7	9

Women

Athlete	Event	Round 1	Round 2	Round 3	Round 4	Total	Par	Rank
Pauline del Rosario	Individual	78	73	Cut	Cut	226	+16	Cut
Rianne Malixi	Individual	70	66	71	67	274	–6	=5
Bianca Pagdanganan	Individual	67	74	71	71	283	+3	=15
Pauline del Rosario; Rianne Malixi; Bianca Pagdanganan	Team	137	139	142	138	556	–4	8

== Gymnastics ==
The Philippines plans to send a five-man artistic gymnastics team to the 2026 Asian Games.

Gymnastics emerged as this delegation's best-performing sport courtesy of Carlos Yulo's triumphs at the floor exercise and vault finals. His younger brother Eldrew secured a bronze medal at the horizontal bar final in his debut Asiad.

=== Artistic ===
==== Men's ====
Team

Athlete	Event	Qualification								Final							
Athlete	Event	Apparatus						Total	Rank	Apparatus						Total	Rank
Athlete	Event	F	PH	R	V	PB	HB	Total	Rank	F	PH	R	V	PB	HB	Total	Rank
Miguel Besana	Team	13.133	8.966	~~10.900~~	14.066	~~11.233~~	12.600	—N/a		—N/a	11.933	—N/a		10.000	11.733	—N/a	
Justine de Leon	Team	~~13.066~~	—N/a	12.433	13.666	—N/a		—N/a		10.933	—N/a	12.533	13.833	—N/a		—N/a	
Zachary Nuñez	Team	—N/a	13.566	—N/a		11.800	12.233	—N/a		—N/a	12.333	—N/a			12.066	—N/a	
Carlos Yulo	Team	14.600	~~8.233~~	13.500	~~13.166~~	14.266	~~11.700~~	—N/a		14.266	—N/a	13.333	14.566	14.166	—N/a	—N/a	
Eldrew Yulo	Team	13.966	11.733	11.666	14.300	12.166	13.433	—N/a		13.000	11.366	12.233	13.966	11.933	13.166	—N/a	
Total	Team	41.699	34.265	37.599	42.032	38.232	38.266	232.093	6 Q	38.199	35.632	38.099	42.365	36.099	36.965	227.359	6

Individual events

Athlete	Event	Qualification								Final							
Athlete	Event	Apparatus						Total	Rank	Apparatus						Total	Rank
Athlete	Event	F	PH	R	V	PB	HB	Total	Rank	F	PH	R	V	PB	HB	Total	Rank
Miguel Besana	Vault	—N/a			13.933	—N/a		13.933	4 Q	—N/a			13.783	—N/a		13.783	5
Carlos Yulo	All-around	—N/a								See team results above						75.465	9
Carlos Yulo	Floor	14.600	—N/a					14.600	1 Q	14.666	—N/a					14.666	1st place, gold medalist(s)
Carlos Yulo	Vault	—N/a			13.166	—N/a		13.166	7 Q	—N/a			14.599	—N/a		14.599	1st place, gold medalist(s)
Carlos Yulo	Parallel bars	—N/a				14.266	—N/a	14.266	6 Q	—N/a				14.300	—N/a	14.300	4
Eldrew Yulo	All-around	—N/a								See team results above						77.264	7
Eldrew Yulo	Floor	13.966	—N/a					13.966	4 Q	12.233	—N/a					12.233	7
Eldrew Yulo	Horizontal bar	—N/a					13.433	13.433	9 Q	—N/a					13.666	13.666	3rd place, bronze medalist(s)

==== Women's ====
Team

Athlete	Event	Qualification						Final					
Athlete	Event	Apparatus				Total	Rank	Apparatus				Total	Rank
Athlete	Event	V	UB	B	F	Total	Rank	V	UB	B	F	Total	Rank
Chiara Andrew	Team	—N/a			~~11.800~~	—N/a		12.700	11.366	—N/a		—N/a	
Haylee Garcia	Team	12.900	~~9.566~~	12.000	11.933	—N/a			10.100	—N/a		—N/a	
Kylee Kvamme	Team	13.466	10.100	11.866	12.233	—N/a		13.300	—N/a	13.633	11.833	—N/a	
Lauren Supnet	Team	12.866	9.800	~~10.800~~	—N/a			12.900	—N/a	11.000	11.166	—N/a	
Levi Ruivivar	Team	~~12.666~~	13.166	11.333	12.900	—N/a			13.766	12.866	13.133	—N/a	
Total	Team	39.232	33.066	35.199	37.066	144.563	7 Q	38.900	35.232	37.499	36.132	147.763	6

Individual events

Athlete	Event	Qualification						Final					
Athlete	Event	Apparatus				Total	Rank	Apparatus				Total	Rank
Athlete	Event	V	UB	B	F	Total	Rank	V	UB	B	F	Total	Rank
Haylee Garcia	Vault	12.766	—N/a			12.766	11 R	Did not advance					
Kylee Kvamme	All-around	—N/a						See team results above				47.665	12
Levi Ruivivar	All-around	—N/a						See team results above				50.065	10
Levi Ruivivar	Uneven bars	—N/a	13.166	—N/a		13.166	12 R	Did not advance					
Levi Ruivivar	Floor	—N/a			12.900	12.900	15 R	Did not advance					

=== Rhythmic ===
Athlete	Event	Qualification						Final					
Athlete	Event	Hoop	Ball	Clubs	Ribbon	Total	Rank	Hoop	Ball	Clubs	Ribbon	Total	Rank
Breanna Labadan	All-around	25.850	25.300	25.750	21.100	98.000	10 Q	25.650	25.500	25.100	19.200	95.450	10
Jasmine Ramilo	All-around	24.850	24.150	24.100	24.350	97.450	13 R	Did not advance					

=== Trampoline ===
Athlete	Event	Qualification		Final	
Athlete	Event	Score	Rank	Score	Rank
Jerry Ilano Jr.	Men's trampoline	47.00	11	Did not advance	
Luvicar Padilla	Women's trampoline	21.38	10	Did not advance	

== Judo ==
Men's

Athlete	Event	Round of 16	Quarterfinals	Semifinals	Repechage	Final	Rank
Athlete	Event	Opposition Result	Opposition Result	Opposition Result	Opposition Result	Opposition Result	Rank
Daryl Mercado	60 kg	Kondo (JPN); L 00–10	Did not advance				
Keisei Nakano	66 kg	Nutfulloev (UZB); L 00s2–10s1	Did not advance				
Gabriel Quitain	73 kg	Terada (THA); W 10s2–00H	Asadulloev (TJK); L 00s2–10	Did not advance	Aloev (BHR); L 0s2–1s1	Did not advance	
Chino Sy Tancontian	100 kg	Masuchi (JPN); L 000–101	Did not advance				
Eskelen Kedo	+100 kg	Magomedomadov (UAE); L 000–111	Did not advance				

Women's

Athlete	Event	Round of 16	Quarterfinals	Semifinals	Repechage	Final	Rank
Athlete	Event	Opposition Result	Opposition Result	Opposition Result	Opposition Result	Opposition Result	Rank
Joemari Rafael	57 kg	Huh (KOR); L 00–10	Did not advance				
Khrizzie Pabulayan	70 kg	Kochkonbaeva (KGZ); L 00s1–01	Did not advance				
Kiyomi Watanabe	78 kg	Tokareva (KAZ) L 0s1–100s1	Did not advance				

== Ju-jitsu ==
Men

Athlete	Event	1/32 Finals	1/16 Finals	1/8 Finals	1/4 Finals / Repechage	Final of Tables / Repechage 2	Final	Rank
Athlete	Event	Opposition Result	Opposition Result	Opposition Result	Opposition Result	Opposition Result	Opposition Result	Rank
Santino Luis Luzuriaga	62 kg	—N/a	Batsuuri (MGL); L 0–2	Did not advance				
Myron Mangubat	62 kg	—N/a	Rakhmonberdiev (UZB); L 2–4	Did not advance				
Marc Alexander Lim	69 kg	—N/a	Choijamts (MGL); W ADV 2–2	Dang (VIE); W 2–0	Batyrbekov (KAZ); L 2–4	Tianguber (KGZ); W ADV 2–2	Joo S-h (KOR); L ADV 2–2	5
Yman Xavier Baluyo	69 kg	Ashkanani (KUW); L 0–4	Did not advance					
Antonio Luigi Dy	77 kg	—N/a	Munkhtur (MGL); L 0–3	Did not advance				
Mark Vergel	77 kg	—N/a	Bulgankhuu (MGL); L 0–2	Did not advance				
Vito Luis Luzuriaga	85 kg	—N/a	Bayarkhuu (MGL); L 4–7	Did not advance				
David Miranda	85 kg	—N/a	Batsukh (MGL); L SUB 0–50	Did not advance				
Romeo Arellano	94 kg	—N/a		Baasandorj (MGL); W 6–2	Taherkhani (IRI); L ADV 0–0	Alhosani (UAE); L 0–2	Did not advance	

Women

Athlete	Event	1/16 Finals	1/8 Finals	1/4 Finals	Final of Tables / Repechage	Final	Rank
Athlete	Event	Opposition Result	Opposition Result	Opposition Result	Opposition Result	Opposition Result	Rank
Jollirine Co	48 kg	Tanaka (JPN); W SUB 50–0	Kulumbetova (KAZ); L ADV 0–0	Did not advance			
Kimberly Custodio	48 kg	—N/a	Abdulla (UAE); L ADV 0–0	Did not advance			
Kaila Napolis	52 kg	—N/a	Trần T.T.H. (VIE); W 2–0	Ganbaatar (MGL); L 0–2	Sofia Anabel (INA); W 2–0	Altangerel (MGL); W 2–0	3rd place, bronze medalist(s)
Annie Ramirez	52 kg	—N/a	Singchalad (THA); L ADV 0–0	Did not advance			
Alex Enriquez	63 kg	Bye	Obaid (JOR); W SUB 50–0	Zhuravleva (KAZ); W SUB 50–0	Baasanjargal (MGL); W SUB 50–0	Senatham (THA); L ADV 0–0	2nd place, silver medalist(s)
Andrea Lois Lao	63 kg	Enkhbaatar (MGL); W SUB 50–0	Salykova (KAZ); W ADV 0–0	Senatham (THA); L SUB 0–50	Sung K-r (KOR); W WO	Baasanjargal (MGL); L 0–2	5

== Karate ==
Key:

• K - Kiken (Forfeiture)

=== Men ===
Athlete	Event	1/16 Finals	1/8 Finals	Quarterfinals	Repechage	Semifinals / Repechage 2	Finals	Rank
Athlete	Event	Opposition Result	Opposition Result	Opposition Result	Opposition Result	Opposition Result	Opposition Result	Rank
John Lachica	Kumite -60 kg	Park G-h (KOR); W 2–1	Gurbanmyradow (TKM); L 1–6	Did not advance				
Alwyn Batican	Kumite -75 kg	Bye	Al-Jenaei (KUW) (K) W 3–3	Xu J.C. (MAC); W 5–4	—N/a	Nemati (IRI); L 2–8	Azhikanov (KAZ); L 1–10	5

=== Women ===
Athlete	Event	1/16 Finals	1/8 Finals	Quarterfinals	Repechage	Semifinals / Repechage 2	Finals	Rank
Athlete	Event	Opposition Result	Opposition Result	Opposition Result	Opposition Result	Opposition Result	Opposition Result	Rank
Rebecca Cyril Torres	Individual kata	—N/a	Al-Saied (KUW); W 3–2	Chien H-hs (TPE); L 1–4	Did not advance			
Ysabielle Arrogante; Rebecca Cyril Torres; Emmanuelle Vegullas	Team kata	—N/a		Cambodia (CAM); W 5–0	—N/a	Iran (IRI); L 0–5	Thailand (THA); W 4–1	3rd place, bronze medalist(s)
Marie June Adriano	Kumite -50 kg	—N/a	Chonn (CAM); W 4–3	Yang Y-w (KOR); W 4–0	—N/a	Tsang Y.T. (HKG); L 4–5	Chung Y-ch (TPE); W 10–3	3rd place, bronze medalist(s)

== Kurash ==
Men

Athlete	Event	Round of 32	Round of 16	Quarterfinals	Semifinals	Final	Rank
Athlete	Event	Opposition Result	Opposition Result	Opposition Result	Opposition Result	Opposition Result	Rank
Jackielou Escarpe	66 kg	Bye	Najmi (AFG); L 0–10	Did not advance			
Nick Gabriel Ligero	66 kg	Yoon H-s (KOR); L 0–10	Did not advance				
Czar Augustus Bayas	81 kg	—N/a	Ehsani (AFG); L 0–10	Did not advance			

Women

Athlete	Event	Round of 32	Round of 16	Quarterfinals	Semifinals	Final	Rank
Athlete	Event	Opposition Result	Opposition Result	Opposition Result	Opposition Result	Opposition Result	Rank
Myrina Ladjahasan	57 kg	Jumadurdyýewa (TKM); L 0–3	Did not advance				
Charmea Quelino	57 kg	Sangita (IND); W 10–0	Eidivandi (IRI); W 5–0	Lee W-t (TPE); L 0–3	Did not advance		
Margaret Fajardo	78 kg	—N/a	Lim G-r (KOR); L 0–5	Did not advance			

== Mixed martial arts ==
Athlete	Event	Round of 16	Quarterfinals	Semifinals	Final	
Athlete	Event	Opposition Score	Opposition Score	Opposition Score	Opposition Score	Rank
Jean Claude Saclag	Men's 65 kg	Bye	Al-Molhem (KSA); W 3–0	Murayama (JPN); W 3–0	Rajabov (TJK); L 0–3	2nd place, silver medalist(s)
Carlos Alvarez	Men's 77 kg	Bye	Prabowo (INA); W 3–0	Berkutalin (KAZ); L 0–3	Did not advance	3rd place, bronze medalist(s)
Gina Araos	Women's 54 kg	Bye	Phattaraboonsorn (THA); L 0–3	Did not advance		

== Modern pentathlon ==
The Philippines have qualified six athletes for modern pentathlon; four males and two females.

Individual events

Athlete	Event	Ranking Round		Semifinals										Final									
Athlete	Event	Fencing (épée one touch)				Obstacle		Swimming		Laser Run		Total points	Rank	Fencing		Obstacle		Swimming		Laser Run		Total	Rank
Athlete	Event	Wins	Seed	MP Points	Rank	MP Points	Rank	MP Points	Rank	MP Points	Rank	Total points	Rank	MP	Rank	MP	Rank	MP	Rank	MP	Rank	Total	Rank
Gilbert Andrino	Men	17	22	212	12	378	2	269	17	634	1	1,493	10	Did not advance									
Michael Ver Comaling	Men	18	20	216	10	364	9	312	9	607	6	1,499	9 Q	198	17	320	16	290	17	600	18	1,408	17
Samuel German	Men	24	5	238	3	386	1	247	15	597	6	1,468	9 Q	244	2	387	1	246	18	608	16	1,485	15
Joseph Anthony Godbout	Men	19	18	214	11	343	11	279	13	593	8	1,429	11	Did not advance									
Shyra Mae Aranzado	Women	16	18	214	11	307	12	241	12	540	2	1,302	10	Did not advance									
Princess Honey Arbilon	Women	22	7	236	4	309	11	215	15	526	3	1,286	11	Did not advance									
Juliana Shane Sevilla	Women	15	19	224	8	339	6	178	15	547	2	1288	10	Did not advance									

Team events

Athlete	Event						
Athlete	Event	Fencing	Obstacle	Swimming	Laser Run	Total	Rank
Gilbert Andrino; Michael Comaling; Samuel German	Men	654	1,085	805	1,842	4,386	5
Shyra Mae Aranzado; Princess Honey Arbilon; Juliana Shane Sevilla	Women	674	955	634	1,613	3,876	6

== Padel ==
Athlete	Event	Round of 32	Round of 16	Quarterfinals	Semifinals	Final / BM	
Athlete	Event	Opposition Result	Opposition Result	Opposition Result	Opposition Result	Opposition Result	Rank
Abdulqoafar Allian; Raymark Gulfo	Men's pairs	Bye	Alabdulla; Al Janahi (UAE); L 0–2	Did not advance			
Argil Canizares; Jason Lapidus	Men's pairs	Edison; Soemarno (INA); W 2–0	Chau K. Lo L. (HKG); W 2–0	Chin; Aidan Yunus (MAS); L 1–2	Did not advance		
Danna Abad; Joshea Malazarte	Women's pairs	Alabdullatif; Kurdi (KSA); W 2–0	Chan W. Lau H. (HKG); W 2–1	Najafi Dehaghi; Mohammad Taghipour (IRI); W 2–1	Sabatini; Kusumawati (INA); L 0–2	Putria; Gumulya (INA); L 0–2	4
Marian Capadocia; Tao Tan	Women's pairs	Khabibulina; Sinitsyna (KAZ); W 2–1	Chan H. Law Y. (HKG); L 1–2	Did not advance			

== Rowing ==
=== Men's ===
Athlete	Event	Heats		Final	
Athlete	Event	Time	Rank	Time	Rank
Cris Nievarez	Single sculls	6:59.66	7 FB	DNS	
Edgar Ilias	Lightweight single sculls	7:55.58	9 FB	7:23.78	3 FB3
Van Adrian Maxilom; Rynjie Peñaredondo	Coxless pair	7:06.69	9 FB	7:06.94	2 FB2

=== Women's ===
Athlete	Event	Heats		Final	
Athlete	Event	Time	Rank	Time	Rank
Joanie Delgaco	Single sculls	8:25.47	6 FA	8:01.63	6

== Rugby sevens ==
Team	Event	Group Stage				Quarterfinals	Semifinals / PM	Final / PM	
Team	Event	Opposition Score	Opposition Score	Opposition Score	Rank	Opposition Score	Opposition Score	Opposition Score	Rank
Philippines men's	Men's tournament	Sri Lanka; L 14–22	United Arab Emirates; D 17–17	Singapore; W 31–12	3	Japan; L 7–28	Sri Lanka; W 33–12	Malaysia; L 7–34	6

== Sailing ==
Individual

Athlete	Event	Race											Total Points	Net Points (Note: The lowest score is excluded for calculating the net points)	Rank
Athlete	Event	1	2	3	4	5	6	7	8	9	10	11	Total Points	Net Points	Rank
Dhenver Jon Castillo	Boys' iQFoil	2	(7); DNS	4	5	(6)	3	6	4	2	5	3	47	34	4
John Harold Madrigal	Men's iQFoil	(7); DNF	4	4	(6)	6	6	6	6	6	6	6	63	50	8
Kelsy Loryn Moreno	Girls' iQFoil	(6)	5	5	(6)	5	6	6	6	5	4	4	58	46	6
Arrianne Paz	Women's iQFoil	3	4	5	(6)	5	5	6	5	4	5	—N/a	48	42	5

Team

Athlete	Event	Race										Total Points	Net Points	Rank
Athlete	Event	1	2	3	4	5	6	7	8	9	10	Total Points	Net Points	Rank
Khim Ashley Albo; Ronello Castillo III	Mixed youth 420	5	4	4	3	3	4	4	(6)	6	6	45	37	6
Coleen Jem Ferrer; Edgar Villapaña	Mixed 470	4	7	4	(8)	4	7	5	7	7	7	60	52	6

== Sepak takraw ==
Men

Athlete	Event	Group Stage				Semifinals	Final	
Athlete	Event	Opposition score	Opposition score	Opposition score	Rank	Opposition score	Opposition score	Rank
Reynaldo Asilum Jr. Ronsited Gabayeron; Jason Huerte; Glindel Phori; Jom Lerry Rafael	Regu	Thailand (THA); L 0–2	Japan (JPN); W 2–0	—N/a	2 Q	Malaysia (MAS); L 1–2	Did not advance	3rd place, bronze medalist(s)
Welmar Aclan; Reynaldo Asilum Jr. Marc Kian Jake Fuentes; Ronsited Gabayeron; Mark Joseph Gonzales; Jason Huerte; Datu Ken Interino; Jerry Loquinario Jr. Rheyjey Ortouste; Glindel Phori; Jom Lerry Rafael; Vince Alyson Torno	Team regu	Malaysia (MAS); L 0–3	Japan (JPN); W 2–1	India (IND); L 1–2	4	Did not advance		

Women

Athlete	Event	Group Stage				Semifinals	Final	
Athlete	Event	Opposition score	Opposition score	Opposition score	Rank	Opposition score	Opposition score	Rank
Nelly Jay Salon; Abegail Sinogbuhan; Jean Marie Sucalit	Doubles	Japan (JPN); W 2–1	India (IND); W 2–0	South Korea (KOR); L 1–2	2 Q	Laos (LAO); W 2–0	Vietnam (VIE); L 0–2	2nd place, silver medalist(s)
Khyhan Jhayca Cajilig; Rhea Mae De la Cruz; Kristine Lapsit; Mary Ann Lopez; Rachelle Palomar; Nieva Jane Salon	Quadrant	India (IND); W 2–1	Thailand (THA); L 0–2	Vietnam (VIE); L 0–2	3	Did not advance		

== Shooting ==
Men

Athlete	Event	Qualification		Final	
Athlete	Event	Score	Rank	Score	Rank
Eric Ang	Trap	109	29	Did not advance	
Enrique Enriquez	Skeet	108	35	Did not advance	
Michael Angelo Fernandez	10m air pistol	568-13x	36	Did not advance	
Antonio Javines	Trap	108	30	Did not advance	
Timothy Poblete	10m air pistol	553-4x	58.	Did not advance	
Paul Rosario	Skeet	DNS		Did not advance	
Hagen Topacio	Trap	111	25	Did not advance	
Carlo Deniel Valdez	10 m air pistol	570-15x	31	Did not advance	
Jayson Valdez	10 m air rifle	618.1	35	Did not advance	
Jayson Valdez	50 m rifle 3 positions	561-14x	39	Did not advance	
Michael Angelo Fernandez; Timothy Poblete; Carlo Deniel Valdez	10 m air pistol team	—N/a		1691-32x	13
Eric Ang; Antonio Javines; Hagen Topacio	Trap team	—N/a		328	8

Women

Athlete	Event	Qualification		Final	
Athlete	Event	Score	Rank	Score	Rank
Amparo Acuña	10 m air rifle	620.5	42	Did not advance	
Amparo Acuña	50 m rifle 3 positions	579-25x	31	Did not advance	
Franchette Quiroz	10 m air pistol	555-10x	44	Did not advance	
Franchette Quiroz	25 m pistol	567-9x	35	Did not advance	

Mixed

Athlete	Event	Qualification		Final	
Athlete	Event	Score	Rank	Score	Rank
Michael Angelo Fernandez; Franchette Quiroz	10 m air pistol team	561-8x	17	Did not advance	

== Skateboarding ==
=== Men's ===
Athlete	Event	Preliminary		Finals	
Athlete	Event	Result	Rank	Result	Rank
Kiko Francisco	Park	80.64	4 Q	84.41	4
Renzo Mark Feliciano	Street	97.93	9	Did not advance	
Renz Gelig	Street	97.56	10	Did not advance	

=== Women's ===
Athlete	Event	Preliminary		Finals	
Athlete	Event	Result	Rank	Result	Rank
Mazel Paris Alegado	Park	73.93	4 Q	80.65	5
Elizabeth Amador	Park	59.99	9	Did not advance	

== Softball ==
The Philippines women's national softball team qualified for the 2026 Asian Games by finishing among the top eight teams in the 2025 Women's Softball Asia Cup in Xi'an, China.

Team	Group Stage								Final / BM	
Team	Opposition Score	Opposition Score	Opposition Score	Opposition Score	Opposition Score	Opposition Score	Opposition Score	Rank	Opposition Score	Rank
Philippines women's	Japan; L 0–10	Chinese Taipei; L 1–10	South Korea; W 7–3	Thailand; W 7–0	Singapore; W 10–0	China; L 0–7	Hong Kong; W 9–3	4	Chinese Taipei; L 2–12	4

Preliminary Rounds

Pos	Team	Pld	W	L	RF	RA	PCT	GB	Qualification
1	Japan (H)	7	7	0	69	8	1.000	—	Gold medal
2	China	7	6	1	66	17	.857	1	Gold medal
3	Chinese Taipei	7	5	2	68	17	.714	2	Bronze medal
4	Philippines	7	4	3	34	33	.571	3	Bronze medal
5	South Korea	7	3	4	31	36	.429	4	
6	Hong Kong	7	2	5	20	60	.286	5	
7	Singapore	7	1	6	15	57	.143	6	
8	Thailand	7	0	7	7	82	.000	7	

Updated to match(es) played on 2026-10-02. Source: asiangames2026.org
(H) Hosts

26 September; 16:30	Philippines	0–10	Japan	Anjō Sports Park Softball Ground, Anjō; Umpires: Foo Lai Meng (SGP)
26 September; 16:30	LP: Royevel Palma	Boxscore	WP: Mio Sakamoto	Anjō Sports Park Softball Ground, Anjō; Umpires: Foo Lai Meng (SGP)

Team	1	2	3	4	5	6	7	R	H	E
Philippines	0	0	0	0	—	—	—	0	2	3
Japan	0	9	0	1	—	—	—	10	10	0

27 September; 11:30	Philippines	1–10	Chinese Taipei	Anjō Sports Park Softball Ground, Anjō; Umpires: Koji Ogawa (JPN)
27 September; 11:30	LP: Mary Joy Alpitche	Boxscore	WP: Tu Ya-ting	Anjō Sports Park Softball Ground, Anjō; Umpires: Koji Ogawa (JPN)

Team	1	2	3	4	5	6	7	R	H	E
Philippines	1	0	0	0	0	—	—	1	5	2
Chinese Taipei	1	3	6	0	X	—	—	10	9	1

28 September; 10:30	Singapore	2–9	Chinese Taipei	Anjō Sports Park Softball Ground, Anjō; Umpires: Cho Hee-young (KOR)
28 September; 10:30	LP: Koh Rui Wen Adelia	Boxscore	WP: Chu Yi-shan	Anjō Sports Park Softball Ground, Anjō; Umpires: Cho Hee-young (KOR)

Team	1	2	3	4	5	6	7	R	H	E
Singapore	0	0	1	0	1	—	—	2	6	1
Chinese Taipei	0	1	6	1	1	—	—	9	10	0

29 September; 11:30	Philippines	7–0	Thailand	Anjō Sports Park Softball Ground, Anjō; Umpires: Pan Chih Ming (TPE)
29 September; 11:30	WP: Mary Joy Alpitche	Boxscore	LP: Nessara Utthong	Anjō Sports Park Softball Ground, Anjō; Umpires: Pan Chih Ming (TPE)

Team	1	2	3	4	5	6	7	R	H	E
Philippines	0	2	3	1	1	—	—	7	8	0
Thailand	0	0	0	0	0	—	—	0	2	2

30 September; 18:15	Philippines	10–0	Singapore	Anjō Sports Park Softball Ground, Anjō; Umpires: Mari Jinno (JPN)
30 September; 18:15	WP: Mary Joy Alpitche	Boxscore	LP: Koh Rui Wen Adelia	Anjō Sports Park Softball Ground, Anjō; Umpires: Mari Jinno (JPN)

Team	1	2	3	4	5	6	7	R	H	E
Philippines	6	1	3	0	—	—	—	10	12	1
Singapore	0	0	0	0	—	—	—	0	1	1

1 October; 11:20	Philippines	0–7	China	Anjō Sports Park Softball Ground, Anjō; Umpires: Ayaka Sasajima (JPN)
1 October; 11:20	LP: Glory Alonzo	Boxscore	WP: Chai Yinan	Anjō Sports Park Softball Ground, Anjō; Umpires: Ayaka Sasajima (JPN)

Team	1	2	3	4	5	6	7	R	H	E
Philippines	0	0	0	0	0	—	—	0	2	0
China	0	1	2	0	4	—	—	7	8	1

2 October; 9:00	Philippines	9–3	Hong Kong	Anjō Sports Park Softball Ground, Anjō; Umpires: Norikazu Hamasaki (JPN)
2 October; 9:00	WP: Royevel Palma	Boxscore	LP: Lau Suet Man	Anjō Sports Park Softball Ground, Anjō; Umpires: Norikazu Hamasaki (JPN)

Team	1	2	3	4	5	6	7	R	H	E
Philippines	1	5	1	0	2	0	0	9	10	1
Hong Kong	0	0	3	0	0	0	0	3	8	3

== Soft tennis ==
The five-player women's team earned a bronze medal, the Philippines' first ever medal in soft tennis since the sport was introduced in the 1998 Asian Games.

=== Singles ===
Athlete	Event	Group stage			Quarterfinals	Semifinals	Final	
Athlete	Event	Opposition Score	Opposition Score	Rank	Opposition Score	Opposition Score	Opposition Score	Rank
Joseph Arcilla	Men's	Khatri (NEP); W 4–0	Lee H-n (KOR); L 1–4	2	Did not advance			
Sherwin Nuguit	Men's	Vongphakdy (LAO); W 4–2	Falevi (INA); W 4–3	1 Q	Meena (IND); L 3–4	Did not advance		
Princess Cantindig	Women's	Nafiia (INA); L 1–4	Ri S.H. (PRK); L 1–4	3	Did not advance			
Christy Sañosa	Women's	Zaidi (PAK); W 4–0	Miyamae (JPN); L 1–4	2	Did not advance			

=== Doubles ===
Athlete	Event	Group stage			First Round	Quarterfinals	Semifinals	Final	
Athlete	Event	Opposition Score	Opposition Score	Rank	Opposition Score	Opposition Score	Opposition Score	Opposition Score	Rank
Noelle Mañalac; Samuel Nuguit	Mixed	Arain; Shallwani (PAK); W 5–0	Kim H-s; Lee S-j (KOR); L 2–5	2 Q	Kim Y-h; Park J-k (KOR); L 0–5	Did not advance			
Sherwin Nuguit; Christy Sañosa	Mixed	Temma; Uematsu (JPN); L 0–5	Bye	2 Q	Meena; Tiwari (IND); W 5–2	Hwang Sh-y; Yu K-w (TPE); L 0–5	Did not advance		

=== Team ===
Athlete	Event	Group stage				Quarterfinals	Semifinals	Final	
Athlete	Event	Opposition Score	Opposition Score	Opposition Score	Rank	Opposition Score	Opposition Score	Opposition Score	Rank
Mark Alcoseba; Joseph Arcilla; Samuel Nuguit; Sherwin Nuguit; Dheo Talatayod	Men's	Pakistan (PAK); W 3–0	Japan (JPN); L 0–3	Cambodia (CAM); W 3–0	2 Q	South Korea (KOR); L 0–2	Did not advance		
Princess Catindig; Noelle Mañalac; Hilary Paas; Shyryn Salazar; Christy Sañosa	Women's	Mongolia (MGL); W 3–0	Thailand (THA); W 2–1	Chinese Taipei (TPE); L 0–3	2 Q	—N/a	Japan (JPN); L 0–2	Did not advance	3rd place, bronze medalist(s)

== Squash ==
=== Singles ===
Athlete	Event	Round of 64	Round of 32	Round of 16	Quarterfinals	Semifinals	Final	
Athlete	Event	Opposition Score	Opposition Score	Opposition Score	Opposition Score	Opposition Score	Opposition Score	Rank
Reymark Begornia	Men's	Yingcharoen (THA); W 3–1	NG (MAS); L 0–3	Did not advance				
Van Dalida	Men's	Bye	Zaman (PAK); L 0–3	Did not advance				

=== Doubles ===
Athlete	Event	Round of 32	Round of 16	Quarterfinals	Semifinals	Final	
Athlete	Event	Opposition Score	Opposition Score	Opposition Score	Opposition Score	Opposition Score	Rank
Jemyca Aribado; David Pelino	Mixed	Bye	Eom H-y; Lee M-w (KOR); W 2–0	Chinappa; Senthilkumar (IND); L 0–2	Did not advance		
Yvonne Dalida; Jonathan Reyes	Mixed	Shi Y. Cheng L. (CHN); W 2–0	Oh S-j; Heo M-g (KOR); L 0–2	Did not advance			

=== Team ===
Athlete	Event	Group stage			Quarterfinals	Semifinals	Final	
Athlete	Event	Opposition Score	Opposition Score	Rank	Opposition Score	Opposition Score	Opposition Score	Rank
Reymark Begornia; Van Aero Dalida; David Pelino; Jonathan Reyes	Men's	Pakistan (PAK); L 0–3	Kuwait (KUW); L 0–3	3	Did not advance			

== Surfing ==
Athlete	Event	Round 1		Round 2	Round 3	Quarterfinals	Semifinals	Final / BM	
Athlete	Event	Score	Rank	Opposition Result	Opposition Result	Opposition Result	Opposition Result	Opposition Result	Rank
Jayuard Alciso	Men's shortboard	9.20	8	—N/a	Babu (IND); W 11.50–7.83	Palmiano (KOR); W 10.76–7.24	Ariyana (INA); L 12.37–13.60	Espejon (PHI); W 11.64–8.90	3rd place, bronze medalist(s)
Toby Espejon	Men's shortboard	10.33	3	—N/a	Wehle (MAS); W 11.83–6.34	Anbarasu (IND); W 8.53–5.37	Igarashi (JPN); L 5.83–18.33	Alciso (PHI); L 8.90–11.64	4
Nilbie Blancada	Women's shortboard	9.40	5	—N/a	Española (PHI); L 10.00–10.20	Did not advance			
Juralyn Española	Women's shortboard	10.94	2	—N/a	Blancada (PHI); W 10.20–10.00	Studer (INA); L 6.64–10.67	Did not advance		

== Swimming ==
=== Men's ===
Athlete	Event	Heats		Final	
Athlete	Event	Time	Rank	Time	Rank
Logan Noguchi	50m butterfly	24.56	18	Did not advance	
Logan Noguchi	50m freestyle	23.08	23	Did not advance	
Logan Noguchi	100m butterfly	54.57	16	Did not advance	
Logan Noguchi	100m freestyle	50.61	13	Did not advance	
Gian Santos	200m breaststroke	2:14.89	14	Did not advance	
Gian Santos	200m freestyle	1:49.34 NR	8 Q	1:49.80	10
Gian Santos	200m individual medley	2:02.20	12	Did not advance	
Gian Santos	400m freestyle	3:56.27	12	Did not advance	
Gian Santos	400m individual medley	4:24.25	8 Q	4:25.90	10

=== Women's ===
Athlete	Event	Heats		Final	
Athlete	Event	Time	Rank	Time	Rank
Xiandi Chua	200m backstroke	2:14.87	8 Q	2:14.20	8
Xiandi Chua	200m individual medley	2:16.24	7 Q	2:16.02	7
Xiandi Chua	400m individual medley	4:51.93	7 Q	4:53.19	9
Teia Salvino	50m backstroke	29.14	10 Q	29.02	10
Teia Salvino	100m backstroke	DNS		Did not advance	
Teia Salvino	100m butterfly	1:00.79	12	Did not advance	
Kayla Sanchez	50m backstroke	28.24	4 Q	28.19 NR	5
Kayla Sanchez	50m freestyle	24.97	5 Q	24.75 NR	4
Kayla Sanchez	100m backstroke	DNS		Did not advance	
Kayla Sanchez	100m freestyle	54.22	2 Q	53.65	4
Heather White	50m butterfly	27.62	15	Did not advance	
Heather White	50m freestyle	25.90	12	Did not advance	
Heather White	100m freestyle	55.82	10 Q	56.01	10
Heather White	200m freestyle	DNS		Did not advance	
Xiandi Chua; Teia Salvino; Kayla Sanchez; Heather White	4 × 100m freestyle relay	3:45.73	5 Q	DSQ	
Xiandi Chua; Teia Salvino; Kayla Sanchez; Heather White	4 × 100m medley relay	DNS		Did not advance	
Xiandi Chua; Teia Salvino; Kayla Sanchez; Heather White	4 × 200m freestyle relay	DNS		Did not advance	

=== Mixed ===
Athlete	Event	Heats		Final	
Athlete	Event	Time	Rank	Time	Rank
Logan Noguchi; Teia Salvino; Gian Santos; Heather White	4 × 100m medley relay	3:57.12	7 Q	3:56.26	7

== Taekwondo ==
The Philippines has qualified four taekwondo practitioners, two in each discipline.

Filipino jins contributed the most number of medals for this edition at five. Furthermore, this marks the country's first gold medal in taekwondo since the sport became a medal event in 1994.

=== Poomsae ===
Athlete	Event	Qualification		Final	
Athlete	Event	Score	Rank	Score	Rank
Jeus Yape	Men's individual	8.8300	3 Q	9.0900	3rd place, bronze medalist(s)
Juliana Candelaria	Women's individual	8.4200	1 Q	9.1300	2nd place, silver medalist(s)

=== Kyorugi ===
Athlete	Event	Round of 16	Quarterfinals	Semifinals	Final	
Athlete	Event	Opposition score	Opposition score	Opposition score	Opposition score	Rank
Kurt Bryan Barbosa	Men's –58 kg	Almushraf (KSA); W 2–0	Maeda (JPN); W 2–1	Aldaoud (JOR); W 2–0	Tleules (KAZ); L 0–2	2nd place, silver medalist(s)
Dave Cea	Men's –80 kg	Hung J-y (TPE); L 0–2	Did not advance			
Tachiana Mangin	Women's –49 kg	Bakisheva (KAZ); W 2–1	Wang Ch-l (TPE); W 2–1	Okamoto (JPN); W 2–1	Ma J. (CHN); L 0–2	2nd place, silver medalist(s)
Jessica Canabal	Women's –57 kg	Mam (CAM); W 2–1	Khirfan (JOR); L 0–2	Did not advance		
Laila Delo	Women's –67 kg	Sobirjonova (UZB); L 0–2	Did not advance			

=== Virtual ===
Athlete	Event	Round of 16	Quarterfinals	Semifinals	Final	
Athlete	Event	Opposition score	Opposition score	Opposition score	Opposition score	Rank
Jeus Yape	Mixed individual	Saber (KSA); W 2–1	Suzuki (JPN); W 2–0	Bakisheva (KAZ); W 2–0	Châu (VIE); W 2–0	1st place, gold medalist(s)

== Tennis ==
The Philippines is sending a five players to the tennis tournaments of the 2026 Asian Games. The team is led by Alexandra Eala, who is risking penalties by foregoing the China Open, a mandatory WTA event.

Athlete	Event	Round of 32	Round of 16	Quarterfinals	Semifinals	Final	
Athlete	Event	Opposition Result	Opposition Result	Opposition Result	Opposition Result	Opposition Result	Rank
Alexandra Eala	Women's singles	Bye	Cheapchandej (THA); W 2–0	Garland (TPE); W 2–0	Wang X. (CHN); L 1–2	Did not advance	3rd place, bronze medalist(s)
Tennielle Madis	Women's singles	Sakatsume (JPN); L 0–2	Did not advance				
Stefi Aludo; Tennielle Madis	Women's doubles	Junarto; Reinnamah (INA); W 2–0	Chan H-ch; Wu F-hs (TPE); L 0–2	Did not advance			
Alexandra Eala; Shaira Rivera	Women's doubles	Lai C.L. Liu (HKG); W 2–0	Jiang X. Yang Zh. (CHN); L 0–2	Did not advance			
Francis Alcantara; Stefi Aludo	Mixed doubles	Rahmani; Safi (IRI); W 2–1	Aoyama; Kusuhara (JPN); L 0–2	Did not advance			

== Teqball ==
The Philippines is represented in teqball by four athletes: Prince Agustin, Dalian Montenegro, Anel Pacis Jr., and Jhoanna Abulencia. Prince Agustin came close, losing to Saw Friday of Myanmar in the bronze medal game of the men's single tournament.

Athlete	Event	Group stage					Rank	Quarterfinals	Semifinals	Repechage	Final / BM	Rank
Athlete	Event	Opposition Result	Opposition Result	Opposition Result	Opposition Result	Opposition Result	Rank	Opposition Result	Opposition Result	Opposition Result	Opposition Result	Rank
Prince Agustin	Men's singles	Wase (JPN); L (4–12, 8–12)	Lee J-s (KOR); L (5–12, 6–12)	Bá (VIE); W (12–8, 5–12, 16–14)	Alisa (LAO); W (12–11, 12–8)	Putri (INA); L (8–12, 8–12)	4 Q	Al-Elayawi (IRQ); L (6–12, 2–12)	Did not advance	Aidarbekov (KGZ); W (12–2, 12–8)	Saw (MYA); L (7–12, 7–12)	5
Dalian Montenegro; Anel Pacis Jr.	Men's doubles	Chanliang / Thaosiri (THA); L (7–12, 4–12)	Mardan / Uba (INA); L (5–12, 12–7, 7–12)	—N/a			3	Did not advance				
Jhoanna Abulencia; Prince Agustin	Mixed doubles	Beg / Dsouza (IND); L (10–12, 3–12)	Al-Ebraheem / Al-Failakawi (KUW); W (12–7, 11–12, 12–8)	Bun / Yorn (CAM); L (6–12, 2–12)	Dejaroen / Wongkhamchan (THA); L (5–12, 5–12)	—N/a	4 Q	Abed / Rahdi (IRQ); L (3–12, 4–12)	Did not advance	Beg / Dsouza (IND); L (3–12, 6–12)	Did not advance	

== Triathlon ==
Men's

Athlete	Event	Swim (750 m)		Trans 1			Bike (20 km)			Trans 2			Run (5 km)		Total	Rank
Athlete	Event	Time	Swim Rank	Time	Transfer Rank	Overall Rank	Time	Bike Rank	Overall Rank	Time	Transfer Rank	Overall Rank	Time	Run Rank	Total	Rank
Fer Casares	Individual	9:49	23	0:37	=12	23	28:06	1	11	0:18	=10	11	16:08	=9	54:58	10
Iñaki Lorbes	Individual	9:38	17	0:39	=19	18	28:20	=7	16	0:18	=10	16	17:49	20	56:44	18

Women's

Athlete	Event	Swim (750 m)		Trans 1			Bike (20 km)			Trans 2			Run (5 km)		Total	Rank
Athlete	Event	Time	Swim Rank	Time	Transfer Rank	Overall Rank	Time	Bike Rank	Overall Rank	Time	Transfer Rank	Overall Rank	Time	Run Rank	Total	Rank
Raven Alcoseba	Individual	9:57	6	0:42	=13	8	30:07	=3	8	0:20	=7	9	19:01	12	1:00:07	9
Kim Mangrobang	Individual	10:56	24	0:44	=17	22	33:29	19	20	0:22	=16	20	21:52	20	1:07:23	20

Mixed

Athlete	Event	Swim (750 m)	Trans 1	Bike (20 km)	Trans 2	Run (5 km)	Total	Rank
Athlete	Event	Time	Time	Time	Time	Time	Total	Rank
Raven Alcoseba	Relay	4:14	0:48	10:29	0:25	7:34	1:32:56	9
Fer Casares	Relay	4:20	0:45	9:49	0:23	6:09	1:32:56	9
Kim Mangrobang	Relay	4:47	0:53	11:48	0:24	7:32	1:32:56	9
Andrew Remolino	Relay	4:13	0:48	10:25	0:22	6:48	1:32:56	9

== Volleyball ==
Both the men's and women's national volleyball teams of the Philippines have qualified for the indoor volleyball tournaments of the 2026 Asian Games. They earned their place via FIVB rankings. The men's and women's beachball teams also qualified. Volleyball will be handled directly by the Philippine Olympic Committee due to the suspension of the Philippine National Volleyball Federation by the FIVB.

=== Beach ===
The country earned its first medal in beach volleyball courtesy of Sofiah Pagara and Khylem Progella's three-set victory versus a Chinese pair in the bronze medal match.

Athletes	Event	Preliminary round				Round of 16	Quarterfinals	Semifinals	Final / BM	
Athletes	Event	Opposition Score	Opposition Score	Opposition Score	Rank	Opposition Score	Opposition Score	Opposition Score	Opposition Score	Rank
Ranran Abdilla; Lerry John Francisco	Men's	Tijan; Younousse (QAT); L 0–2 (7–21, 10–21)	Al-Hashimi; Al-Jaboubi (OMA); L 0–2 (14–21, 26–28)	—N/a	3	Did not advance				
James Buytrago; Ronniel Rosales	Men's	Bat-Enkh; Batmunkh (MGL); W 2–0 (21–11, 21–15)	Nguyễn L.T. Trần V.V. (VIE); L 0–2 (22–24, 15–21)	Akbar; Efendi (INA); L 0–2 (11–21, 13–21)	3	Did not advance				
Sofiah Pagara; Khylem Progella	Women's	Aminath; Fathimath (MDV); W 2–0 (21–6, 21-11)	Batjargal; Gantogtokh (MGL); W 2–0 (21–3, 21–3)	To W.M. To W.T. (HKG); W 2–0 (21–19, 21–17)	1 Q	Tsang N.L. Wong M.C. (HKG); W 2–0 (26–24, 21–18)	N. Matsumoto; R. Matsumoto (JPN); W 2–0 (24–22, 22–20)	Kongphopsarutawadee; Naraphornrapat (THA); L 0–2 (21–23, 18–21)	Cao Sh. Dong J. (CHN); W 2–1 (13-21, 23-21, 15-13)	3rd place, bronze medalist(s)
Bernadeth Pons; Sisi Rondina	Women's	M.L. Khatun; M.S. Khatun (BAN); W 2–0 (21–6, 21–6)	Kabulbekova; Kozhakhmet (KAZ); L 1–2 (17–21, 21–10, 10–15)	—N/a	2 Q	Ito; Sawame (JPN); W 2–0 (21–17, 21–15)	Kongphopsarutawadee; Naraphornrapat (THA); L 1–2 (17–21, 21–12, 13–15)	Did not advance		

=== Indoor ===
Summary

Team	Event	Group stage				Classification round			
Team	Event	Opposition Score	Opposition Score	Opposition Score	Rank	Opposition Score	Opposition Score	Opposition Score	Rank
Philippines men's	Men's tournament	South Korea; L 0–3	China; L 0–3	Chinese Taipei; L 1–3	4	Indonesia; L 1–3	Uzbekistan; W 3–1	Kyrgyzstan; W 3–0	13
Philippines women's	Women's tournament	China; L 0–3	Kazakhstan; L 1–3	—N/a	3	Qatar; W 3–0	Mongolia; W 3–0	Hong Kong; W 3–0	9

==== Men's tournament ====
Team roster

- Owa Retamar
- Bryan Bagunas
- Josh Ybañez
- Leo Ordiales
- Peng Taguibolos
- Lloyd Josafat
- Buds Buddin
- Marck Espejo
- Adrian Villados
- Al-Bukharie Sali
- Jude Garcia
- Kristofer Rodge Alejos

Group play

Pos	Team	Pld	W	L	Pts	SW	SL	SR	SPW	SPL	SPR	Qualification
1	China	3	3	0	7	9	4	2.250	298	276	1.080	Quarterfinals
2	South Korea	3	2	1	7	8	4	2.000	284	249	1.141	Quarterfinals
3	Chinese Taipei	3	1	2	4	6	7	0.857	279	299	0.933	Classification 9th–16th
4	Philippines	3	0	3	0	1	9	0.111	215	252	0.853	Classification 9th–16th

Source: asiangames2026.org
Rules for classification: Tiebreakers

==== Women's tournament ====
Team roster

- Shaina Nitura
- Bella Belen
- Eya Laure
- Jia de Guzman
- Angel Canino
- Dell Palomata
- Alyssa Solomon
- Amie Provido
- Thea Gagate
- Mars Alba
- Justine Jazareno
- Niña Ytang

Group play

Pos	Team	Pld	W	L	Pts	SW	SL	SR	SPW	SPL	SPR	Qualification
1	China	2	2	0	6	6	0	MAX	150	86	1.744	Quarterfinals
2	Kazakhstan	2	1	1	3	3	4	0.750	141	170	0.829	Quarterfinals
3	Philippines	2	0	2	0	1	6	0.167	143	178	0.803	Classification 9th–14th

Source: asiangames2026.org
Rules for classification: Tiebreakers

== Weightlifting ==
=== Men ===
Athlete	Event	Snatch					Clean & Jerk					Total	Rank
Athlete	Event	1	2	3	Result	Rank	1	2	3	Result	Rank	Total	Rank
Eleaphraime Limmong	60 kg	~~120~~	~~120~~	~~120~~	DNF	—	—	—	—	—	—	—	NM
Albert Delos Santos	70 kg	138	141	~~143~~	141 NR	4	178	181	183	183 WJR	3	324 WJR	3rd place, bronze medalist(s)

=== Women ===
Athlete	Event	Snatch					Clean & Jerk					Total	Rank
Athlete	Event	1	2	3	Result	Rank	1	2	3	Result	Rank	Total	Rank
Rosegie Ramos	53 kg	88	91	93	93 NR	4	105	110	~~113~~	110 NR	4	203 NR	4
Elreen Ando	61 kg	98	101	~~103~~	101	4	~~123~~	123	~~126~~	123	5	224	5
Kristel Macrohon	69 kg	98	100	102	102 NR	3	~~124~~	~~125~~	125	125 NR	5	227 NR	4

== Wrestling ==
The Philippines entered three male and three female wrestlers.

Key:

- VT (ranking points: 5–0 or 0–5) – Victory by fall.
- VB (ranking points: 5–0 or 0–5) – Victory by injury (VF for forfeit, VA for withdrawal or disqualification)
- PP (ranking points: 3–1 or 1–3) – Decision by points – the loser with technical points.
- PO (ranking points: 3–0 or 0–3) – Decision by points – the loser without technical points.
- ST (ranking points: 4–0 or 0–4) – Great superiority – the loser without technical points and a margin of victory of at least 8 (Greco-Roman) or 10 (freestyle) points.
- SP (ranking points: 4–1 or 1–4) – Technical superiority – the loser with technical points and a margin of victory of at least 8 (Greco-Roman) or 10 (freestyle) points.

Freestyle

Athlete	Event	Round of 32	Round of 16	Quarterfinals	Semifinals	Repechage	Finals	
Athlete	Event	Opposition Result	Opposition Result	Opposition Result	Opposition Result	Opposition Result	Opposition Result	Rank
Edmund Gaso	Men's –57 kg	Bye	Zou W. (CHN); L 0–11^{SP}	Did not advance				
Aliah Gavalez	Women's –50 kg	Feng Z. (CHN); L 0–4^{SP}	Did not advance					
Rea Cerventes	Women's –53 kg	Bye	Zhang J. (CHN); L 0–10^{VT}	Did not advance				
Miriam Balisme	Women's –57 kg	Liao P-y (TPE); L 0–10^{SP}	Did not advance					

Greco-Roman

Athlete	Event	Round of 16	Quarterfinal	Semifinal	Repechage	Finals	
Athlete	Event	Opposition Result	Opposition Result	Opposition Result	Opposition Result	Opposition Result	Rank
Joe Fer Callado	Men's −60 kg	Ganiev (UZB); L 0–9^{SP}	Did not advance		Suzuki (JPN); L 0–8^{SP}	Did not advance	13
Callum Roberts	Men's −87 kg	Awarke (LBN); W 5–0^{VF}	Taizo (JPN); L 0–4^{SP}	Did not advance	Bye	Kumar (IND); L 0–9^{SP}	4

== Wushu ==
=== Taolu ===
Men

Athlete	Event	Event 1		Event 2		Total	Rank
Athlete	Event	Result	Rank	Result	Rank	Total	Rank
Sandrex Gainsan	Changquan	9.690	10	—N/a		9.690	10
Mark Anthony Polo	Changquan	9.206	19	—N/a		9.206	19
Mark Ragay	Daoshu & gunshu	9.680	6	9.690	6	19.370	5
Alexander De los Reyes	Taijiquan & taijijian	9.696	9	9.676	11	19.372	9
Jones Inso	Taijiquan & taijijian	9.710	5	9.693	7	19.403	6

Women

Athlete	Event	Event 1		Event 2		Total	Rank
Athlete	Event	Result	Rank	Result	Rank	Total	Rank
Agatha Wong	Taijiquan & taijijian	9.703	7	9.156	11	18.859	10

=== Sanda ===
Athlete	Event	Round of 16	Quarterfinals	Semifinals	Final	
Athlete	Event	Opposition Score	Opposition Score	Opposition Score	Opposition Score	Rank
Carlos Baylon Jr.	Men's –56 kg	Đinh V.T. (VIE); L 0–2	Did not advance			
Gideon Fred Padua	Men's –60 kg	Bye	Tang S. (CHN); L PD	Did not advance		
Xander Alipio	Men's –65 kg	Shafoatov (TJK); W 2–0	Nguyễn K.K. (VIE); L 0–2	Did not advance		
Jenifer Kilapio	Women's –52 kg	Florentina (INA); L 0–2	Did not advance			

== Aftermath ==
Colin Syquia in equestrian is the last competitor for the Philippines to see action as she took part in the individual jumping on the day of the closing ceremony on 4 October 2026 but was unable to contribute to the medal tally. Jeus Yape was the flag bearer of the Philippine delegation during the closing ceremony.

The Philippines failed to reach its target of eight gold medals. However it did match its four-gold medal haul of the 2022 Asian Games in Hangzhou, China. Nevertheless, Philippine Sports Commission chairperson Patrick Gregorio declared the campaign as the "best medal performance in decades" with Filipino athletes amassing a total of 29 medals with four gold, nine silver, and 16 bronze medals. Philippine Olympic Committee president Abraham Tolentino maintained that the initial eight-gold medal target was attainable with some silvers and bronze "should have been gold". They finished 17th in the medal standings.

== See also ==
- Philippines at the 2026 Asian Beach Games
- Philippines at the 2026 Asian Para Games
