= Karate at the 2026 Asian Games – Women's team kata =

Women's team kata at the 2026 Asian Games
- Venue: Toyohashi City General Gymnasium
- Date: 22 September 2026
- Competitors: 24 from 8 nations

Medalists
gold medal	Vietnam; Bùi Ngọc Nhi, Hoàng Thị Thu Uyên, Nguyễn Ngọc Trâm
silver medal	Iran; Sepideh Amini, Zeinab Hosseini, Fatemeh Sadeghi
bronze medal	Philippines; Ysabielle Arrogante, Rebecca Torres, Samantha Veguillas
bronze medal	Chinese Taipei; Chien Hui-hsuan, Hung Chih-hsuan, Tien Hsin-erh

The women's team kata event at the 2026 Asian Games took place on 22 September 2026 at Toyohashi City General Gymnasium, Toyohashi, Japan. Eight teams competed in a knockout format, with Vietnam defeating Iran 5–0 in the final to win the gold medal, successfully defending the title they had won in 2022, while the Philippines and Chinese Taipei took the bronze medals.

== Schedule ==
All times are Japan Standard Time (UTC+09:00)

Date	Time	Event
Tuesday, 22 September 2026	10:00	Quarterfinals
Tuesday, 22 September 2026	10:00	Semifinals
Tuesday, 22 September 2026	10:00	Bronze medal bouts
Tuesday, 22 September 2026	15:50	Final

== Squads ==
Cambodia	Chinese Taipei	Iran	Macau
Oun Sreyda; Puthea Sreynuch; That Chhenghorng	Chien Hui-hsuan; Hung Chih-hsuan; Tien Hsin-erh	Sepideh Amini; Zeinab Hosseini; Fatemeh Sadeghi	Chu On Kei; Lei Kin Cheng; Lei Weng Kio
Nepal	Philippines	Thailand	Vietnam
Megha Limbu; Alisa Raskoti Magar; Sanu Maya Thing	Ysabielle Arrogante; Rebecca Torres; Samantha Veguillas	Phatcharin Plangplai; Monsicha Sakulrattanatara; Ramitar Terananon	Bùi Ngọc Nhi; Hoàng Thị Thu Uyên; Nguyễn Ngọc Trâm

== Results ==
=== Main bracket ===
Quarterfinals		Semifinals		Final
Philippines	5
Cambodia	0	Philippines	0
Iran	5	Iran	5
Thailand	0			Iran	0
Macau	0			Vietnam	5
Chinese Taipei	5	Chinese Taipei	0
Vietnam	5	Vietnam	5
Nepal	0

=== Repechage ===
Bronze medal bouts
Thailand	1
Philippines	4
Nepal	0
Chinese Taipei	5
