= Taekwondo at the 2026 Asian Games – Women's individual poomsae =

Taekwondo competition

Women's individual poomsae at the 2026 Asian Games
- Venue: Toyohashi City General Gymnasium
- Date: 1 October 2026
- Competitors: 16 from 16 nations

Medalists
gold medal	Jung Ha-eun	South Korea
silver medal	Juliana Candelaria	Philippines
bronze medal	Thitaree Kaewolanwasu	Thailand
bronze medal	Yuiko Niwa	Japan

The women's individual poomsae event at the 2026 Asian Games took place on 1 October 2026 at the Toyohashi City General Gymnasium in Toyohashi, Aichi, Japan.

While the 2022 Asian Games in Hangzhou used a knock-out format, this edition's poomsae competition used a cutoff system based on scores. Athletes were grouped in two groups in the semifinal phase where the top four advances to the gold medal round. They are ranked on the average of points in both recognized and freestyle poomsae. Both the third and fourth ranking athlete in the final round were awarded bronze medals.

== Schedule ==
All times are Japan Standard Time (UTC+09:00)

Date	Time	Event
Thursday, 1 October 2026	09:00	Semifinals
Thursday, 1 October 2026	15:30	Gold medal contest

== Results ==
=== Semifinals ===
==== Group 1 ====
- Recognized poomsae: Koryo

Rank	Athlete	Reco.	Free	Total
1	Jung Ha-eun (KOR)	9.02	8.84	8.93
2	Thitaree Kaewolanwasu (THA)	8.98	8.46	8.72
3	Lao I Ieng (MAC)	8.76	8.30	8.53
4	Yuiko Niwa (JPN)	8.76	8.28	8.52
5	Nicole Alethea Khaw (SGP)	8.66	8.12	8.39
6	Chen Hsin-ya (TPE)	8.56	8.18	8.37
7	Yow Mei Yee (MAS)	8.96	7.50	8.23
8	Lee Tsz Ching (HKG)	8.92	7.20	8.06

==== Group 2 ====
- Recognized poomsae: Pyongwon

Rank	Athlete	Reco.	Free	Total
1	Juliana Candelaria (PHI)	8.88	7.96	8.42
2	Yasaman Limouchi (IRI)	8.76	7.74	8.25
3	Lkhagvyn Badam (MGL)	8.70	7.78	8.24
4	Châu Ngọc Tuyết Sang (VIE)	8.56	7.34	7.95
5	Rupa Bayor (IND)	8.64	6.58	7.61
6	Azhar Makhmetova (KGZ)	8.14	6.46	7.30
7	Zena Sheraz (PAK)	8.20	5.52	6.86
8	Swastika Tamang (NEP)	8.28	4.86	6.57

=== Gold medal contest ===
- Recognized poomsae: Jitae

Rank	Athlete	Reco.	Free	Total
1st place, gold medalist(s)	Jung Ha-eun (KOR)	9.32	9.30	9.31
2nd place, silver medalist(s)	Juliana Candelaria (PHI)	9.20	9.06	9.13
3rd place, bronze medalist(s)	Thitaree Kaewolanwasu (THA)	9.18	8.90	9.04
3rd place, bronze medalist(s)	Yuiko Niwa (JPN)	9.02	8.80	8.91
5	Yasaman Limouchi (IRI)	9.10	8.60	8.85
6	Lao I Ieng (MAC)	8.96	8.72	8.84
7	Lkhagvyn Badam (MGL)	8.94	8.56	8.75
8	Châu Ngọc Tuyết Sang (VIE)	8.94	8.22	8.58
