= Taekwondo at the 2026 Asian Games – Men's individual poomsae =

Taekwondo competition

Men's individual poomsae at the 2026 Asian Games
- Venue: Toyohashi City General Gymnasium
- Date: 1 October 2026
- Competitors: 15 from 15 nations

Medalists
gold medal	Yun Kyu-sung	South Korea
silver medal	Navin Pinthasute	Thailand
bronze medal	Jeus Yape	Philippines
bronze medal	Darren Yap	Singapore

The men's individual poomsae event at the 2026 Asian Games took place on 1 October 2026 at the Toyohashi City General Gymnasium in Toyohashi, Aichi, Japan.

While the 2022 Asian Games in Hangzhou used a knock-out format, this edition's poomsae competition used a cutoff system based on scores. Athletes were grouped in two groups in the semifinal phase where the top four advances to the gold medal round. They are ranked on the average of points in both recognized and freestyle poomsae. Both the third and fourth ranking athlete in the final round were awarded bronze medals.

== Schedule ==
All times are Japan Standard Time (UTC+09:00)

Date	Time	Event
Thursday, 1 October 2026	11:30	Semifinals
Thursday, 1 October 2026	17:00	Gold medal contest

== Results ==
=== Semifinals ===
==== Group 1 ====
- Recognized poomsae: Jitae

Rank	Athlete	Reco.	Free	Total
1	Navin Pinthasute (THA)	9.04	8.90	8.97
2	Darren Yap (SGP)	8.88	8.78	8.83
3	Jeus Yape (PHI)	8.94	8.72	8.83
4	Ke Hsiang-shuo (TPE)	8.96	8.60	8.78
5	Morteza Zendehdel (IRI)	9.08	8.42	8.75
6	Andi Sultan Altaf Mirza (INA)	8.78	8.60	8.69
7	Stanislav Kim (KAZ)	8.90	8.42	8.66
8	Yuvraj Rana (NEP)	8.56	5.48	7.02

==== Group 2 ====
- Recognized poomsae: Keumgang

Rank	Athlete	Reco.	Free	Total
1	Yun Kyu-sung (KOR)	8.94	8.94	8.94
2	Chin Ken Haw (MAS)	8.92	8.64	8.78
3	Nguyễn Xuân Thành (VIE)	8.60	8.74	8.67
4	Lui Ching Nam (HKG)	8.98	8.14	8.56
5	Yumi Yanagi (JPN)	8.62	8.44	8.53
6	Wong Chi Hin (MAC)	8.84	8.08	8.46
7	Ameer Hamza (PAK)	8.06	7.98	8.02

=== Gold medal contest ===
- Recognized poomsae: Taekeuk 7

Rank	Athlete	Reco.	Free	Total
1st place, gold medalist(s)	Yun Kyu-sung (KOR)	9.34	9.42	9.38
2nd place, silver medalist(s)	Navin Pinthasute (THA)	9.30	9.26	9.28
3rd place, bronze medalist(s)	Jeus Yape (PHI)	9.10	9.08	9.09
3rd place, bronze medalist(s)	Darren Yap (SGP)	9.00	9.08	9.04
5	Nguyễn Xuân Thành (VIE)	9.06	9.00	9.03
6	Ke Hsiang-shuo (TPE)	9.16	8.86	9.01
7	Chin Ken Haw (MAS)	9.02	8.72	8.87
8	Lui Ching Nam (HKG)	9.06	8.56	8.81
