= Jeus Yape =

Filipino taekwondo practitioner (born 2004)

Personal information
- Full name: Jeus Gabriel Derick Yape
- Born: June 7, 2004 (age 22)
- Home town: Kananga, Leyte

Sport
- Sport: Taekwondo
Medal record
Men's taekwondo
Representing Philippines
Asian Games
Gold medal – first place	2026 Aichi–Nagoya	VTKD
Bronze medal – third place	2026 Aichi–Nagoya	Poomsae
SEA Games
Bronze medal – third place	2025 Thailand	Mixed team Freestyle poomsae

Jeus Gabriel Derick Yape is a Filipino taekwondo practitioner.

== Early life and education ==
Jeus Gabriel Derick Yape was born on June 7, 2004, to Roderick and Joyce Ann Yape. The Kananga, Leyte-based family is involved in taekwondo. Jeus Yape's parents are taekwondo instructors and referees and his older sister also grew up to be a taekwondo athlete. He attended the Kananga National High School. He entered the University of Santo Tomas for his collegiate studies.

== Career ==
Jeus Yape alongside his sister took part in taekwondo competitions at a young age. This ranges from school, division, and national competitions including the 2018 Palarong Pambansa.

Yape has represented the Philippines in international taekwondo competitions. He was part of the Philippine delegation which took part at the 2024 World Poomsae Championships

At the 2025 SEA Games in Thailand, Yape was part of the freestyle poomsae mixed team that earned a bronze medal.

Yape more accustomed in team events than individual contests, competed in the men's individual poomsae and Virtual Taekwondo (VTKD) disciplines at the 2026 Asian Games in Aichi and Nagoya, Japan. Yape finished as a bronze medalist in the individual poomsae. Yape followed this with a gold medal by beating Châu Ngọc Tuyết Sang of Vietnam in the final, becoming the first ever VTKD Asian Games champion.

== Achievements ==
Year	Competition	Venue	Achievement	Ref.
2025	SEA Games (Mixed team freestyle poomsae)	Thailand	Bronze medal	
2026	Asian Games (Men's individual poomsae)	Japan	Bronze medal	
2026	Asian Games (Virtual Taekwondo)	Japan	Gold medal	
