= Mixed martial arts at the 2026 Asian Games – Men's traditional 77 kg =

Men's traditional 77 kg at the 2026 Asian Games
- Venue: Nagoya City Inae Sports Center
- Dates: 20–22 September 2026
- Competitors: 10 from 10 nations

Medalists
gold medal	Yerkingali Burkitulin	Kazakhstan
silver medal	Mukhammad Nabiev	Bahrain
bronze medal	Carlos Alvarez	Philippines
bronze medal	Syimyk Zhanybek Uulu	Kyrgyzstan

The men's MMA traditional 77 kilograms competition at the 2026 Asian Games in Nagoya, Japan was held from 20 to 22 September 2026 at the Nagoya City Inae Sports Center.

Competition bouts consist of 2 rounds in total, each lasting 3 minutes in Preliminary matches or 5 minutes in Finals with a one-minute rest period between rounds. Grabbing and holding the clothing (Gi), pants, or belt of the Traditional MMA combat attire is legal.

== Schedule ==
All times are Japan Standard Time (UTC+09:00)

Date	Time	Event
Sunday, 20 September 2026	10:40	Preliminary Round
Sunday, 20 September 2026	15:20	Quarterfinals
Monday, 21 September 2026	12:20	Semifinals
Tuesday, 22 September 2026	14:34	Final

== Results ==
Preliminary round
Mukhammad Nabiev (BRN)	3
Quang Van Minh (VIE)	0
Lin Ming-dian (TPE)	0
Yerkingali Burkitulin (KAZ)	3

Quarterfinals
Varun Aryamaan Sanyal (IND)	0
Mukhammad Nabiev (BRN)	3
Syimyk Zhanybek Uulu (KGZ)	3
Ra'ad Al-Najjar (JOR)	0
Carlos Alvarez (PHI)	3
Ananda Wahyu Setyo Prabowo (INA)	0
Yerkingali Burkitulin (KAZ)	3
Yoon Tae-young (KOR)	0

Semifinals
Mukhammad Nabiev (BRN)	3
Syimyk Zhanybek Uulu (KGZ)	0
Carlos Alvarez (PHI)	0
Yerkingali Burkitulin (KAZ)	3

Final
Mukhammad Nabiev (BRN)	0
Yerkingali Burkitulin (KAZ)	3

== External Link ==
- Results
