= Rupa Bayor =

Indian taekwondo athlete (born 2000)

Personal information
- National team: India
- Born: Year 2000, Sippi,Upper Subansiri,Arunachal Pradesh

Sport
- Country: India
- Sport: Taekwondo
- Rank: Belt
- Event: Poomsae

Rupa Bayor (born 2000) is an Indian taekwondo athlete from Arunachal Pradesh. She is representing India in the Women's Poomsaee, a non-combative event at the 2026 Asian Games in September 2026. She is ranked World No.5 in 2026.

== Early life ==
Bayor is from Sippi village, Upper Subansiri district, Arunachal Pradesh, India. In 2021, she moved to Navi Mumbai to train under coach Abhishek Dubey. She was introduced to the sport by her maternal uncle, Tabu Sera, who was into karate. In 2025, she was inducted into the Target Asian Games group by the Sports Ministry and trains at Indo Korean Taekwondo Academy in Mumbai.

== Career ==
In November 2025, Bayor won a bronze medal at the World Taekwondo President Cup Europe in Innsbruck, Austria. In 2026, she won a bronze in the Asian Taekwondo Poomsae Championships in Ulaanbaatar. In July 2026, she won a gold medal at the 5th Senior Taekwondo Poomsae National Championship 2026, held at Balewadi Stadium, Pune.

In March 2022, she won a bronze medal in the women's senior 1 Poomsae event at the 8th Croatia Open International Taekwondo Championships in Zagreb.
