= Darren Yap (taekwondo) =

Singaporean taekwondo practitioner (born 2004)

Personal information
- Full name: Yap Zong Han Darren
- Born: 8 September 2004 (age 22)

Sport
- Sport: Taekwondo
Medal record
Men's taekwondo
Representing Singapore
Asian Games
| Bronze medal – third place | 2026 Aichi–Nagoya | Poomsae |
| Bronze medal – third place | 2026 Aichi–Nagoya | VTKD |
World Combat Games
| Bronze medal – third place | 2023 Riyadh | Poomsae |
SEA Games
| Bronze medal – third place | 2025 Thailand | Freestyle poomsae |
| Bronze medal – third place | 2021 Viet Nam | Recognized poomsae team |

Yap Zong Han Darren (Note: Chinese: 叶宗翰; pinyin: Yè Zōnghàn; In this Chinese name, the family name is Yap. In accordance with custom, the Western-style name is Darren Yap and the Chinese-style name is Yap Zong Han) (Born 8 September 2004) is a Singaporean taekwondo practitioner.

== Early life and education ==
Darren Yap was born on 8 September 2004. He studied at the Anglo-Chinese School (International) in Holland Village.

== Career ==
In the early 2010s, Yap has already been competing in the Junior Taekwondo Singapore Championship.

Yap has appeared in multiple SEA Games. He and his teammates won the men's poomsae team event in the 2021 SEA Games in Vietnam. He missed the podium in the 2023 edition in Cambodia. At the 2025 edition in Thailand, Yap earned a bronze medal in the men's individual freestyle poomsae.

He won a bronze medal in the men's individual poomsae at the 2023 World Combat Games in Riyadh.

Yap took part in the 2026 Asian Games in Aichi and Nagoya, Japan. He became the first ever Singaporean taekwondo medalist in the continental games by winning a bronze in the men's individual poomsae. On top of conventional taekwondo, Yap also won a second bronze medal – in Virtual Taekwondo.
