= Châu Ngọc Tuyết Sang =

Vietnamese Taekwondo athlete

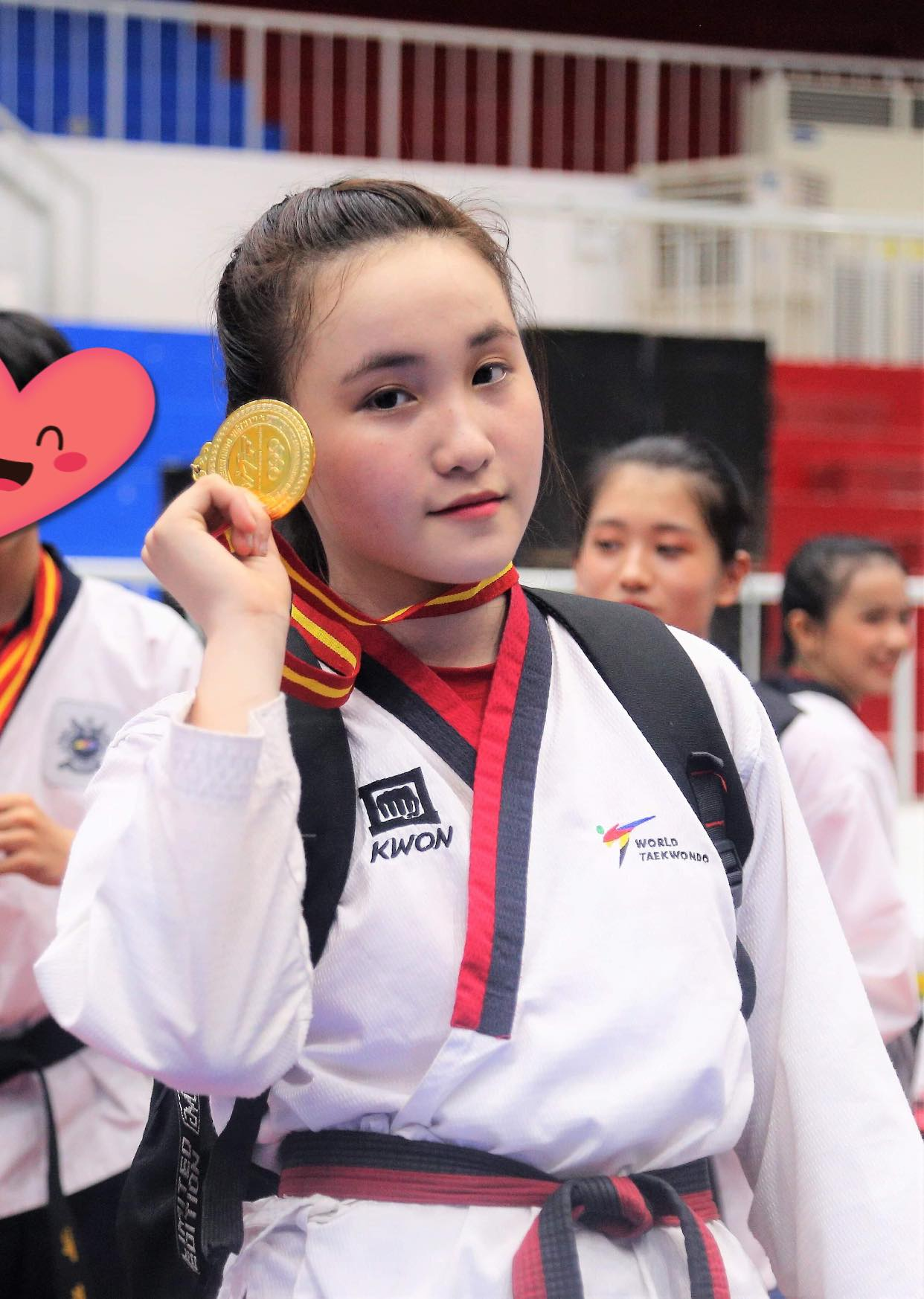
- Athlete Châu Ngọc Tuyết Sang at the 14th Southeast Asian Taekwondo Championships in Manila, Philippines, in 2019

Personal information
- Nationality: Vietnam
- Born: Châu Ngọc Tuyết Sang; 21 March 2005 (age 21) Ho Chi Minh City, Vietnam
- Education: Nguyễn Thị Định High School for Sports and Gifted Students
- Years active: 2013–present
- Relatives: Châu Tuyết Vân, Châu Ngọc Giàu

Sport
- Sport: Taekwondo
Medal record
Women's taekwondo
Representing Vietnam
Asian Games
Silver medal – second place	2026 Aichi–Nagoya	Virtual Taekwondo

Châu Ngọc Tuyết Sang (born 21 March 2005) is a Vietnamese taekwondo athlete. She is a member of the Ho Chi Minh City Taekwondo team, with a record of one silver medal and one bronze medal at the World Championships, as well as one gold medal, two silver medals, and one bronze medal at the Asian Championships.

== Career ==
=== 2018 ===
Initially, thanks to her existing foundation, she was called up to the Vietnam Taekwondo national team in 2018 to compete at the World Taekwondo Poomsae Championships in Taiwan. In her first appearance at the tournament, she and her teammates won a silver medal. This was the first international medal of her career. In the women's cadet standard poomsae team event, the three athletes Châu Ngọc Tuyết Sang, Nguyễn Thanh Hiền Linh, and Lê Ngọc Hân won the bronze medal after losing to South Korea in the final.

=== 2019 ===
The five athletes Châu Ngọc Tuyết Sang, Nguyễn Hải Trang, Nguyễn Thanh Hiền Linh, Hồ Thanh Ân, and Lê Nhật Hào won the silver medal in the five-member team event at the 2019 Asian Junior and Cadet Taekwondo Poomsae Championships.

=== 2021 ===
Châu Ngọc Tuyết Sang competed in the 15–17 age group. She won the gold medal in the women's individual freestyle poomsae event. In the team event, Châu Ngọc Tuyết Sang, Châu Kim Loan, and Nguyễn Ngọc Tường Vy won the gold medal in the women's standard team poomsae event at the 2021 National Taekwondo Club Championships.

=== 2026 ===
Taekwondo athlete Châu Ngọc Tuyết Sang, representing Ho Chi Minh City, will compete in the women's individual poomsae event at the 2026 Asian Games.

On 2 October 2026, Châu Ngọc Tuyết Sang won a silver medal at the 2026 Asian Games.

== Television programs ==
- Siêu bất ngờ – HTV7
- Thiếu Niên Nói 2021 – VTV3

== Achievements ==
Year	Competition	Venue	Achievement	Source
2017	Asian Junior Taekwondo Championships	Vietnam	Gold medal	
2017	Asian Junior Taekwondo Championships	Vietnam	Silver medal	
2018	World Taekwondo Poomsae Championships	China	Silver medal	
2018	World Taekwondo Poomsae Championships	China	Bronze medal	
2019	Asian Junior and Cadet Taekwondo Poomsae Championships	Jordan	Silver medal	
2019	Asian Junior and Cadet Taekwondo Poomsae Championships	Jordan	Bronze medal	
2021	National Taekwondo Club Championships	Vietnam	2 Gold medals	
2026	Asian Games – Virtual Taekwondo	Japan	Bronze medal	

== Family ==
She has an older sister named Châu Tuyết Vân, born in 1990, who currently holds a sixth-degree black belt. She has won six consecutive SEA Games gold medals, ten consecutive World Championship gold medals, two consecutive Asian Championship gold medals, and two Southeast Asian gold medals in the synchronized team demonstration poomsae event.
