= Virtual Taekwondo =

- Logo
- Developer: Refract Technologies
- Genres: Virtual reality, virtual sports, fighting game
- Mode: Multiplayer

Virtual Taekwondo or VTKD is a virtual reality fighting game based on traditional taekwondo developed by Refract Technologies in cooperation with World Taekwondo. It is promoted as the virtual sport counterpart of traditional taekwondo.

== Development ==
Virtual Taekwondo was a product of a partnership between World Taekwondo (WT), the international sports body for traditional taekwondo, and Singaporean firm Refract Technologies which began in 2018. The virtual sport devises Refract's Active XR Interface System (AXIS) motion-tracking technology. WT developed the virtual variant of taekwondo to provide a "meaningful advantages in terms of safety and accessibility" compared to its live counterpart. Virtual Taekwondo was received with skepticism due to its difference with the standard sport.

== Gameplay ==
Virtual Taekwondo is played by two players wearing virtual reality headsets and motion-tracking sensors on their spine, thighs and shins. They fight on a 4-by-4-meter (13 ft × 13 ft) mat for 60 seconds.

They engage in combat within a digital 3D arena using their bodies to control avatars with the goal of depleting their opponent's virtual health bar. If no opponent gets knocked out, the player with the most health by the end of the 60 seconds win.

Virtual Taekwondo is a non-contact game, with players not touching each other during a virtual fight in reality. Players can kick the opposing player's avatar's torso or head to inflict damage to the other players health. They can also make punches but it does not cause damage. It does however fill the opponent's "stun gauge", if filled will render the opponent immobile for three seconds.

== Esports ==
Virtual Taekwondo
- Highest governing body: World Taekwondo

Characteristics
- Contact: No (virtual only)
- Mixed-sex: Yes
- Equipment: Virtual reality headset, motion tracking sensors, mat

Presence
- Country or region: Asia
- Olympic: No

Virtual Taekwondo has featured in esports competitions. During games, spectators can view a fight through the players digital avatars projected on a separate screen. Men and women can fight against each other in official games.

Like traditional taekwondo, Virtual Taekwondo requires players to possess physical fitness and stamina, as their avatars replicate their real-life movements during gameplay. Proper technique and precision in executing kicks are also crucial components of competitive VTKD.

VTKD had a demonstration at the 2022 Commonwealth Esports Championships in Birmingham, England. It was later featured in an invitational tournament at the 2023 Olympic Esports Series (OES) in Singapore.

VTKD was featured at the taekwondo event of the 2026 Asian Games in Aichi and Nagoya, Japan as a regular medal event.
