= Toyohashi City General Gymnasium =

Arena in Toyohashi, Japan

Coordinates: 34°45′29.19″N 137°19′29.77″E

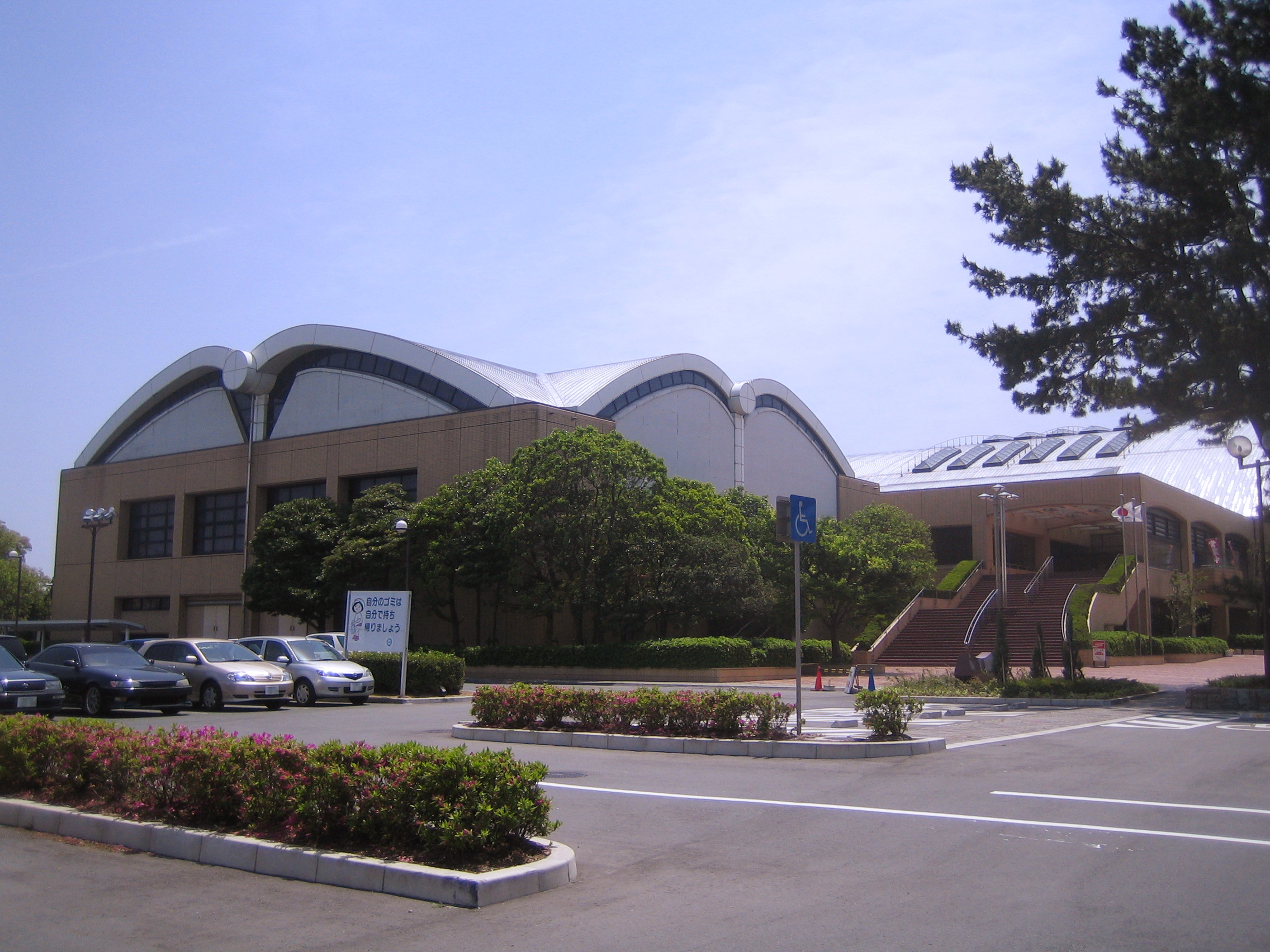
- Interactive map of Toyohashi City General Gymnasium
- Full name: Toyohashi City General Gymnasium
- Location: Toyohashi, Aichi, Japan
- Owner: Toyohashi city
- Operator: Toyohashi city
- Scoreboard: Centerhung scoreboard
- Parking: 800 spaces

Construction
- Opened: 1989
- Cost

Tenants
- 2026 Asian Games; San-en NeoPhoenix

Toyohashi City General Gymnasium is an arena in Toyohashi, Aichi, Japan. It is the home arena of the San-en NeoPhoenix of the B.League, Japan's professional basketball league.

== Gallery ==
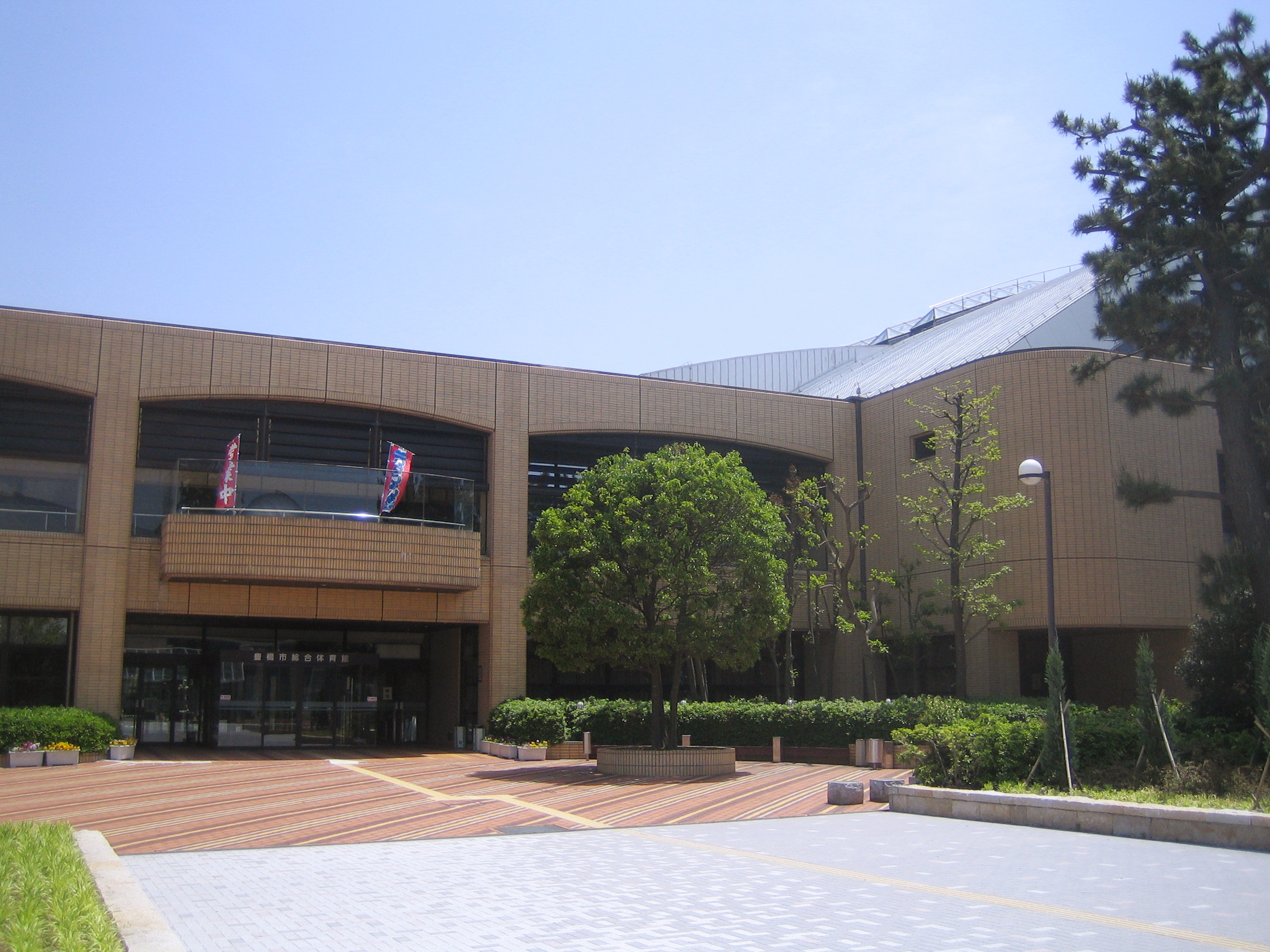

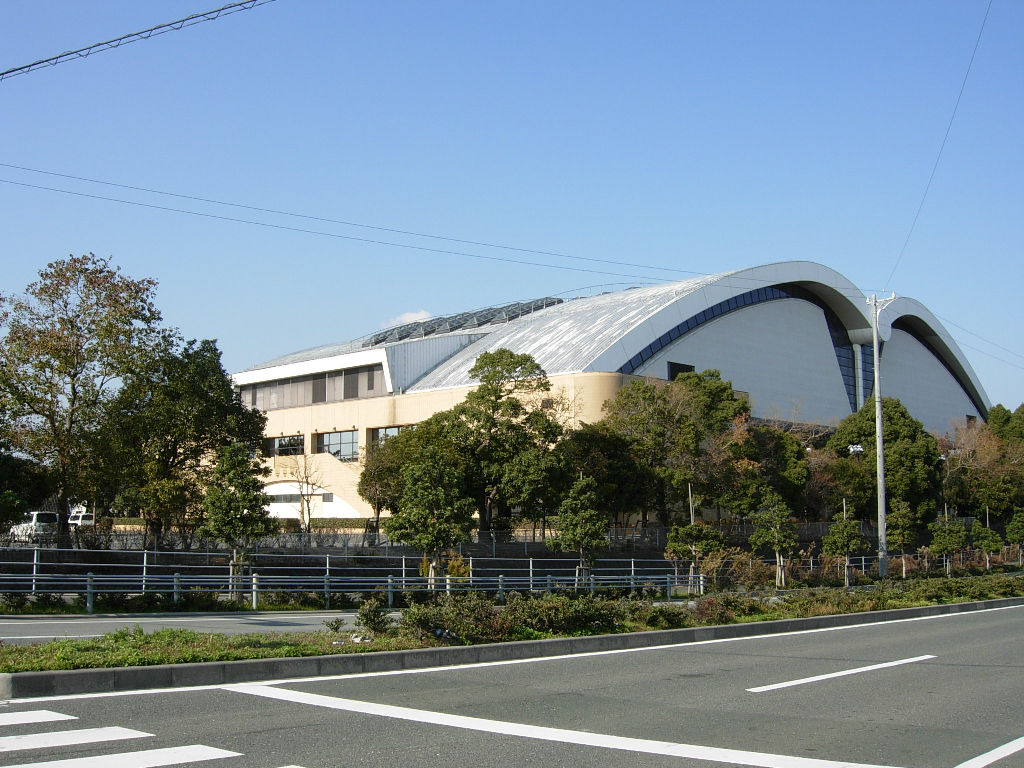

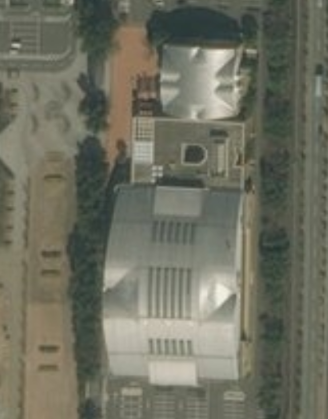
Satellite view
