= List of Asian Games medalists in padel =

This is the complete list of Asian Games medalists in padel in 2026.

== Events ==
=== Men's pairs ===
Games	Gold	Silver	Bronze
2026 Aichi–Nagoya	Mashari Naif and Rashed Naif (QAT)	Christian Didier Chin and Aidan Yunus (MAS)	Farsad Shahi and Amir Mohammad Jamshidi (IRI)

=== Women's pairs ===
Games	Gold	Silver	Bronze
2026 Aichi–Nagoya	Saki Tsukamoto and Kae Tokumoto (JPN)	Fadona Kusumawati and Fitriani Sabatini (INA)	Novela Rezha and Beatrice Gumulya (INA)
