= Indonesia at the 2026 Asian Games =

- IOC code: INA
- NOC: Indonesian Olympic Committee
- Website: www.nocindonesia.or.id (in English)

in Aichi Prefecture and Nagoya, Japan 19 September – 4 October 2026
- Competitors: 424 (246 men & 178 women) in 38 sports
- Flag bearers (opening): Daniel Hutapea; Dewa Ayu Made Sriartha
- Flag bearer (closing): Meydiana Reinammah
- Medals Ranked 16th: Gold 5 Silver 11 Bronze 23 Total 39

Asian Games appearances (overview)
- 1951; 1954; 1958; 1962; 1966; 1970; 1974; 1978; 1982; 1986; 1990; 1994; 1998; 2002; 2006; 2010; 2014; 2018; 2022; 2026

Indonesia competed in the 2026 Asian Games in Nagoya, Aichi Prefecture, Japan, from 19 September to 4 October 2026. This was the nation's twentieth appearance at the Asian Games since the inaugural games in New Delhi. Indonesia fielded 424 athletes to compete at the Games.

== Background ==
=== Administration ===
National Olympic Committee of Indonesia assigned the deputy minister of investment and downstream industry, Todotua Pasaribu, as chef de mission for the Indonesian contingent.

=== Flag bearers ===
Dewa Ayu Made Sriartha (basketball) was the Indonesian flag bearers at 2026 Asian Games opening ceremony, and accompanied by Daniel Hutapea (karate). Sriartha wore traditional Balinese attire, while Hutapea wore traditional clothing from Batak Toba.

== Competitors ==
The following is the list of number of competitors in the Games.

Sport	Men	Women	Total
3x3 basketball	4	4	8
Archery	4	6	10
Athletics	6	6	12
Badminton	10	10	20
Basketball	12	12	24
Beach volleyball	4	0	4
Boxing	3	2	5
Canoeing	10	7	17
Cycling	14	8	22
Equestrian	9	3	12
Esports	33	0	33
Fencing	1	6	7
Field hockey	18	18	36
Golf	3	3	6
Gymnastics	0	2	2
Judo	4	2	6
Karate	3	3	6
Mixed martial arts	2	1	3
Modern pentathlon	2	3	5
Padel	4	4	8
Rowing	10	5	15
Sepak takraw	9	9	18
Shooting	13	13	26
Skateboarding	3	4	7
Soft Tennis	5	2	7
Sport climbing	5	4	9
Squash	1	1	2
Surfing	2	2	4
Swimming	9	5	14
Table tennis	5	5	10
Taekwondo	3	0	3
Tennis	4	3	7
Teqball	3	1	4
Triathlon	3	2	5
Volleyball	12	12	24
Weightlifting	3	4	7
Wrestling	3	2	5
Wushu	8	5	13
Total	246	178	424

== Medal summary ==
=== Medals by sport ===
Medals by sport
Sport	1st place, gold medalist(s)	2nd place, silver medalist(s)	3rd place, bronze medalist(s)	Total
Badminton	2	1	3	6
Weightlifting	1	0	1	2
Sport climbing	1	0	0	1
Archery	1	0	0	1
Esports	0	2	0	2
Rowing	0	2	0	2
Sepak takraw	0	1	3	4
Teqball	0	1	1	2
Shooting	0	1	1	2
Padel	0	1	1	2
Surfing	0	1	0	1
Beach volleyball	0	1	0	1
Wushu	0	0	5	5
Cycling	0	0	3	3
Karate	0	0	2	2
Canoeing	0	0	1	1
Mixed martial arts	0	0	1	1
Soft tennis	0	0	1	1
Total	5	11	23	39

=== Medals by day ===
Medals by date
Day	Date	1st place, gold medalist(s)	2nd place, silver medalist(s)	3rd place, bronze medalist(s)	Total
1	20 September	0	1	4	5
2	21 September	0	0	2	2
3	22 September	0	0	1	1
4	23 September	0	0	5	5
5	24 September	1	3	3	7
6	25 September	0	0	2	2
7	26 September	1	0	0	1
8	27 September	0	1	0	1
9	28 September	0	0	3	3
10	29 September	1	2	0	3
11	30 September	1	0	0	1
12	1 October	1	1	1	3
13	2 October	0	0	1	1
14	3 October	0	3	1	4
15	4 October	0	0	0	0
Total		5	11	23	39

=== Medals by gender ===
Medals by gender
Gender	1st place, gold medalist(s)	2nd place, silver medalist(s)	3rd place, bronze medalist(s)	Total	Percentage
Male	3	8	10	21	53.8%
Female	2	2	13	17	43.6%
Mixed	0	1	0	1	2.56%
Total	5	11	23	39	100%

== Medalists ==
The following Indonesian competitors won medals at the Games.

No	Medal	Name	Sport	Event	Date
1	Gold	Jonatan Christie; Alwi Farhan; Zaki Ubaidillah; Muhamad Yusuf; Fajar Alfian; Muhammad Shohibul Fikri; Leo Rolly Carnando; Daniel Marthin; Nikolaus Joaquin; Amri Syahnawi	Badminton	Men's team	24 September
2	Gold	Rahmat Erwin Abdullah	Weightlifting	Men's 75 kg	26 September
3	Gold	Leo Rolly Carnando; Daniel Marthin	Badminton	Men's doubles	29 September
4	Gold	Desak Made Rita Kusuma Dewi	Sport climbing	Women's speed	30 September
5	Gold	Nurisa Dian Ashrifah	Archery	Women's individual compound	1 October
1	Silver	Sumaya	Teqball	Women's singles	20 September
2	Silver	Sulthanul Aulia Maruf; Muhamad Iqbal Raia Prabowo; Wira Sukmana	Shooting	Men's 10 m air pistol team	24 September
3	Silver	Ali Mardiansyah; Rafiq Wijdan Yasir	Rowing	Men's lightweight double sculls	24 September
4	Silver	Memo; Ihram; Rendi Setia Maulana; Febrian	Rowing	Men's quadruple sculls	24 September
5	Silver	Deni Ardiyanto; Novrizal Diananta Said; Marcello Hillers; GM Judha Raja Panggabean; Muhammad Haikal Irawan	Esports	Pokémon Unite	27 September
6	Silver	Amri Syahnawi; Nita Violina Marwah	Badminton	Mixed doubles	29 September
7	Silver	I Made Pajar Ariyana	Surfing	Men's shortboard	29 September
8	Silver	Alexander Owen Marcetami Buhe; Albert Neilsen Iskandar; Arif Fudin Dingarai Putra; Dalvin Ramadhana Putra; Syauki Fauzan Sumarno; A Muhammad Affan Wahyudi	Esports	Mobile Legends: Bang Bang	1 October
9	Silver	Muhammad Hardiansyah Muliang; Jelki Ladada; Saiful Rijal; Yudha Aswinatama; Muhammad Ubaidur Rohman; Andi Try Sandi Saputra	Sepak takraw	Men's quadrant	3 October
10	Silver	Bintang Akbar; Sofyan Rachman Effendi	Beach volleyball	Men's tournament	3 October
11	Silver	Fadona Kusumawati; Fitriani Sabatini	Padel	Women's pairs	3 October
1	Bronze	Seraf Naro Siregar	Wushu	Men's changquan	20 September
2	Bronze	Yoga Ardika Putra	Teqball	Men's singles	20 September
3	Bronze	Muhammad Reza Falevi; Tio Juliandi Hutauruk; Rizky Laluyan; Bagus Angga Boedy Pradewa; Fernando Sanger	Soft tennis	Men's team	20 September
4	Bronze	Leica Al Humaira Lubis	Karate	Women's +68 kg	20 September
5	Bronze	Eugenia Diva Widodo	Wushu	Women's changquan	21 September
6	Bronze	Vallensia Fahira Hotmauli	Mixed martial arts	Women's modern 54 kg	21 September
7	Bronze	Cok Istri Agung Sanistyarani	Karate	Women's -55 kg	22 September
8	Bronze	Luluk Diana Tri Wijayana	Weightlifting	Women's 49 kg	23 September
9	Bronze	Putri Kusuma Wardani; Thalita Ramadhani Wiryawan; Mutiara Ayu Puspitasari; Ni Kadek Dhinda Amartya Pratiwi; Rachel Allessya Rose; Febi Setianingrum; Febriana Dwipuji Kusuma; Meilysa Trias Puspita Sari; Siti Fadia Silva Ramadhanti; Nita Violina Marwah	Badminton	Women's team	23 September
10	Bronze	Thania Kusumaningtyas	Wushu	Women's sanda 60 kg	23 September
11	Bronze	Fereddy Sinaga	Wushu	Men's sanda 56 kg	23 September
12	Bronze	Bintang Reindra Nada Guitara	Wushu	Men's sanda 60 kg	23 September
13	Bronze	Herlin Aprilin Lali	Canoeing	Women's C-1 200 m	24 September
14	Bronze	Muhammad Hardiansyah Muliang; Rizki Yusuf Djaina; Gelvin Usman A; Jelki Ladada; Saiful Rijal; Syamsul Akmal; Yudha Aswinatama; Muhammad Ubaidur Rohman; Andi Try Sandi Saputra	Sepak takraw	Men's team regu	24 September
15	Bronze	Sayu Bella Sukma Dewi	Cycling	Women's cross-country	24 September
16	Bronze	Kusnelia; Ayvonne Halimatu Zahra Perdhana; Dini Mita Sari; Wan Annisa Rachmadi; Frisca Kharisma Indrasari; Choirunnisa; Yuliana; Fujy Anggy Lestari; Dita Pratiwi	Sepak takraw	Women's team regu	25 September
17	Bronze	Feri Yudoyono	Cycling	Men's cross-country	25 September
18	Bronze	Jasmine Azzahra Setyobudi	Cycling	Women's BMX racing	28 September
19	Bronze	Fajar Alfian; Muhammad Shohibul Fikri	Badminton	Men's doubles	28 September
20	Bronze	Alwi Farhan	Badminton	Men's singles	28 September
21	Bronze	Muhamad Fawwaz Aditia Farrel; Aris Febrianto; Dewa Putu Yadi Suteja	Shooting	Men's 25 m rapid fire pistol team	1 October
22	Bronze	Kusnelia; Dini Mita Sari; Wan Annisa Rachmadi; Choirunnisa; Fujy Anggy Lestari; Dita Pratiwi	Sepak takraw	Women's quadrant	2 October
23	Bronze	Novela Rezha Millenia Putria; Beatrice Gumulya	Padel	Women's pairs	3 October

== Archery ==
The Indonesian Archery Association sent 10 archers, comprises four male and six female competing across the compound and recurve categories.

=== Compound ===
Athlete	Event	Ranking round		Round of 64	Round of 32	Round of 16	Quarter-finals	Semi-finals	Final / BM	
Athlete	Event	Score	Seed	Opposition Score	Opposition Score	Opposition Score	Opposition Score	Opposition Score	Opposition Score	Rank
Sostar Andaru Rinaldi	Men's individual	700	25	—N/a	Thirumuru (IND) (14); L 142–144	Did not advance				
Nurisa Dian Ashrifah	Women's individual	701	8	Bye	Ong (SGP) (31); W 149–145	Lyan (KAZ) (9); W 148–145	Taniparthi (IND) (1); W 144–143	Kang (KOR) (4); W 147–143	Cojuangco (PHI) (28); W 139–137	1st place, gold medalist(s)
Ratih Zilizati Fadhly	Women's individual	693	22	Did not advance						
Yurike Pereira	Women's individual	699	12	Bye	Mone (BAN) (26); W 144–143	Wu Nier (CHN) (5); L 148–145	Did not advance			
Nurisa Dian Ashrifah; Ratih Zilizati Fadhly; Yurike Pereira	Women's team	2093	4	—N/a		Hong Kong (HKG) (13); W 244–238	Chinese Taipei (TPE) (5); L 227–237	Did not advance		
Nurisa Dian Ashrifah; Sostar Andaru Rinaldi	Mixed team	1342	10	—N/a		Malaysia (MAS) (7); W 156(1)–156	China (CHN) (2); L 155–156	Did not advance		

=== Recurve ===
Athlete	Event	Ranking round			Round of 64	Round of 32	Round of 16	Quarter-finals	Semi-finals	Final / BM	
Athlete	Event	Score	Rank	Seed	Opposition Score	Opposition Score	Opposition Score	Opposition Score	Opposition Score	Opposition Score	Rank
Riau Ega Agata	Men's individual	677	17	7	Bye	Chauhan (IND) (30); L 4–6	Did not advance				
Ahmad Khoirul Baasith	Men's individual	686	5	5	Bye	Tshering (BHU) (37); L 4–6	Did not advance				
Alviyanto Prastyadi	Men's individual	656	34	8	Did not advance						
Riau Ega Agata; Ahmad Khoirul Baasith; Alviyanto Prastyadi	Men's team	1855	4		—N/a	Bye	Uzbekistan (UZB) (12); W 6–2	Chinese Taipei (TPE) (4); L 4–5	Did not advance		
Diananda Choirunisa	Women's individual	661	14	9	Bye	Zairi (MAS) (26); W 6–0	Zhu (CHN) (5); L 2–6	Did not advance			
Fathiyya Erista Maharani	Women's individual	655	16	10	Did not advance						
Rezza Octavia	Women's individual	661	15	8	Bye	Zhumagulova (KAZ) (24); W 7–3	Oh (KOR) (3); L 3–7	Did not advance			
Diananda Choirunisa; Fathiyya Erista Maharani; Rezza Octavia	Women's team	995	3		—N/a		Malaysia (MAS) (12); W 6–2	Bangladesh (BAN) (13); W 5–3	South Korea (KOR) (1); L 0–6	China (CHN); L 2–6	4
Diananda Choirunisa; Riau Ega Agata	Mixed team	1292	6		—N/a	Bye	Philippines (PHI) (11); L 2–6	Did not advance			

== Athletics ==
The Indonesian contingent sent 12 names of athletes consisting of 6 male athletes and 6 female athletes each.

Key
- Note–Ranks given for track events are within the athlete's heat only
- Q = Qualified for the next round
- q = Qualified for the next round as a fastest loser or, in field events, by position without achieving the qualifying target
- SB = Season Best
- PB = Personal Best
- NR = National record
- N/A = Round not applicable for the event
- Bye = Athlete not required to compete in round

Men

Athlete(s)	Event	Heat		Final	
Athlete(s)	Event	Result	Rank	Result	Rank
Wahyudi Putra	1500 m	3:57.59	21	Did not advance	
Pandu Sukarya	3000 m steeplechase	—N/a		9:18.99 SB	7
Robi Syianturi	Marathon	—N/a		2:13:12	6
Hendro	Half marathon race walk	—N/a		1:36:49	7
Abd Hafiz	Javelin throw	—N/a		70.67 SB	12
Silfanus Ndiken	Javelin throw	—N/a		NM	—N/a

Women

Athlete(s)	Event	Heat		Final	
Athlete(s)	Event	Result	Rank	Result	Rank
Dina Aulia	100 metres hurdles	13.39 SB	5 Q	13.25 SB	5
Diva Renatta Jayadi	Pole vault	—N/a		4.00	5
Maria Natalia Londa	Triple jump	—N/a		13.50	5
Violine Intan Puspita	Half marathon race walk	—N/a		1:51:00	8
Odekta Elvina Naibaho	Marathon	—N/a		2:35.24	9

Athlete	Event	100m H	HJ	SP	200 m	LJ	JT	800m	Total	Rank
Emilia Nova	Heptathlon	13.53; 1046	1.59; 724	11.39; 621	25.16; 872	5.49; 697	39.69; 661	2:32.81; 658	5279 pts	7

== Badminton ==
The Badminton Association of Indonesia announced a 20-member squad for the Games.

Men

Athlete	Event	Round of 64	Round of 32	Round of 16	Quarter-finals	Semi-finals	Final	
Athlete	Event	Opposition Score	Opposition Score	Opposition Score	Opposition Score	Opposition Score	Opposition Score	Rank
Jonatan Christie	Singles	Bye	Saidov (TJK); W 21–3, 21–3	Nettasinghe (SRI); W 15–21, 21–13, 21–15	Loh (SGP); L 14–21, 19–21	Did not advance		
Alwi Farhan	Singles	Bye	Nishimoto (JPN); W 21–12, 21–10	Leong (MAS); W 21–16, 21–11	Chou (TPE); W 21–10, 21–11	Vitidsarn (THA); L 13–21, 15–21	Did not advance	3rd place, bronze medalist(s)
Fajar Alfian; Muhammad Shohibul Fikri	Doubles	—N/a	Amsakarunan / Arjun (IND); W 21–14, 21–11	Cheung / Deng (HKG); W 21–10, 21–17	Kang / Ki (KOR); W 21–14, 20–22, 21–14	Liang / Wang (CHN); L 17–21, 21–13, 9–21	Did not advance	3rd place, bronze medalist(s)
Leo Rolly Carnando; Daniel Marthin	Doubles	—N/a	Leong / Vong (MAC); W 21–8, 21–9	Teeraratsakul / Sukhpun (THA); W 21–8, 24–22	Nguyễn / Trần (VIE); W 21–6, 21–10	Kim / Seo (KOR); W 21–11, 21–14	Liang / Wang (CHN); W 19–21, 21–13, 21–18	1st place, gold medalist(s)
Jonatan Christie; Alwi Farhan; Zaki Ubaidillah; Muhamad Yusuf; Fajar Alfian; Muhammad Shohibul Fikri; Leo Rolly Carnando; Daniel Marthin; Nikolaus Joaquin; Amri Syahnawi	Team	—N/a		Bye	Malaysia (MAS); W 3–2	Thailand (THA); W 3–1	China (CHN); W 3–2	1st place, gold medalist(s)

Women

Athlete	Event	Round of 64	Round of 32	Round of 16	Quarter-finals	Semi-finals	Final	
Athlete	Event	Opposition Score	Opposition Score	Opposition Score	Opposition Score	Opposition Score	Opposition Score	Rank
Putri Kusuma Wardani	Singles	Bye	Shahzad (PAK); W 21–5, 21–11	Hooda (IND); L 19–21, 13–21	Did not advance			
Thalita Ramadhani Wiryawan	Singles	Bye	Nguyễn (VIE); L 15–21, 10–21	Did not advance				
Rachel Allessya Rose; Febi Setianingrum	Doubles	—N/a	Tan / Thinaah (MAS); L 13–21, 11–21	Did not advance				
Febriana Dwipuji Kusuma; Meilysa Trias Puspita Sari	Doubles	—N/a	Selvam / Singhi (IND); W 21–9, 21–5	Baek / Lee (KOR); L 16–21, 21–15, 9–21	Did not advance			
Putri Kusuma Wardani; Thalita Ramadhani Wiryawan; Mutiara Ayu Puspitasari; Ni Kadek Dhinda Amartya Pratiwi; Rachel Allessya Rose; Febi Setianingrum; Febriana Dwipuji Kusuma; Meilysa Trias Puspita Sari; Siti Fadia Silva Ramadhanti; Nita Violina Marwah	Team	—N/a		Mongolia (MGL); W 3–0	Chinese Taipei (TPE); W 3–1	China (CHN); L 0–3	Did not advance	3rd place, bronze medalist(s)

Mixed

Athlete	Event	Round of 32	Round of 16	Quarter-finals	Semi-finals	Final	
Athlete	Event	Opposition Score	Opposition Score	Opposition Score	Opposition Score	Opposition Score	Rank
Nikolaus Joaquin; Siti Fadia Silva Ramadhanti	Doubles	Shaheed / Razzaq (MDV); W 21–8, 21–14	Oupthong / Sudjaipraparat (THA); L 24–26, 21–17, 18–21	Did not advance			
Amri Syahnawi; Nita Violina Marwah	Doubles	Tajibullayev / Rakhmetullayeva (KAZ); W 21–7, 21–11	Watanabe / Taguchi (JPN); W 9–21, 21–18, 21–15	Jo / Jeong (KOR); W 21–9, 12–21, 21–19	Feng / Huang (CHN); W 21–12, 21–14	Jiang / Wei (CHN); L 19–21, 8–21	2nd place, silver medalist(s)

== Basketball ==
=== 5×5 basketball ===
The Indonesian Basketball Association has designated 12 male and 12 female basketball players to the national team roster for the Asian Games. Both the men's and women's teams were drawn into group A.

Team	Event	Group Stage				Quarter-finals	Semi-finals	Final / BM	
Team	Event	Opposition Score	Opposition Score	Opposition Score	Rank	Opposition Score	Opposition Score	Opposition Score	Rank
Indonesia men's	Men's tournament	Japan; L 53–98	South Korea; L 48–102	Saudi Arabia; L 89–100	4	Did not advance			12
Indonesia women's	Women's tournament	Thailand; W 61–52	China; L 41–110	—N/a	2 Q	South Korea; L 59–101	Did not advance		6

==== Men's tournament ====
Team roster

The following is the Indonesia roster in the men's basketball tournament of the 2026 Asian Games.

Indonesia men's national basketball team – 2026 Asian Games roster
Players
Coaches

Pos.	No.	Name	Age – Date of birth	Height	Club	Ctr.
C	1	Derrick Michael Xzavierro	23 – 1 April 2003	2.08 m (6 ft 10 in)	Saga Ballooners	(Japan)
G	4	Abraham Damar Grahita	30 – 8 October 1995	1.80 m (5 ft 11 in)	Satria Muda	(Indonesia)
F	6	Ali Bagir	26 – 4 July 2000	1.95 m (6 ft 5 in)	Free agent
G	7	Andakara Prastawa	34 – 16 August 1992	1.73 m (5 ft 8 in)	Pelita Jaya	(Indonesia)
G	8	Yudha Saputera (C)	27 – 21 November 1998	1.73 m (5 ft 8 in)	Satria Muda	(Indonesia)
C	15	Vincent Rivaldi Kosasih	30 – 17 June 1996	2.03 m (6 ft 8 in)	Pelita Jaya	(Indonesia)
G	21	Hendrick Xavi Yonga	24 – 7 August 2002	1.85 m (6 ft 1 in)	Pelita Jaya	(Indonesia)
C	25	Lester Prosper	37 – 21 September 1988	2.09 m (6 ft 10 in)	Dewa United	(Indonesia)
F	29	Dame Diagne	21 – 29 July 2005	1.98 m (6 ft 6 in)	Satria Muda	(Indonesia)
F	34	Pandu Wiguna	30 – 6 October 1995	1.94 m (6 ft 4 in)	Dewa United	(Indonesia)
F	77	Fhirdan Guntara	28 – 2 September 1998	1.84 m (6 ft 0 in)	Bogor Hornbills	(Indonesia)
G	88	Anthony Beane	32 – 6 May 1994	1.88 m (6 ft 2 in)	Pelita Jaya	(Indonesia)

Head coach

- (United States) David Singleton

Assistant coach(es)

- (Indonesia) Andri Malay
- (Indonesia) Ismael

Legend

- (C) Team captain
- Club - describes last
  club before the tournament
- Age - describes age
  on 10 September 2026

Group play

Pos	Team	Pld	W	L	PF	PA	PD	Pts	Qualification
1	South Korea	3	3	0	284	197	+87	6	Quarterfinals
2	Japan (H)	3	2	1	267	233	+34	5	Quarterfinals
3	Saudi Arabia	3	1	2	246	257	−11	4	Quarterfinals
4	Indonesia	3	0	3	190	300	−110	3	

Source: AsianGames2026.org
(H) Hosts

10 September 2026
19:00

Report
Box score

Japan	98–53	Indonesia
Scoring by quarter: 29–9, 26–12, 20–14, 23–18
Pts: Tsuya 23; Rebs: Kawashima 9 Asts: Kurokawa 10		Pts: Prosper 13; Rebs: Xzavierro 5 Asts: Beane, Saputera 3

Aichi International Arena, Nagoya
Referees: Yuen Chun Yip (HKG), Mohammad Taha (JOR), Rakesh Ramalingaiah (IND)

11 September 2026
16:00

Report
Box score

Indonesia	48–102	South Korea
Scoring by quarter: 10–18, 20–21, 11–31, 7–32
Pts: Saputera 17; Rebs: Xzavierro 11; Asts: Beane 3		Pts: Lee H. 24; Rebs: Lee H. 10; Asts: Moon Y. 8

Aichi International Arena, Nagoya
Attendance: 5,154
Referees: Chuang Chih-chun (TPE), Rakesh Ramalingaiah (IND), Mandy Ngieng (MAS)

13 September 2026
16:00

Report
Box score

Saudi Arabia	100–89	Indonesia
Scoring by quarter: 21–21, 29–20, 20–14, 30–34
Pts: Abdur-Rahkman 41; Rebs: Al-Suwailem 13; Asts: Abdel Gabar 7		Pts: Grahita 22; Rebs: Kosasih 12; Asts: Saputera 8

Aichi International Arena, Nagoya
Attendance: 8,435
Referees: Chuang Chih-Chun (TPE), Hu Jing (CHN), Rakesh Ramalingaiah (IND)

==== Women's tournament ====
Team roster

The following is the Indonesia roster in the women's basketball tournament of the 2026 Asian Games.

Indonesia women's national basketball team – 2026 Asian Games roster
Players
Coaches

Pos.	No.	Name	Age – Date of birth	Height	Club	Ctr.
C	0	Lea Kahol	27 – 17 July 1999	1.78 m (5 ft 10 in)	Surabaya Fever	(Indonesia)
SG	2	Agustin Retong	31 – 24 July 1995	1.67 m (5 ft 6 in)	Surabaya Fever	(Indonesia)
G	3	Erinindita Madafa	20 – 19 November 2005	1.72 m (5 ft 8 in)	Patriot SCU	(Indonesia)
G	6	Yualita Rency	18 – 10 November 2007	1.65 m (5 ft 5 in)		(Indonesia)
PF	9	Dewa Sriartha	27 – 20 November 1998	1.78 m (5 ft 10 in)	Merpati Bali	(Indonesia)
F	10	Priscilla Karen	30 – 29 May 1996	1.71 m (5 ft 7 in)	Surabaya Fever	(Indonesia)
G	11	Faizzatus Shoimah	25 – 13 December 2000	1.75 m (5 ft 9 in)	Generasi Muda Cirebon	(Indonesia)
PG	14	Jesslyn Aritonang	24 – 18 July 2002	1.70 m (5 ft 7 in)	Surabaya Fever	(Indonesia)
SF	21	Nathania Orville	26 – 3 August 2000	1.76 m (5 ft 9 in)	Surabaya Fever	(Indonesia)
F	26	Kim Pierre-Louis	33 – 11 August 1993	1.83 m (6 ft 0 in)		(Indonesia)
F	35	Nicole Lukito	20 – 14 October 2005	1.83 m (6 ft 0 in)	UC Merced Golden Bobcats	(Indonesia)
G	46	Kartika Mahanani	19 – 13 April 2007	1.63 m (5 ft 4 in)	Generasi Muda Cirebon	(Indonesia)

Head coach

- (Lithuania) Gitautas Kievinas

Assistant coach(es)

- (Indonesia) Marlina Herawan
- (Indonesia) Andrie Ekayana
- (Indonesia) Barikh Bill Kautsar
- (Indonesia) Millania Angela

Legend

- (C) Team captain
- Club – describes last
  club before the tournament
- Age – describes age
  on 17 September 2026

Group play

Pos	Team	Pld	W	L	PF	PA	PD	Pts	Qualification
1	China	2	2	0	221	87	+134	4	Quarterfinals
2	Indonesia	2	1	1	102	162	−60	3	Quarterfinals
3	Thailand	2	0	2	98	172	−74	2	Quarterfinals

Source: aichi-nagoya2026.org

17 September 2026
13:00

Report
Result

Indonesia	61–52	Thailand
Scoring by quarter: 14–13, 22–13, 13–11, 12–15
Pts: Pierre-Louis 14; Rebs: Pierre-Louis 16; Asts: Pierre-Louis 6		Pts: Kunchuan 20; Rebs: Jensen 6 Asts: Kunchuan 4

Aichi International Arena, Nagoya
Attendance: 4,488
Referees: Ami Takano (JPN), Yuen Chun Yip (HKG), Yana Nikogossyan (KAZ)

21 September 2026
19:00

Report

China	110–41	Indonesia
Scoring by quarter: 19–13, 34–5, 27–9, 30–14
Pts: Zhang Ziyu 22; Rebs: Yang, Liu 10; Asts: Zhang Manman 10		Pts: Kusuma 8 Rebs: Kusuma 6 Asts: three players 2

Aichi International Arena, Nagoya
Referees: Mandy Ngieng (MAS), Yana Nikogossyan (KAZ), Rakesh Ramalingaiah (IND)

Quarter-finals

24 September 2026
10:00

Report

South Korea	101–59	Indonesia
Scoring by quarter: 28–18, 24–12, 19–13, 30–16
Pts: Choi 16; Rebs: three players 5 Asts: Heo 8		Pts: Retong 14; Rebs: three players 4 Asts: Madafa 5

Aichi International Arena, Nagoya
Attendance: 3,922
Referees: Chuang Chih-Chun (TPE), Yuen Chun Yip (HKG), Ami Takano (JPN)

=== 3x3 basketball ===
The men's and women's 3x3 basketball teams are competing in this Games, placed in group C and Group D respectively.

Team	Event	Group Stage				Play-ins	Quarter-finals	Semi-finals	Final / BM	
Team	Event	Opposition Score	Opposition Score	Opposition Score	Rank	Opposition Score	Opposition Score	Opposition Score	Opposition Score	Rank
Indonesia men's	Men's 3x3 tournament	Qatar; L 7–10	Bahrain; W 14–10	Chinese Taipei; L 17–22	3 Q	China; L 10–21	Did not advance			12
Indonesia women's	Women's 3x3 tournament	Singapore; L 13–21	South Korea; L 4–21	Thailand; L 4–17	4	Did not advance				15

==== Men's tournament ====
Team roster

- Daffa Dhoifullah
- Mohammed Aymane Garudi Arip
- Erick Ibrahim Junior
- Halmaheranno Aprianto Hady

Group play

Pos	Team	Pld	W	L	PF	PA	PD	Pts	Qualification
1	Qatar	3	3	0	49	37	+12	6	Quarterfinals
2	Chinese Taipei	3	2	1	58	37	+21	5	Play-ins
3	Indonesia	3	1	2	38	42	−4	4	Play-ins
4	Bahrain	3	0	3	27	56	−29	3	

Source: asiangames2026.org

21 September
18:30

Report

Qatar	10–7	Indonesia
Pts: Mousa 6		Pts: Junior 5

Kinjō-futō Station Square, Nagoya
Referees: Alexandr Rulyov (KAZ), Kim Gain (KOR)

21 September
20:35

Report

Indonesia	14–10	Bahrain
Pts: Junior 5		Pts: Alanzoor, Qambar 4

Kinjō-futō Station Square, Nagoya
Referees: Li Caiyan (CHN), Kim Gain (KOR)

23 September
14:55

Report

Indonesia	17–22	Chinese Taipei
Pts: Dhoifullah 9		Pts: Hsu 10

Kinjō-futō Station Square, Nagoya
Referees: Neoh Yuen (MAS), Kim Gain (KOR)

Play-ins

24 September
13:15

Report

China	21–10	Indonesia
Pts: Liu 12		Pts: Arip 4

Kinjō-futō Station Square, Nagoya
Referees: Alexandr Rulyov (KAZ), Neoh Yuen (MAS)

==== Women's tournament ====
Team roster

- Erlina Christiana
- Diva Intan Nur Fadillah
- Thasya Hery Saputera
- Jesslyne Jaya Wiyanto

Group play

Pos	Team	Pld	W	L	PF	PA	PD	Pts	Qualification
1	South Korea	3	3	0	56	29	+27	6	Quarterfinals
2	Thailand	3	2	1	43	25	+18	5	Play-ins
3	Singapore	3	1	2	42	49	−7	4	Play-ins
4	Indonesia	3	0	3	21	59	−38	3	

Source: 2026 Asian Games

21 September
12:00

Report

Singapore	21–13	Indonesia
Pts: Lai, Lim 7		Pts: Saputera 6

Kinjō-futō Station Square, Nagoya
Referees: Nie Cong (CHN), Chen Kuan-i (TPE)

21 September
14:05

Report

Indonesia	4–21	South Korea
Pts: Fadillah 2		Pts: Heo 10

Kinjō-futō Station Square, Nagoya
Referees: Nie Cong (CHN), Rina Nozaki (JPN)

23 September
12:25

Report

Indonesia	4–17	Thailand
Pts: Fadillah 2		Pts: Panted 7

Kinjō-futō Station Square, Nagoya
Referees: Nie Cong (CHN), Li Caiyan (CHN)

== Boxing ==
The Indonesian Boxing Association has selected five boxers who will compete in the Games.

Men

Athlete	Event	Preliminary	Quarter-finals	Semi-finals	Final	Rank
Athlete	Event	Opposition Result	Opposition Result	Opposition Result	Opposition Result	Rank
Jill Mandagie	55 kg	Kamilov (KGZ); L 1–4	Did not advanced			
Asri Udin	60 kg	Shahbakhsh (IRI); L 0–5	Did not advanced			
Maikhel Roberrd Muskita	80 kg	Toriyabe (JPN); W 5–0	Minseong (KOR); L 1–4	Did not advance		

Women

Athlete	Event	Preliminary	Quarter-finals	Semi-finals	Final	Rank
Athlete	Event	Opposition Result	Opposition Result	Opposition Result	Opposition Result	Rank
Nabila Maharani	54 kg	Pang (PRK); L RSC	Did not advance			
Huswatun Hasanah	65 kg	Naghsh (IRI); L 2–3	Did not advance			

== Canoeing ==
=== Slalom ===
Athlete	Event	Heats		Quarter-finals	Semi-finals		Final	
Athlete	Event	Best	Rank	Rank	Time	Rank	Time	Rank
Ade Yoan Sutanto	Men's C-1	291.75	11 Q	—N/a	198.55	11 Q	209.70	7
Krisna Septiana	Men's K-1	138.58	14 Q	—N/a	210.76	15 Q	168.69	9
Krisna Septiana	Men's kayak cross	82.51	12 Q	4	Did not advance			
Putu Santhi	Women's C-1	288.57	8 Q	—N/a	160.47	7 Q	199.40	6
Kadek Sintha	Women's K-1	207.26	9 Q	—N/a	152.88	8 Q	149.84	5
Kadek Sintha	Women's kayak cross	86.47	12 Q	2 Q	3		—N/a	7

=== Sprint ===
Athlete	Event	Heats		Semi-finals		Final	
Athlete	Event	Time	Rank	Time	Rank	Time	Rank
Evans Monim	Men's C-1 500 m	—N/a				1:58.042	8
Rudiansyah; Muh Burhan	Men's C-2 500 m	—N/a				1:50.199	8
Wandi; Dede Sunandar	Men's K-2 500 m	1:39.009	4	1:38.599	4 FB	1:37.767	10
Subhi; Wandi; Dede Sunandar; Indra Hidayat	Men's K-4 500 m	1:29.725	4	1:30.208	1	1:29.112	8
Herlin Aprilin Lali	Women's C-1 200 m	47.530	2	—N/a		47.309	3rd place, bronze medalist(s)
Dayumin; Sella Monim	Women's C-2 500 m	2:02.872	3	—N/a		2:04.598	8
Ramla Baharuddin	Women's K-1 500 m	—N/a				2:08.808	6
Ramla Baharuddin; Stevani Maysche Ibo	Women's K-2 500 m	1:55.066	4	1:54.493	1	1:57.578	6
Sofiyanto; Herlin Aprilin Lali	Mixed C-2 500 m	—N/a				1:55.731	5
Stevani Maysche Ibo; Subhi	Mixed K-2 500 m	1:48.988	3	—N/a		1:46.871	7

Qualification legend: QS = Semi-final; QF = Final

== Cycling ==
The Indonesia Cycling Federation entered 21 cyclists to compete in the Games.

=== BMX freestyle ===
Athlete	Event	Qualification		Final	
Athlete	Event	Time	Rank	Time	Rank
Gilang Febriansyah	Men's freestyle	32.50	9	Did not advance	

=== BMX racing ===
Athlete	Event	Motors			Point	Rank	Final	Rank
Athlete	Event	Run 1	Run 2	Run 3	Point	Rank	Time	Rank
Rio Akbar	Men's racing	32.987	32.332	31.752	13	9	Did not advance	
Fasya Ahsana Rifki	Men's racing	32.017	35.108	31.916	13	8Q	32.980	4
Amellya Nur Sifa	Women's racing	34.886	34.492	34.392	5	3 Q	35.764	5
Jasmine Azzahra Setyobudi	Women's racing	35.339	34.726	34.862	9	5 Q	34.932	3rd place, bronze medalist(s)

=== Mountain biking ===
Athlete	Event	Final	
Athlete	Event	Time	Rank
Zaenal Fanani	Men's cross-country	1:27.51	6
Feri Yudoyono	Men's cross-country	1:25.41	3rd place, bronze medalist(s)
Vara Sefti Rahmadani	Women's cross-country	LAP	7
Sayu Bella Sukma Dewi	Women's cross-country	1:28.00	3rd place, bronze medalist(s)

=== Road ===
Athlete	Event	Final	
Athlete	Event	Time	Rank
Muhammad Syelhan Nurrahmat	Men's road race	4:21:04	11
Maulana Astnan Al Hayat	Men's road race	OTL	—N/a
Julian Abi Manyu	Men's road race	DNF	—N/a
Ayustina Delia Priatna	Women's road race	2:56:10	18
Dewika Mulya Sova	Women's road race	2:54:48	12
Andini Putri Anastasya	Women's road race	3:02:00	28
Maulana Astnan Al Hayat	Men's individual time trial	47:22.09	15
Ayustina Delia Priatna	Women's individual time trial	40:49.58	11

=== Track ===
Keirin

Athlete	Event	1st Round	Repechage	2nd Round	Final
Athlete	Event	Rank	Rank	Rank	Rank
Dika Alif Dhentaka	Men's keirin	4 R	4	Did not advance	
Dhia Tsabit Az Zakky Sutaryo	Men's keirin	5 R	6	Did not advance	

Madison

Athlete	Event	Points	Rank
Terry Yudha Kusuma; Muhammad Andy Royan	Men's madison	DNF	—N/a

Omnium

Athlete	Event	Scratch race		Tempo race		Elimination race		Points race		Total points	Rank
Athlete	Event	Rank	Points	Rank	Points	Rank	Points	Rank	Points	Total points	Rank
Bernard Van Aert	Men's omnium	6	30	9	24	4	34	11	0	88	9
Ayustina Delia Priatna	Women's omnium	10	22	9	24	10	22	8	0	68	9

Sprint

Athlete	Event	Qualification		Round of 16	Repechage	Quarter-finals	Semi-finals	Final	
Athlete	Event	Time	Rank	Time	Time	Time	Time	Time	Rank
Dika Alif Dhentaka	Men's sprint	10.185	18	Did not advance					
Dhia Tsabit Az Zakky Sutaryo	Men's sprint	10.589	19	Did not advance					

Team pursuit

Athlete	Event	Qualification		First Round		Final	
Athlete	Event	Time	Rank	Time	Rank	Time	Rank
Julian Abi Manyu; Terry Yudha Kusuma; Muhammad Andy Royan; Bernard Van Aert	Men's team pursuit	4:14.524	7 Q	4:07.250	7	Did not advance	

== Equestrian ==
The Equestrian Association of Indonesia has announced the 12 riders and horses selected to compete in the Games.

Dressage

Athlete	Horse	Event	Prix St-Georges		Intermediate I		Intermediate I Freestyle	
Athlete	Horse	Event	Score (%)	Rank	Score (%)	Rank	Score (%)	Rank
Karen Leticia Herjawan	Brefood's Fayette K	Individual						
Alfaro Menayang	Darian Dakota	Individual						
Dara Ninggar Prameswari	Fine Art Von Bellin	Individual						
Audirania Amanda Putri	For Future	Individual						
Karen Leticia Herjawan; Audirania Amanda Putri; Alfaro Menayang; Dara Ninggar Prameswari	See above	Team						

Eventing

Athlete	Horse	Event	Dressage	Jumping	Cross-country	Total	Rank
Marcho Alexandro	Kodaline 3	Individual	35.90	5.20	3.20	44.30	11
Fergi Tri Nur Fajar	Quincent	Individual	44.10	5.20	22.00	71.30	21
Steven Menayang	Diaconthierra S	Individual	39.70	20.00	92.00	151.70	24
Muhamad Zaki	Sure Gold VHP Z	Individual	38.60	0.00	Did not advance		
Fergi Tri Nur Fajar; Muhamad Zaki; Marcho Alexandro; Steven Menayang	See above	Team	114.20	129.00	267.30		6

Jumping

Athlete	Horse	Event	Qualifier				Final					Total Penalties	Rank
Athlete	Horse	Event	1		2		1			2		Total Penalties	Rank
Athlete	Horse	Event	Time (s)	Rank	Time (s)	Rank	Total Penalties	Time (s)	Rank	Total Penalties	Time (s)	Total Penalties	Rank
Rahman Setiawan	Balthargos PS	Individual A	—N/a				4	76.66	10 Q	8	78.34	12	11
Arserl Rizki Brayudha	Cavallo PB Z	Individual A	—N/a				0	79.75	7 Q	14	80.19	14	12
Dirga Wira Ramadhan Sahputra	Bella PS	Individual A	—N/a				8	78.46	15	Did not advance			
Marco Wowiling	Heliodor de Vains	Individual A	—N/a				24	77.00	23	Did not advance			
Dirga Wira Ramadhan Sahputra; Marco Wowiling; Brayen Brata-Coolen; Arserl Rizki Brayudha	See above	Team											

== Esports ==
Pokémon Unite

Gamer	Event	Group stage		Rank	Quarter-final	Semi-final	Final	Rank
Gamer	Event	Opposition Score	Opposition Score	Rank	Opposition Score	Opposition Score	Opposition Score	Rank
Deni Ardiyanto; Marcello Hillers; Muhammad Haikal Irawan; Gm Judha Raja Panggabean; Novrizal Diananta Said	Pokémon Unite	Hong Kong (HKG); W 2–1	Singapore (SGP); W 2–1	1 Q	Malaysia (MAS); W 2–0	Philippines (PHI); W 2–0	Japan (JPN); L 1–3	2nd place, silver medalist(s)

Honor of Kings

Gamer	Event	Group stage		Rank	Quarter-final	Semi-final	Final	Rank
Gamer	Event	Opposition Score	Opposition Score	Rank	Opposition Score	Opposition Score	Opposition Score	Rank
Drensen; Neville Garrick; Iqbal Khan; Muh Naufal Aushaf Mahfuzh; Emanuel Hendo Paska; Agung Budi Prasetyo	Honor of Kings	Thailand (THA); W 2–0	Hong Kong (HKG); L 0–2	2 Q	China (CHN); L 0–2	Did not advance		

PUBG Mobile - Asian Games Version

Athlete	Event	WWCD	Place	Elims	Total	Rank
Fazriel Haikal Aditya; Juventino Ryan Jeremy Rolos; Sharfan Syahman Shodiq; Muh Fathyn Zilhaq Syah S Micho Ananda Pratama Wijaya	PUBG Mobile - Asian Games Version	2	34	61	95	5

MLBB

Gamer	Event	Group stage		Rank	Quarter-final	Semi-final	Final	Rank
Gamer	Event	Opposition Score	Opposition Score	Rank	Opposition Score	Opposition Score	Opposition Score	Rank
Alexander Owen Marcetami Buhe; Albert Neilsen Iskandar; Arif Fudin Dingarai Putra; Dalvin Ramadhana Putra; Syauki Fauzan Sumarno; A Muhammad Affan Wahyudi	Mobile Legends: Bang Bang	Malaysia (MAS); L 0–2	Saudi Arabia (KSA); W 2–0	2 Q	Philippines (PHI); W 2–1	Mongolia (MGL); W 2–0	Myanmar (MYA); L 0–4	2nd place, silver medalist(s)

Identity V - Asian Games Version

Athlete	Event	Group stage			Rank	Quarter-final	Semi-final	Final	Rank
Athlete	Event	Opposition Score	Opposition Score	Opposition Score	Rank	Opposition Score	Opposition Score	Opposition Score	Rank
Daffa Pasha Arifin; Ricky Aulia; Muhammad Fachrul Putra Henri; Suhartanto Ardi Mulyo; Athif Fatahilah Nursyam	Identity V - Asian Games Version	Chinese Taipei (TPE); L 1–8, 2–7	Thailand (THA); L 2–7, 2–6	Philippines (PHI); L 5–3, 3–5, 2–7	4	Did not advance			

Naraka Bladepoint

Gamer	Event	Group stage			Rank	Semi-final	Final	Rank
Gamer	Event	Opposition Score	Opposition Score	Opposition Score	Rank	Opposition Score	Opposition Score	Rank
Moch Afthon Fathony; Natha Dhiva Arya Kusuma; Ararat Samuel Manullang; Darian Wicaksana Setyawan	Naraka: Bladepoint	China (CHN); L 0–2	Thailand (THA); L 0–2	Malaysia (MAS); W 2–0	3	Did not advance		

Gran Turismo 7

Athlete	Event	Qualification		Semifinal		Final						Rank
Athlete	Event	Result	Rank	Result	Rank	Race 1	Rank	Race 2	Rank	Race 3	Rank	Rank
Andika Rama Maulana	Gran Turismo 7	2:11.929	4	20:38.504	3 Q	14:37.765	4	20:01.184	5	25:11.709	4	5

eFootball

Gamer	Event	Group stage		Rank	Quarter-final	Semi-final	Final	Rank
Gamer	Event	Opposition Score	Opposition Score	Rank	Opposition Score	Opposition Score	Opposition Score	Rank
Radinka Wiratama; Rizky Faidan	eFootball	Kyrgyzstan (KGZ); W 2–0	Hong Kong (HKG); W 2–0	1 Q	Uzbekistan (UZB); L 0–1	Did not advance		

== Fencing ==
Individual

Athlete	Event	Preliminary		Round of 32	Round of 16	Quarter-finals	Semi-finals	Final	
Athlete	Event	Opposition Score	Rank	Opposition Score	Opposition Score	Opposition Score	Opposition Score	Opposition Score	Rank
Aldo Pratama Arjoni	Men's foil	Chen (TPE): L 2–5; Choi (HKG): L 0–5; Samuel (SGP): L 2–5; Aljallaf (UAE): L 4–5; Perez (PHI): W 5–3	28 Q	Matsuyama (JPN); L 4–15	Did not advance				
Fadilah Aprilia Budifirdausi	Women's épée	Al Sharji (OMA): L 3–5; Batsaikhan (MGL): L 2–5; Trần (VIE): L 3–5; Murzataeva (UZB): L 2–5; Song (KOR):L 1–5; Chan (HKG):L 1–5	31	Did not advance					
Riley Faith Kumalaputra	Women's foil	Catantan (PHI): L 0–5; Park (KOR): L 0–5; Alblooshi (KUW): L 1–5; Gnoyeva (KAZ): L 0–5; Fu (CHN): L 0–5	24	Did not advance					
Leoda Lundy Winona	Women's foil	Volobueva (UZB): L 2–5; Ueno (JPN): L 0–5; Naorem (IND): W 5–4; Cheng (HKG): L 2–5; Catantan (CHN): L 1–5	21	Did not advance					
Nia Ayu Agustina	Women's sabre	Kaneko (JPN): L 2–5; Phokaew (THA): W 5–4; Sit (HKG): L 2–5; Jeon (KOR): L 0–5; Nicanor (PHI): L 4–5	22	Did not advance					
Reni Anggraini	Women's sabre	Pan (CHN): L 0–5; Gupta (IND): L 1–5; Dalmacio (PHI): L 2–5; Heng (SGP): L 1–5; Emura (JPN): L 1–5	24	Did not advance					

Team

Athlete	Event	Round of 16	Quarter-finals	Semi-finals	Final	
Athlete	Event	Opposition Score	Opposition Score	Opposition Score	Opposition Score	Rank
Riley Faith Kumalaputra; Leoda Lundy Winona; Putri Yanti	Women's foil	India (IND); L 24–45	Did not advance			9
Nia Ayu Agustina; Reni Anggraini; Fadilah Aprilia Budifirdausi	Women's sabre	India (IND); L 23–45	Did not advance			11

== Field hockey ==
The Indonesian men's and women's hockey squads qualified after finishing fourth and third in the 2026 Asian Games qualifiers respectively.

Summary

Key:

- s.o. – Match decided by Penalty shoot-out.

Team	Event	Group Stage						Semi-finals / Pl	Final / BM / Pl	
Team	Event	Opposition Score	Opposition Score	Opposition Score	Opposition Score	Opposition Score	Rank	Opposition Score	Opposition Score	Rank
Indonesia men's	Men's tournament	India; L 1–13	South Korea; L 0–5	Japan; L 1–12	Bangladesh; L 1–3	Sri Lanka; L 3–4	6	—N/a	Oman; L 3–3 (2–3 s.o.)	12
Indonesia women's	Women's tournament	Japan; L 0–7	India; L 1–17	Singapore; W 3–1	Thailand; W 1–0	Uzbekistan; L 1–2	4	Malaysia; L 0–3	Chinese Taipei; L 1–1 (3–4 s.o.)	8

=== Men's tournament ===
Team squads

The following is the Indonesia roster in the men's field hockey tournament of the 2026 Asian Games.

Head coach: (Malaysia) Dharma Raj Kanniah

3. Fadli Muhamad
4. Asrul Alam
5. Ferdian Rahman
7. Khaerulloh Akmal
10. Ahdan Asasi
12. Alam Fajar (GK)
13. Revo Priliandro
14. Julius Rumaropen (GK)
15. Alfandy Prastyo
16. Suharyana
17. Jerry Efendi
18. Muhammad Firdaus
19. Mochamad Fathur
20. Arthur Wibowo
21. Nurul Maulana
23. Aulia Al Ardh (C)
25. Adi Leksono
27. Andrea Guntara

Preliminary round

Pos	Team	Pld	W	D	L	GF	GA	GD	Pts	Qualification
1	India	5	5	0	0	49	4	+45	15	Semi-finals
2	South Korea	5	4	0	1	20	10	+10	12	Semi-finals
3	Japan (H)	5	3	0	2	29	7	+22	9	Fifth place classification
4	Bangladesh	5	2	0	3	9	23	−14	6	Fifth place classification
5	Sri Lanka	5	1	0	4	6	38	−32	3	Ninth place game
6	Indonesia	5	0	0	5	6	37	−31	0	Eleventh place game

Source: FIH
Rules for classification: 1) points; 2) matches won; 3) goal difference; 4) goals for; 5) head-to-head result; 6) field goals for.
(H) Hosts

20 September 2026
15:00

India	13–1	Indonesia
Lakra 6', 35'; Abhishek 12'; Dilpreet 18', 19', 37', 49'; Rajinder 19'; Mandeep 21'; Harmanpreet 28'; Sukhjeet 38', 48'; Jugraj 46'	Report	Al Ardh 33'

Gifu Prefectural Green Stadium
Umpires:
Liu Xiaoying (CHN)
Zhou Fuyi (CHN)

22 September 2026
11:00

Indonesia	0–5	South Korea
	Report	Lim Do. 11', 23', 40', 42'; Kim. H 33'

Gifu Prefectural Green Stadium
Umpires:
Haroon Rashid (PAK)
Hideki Kinoshita (JPN)

24 September 2026
17:00

Indonesia	1–12	Japan
Wibowo 20'	Report	Kimura 2'; Takade 4'; Ooka 5'; Fujishima 9', 11', 34'; Kawabe 15'; Matsumoto 23'; K. Tanaka 41'; T. Tanaka 51', 58'; Yamasaki 53'

Gifu Prefectural Green Stadium
Umpires:
Mazin Al-Shukaili (OMA)
You Hyo-sik (KOR)

26 September 2026
11:00

Bangladesh	3–1	Indonesia
Am. Islam 11', 31'; Mahmud 37'	Report	Al Ardh 48'

Gifu Prefectural Green Stadium
Umpires:
Haroon Rashid (PAK)
Coen van Bunge (NED)

28 September 2026
11:00

Sri Lanka	4–3	Indonesia
Ranasingha 11'; Batuvita 23'; Fernando 51'; Sudusinghe 58'	Report	Muhamad 20'; Prastyo 44', 50'

Gifu Prefectural Green Stadium
Umpires:
Hideki Kinoshita (JPN)
Zhou Fuyi (CHN)

Eleventh place match

1 October 2026
09:00

Indonesia	3–3	Oman
Alam 11'; Muhamad 45+'; Al Ardh 56'	Report; SO Report	Barazahan 24'; M. Al-Noufali 29'; Madit 50'
Penalties
Guntara (penalty shoot-out scored); Muhamad (penalty shoot-out missed); Asasi (penalty shoot-out missed); Fathur (penalty shoot-out scored); Firdaus (penalty shoot-out missed)	2–3	(penalty shoot-out scored) A. Al-Noufali; (penalty shoot-out missed) Al-Fazari; (penalty shoot-out scored) Al-Fazari; (penalty shoot-out missed) Al-Wahaibi; (penalty shoot-out scored) Barazahan

Gifu Prefectural Green Stadium
Umpires:
Haroon Rashid (PAK)
Mohammad Shahbaz Ali (BAN)

=== Women's tournament ===
Team squads

The following is the Indonesia roster in the women's field hockey tournament of the 2026 Asian Games.

Head coach: (Indonesia) Iman Gobinathan

1. Greschela (GK)
2. Sri Rahayu
5. Natasya Naiborhu
6. Dea Destian
7. Lispa
8. Salma Maulani
9. Asri Dewi Prasasti
10. Bernika Mersella
11. Lily Pasaribu
12. Desi Wardani
13. Innes Aditiya
14. Nisa Indira (C)
15. Rasgita
18. Selly Florentina (GK)
19. Erika Kbarek
20. Azlia Richa
22. Fatma Hapsari
28. Keyssa Vinynda

Preliminary round

Pos	Team	Pld	W	D	L	GF	GA	GD	Pts	Qualification
1	India	5	5	0	0	66	3	+63	15	Semi-finals
2	Japan (H)	5	4	0	1	23	4	+19	12	Semi-finals
3	Thailand	5	2	0	3	6	25	−19	6	Fifth place classification
4	Indonesia	5	2	0	3	6	27	−21	6	Fifth place classification
5	Singapore	5	1	0	4	4	18	−14	3	Ninth place game
6	Uzbekistan	5	1	0	4	5	33	−28	3	Eleventh place game

Source: FIH
Rules for classification: 1) points; 2) matches won; 3) goal difference; 4) goals for; 5) head-to-head result; 6) field goals for.
(H) Hosts

18 September 2026
17:00

Japan	7–0	Indonesia
Kobayakawa 26'; Murayama 32'; Shimada 40'; Ueno 45'; Saito 47'; Suzuki 50', 57'	Report

Gifu Prefectural Green Stadium
Umpires:
Kim Yoon-seon (KOR)
Rinky See (HKG)

21 September 2026
13:00

India	17–1	Indonesia
Deepika 8', 28', 40'; Toppo 11', 30'; Lalremsiami 12', 16'; Pisal 15', 20', 38'; Rana 25', 57'; Tete 34'; Navneet 35', 56', 57'; Ishika 36'	Report	Aditiya 32'

Gifu Prefectural Green Stadium
Umpires:
Shahiela Johari (MAS)
Emi Yamada (JPN)

23 September 2026
11:00

Singapore	1–3	Indonesia
S. Ng 35'	Report	Lispa 26'; Maulani 29'; Naiborhu 54'

Gifu Prefectural Green Stadium
Umpires:
Laurine Delforge (BEL)
Binish Hayat (PAK)

25 September 2026
15:00

Indonesia	1–0	Thailand
Maulani 38'	Report

Gifu Prefectural Green Stadium
Umpires:
Aleisha Neumann (AUS)
Liu Yu-Chen (TPE)

27 September 2026
11:00

Indonesia	1–2	Uzbekistan
Maulani 58'	Report	Amrieva 3'; Semyonova 47'

Gifu Prefectural Green Stadium
Umpires:
Valerie Koh (SGP)
Shahiela Johari (MAS)

Fifth place Crossover

30 September 2026
11:30

Malaysia	3–0	Indonesia
Muhamad 20'; Mohd 41', 55'	Report

Gifu Prefectural Green Stadium
Umpires:
Valerie Koh (SGP)
Yu Tian (CHN)

Seventh place match

2 October 2026
11:30

Indonesia	1–1	Chinese Taipei
Aditiya 40'	Report; SO Report	Lai 5'
Penalties
Lispa (penalty shoot-out missed); Rahayu (penalty shoot-out missed); Indira (penalty shoot-out scored); Prasasti (penalty shoot-out scored); Aditiya (penalty shoot-out scored); Indira (penalty shoot-out missed); Prasasti (penalty shoot-out missed)	3–4	(penalty shoot-out missed) Huang; (penalty shoot-out scored) Lai; (penalty shoot-out scored) Wang; (penalty shoot-out scored) Chang; (penalty shoot-out missed) Fan; (penalty shoot-out missed) Wang; (penalty shoot-out scored) Chang

Gifu Prefectural Green Stadium
Umpires:
Rama Potnis (IND)
Cookie Tan (SGP)

== Golf ==
Individual

Golfer	Event	Round 1	Round 2	Round 3	Round 4	Total		
Golfer	Event	Score	Score	Score	Score	Score	To Par	Rank
Jonathan Wijono	Men stroke play	68	68	72	69	277	–3	T15
Naraajie Emerald Ramadhan Putra	Men stroke play	71	69	70	72	282	+2	T27
Randy Arbenata Mohamad Bintang	Men stroke play	73	76	Cut		149	+9	43
Kristina Natalia Yoko	Women stroke play	73	75	Cut		148	+8	T29
Holly Victoria Halim	Women stroke play	72	75	Cut		147	+7	28
Elaine Widjaya	Women stroke play	73	73	73	79	298	+18	27

Team

Golfer	Event	Round 1	Round 2	Round 3	Round 4	Total		
Golfer	Event	Score	Score	Score	Score	Score	To Par	Rank
Jonathan Wijono; Naraajie Emerald Ramadhan Putra; Randy Arbenata Mohamad Bintang	Men	139	137	142	136	554	–6	10
Kristina Natalia Yoko; Holly Victoria Halim; Elaine Widjaya	Women	145	148	Cut		293	+13	10

== Gymnastics ==
The Indonesian Gymnastics Federation sent two gymnasts to the Games after qualifying at the Asian Championships.

=== Artistic ===
Athlete	Event	Qualification						Final					
Athlete	Event	Apparatus				Total	Rank	Apparatus				Total	Rank
Athlete	Event	V	UB	BB	F	Total	Rank	V	UB	BB	F	Total	Rank
Dyalnov Clara Aqina Brahmana	Women's all-around	—N/a						11.466	8.100	9.800	11.233	40.599	26

=== Rhythmic ===
Athlete	Event	Qualification						Final					
Athlete	Event	Apparatus				Total	Rank	Apparatus				Total	Rank
Athlete	Event	Hoop	Ball	Clubs	Ribbon	Total	Rank	Hoop	Ball	Clubs	Ribbon	Total	Rank
Tri Wahyuni	Women's all-around	21.000	17.900	20.950	20.750	80.600	20	Did not advance					

== Judo ==
The Indonesian Judo Association entered six judoka to compete at the Games.

Key:

- 1st number — Ippon
- 2nd number — Waza-ari
- 3rd number — Yuko
- s — Shido

Men

Athlete	Event	Round of 32	Round of 16	Quarter-final	Semi-finals	Repechange	Final / BM	
Athlete	Event	Opposition Result	Opposition Result	Opposition Result	Opposition Result	Opposition Result	Opposition Result	Rank
Muhammad Rizqi Maulana	–60 kg	Sithisane (LAO); W 100–000	Enkhtaivan (MGL); L 000s1–001s1	Did not advance				
Muhammad Fathur Rahman	–66 kg	Makabr (YEM); W 110s1–000s1	Xue (CHN); L 000s3–100s1	Did not advance				
I Made Sastra Dharma	–90 kg	—N/a	Kim (KOR); L 000–100	Did not advance				
I Gede Agastya Darma Wardana	+100 kg	—N/a	Kazhybayev (KAZ); L 000s1–100s1	Did not advance				

Women

Athlete	Event	Round of 16	Quarter-finals	Semi-finals	Repechange	Final / BM	
Athlete	Event	Opposition Result	Opposition Result	Opposition Result	Opposition Result	Opposition Result	Rank
Dinny Febriany	–57 kg	Shirakane (JPN); L 000–100	Did not advance				
Indah Permatasari	+78 kg	Satjadet (THA); L 001s1–010s2	Did not advance				

== Karate ==
Indonesia entered six karateka to compete in kata and kumite events at the Games.

Kata

Athlete	Event	Round of 32	Round of 16	Quarter-finals	Semi-finals / R	Final / BM	
Athlete	Event	Opposition Score	Opposition Score	Opposition Score	Opposition Score	Opposition Score	Rank
Cristopher Edbert Setiabudi	Men's individual	—N/a	Bye	Nishiyama (JPN); L 0–5	Edward (NEP); W 5–0	Mosawi (KUW); L 2–3	4
Marzella Sekar Damayanti	Women's individual	—N/a	Chien H-h (TPE); L 1–4	Did not advance			

Kumite

Athlete	Event	Round of 32	Round of 16	Quarter-finals	Semi-finals / R	Final / BM	
Athlete	Event	Opposition Score	Opposition Score	Opposition Score	Opposition Score	Opposition Score	Rank
M. Tegar Januar	Men's –55 kg	—N/a		Hasimudin (BRU); W 2–1	Bigabyl (KAZ); L 1–6	Muminov (TJK); L 0–8	4
Daniel Hutapea	Men's +84 kg	—N/a		Sreang (CAM); W 5–0	Sufyani (KSA); L 2–8	Kangtong (THA); L 3–6	4
Cok Istri Agung Sanistyarani	Women's –55 kg	—N/a	Alisha (IND); W 6–1	Lei HK (MAC); W 8–5	Saediabadi (IRI); L 0–8	Marissa (SGP); W 7–3	3rd place, bronze medalist(s)
Leica Al Humaira Lubis	Women's +68 kg	—N/a		Egamberdieva (UZB); W 3–0	Butsuwan (THA); L 3–4	Orozalieva (KGZ); W 4–1	3rd place, bronze medalist(s)

== Mixed martial arts ==
Indonesia has qualified three athletes to compete in mixed martial arts at the Games.

Men's

Athlete	Event	Preliminary	Quarter-finals	Semi-finals	Final	Rank
Athlete	Event	Opposition Result	Opposition Result	Opposition Result	Opposition Result	Rank
Gibran Alfarizi	Men's –65 kg	—N/a	Murayama (JPN); L 0–3	Did not advance		
Ananda Wahyu Setyo Prabowo	Men's –77 kg	—N/a	Avares (PHI); L 0–3	Did not advance		

Women's

Athlete	Event	Preliminary	Quarter-finals	Semi-finals	Final	Rank
Athlete	Event	Opposition Result	Opposition Result	Opposition Result	Opposition Result	Rank
Vallensia Fahira Hotmauli	Women's –54 kg	—N/a	Murzagalieva (KGZ); W 2–0	Phattaraboonsorn (THA); L 0–3	Did not advance	3rd place, bronze medalist(s)

== Modern pentathlon ==
The Modern Pentathlon Indonesia entered five athletes to compete at the Games.

Individual

Athlete	Event	Fencing ranking round (épée one touch)		Semi-finals													Final												
Athlete	Event	Fencing ranking round (épée one touch)		Fencing		Obstacles			Swimming (100 m freestyle)			Laser-run (10 m laser pistol / 3000 m cross-country)			Total points	Final rank	Fencing		Obstacles			Swimming			Laser-run			Total points	Final rank
Athlete	Event	V–D	Rank	Rank	MP points	Time	Rank	MP points	Time	Rank	MP points	Time	Rank	MP points	Total points	Final rank	Rank	MP points	Time	Rank	MP points	Time	Rank	MP points	Time	Rank	MP points	Total points	Final rank
Muhammad Ifsan	Men	12–23	28	14	208	0:22.28	1	379	01:04.99	276	15	12:17.95	14	563	1426	14	Did not advance												
Samuel Matulatuwa	Men	13–22	27	14	208	0:24.47	6	372	0:55.87	3	321	12:25.68	10	555	1456	10	Did not advance												
Caroline Andita Bangun	Women	20–12	9	9	218	0:32.26	4	349	1:02.81	2	286	13:22.03	9	498	1351	8 Q	10	216	0:30.12	6	355	1:01.85	8	291	13:44.83	17	476	1338	15
Nurfa Inayah Nurul Qalbi	Women	8–24	30	16	206	0:44.68	10	311	1:03.39	5	284	15:31.91	14	369	1170	12	Did not advance												
Sri Wahyuni	Women	12–20	24	13	210	0:54.11	14	283	1:06.94	10	266	13:08.74	9	493	1252	12	Did not advance												

Team

Athlete	Event	Fencing	Obstacle	Swimming	Laser Run	Total	Rank
Caroline Bangun; Nurfa Inayah Nurul Qalbi; Sri Wahyuni	Women	632	949	841	1338	3760	5

== Padel ==
Athlete	Event	Round of 32	Round of 16	Quarter-finals	Semi-finals	Final / BM	Rank
Athlete	Event	Opposition Score	Opposition Score	Opposition Score	Opposition Score	Opposition Score	Rank
Valentinus Anak Agung Ngurah; Armando Charisma Soemarno	Men's pairs	Bye	Ando / Nakamura (JPN); L 3–6, 4–6	Did not advance			
Giorgio Alessandro Soemarno; Christian Alvin Edison	Men's pairs	Lapidus / Canizares (PHI); L 1–6, 4–6	Did not advance				
Novela Rezha Millenia Putria; Beatrice Gumulya	Women's pairs	Bye	Fard / Kahrizi (IRI); W 6–3, 6–1	Chan / Law (HKG); W 6–1, 6–2	Tsukamoto / Tokumoto (JPN); L 1–6, 3–6	Malazarte / Abad (PHI); W 6–0, 6–0	3rd place, bronze medalist(s)
Fadona Kusumawati; Fitriani Sabatini	Women's pairs	Bye	Alsarraj / Alqenaei (KUW); W 6–1, 6–0	Sato / Ozawa (JPN); W 6–0, 6–1	Malazarte / Abad (PHI); W 6–0, 6–0	Tsukamoto / Tokumoto (JPN); L 3–6, 4–6	2nd place, silver medalist(s)

== Rowing ==
Men

Athlete	Event	Heats		Final	
Athlete	Event	Time	Rank	Time	Rank
Memo; Ihram; Febrian	Double sculls	6:15.26	2 FA	6:14.42	4
Memo; Ihram; Rendi Setia Maulana; Febrian	Quadruple sculls	6:45.52	2 FA	5:47.90	2nd place, silver medalist(s)
Ferdiansyah; Sulpianto; Asuhan Pattiiha	Pair	6:32.26	2 FA	7:40.71	6
M Ikbal; Ferdiansyah; Sulpianto; Ardi Isadi; Asuhan Pattiiha	Four	6:23.41	3 FA	6:10.78	6
Ali Mardiansyah; Rafiq Wijdan Yasir	Lightweight double sculls	6:11.28	1 FA	6:23.41	2nd place, silver medalist(s)

Women

Athlete	Event	Heats		Final	
Athlete	Event	Time	Rank	Time	Rank
Mutiara Rahma Putri	Single sculls	8:19.29	3 FA	7:46.44	4
Chelsea Corputty; Issa Behuku	Pair	8:23.12	9 FB	7:38.73	8
Chelsea Corputty; Aisah Nabila; Issa Behuku; Nurtang	Four	6:56.94	8 FB	7:07.06	8

Qualification legend: FA = Final A FB = Final B

== Sepak takraw ==
Men

Athlete	Event	Group stage				Semi-finals	Final	
Athlete	Event	Opposition Score	Opposition Score	Opposition Score	Rank	Opposition Score	Opposition Score	Rank
Muhammad Hardiansyah Muliang; Jelki Ladada; Saiful Rijal; Yudha Aswinatama; Muhammad Ubaidur Rohman; Andi Try Sandi Saputra	Quadrant	South Korea (KOR); W 2–0	Japan (JPN); W 2–1	Singapore (SGP); W 2–0	1 Q	Myanmar (MYA); W 2–0	Japan (JPN); L 1–2	2nd place, silver medalist(s)
Muhammad Hardiansyah Muliang; Rizki Yusuf Djaina; Gelvin Usman A Jelki Ladada; Saiful Rijal; Syamsul Akmal; Yudha Aswinatama; Muhammad Ubaidur Rohman; Andi Try Sandi Saputra	Team regu	Laos (LAO); W 3–0	Thailand (THA); L 0–3	South Korea (KOR); W 3–0	2 Q	Malaysia (MAS); L 1–2	Did not advance	3rd place, bronze medalist(s)

Women

Athlete	Event	Group stage				Semi-finals	Final / BM	
Athlete	Event	Opposition Score	Opposition Score	Opposition Score	Rank	Opposition Score	Opposition Score	Rank
Kusnelia; Dini Mita Sari; Wan Annisa Rachmadi; Choirunnisa; Fujy Anggy Lestari; Dita Pratiwi	Quadrant	Laos (LAO); W 2–0	Japan (JPN); W 2–0	Malaysia (MAS); W 2–1	1 Q	Thailand (THA); L 0–2	Did not advance	3rd place, bronze medalist(s)
Kusnelia; Ayvonne Halimatu Zahra Perdhana; Dini Mita Sari; Wan Annisa Rachmadi; Frisca Kharisma Indrasari; Choirunnisa; Yuliana; Fujy Anggy Lestari; Dita Pratiwi	Team regu	South Korea (KOR); L 0–3	Thailand (THA); L 0–3	Japan (JPN); W 3–0	3 Q	South Korea (KOR); L 0–2	Japan (JPN); W 2–0	3rd place, bronze medalist(s)

== Shooting ==
The Indonesian contingent sent 26 names of athletes consisting of 13 male athletes and 13 female athletes each.

Men

Athlete	Event	Qualification		Final	
Athlete	Event	Points	Rank	Points	Rank
Kanurian Al Ghozi	10 m air rifle	630.2	6 Q	123.2	8
Anang Febrian	10 m air rifle	627.4	14	Did not advance	
Fathur Gustafian	10 m air rifle	624.9	23	Did not advance	
Kanurian Al Ghozi; Anang Febrian; Fathur Gustafian	10 m air rifle team	—N/a		1882.5	4
Kanurian Al Ghozi	50 m rifle 3 positions	573-26x	27	Did not advance	
Davin Rosyiid Wibowo	50 m rifle 3 positions	565-15x	37	Did not advance	
Fathur Gustafian	50 m rifle 3 positions	578-24x	22	Did not advance	
Kanurian Al Ghozi; Davin Rosyiid Wibowo; Fathur Gustafian	50 m rifle 3 positions team	—N/a		1716-65x	10
Sulthanul Aulia Maruf	10 m air pistol	583-16x	3 Q	157.8	6
Muhamad Iqbal Raia Prabowo	10 m air pistol	589-21x	1 Q	138.5	7
Wira Sukmana	10 m air pistol	571-20x	25	Did not advance	
Sulthanul Aulia Maruf; Muhamad Iqbal Raia Prabowo; Wira Sukmana	10 m air pistol team	—N/a		1743-57x	2nd place, silver medalist(s)
Muhamad Fawwaz Aditia Farrel	25 m rapid fire pistol	580-13x	16	Did not advance	
Aris Febrianto	25 m rapid fire pistol	572-7x	13	Did not advance	
Dewa Putu Yadi Suteja	25 m rapid fire pistol	578-16x	8 Q	18	5
Muhamad Fawwaz Aditia Farrel; Aris Febrianto; Dewa Putu Yadi Suteja	25 m rapid fire pistol team	—N/a		1720-36x	3rd place, bronze medalist(s)
Bagus Sholeh Aristyawan	Trap	107	31	Did not advance	
Andreas Yunus Boki	Trap	112	22	Did not advance	
Woli Hamsan	Skeet	101	42	Did not advance	

Women

Athlete	Event	Qualification		Final	
Athlete	Event	Points	Rank	Points	Rank
Yasmin Figlia Achadiat	10 m air rifle	623.6	31	Did not advance	
Audrey Zahra Dhiyaanisa	10 m air rifle	622.4	36	Did not advance	
Dominique Rachmawati Karini	10 m air rifle	630.6	11	Did not advance	
Yasmin Figlia Achadiat; Audrey Zahra Dhiyaanisa; Dominique Rachmawati Karini	10 m air rifle team	—N/a		1876.6	8
Audrey Zahra Dhiyaanisa	50 m rifle 3 positions	587-18x	12	Did not advance	
Citra Dewi Resti	50 m rifle 3 positions	574-19x	38	Did not advance	
Vidya Rafika Toyyiba	50 m rifle 3 positions	583-24x	20	Did not advance	
Audrey Zahra Dhiyaanisa; Citra Dewi Resti; Vidya Rafika Toyyiba	50 m rifle 3 positions team	—N/a		1774-61x	8
Rihadatul Asyifa	10 m air pistol	567-14x	29	Did not advance	
Arista Perdana Putri Darmoyo	10 m air pistol	572-14x	14	Did not advance	
Derli Amalia Putri	10 m air pistol	559-7x	40	Did not advance	
Rihadatul Asyifa; Arista Perdana Putri Darmoyo; Derli Amalia Putri	10 m air pistol team	—N/a		1698-35x	9
Rihadatul Asyifa	25 m pistol	569-12x	29	Did not advance	
Shiva Awallu Nissa	25 m pistol	550-6x	44	Did not advance	
Juliani Wenas	25 m pistol	572-13x	22	Did not advance	
Rihadatul Asyifa; Shiva Awallu Nissa; Juliani Wenas	25 m pistol team	—N/a		1691-31x	12
Adylia Safitri	Trap	99	27	Did not advance	
Fany Febriana Wulandari	Trap	104	22	Did not advance	
Yemima Natalia Sinaga	Skeet	105	19	Did not advance	

Mixed

Athlete	Event	Qualification		Final	
Athlete	Event	Points	Rank	Points	Rank
Fathur Gustafian; Dominique Rachmawati Karini	10 m air rifle team	626.9	7	Did not advance	
Muhamad Iqbal Raia Prabowo; Arista Perdana Putri Darmoyo	10 m air pistol team	580-30x	4	349.4	4
Woli Hamsan; Yemima Natalia Sinaga	Skeet team	106	11	Did not advance	
Andreas Yunus Boki; Adylia Safitri	Trap team	122	12	Did not advance	

== Skateboarding ==
Men

Athlete	Event	Preliminary		Final	
Athlete	Event	Result	Rank	Result	Rank
Firdausy Hartanto	Park	45.65	13	Did not advance	
Basral Graito Hutomo	Street	144.88	4 Q	151.41	4
Sanggoe Darma Tanjung	Street	89.60	11	Did not advance	

Women

Athlete	Event	Preliminary		Final	
Athlete	Event	Result	Rank	Result	Rank
Mikhayla Shanum Caya	Park	36.35	12	Did not advance	
Bunga Nyimas	Park	52.68	10	Did not advance	
Zeefara Mahika Darmawan	Street	83.43	9	Did not advance	
Ni Wayan Malana Fairbrother	Street	101.61	8 Q	136.97	6

== Soft tennis ==
Indonesia deployed a delegation of seven soft tennis athletes, comprising five men and two women, to participate in the Games.

Men

Athlete	Event	Group stage				Second Stage	Quarter-finals	Semi-finals	Final	
Athlete	Event	Opposition Score	Opposition Score	Opposition Score	Rank	Opposition Score	Opposition Score	Opposition Score	Opposition Score	Rank
Muhammad Reza Falevi	Singles	Vongphakdy (LAO); W 4–0	Nuguit (PHI); L 3–4	—N/a	2	Did not advance				
Tio Juliandi Hutauruk	Singles	Ali (PAK); W 4–0	Uematsu (JPN); L 2–4	Doeum (CAM); W 4–2	2	Did not advance				
Muhammad Reza Falevi; Tio Juliandi Hutauruk; Rizky Laluyan; Bagus Angga Boedy Pradewa; Fernando Sanger	Team	Nepal; W 3–0	South Korea; L 1–2	—N/a	2 Q	—N/a	India; W 2–0	Japan; L 2–0	Did not advanced	3rd place, bronze medalist(s)

Women

Athlete	Event	Group stage			Second stage	Quarter-finals	Semi-finals	Final / BM	
Athlete	Event	Opposition Score	Opposition Score	Rank	Opposition Score	Opposition Score	Opposition Score	Opposition Score	Rank
Alif Nafiiah	Singles	Catindig (PHI); W 4–1	Ri (PRK); L 1–4	2	Did not advance				
Siti Nur Arasy	Singles	Chhan (CAM); W 4–1	Chiang (TPE); L 1–4	2	Did not advance				

Mixed

Athlete	Event	Group stage				First round	Quarter-finals	Semi-finals	Final / BM	
Athlete	Event	Oppositions Score	Oppositions Score	Opposition Score	Rank	Oppositions Score	Opposition Score	Opposition Score	Opposition Score	Rank
Fernando Sanger; Siti Nur Arasy	Doubles	Hacnolath / Simmalavong (LAO); W 5–1	Kan / Yean (CAM); W 5–0	Maeda / Maruyama (JPN); L 0–5	2	Bhandari / Chaudhary (NEP); W 5–1	Uematsu / Tenma (JPN); L 2–5	Did not advance		5
Rizky Laluyan; Allif Nafiiah	Doubles	Lin / Chiang (TPE); L 2–5	Khan / Bashir (PAK); W 5–0	–	2	Maeda / Maruyama (JPN); L 0–5	Did not advance			9

== Sport climbing ==
Indonesia is fielding nine athletes to compete in the boulder, lead, and speed events at the Games.

Boulder

Athlete	Event	Semi-finals		Final	
Athlete	Event	Score	Rank	Score	Rank
Raviandi Ramadhan	Men's	44.7	9	Did not advance	
Ravianto Ramadhan	Men's	34.6	12	Did not advance	

Lead

Athlete	Event	Semi-final		Final	
Athlete	Event	Score	Rank	Score	Rank
Putra Tri Ramadani	Men's	36	3 Q	32+	5
Raviandi Ramadhan	Men's	23	7 Q	23+	8
Alma Ariella Tsany	Women's	39+	=6 Q	35+	5
Sukma Lintang Cahyani	Women's	39+	=6 Q	28+	8

Speed

Athlete	Event	Qualification		Quarter-finals		Semi-finals		Final	
Athlete	Event	Time	Rank	Time	Rank	Time	Rank	Time	Rank
Veddriq Leonardo	Men's	4.78	5 Q	5.29	1 Q	4.95	3	Did not advance	6
Aditya Tri Syahria	Men's	4.62 GR	1 Q	4.83	1 Q	4.786	1 Q	FS	4
Desak Made Rita Kusuma Dewi	Women's	6.29	3 Q	6.399	1 Q	6.36	1 Q	6.062 AR	1st place, gold medalist(s)
Berthdigna Devi Surya Kusuma	Women's	6.49	5 Q	6.73	2 Q	6.57	3	Did not advance	5

== Squash ==
Athlete	Event	Round of 32	Round of 16	Quarter-finals	Semi-finals	Final	Rank
Satria Bagus Laksana	Men's singles	Endo (JPN); L 0–3	Did not advance				
Raifa Putri Yattaqi	Women's singles	Yeung (MAC); L 2–3	Did not advance				

== Surfing ==
Indonesia sent four surfers to compete in the shortboard event of surfing at the Games. The surfing team is coached by Dylan Amartha.

Athlete	Event	Round 1		Round 2	Round 3	Quarter-finals	Semi-finals	Final / BM	
Athlete	Event	Score	Rank	Opposition Result	Opposition Result	Opposition Result	Opposition Result	Opposition Result	Rank
Pajar Ariyana	Men's shortboard	8.17	1 R3	Bye	Johnson (THA); W 11.50–8.50	Wu (CHN); W 12.67–11.66	Alciso (PHI); W 13.60–12.37	Igarashi (JPN); L 10.42–12.87	2nd place, silver medalist(s)
Bronson Meydi	Men's shortboard	9.84	1 R3	Bye	Jun (KOR); W 10.16–6.80	Igarashi (JPN); L 11.33–14.00	Did not advance		
Kya Jo Heuer	Women's shortboard	5.03	2 R2	Bye	Jin (CHN); W 12.53–9.80	Nonaka (JPN); L 6.97–8.10	Did not advance		
Jasmine Michelle Studer	Women's shortboard	8.80	1 R3	Bye	Prakash (IND); W 11.64–5.93	Espanola (PHI); W 10.67–6.64	Ikeda (JPN); L 8.17–10.83	Nonaka (JPN); L 7.10–9.06	4

Qualification legend: R3 - Qualifies to elimination rounds; R2 - Qualifies to repechage round

== Swimming ==
=== Men ===
Event	Athlete	Heats		Final	
Event	Athlete	Time	Rank	Time	Rank
50 m backstroke	I Gede Siman Sudartawa	25.71	13	Did not advance	
50 m backstroke	Jason Donovan Yusuf	25.13	5 Q	25.16	6
100 m backstroke	Farrel Armandio Tangkas	56.66	16	Did not advance	
100 m backstroke	Jason Donovan Yusuf	54.89	6 Q	55.59	10
200 m backstroke	Farrel Armandio Tangkas	2:03.73	14	Did not advance	
50 m butterfly	Joe Aditya Kurniawan	24.03	15	Did not advance	
50 m butterfly	Samuel Maxson Septionus	24.62	19	Did not advance	
100 m butterfly	Joe Aditya Kurniawan	52.89	12 R	Did not advance	
50 m breaststroke	Arya Adrean Putra Haryono	28.18	16	Did not advance	
100 m breaststroke	Arya Adrean Putra Haryono	1:02.10	18	Did not advance	
200 m breaststroke	Arya Adrean Putra Haryono	2:19.73	17	Did not advance	
50 m freestyle	Samuel Maxson Septionus	22.87	20	Did not advance	
50 m freestyle	Jason Donovan Yusuf	23.45	27	Did not advance	
100 m freestyle	Kevin Erlangga Prayitno	50.46	17	Did not advance	
100 m freestyle	Samuel Maxson Septionus	50.52	19	Did not advance	
200 m freestyle	Liquor Harrison Andoko	1:49.89	12 R	Did not advance	
200 m freestyle	Made Aubrey Jaya	1:50.52	14	Did not advance	
400 m freestyle	Made Aubrey Jaya	3:57.94	15	Did not advance	
200 m individual medley	Liquor Harrison Andoko	2:06.59	20	Did not advance	
4 × 100 m medley relay	Jason Donovan Yusuf; Joe Aditya Kurniawan; Arya Adrean Putra Haryono; Kevin Erlangga Prayitno	3:38.97	4 Q	3:39.08	6
4 × 200 m freestyle relay	Liquor Harrison Andoko; Made Aubrey Jaya; Samuel Maxson Septionus; Kevin Erlangga Prayitno	7:31.66	12	Did not advance	

=== Women ===
Event	Athlete	Heats		Final	
Event	Athlete	Time	Rank	Time	Rank
50 m backstroke	Flairene Candrea	29.24	12 R	Did not advance	
50 m backstroke	Masniari Wolf	29.45	14	Did not advance	
100 m backstroke	Adelia Chantika Aulia	1:03.59	14	Did not advance	
100 m backstroke	Flairene Candrea	1:02.48	9 Q	1:02.60	10
200 m backstroke	Adelia Chantika Aulia	2:17.14	12 R	Did not advance	
50 m breaststroke	Adellia	32.31	11 R	Did not advance	
100 m breaststroke	Adellia	1:10.79	13	Did not advance	
200 m breaststroke	Adellia	2:33.34	10 Q	2:35.39	10
50 m butterfly	Nadia Aisha Nurazmi	25.62	9 Q	25.66	10
100 m butterfly	Nadia Aisha Nurazmi	1:02.61	16	Did not advance	
50 m freestyle	Adelia Chantika Aulia	26.39	16	Did not advance	
50 m freestyle	Nadia Aisha Nurazmi	25.62	9 Q	25.66	10
100 m freestyle	Nadia Aisha Nurazmi	56.53	12 R	Did not advance	
200 m freestyle	Adelia Chantika Aulia	2:04.92	11 R	Did not advance	
4 x 100 m medley relay	Adelia Chantika Aulia; Adellia; Flairene Candrea; Nadia Aisha Nurazmi	4:15.90	8 Q	Withdraw	

=== Mixed ===
Event	Athlete	Heats		Final	
Event	Athlete	Time	Rank	Time	Rank
4 × 100 m medley relay	Joe Aditya Kurniawan; Arya Adrean Putra Haryono; Adelia Aulia Chantika; Flairene Candrea	3:54.40	6 Q	3:54.49	6

== Table tennis ==
Singles

Athlete	Event	Round 64	Round 32	Round 16	Quarter-finals	Semi-finals	Final	
Athlete	Event	Opposition Score	Opposition Score	Opposition Score	Opposition Score	Opposition Score	Opposition Score	Rank
Muhammad Naufal Junindra	Men's	Ahussein (QAT); L 0–4	Did not advance					
Muhammad Negara	Men's	Chan (HKG); L 1–4	Did not advance					
Citra Rasmi	Women's	Ashtari (IRI); W 4–1	Shin (KOR); L 0–4	Did not advance				
Almaira Nebuchadnezzar	Women's	Iloukhani (IRI); L 3–4	Did not advance					

Doubles

Athlete	Event	Round 64	Round 32	Round 16	Quarter-finals	Semi-finals	Final	
Athlete	Event	Opposition Score	Opposition Score	Opposition Score	Opposition Score	Opposition Score	Opposition Score	Rank
Gusti Syaiful Desrizal; Muhammad Kahfi Inzaghi	Men's	Ri / U (PRK); L 0–3	Did not advance					
Affan Pratama; Muhammad Negara	Men's	Abdulhussein / Ahussein (QAT); W 3–0	Gnanesekaran / Desai (IND); L 2–3	Did not advance				
Ni Ketut Maharani; Komang Sudarnita	Women's	Abboud / Zaza (SYR); W 3–0	Lee / Su (HKG); L 0–3	Did not advance				
Cindy Marcella Putri; Citra Rasmi	Women's	Nazim / Ali (MDV); W 3–2	Akasheva / Mirkadirova (KAZ); W 3–2	Ser / Loy (SGP); L 0–3	Did not advance			

Mixed

Athlete	Event	Round 64	Round 32	Round 16	Quarter-finals	Semi-finals	Final	
Athlete	Event	Opposition Score	Opposition Score	Opposition Score	Opposition Score	Opposition Score	Opposition Score	Rank
Muhammad Naufal Junindra; Almaira Nebuchadnezzar	Doubles	Bye	Sanguansin / Paranang (THA); L 0–3	Did not advance				
Affan Pratama; Cindy Marcella	Doubles	Iloukhani / Faraji (IRI); W 3–2	Oh / Kim (KOR); L 1–3	Did not advance				

Team

Athlete	Event	Preliminary				Round 16	Quarter-finals	Semi-finals	Final	
Athlete	Event	Opposition Score	Opposition Score	Opposition Score	Rank	Opposition Score	Opposition Score	Opposition Score	Opposition Score	Rank
Muhammad Naufal Junindra; Muhammad Negara; Gusti Syaiful Desrizal; Muhammad Kahfi Inzaghi; Affan Pratama	Men's	India (IND); L 0–3	Pakistan (PAK); W 3–0	Iran (IRI); L 0–3	3	Did not advance				
Citra Rasmi; Almaira Nebuchadnezzar; Ni Ketut Maharani; Komang Sudarnita; Cindy Marcella Putri	Women's	India (IND); L 0–3	Pakistan (PAK); W 3–0	Singapore (SGP); L 0–3	3	Did not advance				

== Taekwondo ==
The Asian Taekwondo Union announced that three taekwondo practitioners have qualified for the Games.

Kyorugi

Athlete	Event	Round of 16	Quarter-finals	Semi-finals	Final	
Athlete	Event	Opposition Score	Opposition Score	Opposition Score	Opposition Score	Rank
Kaiva Zhafif Putrawitama	Men's −68 kg	Kosimkhojiev (UZB); L 0–2	Did not advance			
Muhammad Raihan Fadhila	Men's −80 kg	Hamedi (KSA); W 2–0	Jaysunov (UZB); L 0–2	Did not advance		

Poomsae

Athlete	Event	Semi-finals	Final	
Athlete	Event	Opposition Score	Opposition Score	Rank
Andi Sultan Altaf Mirza	Men's individual	8.6900	Did not advance	6

== Tennis ==
The Indonesian contingent entered 9 tennis players at the Games.

Men

Athlete	Event	Round of 64	Round of 32	Round of 16	Quarter-finals	Semi-finals	Final	
Athlete	Event	Opposition Score	Opposition Score	Opposition Score	Opposition Score	Opposition Score	Opposition Score	Rank
Muhammad Rifqi Fitriadi	Singles	—N/a	Shoaib (PAK); W 6–4, 6–4	Wu (CHN); L 1–6, 2–6	Did not advance			
Gunawan Trismuwantara	Singles	—N/a	Suresh (IND); L 5–7, 6²–7⁷	Did not advance				
Gunawan Trismuwantara; Lucky Candra Kurniawan	Doubles	—N/a	Al-Mashni / Alkotop (JOR); W 6–3, 7⁸–6⁶	Isaro / Jones (THA); L 2–6, 4–6	Did not advance			

Women

Athlete	Event	Round of 64	Round of 32	Round of 16	Quarter-finals	Semi-finals	Final	
Athlete	Event	Opposition Score	Opposition Score	Opposition Score	Opposition Score	Opposition Score	Opposition Score	Rank
Anjali Kirana Junarto	Singles	Wang (CHN); L 0–6, 0–6	Did not advence					
Meydiana Reinnamah	Singles	Yang (TPE); L 0–6, 0–6	Did not advence					
Anjali Kirana Junarto; Meydiana Laviola Reinnamah	Doubles	Aludo / Madis (PHI); L 3–6, 6⁴–7⁷	Did not advence					

Mixed

Athlete	Event	Round of 32	Round of 16	Quarter-finals	Semi-finals	Final	
Athlete	Event	Opposition Score	Opposition Score	Opposition Score	Opposition Score	Opposition Score	Rank
Aldila Sutjiadi; Christopher Rungkat	Doubles	Bista / Shrestha (NEP); W 6–1, 6–1	Wu / Guo (CHN); L 6³–7⁷, 3–6	Did not advence			

== Teqball ==
Singles

Athlete	Event	Group stage						Quarter-final	Semi-finals / R	Final / BM	
Athlete	Event	Opposition Score	Opposition Score	Opposition Score	Opposition Score	Opposition Score	Rank	Opposition Score	Opposition Score	Opposition Score	Rank
Yoga Ardika Putra	Men's singles	Bá (VIE); W 7–12, 12–11, 12–8	Alisa (LAO); W 12–5, 12–6	Lee (KOR); L 1–12, 3–12	Wase (JPN); W 6–12, 12–9, 15–13	Agustin (PHI); W 12–8, 12–8	2 Q	Saw (MYA); L 7–12, 8–12	Wase (JPN); W 12–3, 12–11	Zaid (KUW); W 0–RET	3rd place, bronze medalist(s)
Sumaya	Women's singles	Dandal (LBN); W 12–9, 12–11	Khin Hnin (MYA); L 10–12, 8–12	Otorbaeva (KGZ); W 6–12, 12–6, 12–6	—N/a		2 Q	Koemyean (CAM); W 12–8, 12–7	Dsouza (IND); W 7–12, 12–9, 12–7	Khin Hnin (MYA); L 12–10, 8–12, 9–12	2nd place, silver medalist(s)

Doubles

Team	Event	Group stage				Quarter-finals	Semi-finals / R	Final / BM	
Team	Event	Opposition Score	Opposition Score	Opposition Score	Rank	Opposition Score	Opposition Score	Opposition Score	Rank
La Ode Mardan; Husni Uba	Men's doubles	Thaosiri / Chanliang (THA); L 3–12, 10–12	Montenegro / Pacis (PHI); W 12–5, 7–12, 12–7	—N/a	2 Q	Ahmad / Al-Qattan (KUW); L 9–12, 6–12	Nodomi / Arai (JPN); W 12–4, 12–7	Ahmad / Al-Qattan (KUW); L 5–12, 12–7, 10–12	4

== Triathlon ==
Individual

Athlete	Event	Time						Rank
Athlete	Event	Swim (0.75 km)	Trans 1	Bike (20 km)	Trans 2	Run (5 km)	Total	Rank
Rashif Amila Yaqin	Men	9:12	0:36	28:49	0:24	16:08	55:09	11
Muhammad Noval Ashidiq	Men	9:10	0:38	28:50	0:19	17:38	56:35	16
Martina Ayu Pratiwi	Women	10:02	0:39	30:04	0:16	17:58	58:59	4
Kayla Nadia Shafa	Women	10:18	0:41	31:59	0:20	19:24	1:02:42	14

Relay

Athlete	Event	Time						Rank
Athlete	Event	Swim (300 m)	Trans 1	Bike (6.6 km)	Trans 2	Run (1 km)	Total	Rank
Martina Ayu Pratiwi	Mixed	4:25	0:46	10:20	0:22	6:48	22:41	—N/a
Hauqalah Fakhal Arvyello	Mixed	4:07	0:45	10:01	0:21	6:57	22:11	—N/a
Kayla Nadia Shafa	Mixed	4:46	0:51	11:26	0:23	7:19	24:45	—N/a
Rashif Amila Yaqin	Mixed	4:09	0:46	10:03	0:24	6:01	21:23	—N/a
Total	Mixed	—N/a					1:31:00	5

== Volleyball ==
=== Beach ===
Team	Event	Group stage				Round of 16	Quarter-finals	Semi-finals	Final / BM	
Team	Event	Oppositions Score	Oppositions Score	Oppositions Score	Rank	Oppositions Score	Oppositions Score	Oppositions Score	Oppositions Score	Rank
Bintang Akbar; Sofyan Rachman Effendi	Men's	Nguyễn / Trần (VIE); W 21–18, 21–15	Batmunkh / Bat-enkh (MGL); W 21–8, 21–6	Buytrago / Rosales (PHI); W 21–11, 21–13	1 Q	Aljalaboubi / Al-hashimi (OMA); W 22–20, 21–18	Song / Wang (CHN); W 21–19, 21–18	Kurosawa / Mizumachi (JPN); W 21–19, 21–18	Samba / Janko (QAT); L 21–19, 16–21, 8–15	2nd place, silver medalist(s)
Fairuz Bayhaqly; Imam Ahmad Faizal	Men's	Bogatu / Gurin (KAZ); L 24–22, 19–21, 12–15	Lee CH / Lee LF (HKG); W 21–18, 21–19	Bae I-h / Yeo M-s (KOR); W 21–16, 21–14	2 Q	Wu / Zhou (CHN); L 13–21, 11–21	Did not advance			

=== Indoor ===
Team	Event	Group stage				Quarter-finals / Pl.	Semi-finals / Pl.	Final / BM / Pl.	
Team	Event	Oppositions Score	Oppositions Score	Oppositions Score	Rank	Oppositions Score	Oppositions Score	Oppositions Score	Rank
Indonesia men's	Men's tournament	Thailand; L 2–3	Kyrgyzstan; W 3–0	Iran; L 2–3	3 Pl.	Philippines; W 3–1	Vietnam; L 1–3	Kazakhstan; L 1–3	12
Indonesia women's	Women's tournament	Nepal; W 3–0	Japan; L 1–3	—N/a	2 Q	Thailand; L 0–3	Vietnam; W 3–0	Chinese Taipei; L 0–3	6

==== Men's tournament ====
Team roster

Pool B

Pos	Team	Pld	W	L	Pts	SW	SL	SR	SPW	SPL	SPR	Qualification
1	Iran	3	3	0	8	9	2	4.500	260	203	1.281	Quarterfinals
2	Thailand	3	2	1	5	6	5	1.200	244	246	0.992	Quarterfinals
3	Indonesia	3	1	2	5	7	6	1.167	301	289	1.042	Classification 9th–16th
4	Kyrgyzstan	3	0	3	0	0	9	0.000	160	227	0.705	Classification 9th–16th

Source: asiangames2026.org
Rules for classification: Tiebreakers

Date	Time	Venue		Score		Set 1	Set 2	Set 3	Set 4	Set 5	Total	Report
27 Sep	16:00	Okazaki	Indonesia	2–3	Thailand	23–25	25–20	23–25	25–23	23–25	119–118	Boxscore
28 Sep	10:00	Okazaki	Indonesia	3–0	Kyrgyzstan	27–25	25–21	25–15			77–61	Boxscore
29 Sep	16:00	Okazaki	Iran	3–2	Indonesia	22–25	21–25	25–21	25–19	17–15	110–105	Boxscore

Classification 9th–16th

Date	Time		Score		Set 1	Set 2	Set 3	Set 4	Set 5	Total	Attd	Report
1 Oct	19:00	Philippines	1–3	Indonesia	23–25	26–24	22–25	21–25		92–99	428	P2 Report

Classification 9th–12th

Date	Time		Score		Set 1	Set 2	Set 3	Set 4	Set 5	Total	Attd	Report
2 Oct	19:00	Vietnam	3–1	Indonesia	25–19	25–23	21–25	25–22		96–89	577	P2 Report

11th place match

Date	Time		Score		Set 1	Set 2	Set 3	Set 4	Set 5	Total	Attd	Report
3 Oct	16:00	Kazakhstan	3–1	Indonesia	23–25	25–23	25–18	25–20		98–86	794	P2 Report

==== Women's tournament ====
Team roster

The following is the Indonesia roster in the women's volleyball tournament of the 2026 Asian Games.

Head coach: (Japan) Marcos Sugiyama

No.	Pos.	Name	Date of birth	Height	Spike	Block	2026 club
2	MB	Maradanti Namira Tegariani	1 May 2006	180 cm (5 ft 11 in)	315 cm (10 ft 4 in)	305 cm (10 ft 0 in)	(Indonesia) Yuso Yogyakarta
3	OH	Tina Syifa Sabila Salim	15 July 2009	174 cm (5 ft 9 in)	295 cm (9 ft 8 in)	290 cm (9 ft 6 in)	(Indonesia) Rajawali 02C
4	MB	Chelsa Berliana Nurtomo	24 June 2007	187 cm (6 ft 2 in)	277 cm (9 ft 1 in)	265 cm (8 ft 8 in)	(Indonesia) Bharata Muda
5	OH	Mediol Stiovanny Yoku	1 September 1999	169 cm (5 ft 7 in)	285 cm (9 ft 4 in)	270 cm (8 ft 10 in)	Gresik Petrokimia Pupuk Indonesia
8	OH	Putri Nur Hidayanti Agustin	17 August 2004	179 cm (5 ft 10 in)	284 cm (9 ft 4 in)	275 cm (9 ft 0 in)	Gresik Petrokimia Pupuk Indonesia
10	L	Indah Guretno Dwi Margiani	2 March 2005	165 cm (5 ft 5 in)	289 cm (9 ft 6 in)	267 cm (8 ft 9 in)	(Indonesia) Surabaya Bank Jatim
11	OH	Ersandrina Devega	16 December 1999	170 cm (5 ft 7 in)	270 cm (8 ft 10 in)	263 cm (8 ft 8 in)	(Indonesia) Jakarta TNI AU
15	MB	Geofanny Cahyaningtyas	7 May 2005	175 cm (5 ft 9 in)	283 cm (9 ft 3 in)	275 cm (9 ft 0 in)	Gresik Petrokimia Pupuk Indonesia
16	S	Ajeng Nur Cahaya	16 June 2006	167 cm (5 ft 6 in)	265 cm (8 ft 8 in)	262 cm (8 ft 7 in)	Gresik Petrokimia Pupuk Indonesia
21	OP	Azzahra Dwi Febyane	1 February 2007	177 cm (5 ft 10 in)	295 cm (9 ft 8 in)	290 cm (9 ft 6 in)	(Indonesia) Bharata Muda
23	OP	Khanza Putri Yansi	4 September 2010	180 cm (5 ft 11 in)	290 cm (9 ft 6 in)	290 cm (9 ft 6 in)	(Indonesia) Medan Falcons
24	S	Arneta Putri Amelian	2 May 2002	173 cm (5 ft 8 in)	300 cm (9 ft 10 in)	290 cm (9 ft 6 in)	(Indonesia) Surabaya Bank Jatim

Pool A

Pos	Team	Pld	W	L	Pts	SW	SL	SR	SPW	SPL	SPR	Qualification
1	Japan (H)	2	2	0	6	6	1	6.000	173	111	1.559	Quarterfinals
2	Indonesia	2	1	1	3	4	3	1.333	155	151	1.026	Quarterfinals
3	Nepal	2	0	2	0	0	6	0.000	84	150	0.560	Classification 9th–14th

Source: asiangames2026.org
Rules for classification: Tiebreakers
(H) Host

Date	Time		Score		Set 1	Set 2	Set 3	Set 4	Set 5	Total	Attd	Report
17 Sep	19:20	Indonesia	3–0	Nepal	25–12	25–21	25–20			75–53	550	Boxscore
18 Sep	19:20	Indonesia	1–3	Japan	19–25	13–25	25–23	23–25		80–98	1583	Boxscore

Quarter-finals

Date	Time		Score		Set 1	Set 2	Set 3	Set 4	Set 5	Total	Attd	Report
20 Sep	10:00	Thailand	3–0	Indonesia	25–10	29–27	25–16			79–53	648	P2 Report

Classification 5th–8th

Date	Time		Score		Set 1	Set 2	Set 3	Set 4	Set 5	Total	Attd	Report
21 Sep	13:30	Indonesia	3–0	Vietnam	25–20	25–21	25–18			75–59	1,622	P2 Report

5th place match

Date	Time		Score		Set 1	Set 2	Set 3	Set 4	Set 5	Total	Attd	Report
22 Sep	13:00	Chinese Taipei	3–0	Indonesia	25–15	25–20	25–11			75–46	800	P2 Report

== Weightlifting ==
Indonesia entered 8 lifters to the Games.

Men

Athlete	Event	Snatch	Clean & Jerk	Total	Rank
Athlete	Event	Result	Result	Total	Rank
Ricko Saputra	−60 kg	130 kg	168 kg	298 kg	4
Eko Yuli Irawan	−65 kg	135 kg	167 kg	302 kg	4
Rahmat Erwin Abdullah	−75 kg	160 kg	206 kg WR	366 kg WR	1st place, gold medalist(s)

Women

Athlete	Event	Snatch	Clean & Jerk	Total	Rank
Athlete	Event	Result	Result	Total	Rank
Luluk Diana Tri Wijayana	−49 kg	88 kg	103 kg	191 kg	3rd place, bronze medalist(s)
Juliana Klarisa	−53 kg	80 kg	104 kg	184 kg	10
Natasya Beteyob	−61 kg	98 kg	122 kg	220 kg	6
Indah Afriza	−69 kg	97 kg	126 kg	223 kg	5

Legend:
WR - World Record

== Wrestling ==
The Wrestling Association of Indonesia entered five wrestler to compete in the Games.

Key:

- F – Victory by fall.
- PP – Decision by points – the loser with technical points.
- PO – Decision by points – the loser without technical points.
- ST – Great superiority – the loser without technical points and a margin of victory of at least 8 (Greco-Roman) or 10 (freestyle) points.

Men's freestyle

Athlete	Event	Round 16	Quarterfinal	Semi-final / R	Final / BM	
Athlete	Event	Opposition Result	Opposition Result	Opposition Result	Opposition Result	Rank
Gilang Ilhaza	74 kg	Aoyagi (JPN); L 0–10	Did not advance	Rassadin (TJK); L 0–10	Did not advance	

Men's Greco-Roman

Athlete	Event	Round 16	Quarterfinal	Repechage	Final / BM	
Athlete	Event	Opposition Result	Opposition Result	Opposition Result	Opposition Result	Rank
Muhammad Aliansyah	67 kg	Namsrai (MGL); L 8–11	Did not advance			
Andika Sulaeman	77 kg	Baucas (PHI); W 9–0	Abdevali (IRI); L 0–8	—N/a	Badaghimofrad (QAT); L 0–8	4

Women's freestyle

Athlete	Event	Round 16	Quarter-final	semi-final / R	Final / BM	
Athlete	Event	Opposition Result	Opposition Result	Opposition Result	Opposition Result	Rank
Mutoharoh	57 kg	Sobirova (UZB); L 0–10	Did not advance			
Varadisa Septi Putri Hidayat	76 kg	Bye	Medet Kyzy (KGZ); L 0–10	Did not advance		

== Wushu ==
The Indonesia Wushu Federation prepared 13 wushu practitioners to compete in the sanda and taolu event.

=== Taolu ===
Athlete	Event	Event 1		Event 2		Total	Rank
Athlete	Event	Result	Rank	Result	Rank	Total	Rank
Seraf Naro Siregar	Men's changquan	9.720	3	—N/a		9.720	3rd place, bronze medalist(s)
Ahmad Ghozali Fuaiz	Men's nanquan & nangun	9.696	10	9.693	8	19.389	7
Terrence Tjahyadi	Men's nanquan & nangun	9.703	8	9.710	10	19.413	5
Rainer Reinaldy Ferdiansyah	Men's taijiquan & taijijian	9.706	7	9.690	9	19.396	7
Eugenia Diva Widodo	Women's changquan	9.706	3	—N/a		9.706	3rd place, bronze medalist(s)
Andrea Simon	Women's changquan	9.603	12	—N/a		9.603	12
Patricia Geraldine	Women's jianshu & qiangshu	9.703	3	9.596	5	19.299	5

=== Sanda ===
Athlete	Event	Round of 32	Round of 16	Quarter-finals	Semi-finals	Final	
Athlete	Event	Opposition Score	Opposition Score	Opposition Score	Opposition Score	Opposition Score	Rank
Fereddy Sinaga	Men's –56 kg	—N/a	Bye	Erdenebayar (MGL); W WPD	Dinh (VIE); L 0–2	Did not advance	3rd place, bronze medalist(s)
Bintang Guitara	Men's –60 kg	—N/a	Bye	Annamyradov (TKM); W WPD	Leung (HKG); L 1–2	Did not advance	3rd place, bronze medalist(s)
Samuel Marbun	Men's –65 kg	Bye	Koskenov (KAZ); W 2–0	Ashrafi (AFG); L 0–2	Did not advance		
Jumanta	Men's –70 kg	—N/a	Kamolzoda (TJK); W 2–0	Hotak (AFG); L 0–2	Did not advance		
Tharisa Dea Florentina	Women's –52 kg	—N/a	Kilapio (PHI); W 2–0	Akter (BAN); L WIS	Did not advance		
Thania Kusumaningtyas	Women's –60 kg	—N/a	Rustambek Kyzy (KGZ); W 2–0	Azatova (UZB); W 2–0	Naorem (IND); L 0–2	Did not advance	3rd place, bronze medalist(s)

== See also ==
- Indonesia at the 2026 Asian Para Games
