= Women's basketball leagues in Indonesia =

Women basketball in Indonesia

- Governing body: Indonesian Basketball Association

Club competitions
- Kobanita (1990s–1992, 1996–2008); WNBL Indonesia (2011–2015); WIBL (2016); Srikandi Cup (2017–2020)

The Indonesian Basketball Association has not organized a women's basketball domestic league in Indonesia since 2020.

== History ==
The Indonesian Basketball Association (Perbasi) established the Women's Premier Basketball Competition (Kobanita) in the 1990s, the first women's basketball league in Indonesia. It was dissolved in 1992 before returning in 1996.

However the league experienced financial issues with teams withdrawing from the Kobanita. The Kobanita only had six teams in its last season in 2008. Mahaputri BritAma Jakarta were the last champions who began their title streak in 2002. Their seventh title in 2008, surpassed the record by Cahaya Lestari Surabaya (CLS) which won six titles in the Kobanita.

The Women's National Basketball League (WNBL) Indonesia was established in 2011 with its last season being in 2014–15. The Women Indonesia Basketball League (WIBL) held its sole season in 2016.

The Srikandi Cup then succeeded the WIBL in 2017. Its last season, the 2019–20 Srikandi Cup was suspended on March 2020 due to the COVID-19 pandemic then eventually cancelled in November 2020.

The Perbasi attempted to reestablish a women's league in 2022.

== List of champions ==
=== Women's National Basketball League (WNBL) ===
Year	Champions	Finals result	Runners-up	Ref.
2011–12	Surabaya Fever	81–58	Tomang Sakti Mighty Bees Jakarta	
2012–13	Tomang Sakti Mighty Bees Jakarta	61–47	Surabaya Fever	
2013–14	Tomang Sakti Mighty Bees Jakarta	56–54	Sahabat Semarang	
2014–15	Surabaya Fever	65–53	Sahabat Semarang	

=== Women's Indonesian Basketball League (WIBL) ===
Year	Champions	Finals result	Runners-up	Ref.
2016	Surabaya Fever	2–0 (58–42, 63–51); Best of three	Tomang Sakti Merpati Bali	

=== Srikandi Cup ===
Year	Champions	Finals result	Runners-up	Ref.
2017	Surabaya Fever	64–54	Sahabat Semarang	
2017–18	Surabaya Fever	61–47	Merpati Bali	
2018–19	Merpati Bali	66–45	Sahabat Semarang	
2020	Cancelled			
