= Padel at the 2026 Asian Games =

- Venue: Higashi Sports Center
- Dates: 28 September – 3 October 2026
- Competitors: 86 from 13 nations

Padel at the 2026 Asian Games was held from 28 September to 3 October 2026 at the Higashi Sports Center. This marked the sport's debut at the Asian Games.

20 men's pairs and 23 women's pairs from 13 NOCs participated. Qatar won the men's pairs gold medal while Japan won the women's competition.

== Schedule ==
P	Preliminary rounds	¼	Quarterfinals	½	Semifinals	F	Finals

Event↓/Date →	28th Mon	29th Tue	30th Wed	1st Thu	2nd Fri	3rd Sat
Men's pairs	P	P	P	¼	½	F
Women's pairs	P	P	P	¼	½	F

== Medalists ==
Event	Gold	Silver	Bronze
Men's pairs	Qatar; Mashari Naif; Rashed Naif	Malaysia; Christian Didier Chin; Aidan Yunus	Iran; Farsad Shahi; Amir Mohammad Jamshidi
Women's pairs	Japan; Saki Tsukamoto; Kae Tokumoto	Indonesia; Fadona Kusumawati; Fitriani Sabatini	Indonesia; Novela Rezha; Beatrice Gumulya

== Medal table ==
Rank	Nation	Gold	Silver	Bronze	Total
1	Japan (JPN)	1	0	0	1
1	Qatar (QAT)	1	0	0	1
3	Indonesia (INA)	0	1	1	2
4	Malaysia (MAS)	0	1	0	1
5	Iran (IRI)	0	0	1	1
Totals (5 entries)		2	2	2	6

== Participating nations ==
A total of 86 athletes from 13 nations competed in padel at the 2026 Asian Games:

- Hong Kong (8)
- Indonesia (8)
- Iran (8)
- Japan (8)
- Kazakhstan (8)
- Kuwait (8)
- Lebanon (4)
- Malaysia (4)
- Philippines (8)
- Qatar (8)
- Saudi Arabia (4)
- Thailand (4)
- United Arab Emirates (6)
