= Surfing at the 2026 Asian Games – Men's shortboard =

Men's shortboard at the 2026 Asian Games
- Venue: Long Beach, Tahara
- Date: 25–29 September 2026
- Competitors: 23 from 14 nations

Medalists
gold medal	Kanoa Igarashi	Japan
silver medal	I Made Pajar Ariyana	Indonesia
bronze medal	Jayuard Alciso	Philippines

The men's shortboard competition at the 2026 Asian Games took place from 25 to 29 September 2026 at Long Beach in Tahara, Aichi Prefecture, Japan. It was the first time that surfing was contested at the Asian Games, with the men's and women's shortboard events making their debuts.

Japan's Kanoa Igarashi, a two-time Olympian and the silver medallist at the Tokyo 2020 Olympics, won the gold medal, defeating Indonesia's I Made Pajar Ariyana 12.87 to 10.40 in the gold medal match to secure a provisional quota place for Japan at the 2028 Olympics . The Philippines' Jayuard Alciso claimed the bronze medal after beating compatriot Toby Espejon 11.64 to 8.90 in an all-Filipino bronze medal match.

== Competition format ==
The competition consisted of six rounds. Each surfer's two highest-scoring waves counted towards their heat total, with each wave scored from 0.1 to 10 on the basis of the difficulty, innovation and progression, variety, combination, speed, power and flow of the manoeuvres performed.

- Round 1: 8 heats of three surfers each (one heat contained only two surfers). The winner of each heat (8 surfers) advanced directly to Round 3, while the remaining surfers (15) moved to Round 2, the first elimination round.
- Round 2: 8 heats of two surfers each, one of which was a bye. The winner of each heat advanced to Round 3, while the loser was eliminated.
- Round 3 (round of 16): 8 heats of two surfers each; the winner advanced to the quarter-finals.
- Quarter-finals: 4 heats of two surfers each; the winner advanced to the semi-finals.
- Semi-finals: 2 heats of two surfers each; the winners advanced to the gold medal match and the losers to the bronze medal match.
- Finals: the gold medal match and the bronze medal match.

== Schedule ==
All times are Japan Standard Time (UTC+09:00).

Date	Time	Round
Friday, 25 September 2026	13:54	Round 1
Sunday, 27 September 2026	09:20	Round 2
Monday, 28 September 2026	07:00	Round 3
Tuesday, 29 September 2026	07:00	Quarter-finals
Tuesday, 29 September 2026	10:44	Semi-finals
Tuesday, 29 September 2026	12:56	Finals

== Results ==
=== Round 1 ===
The first round was non-elimination. Surfers were drawn into eight heats of three surfers each, with the top surfer advancing straight to Round 3 and the bottom two surfers going to Round 2.

==== Heat 1 ====
Rank	Athlete	Waves		Total score	Notes
Rank	Athlete	1	2	Total score	Notes
1	Wu Shidong (CHN)	6.00	3.93	9.93	R3
2	Yasin Ahmed Nashid (MDV)	4.40	4.10	8.50	R2
3	Tinn Johnson (THA)	4.00	2.63	6.63	R2

==== Heat 2 ====
Rank	Athlete	Waves		Total score	Notes
Rank	Athlete	1	2	Total score	Notes
1	Connor Karasawa (JPN)	8.67	5.23	13.90	R3
2	Kanoa Igarashi (JPN)	6.27	5.50	11.77	R2
3	Kayan Abdulla Areef (MDV)	2.83	2.60	5.43	R2

==== Heat 3 ====
Rank	Athlete	Waves		Total score	Notes
Rank	Athlete	1	2	Total score	Notes
1	Kishore Kumar Anbarasu (IND)	5.33	4.00	9.33	R3
2	Ma Wensong (CHN)	4.03	3.40	7.43	R2
3	Rayan Hakawati (LBN)	1.70	1.37	3.07	R2

==== Heat 4 ====
Rank	Athlete	Waves		Total score	Notes
Rank	Athlete	1	2	Total score	Notes
1	Bronson Meydi (INA)	5.17	4.67	9.84	R3
2	Natthakron Sae-iew (THA)	3.87	3.67	7.54	R2

==== Heat 5 ====
Rank	Athlete	Waves		Total score	Notes
Rank	Athlete	1	2	Total score	Notes
1	I Made Pajar Ariyana (INA)	4.17	4.00	8.17	R3
2	Mohammad Mannan (BAN)	3.17	2.57	5.74	R2
3	Afridun Amu (AFG)	1.27	1.17	2.44	R2

==== Heat 6 ====
Rank	Athlete	Waves		Total score	Notes
Rank	Athlete	1	2	Total score	Notes
1	Toby Espejon (PHI)	6.33	4.00	10.33	R3
2	Lucas Santiago Wehle (MAS)	2.37	2.23	4.60	R2
3	Christopher Dirany (LBN)	1.60	1.37	2.97	R2

==== Heat 7 ====
Rank	Athlete	Waves		Total score	Notes
Rank	Athlete	1	2	Total score	Notes
1	Kanoa Heejae Palmiano (KOR)	5.50	4.33	9.83	R3
2	Nuchitha Mahawidanage (SRI)	4.93	4.00	8.93	R2
3	Davoud Khadir (IRI)	1.73	0.83	2.56	R2

==== Heat 8 ====
Rank	Athlete	Waves		Total score	Notes
Rank	Athlete	1	2	Total score	Notes
1	Jayuard Alciso (PHI)	4.67	4.53	9.20	R3
2	Sivaraj Babu (IND)	3.53	3.50	7.03	R2
3	Jun Seo-hyun (KOR)	3.03	2.73	5.76	R2

=== Round 2 ===
In the second round surfers were drawn into eight heats of two surfers each, with the winner advancing to Round 3 (round of 16) and the loser being eliminated. Because only 15 surfers progressed from Round 1, Heat 5 was a bye, with Kanoa Igarashi advancing automatically.

==== Heat 1 ====
Rank	Athlete	Waves		Total score	Notes
Rank	Athlete	1	2	Total score	Notes
1	Sivaraj Babu (IND)	4.83	4.13	8.96	R3
2	Davoud Khadir (IRI)	1.87	1.73	3.60	E

==== Heat 2 ====
Rank	Athlete	Waves		Total score	Notes
Rank	Athlete	1	2	Total score	Notes
1	Jun Seo-hyun (KOR)	6.50	5.00	11.50	R3
2	Nuchitha Mahawidanage (SRI)	4.17	3.17	7.34	E

==== Heat 3 ====
Rank	Athlete	Waves		Total score	Notes
Rank	Athlete	1	2	Total score	Notes
1	Tinn Johnson (THA)	4.97	4.43	9.40	R3
2	Mohammad Mannan (BAN)	4.50	4.00	8.50	E

==== Heat 4 ====
Rank	Athlete	Waves		Total score	Notes
Rank	Athlete	1	2	Total score	Notes
1	Yasin Ahmed Nashid (MDV)	4.13	4.00	8.13	R3
2	Afridun Amu (AFG)	1.07	1.07	2.14	E

==== Heat 5 ====
Rank	Athlete	Waves		Total score	Notes
Rank	Athlete	1	2	Total score	Notes
—	Kanoa Igarashi (JPN)	—	—	—	Bye

==== Heat 6 ====
Rank	Athlete	Waves		Total score	Notes
Rank	Athlete	1	2	Total score	Notes
1	Natthakron Sae-iew (THA)	6.50	4.70	11.20	R3
2	Kayan Abdulla Areef (MDV)	3.17	2.50	5.67	E

==== Heat 7 ====
Rank	Athlete	Waves		Total score	Notes
Rank	Athlete	1	2	Total score	Notes
1	Ma Wensong (CHN)	7.77	7.33	15.10	R3
2	Christopher Dirany (LBN)	2.73	2.23	4.96	E

==== Heat 8 ====
Rank	Athlete	Waves		Total score	Notes
Rank	Athlete	1	2	Total score	Notes
1	Lucas Santiago Wehle (MAS)	3.87	3.47	7.34	R3
2	Rayan Hakawati (LBN)	2.67	2.63	5.30	E

=== Bracket ===
The bracket from the round of 16 onwards was determined by the results of rounds 1 and 2. The winner of each head-to-head heat qualified for the next round.

Round 3; 28 September
Kanoa Heejae Palmiano (KOR)	9.80
Natthakron Sae-iew (THA)	8.74
Jayuard Alciso (PHI)	11.50
Sivaraj Babu (IND)	7.83
Wu Shidong (CHN)	10.93
Yasin Ahmed Nashid (MDV)	8.44
I Made Pajar Ariyana (INA)	11.50
Tinn Johnson (THA)	8.50
Bronson Meydi (INA)	10.16
Jun Seo-hyun (KOR)	6.80
Kanoa Igarashi (JPN)	15.67
Connor Karasawa (JPN)	15.26
Toby Espejon (PHI)	11.83
Lucas Santiago Wehle (MAS)	6.34
Kishore Kumar Anbarasu (IND)	9.76
Ma Wensong (CHN)	8.80

Quarter-finals; 29 September
Kanoa Heejae Palmiano (KOR)	7.24
Jayuard Alciso (PHI)	10.76
Wu Shidong (CHN)	11.66
I Made Pajar Ariyana (INA)	12.67
Bronson Meydi (INA)	11.33
Kanoa Igarashi (JPN)	14.00
Toby Espejon (PHI)	8.53
Kishore Kumar Anbarasu (IND)	5.37

Semi-finals; 29 September
Jayuard Alciso (PHI)	12.37
I Made Pajar Ariyana (INA)	13.60
Kanoa Igarashi (JPN)	18.33
Toby Espejon (PHI)	5.83

Gold medal match 29 September
(gold) Kanoa Igarashi (JPN)	12.87
(silver) I Made Pajar Ariyana (INA)	10.40
Bronze medal match 29 September
(bronze) Jayuard Alciso (PHI)	11.64
Toby Espejon (PHI)	8.90

=== Round 3 ===
In the third round (round of 16) surfers were drawn into eight heats of two surfers each, with the winner advancing to the quarter-finals and the loser being eliminated.

==== Heat 1 ====
Rank	Athlete	Waves		Total score	Notes
Rank	Athlete	1	2	Total score	Notes
1	Kanoa Heejae Palmiano (KOR)	5.30	4.50	9.80	QF
2	Natthakron Sae-iew (THA)	4.47	4.27	8.74	E

==== Heat 2 ====
Rank	Athlete	Waves		Total score	Notes
Rank	Athlete	1	2	Total score	Notes
1	Jayuard Alciso (PHI)	6.00	5.50	11.50	QF
2	Sivaraj Babu (IND)	4.43	3.40	7.83	E

==== Heat 3 ====
Rank	Athlete	Waves		Total score	Notes
Rank	Athlete	1	2	Total score	Notes
1	Wu Shidong (CHN)	6.00	4.93	10.93	QF
2	Yasin Ahmed Nashid (MDV)	4.47	3.97	8.44	E

==== Heat 4 ====
Rank	Athlete	Waves		Total score	Notes
Rank	Athlete	1	2	Total score	Notes
1	I Made Pajar Ariyana (INA)	6.33	5.17	11.50	QF
2	Tinn Johnson (THA)	4.37	4.13	8.50	E

==== Heat 5 ====
Rank	Athlete	Waves		Total score	Notes
Rank	Athlete	1	2	Total score	Notes
1	Bronson Meydi (INA)	5.33	4.83	10.16	QF
2	Jun Seo-hyun (KOR)	3.50	3.30	6.80	E

==== Heat 6 ====
Rank	Athlete	Waves		Total score	Notes
Rank	Athlete	1	2	Total score	Notes
1	Kanoa Igarashi (JPN)	8.67	7.00	15.67	QF
2	Connor Karasawa (JPN)	7.93	7.33	15.26	E

==== Heat 7 ====
Rank	Athlete	Waves		Total score	Notes
Rank	Athlete	1	2	Total score	Notes
1	Toby Espejon (PHI)	6.00	5.83	11.83	QF
2	Lucas Santiago Wehle (MAS)	3.17	3.17	6.34	E

==== Heat 8 ====
Rank	Athlete	Waves		Total score	Notes
Rank	Athlete	1	2	Total score	Notes
1	Kishore Kumar Anbarasu (IND)	4.93	4.83	9.76	QF
2	Ma Wensong (CHN)	4.63	4.17	8.80	E

=== Quarter-finals ===
The men's quarter-finals took place on 29 September 2026.

==== Heat 1 ====
Rank	Athlete	Waves		Total score	Notes
Rank	Athlete	1	2	Total score	Notes
1	Jayuard Alciso (PHI)	5.83	4.93	10.76	SF
2	Kanoa Heejae Palmiano (KOR)	6.17	1.07	7.24	E

==== Heat 2 ====
Rank	Athlete	Waves		Total score	Notes
Rank	Athlete	1	2	Total score	Notes
1	I Made Pajar Ariyana (INA)	7.67	5.00	12.67	SF
2	Wu Shidong (CHN)	6.33	5.33	11.66	E

==== Heat 3 ====
Rank	Athlete	Waves		Total score	Notes
Rank	Athlete	1	2	Total score	Notes
1	Kanoa Igarashi (JPN)	7.33	6.67	14.00	SF
2	Bronson Meydi (INA)	6.00	5.33	11.33	E

==== Heat 4 ====
Rank	Athlete	Waves		Total score	Notes
Rank	Athlete	1	2	Total score	Notes
1	Toby Espejon (PHI)	5.50	3.03	8.53	SF
2	Kishore Kumar Anbarasu (IND)	3.00	2.37	5.37	E

=== Semi-finals ===
==== Heat 1 ====
Rank	Athlete	Waves		Total score	Notes
Rank	Athlete	1	2	Total score	Notes
1	I Made Pajar Ariyana (INA)	7.00	6.60	13.60	F
2	Jayuard Alciso (PHI)	6.67	5.70	12.37	3/4

==== Heat 2 ====
Rank	Athlete	Waves		Total score	Notes
Rank	Athlete	1	2	Total score	Notes
1	Kanoa Igarashi (JPN)	10.00	8.33	18.33	F
2	Toby Espejon (PHI)	4.83	1.00	5.83	3/4

=== Bronze medal match ===
Rank	Athlete	Waves		Total score	Notes
Rank	Athlete	1	2	Total score	Notes
1	Jayuard Alciso (PHI)	6.67	4.97	11.64	3rd place, bronze medalist(s)
2	Toby Espejon (PHI)	4.83	4.07	8.90	4th

=== Gold medal match ===
Rank	Athlete	Waves		Total score	Notes
Rank	Athlete	1	2	Total score	Notes
1	Kanoa Igarashi (JPN)	6.67	6.20	12.87	1st place, gold medalist(s)
2	I Made Pajar Ariyana (INA)	5.23	5.17	10.40	2nd place, silver medalist(s)
