= Merpati Bali =

- History: Tomang Sakti Merpati Bali (2015–2016); Merpati Bali (2017–present)
- Location: Denpasar, Bali Indonesia
- Championships: WNBL: (Note: As the Tomang Sakti Mighty Bees Jakarta) 2 (2012–13, 2013–14); Srikandi Cup: 1 (2018–19)

The Merpati Bali are an Indonesian basketball club which has played in the top division women's leagues of Indonesia; namely the WNBL Indonesia and WIBL.

== History ==
=== Tomang Sakti Mighty Bees ===
The Merpati Bali traces its roots to the Tomang Sakti Mighty Bees Jakarta, one of the inaugural teams of the Women's National Basketball League (WNBL) Indonesia. The Tomang Sakti Mighty Bees lost to Surabaya Fever in the inaugural 2011–12 season. The Mighty Bees overcame Fever in the succeeding 2012–13 season, will secured the 2013–14 season title by defeating Sahabat Semarang. Fever won the fourth WNBL Indonesia title in 2014–15, at the Mighty Bees' expense.

=== Merpati Bali ===
==== WIBL ====
Merpati Bali was a club formed by Deddy Setiawan to promote women's basketball in Bali as the basketball counterpart of the football club, Bali United.

In October 2015, Merpati Bali agreed to take over the Tomang Sakti Mighty Bees Jakarta and bring in its own players ahead of the 2016 Women's Indonesian Basketball League (WIBL). Under the agreement, they played as the Tomang Sakti Merpati Bali retaining part of the original club's name.

Tomang Sakti Merpati advanced to the best of three finals series with Surabaya Fever needing to play only to games to defeat the Balinese side.

==== Srikandi Cup ====
At the Srikandi Cup, the team competed as Merpati Bali. Surabaya Fever prevented Merpati from winning the 2017–18 title finishing as runners-up. They won the 2018–19 tournament defeating Sahabat Semarang.
