= Cycling at the 2026 Asian Games – Men's cross-country =

Men's cross-country at the 2026 Asian Games
- Venue: Obata Ryokuchi Park
- Date: 25 September 2026
- Competitors: 14 from 8 nations

Medalists
gold medal	Yuan Jinwei	China
silver medal	Tatsuumi Soejima	Japan
bronze medal	Feri Yudoyono	Indonesia

The men's cross country competition at the 2026 Asian Games was held on 25 September 2026 at Obata Ryokuchi Park. Yuan Jinwei of China won the gold medal, beating Tatsuumi Soejima of Japan by three seconds, while Feri Yudoyono of Indonesia took the bronze.

== Schedule ==
All times are Japan Standard Time (UTC+09:00)

Date	Time	Event
Friday, 25 September 2026	11:00	Final

== Results ==
Rank	Athlete	Time
1st place, gold medalist(s)	Yuan Jinwei (CHN)	1:25:15
2nd place, silver medalist(s)	Tatsuumi Soejima (JPN)	1:25:18
3rd place, bronze medalist(s)	Feri Yudoyono (INA)	1:25:41
4	Toki Sawada (JPN)	1:26:12
5	Denis Sergiyenko (KAZ)	1:26:25
6	Zaenal Fanani (INA)	1:27:51
7	Lyu Xianjing (CHN)	1:28:09
8	Heo Seung-soo (KOR)	1:31:22
9	Chun Sung-hun (KOR)	1:33:19
10	Phunsiri Sirimongkhon (THA)	1:34:15
11	Pongpeera Pongaryukun (THA)	−3 laps
12	Lai Chun Kin (HKG)	−3 laps
13	Yevgeniy Fedorov (KAZ)	−4 laps
14	Nawaraj Neupane (NEP)	−4 laps
