= Tatsuumi Soejima =

Japanese mountain biker

Personal information
- Born: June 19, 2003 (age 23)

Cycling career
- Sport: Cycling
- Discipline: Cross-country
Medal record
Men's mountain biking
Representing Japan
Asian Games
Silver medal – second place	2026 Aichi–Nagoya	Men's cross-country

Tatsuumi Soejima (Japanese: 副島達海; born 19 June 2003) is a Japanese mountain biker who competes in cross-country mountain biking. He represented Japan at the 2026 Asian Games, where he won the silver medal in the men's cross-country event.

== Career ==
Soejima competed in mountain-bike cross-country events from a young age and won several Japanese national championship titles in junior and under-23 categories. In July 2025, he won the men's under-23 cross-country event at the Japanese National Mountain Bike Championships. In July 2026, he won the elite men's cross-country title at the Japanese National Championships in Nagano, extending his national championship winning streak to six titles across age categories.

In 2026, Soejima competed in international mountain-bike races, including the Asian Mountain Bike Championships in Uzbekistan, where he finished sixth in the men's cross-country Olympic event. He also won cross-country events in the UCI Mountain Bike Continental Series, including the Siol International Mountain Bike Challenge in Malaysia in August 2026.

At the 2026 Asian Games in Aichi and Nagoya, Japan, Soejima competed in the men's mountain-bike cross-country event on 25 September. The race covered eight laps of a 3.7-kilometre circuit at Obata Ryokuchi Park in Nagoya. Soejima challenged China's Yuan Jinwei for the lead and finished second, three seconds behind the winner, in a time of 1 hour, 25 minutes and 18 seconds. His silver medal was one of Japan's podium finishes in cycling at the Games.
