= Mahaputri BritAma Jakarta =

- Leagues: Kobanita
- Location: Jakarta, Indonesia
- Team colors: Yellow, Blue, White
- Championships: Kobanita: at least 7 (2002, 2003, 2004, 2005, 2006, 2007, 2008)

The Mahaputri BritAma Jakarta was an Indonesian women's basketball club. They have won seven consecutive titles at the Women's Premier Basketball Competition (Kobanita) before the league and the team itself folded in 2008.

== History ==
The Mahaputri BritAma was established by Erick Thohir. Mahaputri competed in the Women's Premier Basketball Competition (Kobanita) and has dominated the last years of the tournament in the 2000s. They won their last title in the six-team 2008 season and then disbanded.

== See also ==
- Satria Muda Bandung, the men's counterpart
