= Cycling at the 2026 Asian Games – Women's cross-country =

Women's cross-country at the 2026 Asian Games
- Venue: Obata Ryokuchi Park
- Date: 24 September 2026
- Competitors: 16 from 9 nations

Medalists
gold medal	Wu Zhifan	China
silver medal	Liang Zhenglan	China
bronze medal	Sayu Bella Sukma Dewi	Indonesia

The women's cross country competition at the 2026 Asian Games was held on 24 September 2026 at Obata Ryokuchi Park. Two Chinese athletes, Wu Zhifan and Liang Zhenglan won the gold and silver medal, with Sayu Bella Sukma Dewi of Indonesia taking the bronze.

== Schedule ==
All times are Japan Standard Time (UTC+09:00)

Date	Time	Event
Thursday, 24 September 2026	11:00	Final

== Results ==
Rank	Athlete	Time
1st place, gold medalist(s)	Wu Zhifan (CHN)	1:26:14
2nd place, silver medalist(s)	Liang Zhenglan (CHN)	1:27:05
3rd place, bronze medalist(s)	Sayu Bella Sukma Dewi (INA)	1:28:00
4	Urara Kawaguchi (JPN)	1:30:57
5	Yui Ishida (JPN)	1:32:36
6	Tsai Ya-yu (TPE)	1:35:53
7	Vara Sefti Rahmadani (INA)	−1 lap
8	Tatyana Geneleva (KAZ)	−1 lap
9	Shagne Yaoyao (PHI)	−2 laps
10	Pinpak Chiengsuan (THA)	−2 laps
11	Adel Pia Sendrijas (PHI)	−2 laps
12	Usha Khanal (NEP)	−3 laps
13	Pornpak Praphothang (THA)	−3 laps
14	Yuliya Li (KAZ)	−4 laps
15	Kwan Tsz Kwan (HKG)	−4 laps
16	Yu Hoi Tik (HKG)	−4 laps
