= Wu Zhifan =

Chinese mountain biker

Personal information
- Born: 5 March 2001 (age 25) Zhaoyang, China

Cycling career
- Sport: Cycling
- Discipline: Mountain biking
Medal record
Women's mountain biking
Representing China
Asian Games
Gold medal – first place	2026 Aichi-Nagoya	Cross-country
Asian Championships
Gold medal – first place	2026 Bo'stonliq	Cross-country
Gold medal – first place	2025 Guizhou	Cross-country
Gold medal – first place	2024 Putrajaya	Cross-country

Wu Zhifan (born 5 March 2001) is a Chinese mountain biker. She competed in the women's cross-country event at the 2024 Summer Olympics.

== Major results ==
2019
2nd Cross-country, National Championships
2022
3rd Cross-country, National Championships
2024
3rd Cross-country, National Championships
