= Afridun Amu =

Afghan surfer

- Occupation: Athlete

Afridun Amu is the first Afghan athlete to internationally represent Afghanistan in surfing. He participated in the International Surfing Association World Surfing Games in Biarritz, France in May 2017. Amu also won the first official Afghan surfing championship (man) in 2015 in Ericeira, Portugal. He is the reigning Afghan surf champion.

Amu was born in Kabul, Afghanistan on June 23, 1987. He spent his childhood in Moscow, Russia, where his father worked as a diplomat. His family moved to Germany as political refugees in 1992. He graduated in law, cultural science and design thinking. He works as an expert in Constitutional law at the Max Planck Foundation for International Peace and the Rule of Law and is a lecturer on Design thinking at the Hasso Plattner Institute.
