= Padel at the 2026 Asian Games – Women's pairs =

Women's pairs at the 2026 Asian Games
- Venue: Higashi Sports Center
- Dates: 28 September – 3 October 2026
- Competitors: 46 from 13 nations

Medalists
gold medal	Saki Tsukamoto; Kae Tokumoto	Japan
silver medal	Fadona Kusumawati; Fitriani Sabatini	Indonesia
bronze medal	Novela Rezha; Beatrice Gumulya	Indonesia

The women's pairs padel tournament at the 2026 Asian Games was held from 28 September to 3 October 2026 at the Nagoya City Higashi Sports Center in Higashi, Nagoya, Japan.

== Schedule ==
All times are Japan Standard Time (UTC+09:00)

Date	Time	Event
Monday, 28 September 2026	11:00	1st round
Tuesday, 29 September 2026	11:00	1st round
Tuesday, 29 September 2026	16:00	2nd round
Wednesday, 30 September 2023	10:00	2nd round
Thursday, 1 October 2023	10:00	Quarterfinals
Friday, 2 October 2023	13:00	Semifinals
Saturday, 3 October 2023	11:00	Finals

== Results ==
=== Finals ===
Gold medal match
7	Fadona Kusumawati (INA); Fitriani Sabatini (INA)	3	4
2	Saki Tsukamoto (JPN); Kae Tokumoto (JPN)	6	6

Bronze medal match
	Danna Abad (PHI); Joshea Malazarte (PHI)	0	0
3	Novela Rezha (INA); Beatrice Gumulya (INA)	6	6

=== Top half ===
1st round
Aigerim Suleimen (KAZ); Tatyana Giorgadze (KAZ)	1	1
Mariam Al-Sarraj (KUW); Dalal Al-Qenaei (KUW)	6	6
Saba Najafi (IRI); Neda Taghipour (IRI)	7^{7}	6
Fatma Shahdoor (UAE); Maryam Al-Hashimi (UAE)	6^{4}	3
Samaher Kurdi (KSA); Lina Al-Abdullatif (KSA)	1	0
Danna Abad (PHI); Joshea Malazarte (PHI)	6	6

2nd round
1	Chifumi Sato (JPN); Kotomi Ozawa (JPN)	6	6
Alya Murad (QAT); Maha Faramarzi (QAT)	1	4
Mariam Al-Sarraj (KUW); Dalal Al-Qenaei (KUW)	1	0
7	Fadona Kusumawati (INA); Fitriani Sabatini (INA)	6	6
6	Melanie Lau (MAS); Elysia Wan (MAS)	6	4	1
Saba Najafi (IRI); Neda Taghipour (IRI)	3	6	6
Danna Abad (PHI); Joshea Malazarte (PHI)	6	6^{6}	6
4	Venise Chan (HKG); Lau Hiu Wai (HKG)	1	7^{8}	3

Quarterfinals
1	Chifumi Sato (JPN); Kotomi Ozawa (JPN)	0	1
7	Fadona Kusumawati (INA); Fitriani Sabatini (INA)	6	6
Saba Najafi (IRI); Neda Taghipour (IRI)	2	6	2
Danna Abad (PHI); Joshea Malazarte (PHI)	6	3	6

Semifinals
7	Fadona Kusumawati (INA); Fitriani Sabatini (INA)	6	6
Danna Abad (PHI); Joshea Malazarte (PHI)	0	0

=== Bottom half ===
1st round
Dana Al-Mudahka (QAT); Hanan Al-Abdulrahman (QAT)	0	2
Sahabeh Fard (IRI); Zahra Kahrizi (IRI)	6	6
Mariya Sinitsyna (KAZ); Albina Khabibulina (KAZ)	3	6	2
Joanna Tan (PHI); Marian Capadocia (PHI)	6	2	6
Natalie Narkprasert (THA); Dares Srirungreang (THA)	7	6
Noor Hasan (KUW); Zainab Sarkhoo (KUW)	5	3
Lilya Messaike (LBN); Maria Breidy (LBN)	3	6^{4}
Fatma Janahi (UAE); Aisha Al-Awadhi (UAE)	6	7^{7}

2nd round
3	Novela Rezha (INA); Beatrice Gumulya (INA)	6	6
Sahabeh Fard (IRI); Zahra Kahrizi (IRI)	3	1
Joanna Tan (PHI); Marian Capadocia (PHI)	7	4	4
5	Chan Hiu Laam (HKG); Law Yik Yan (HKG)	5	6	6
8	Areej Fareh (KSA); Al-Anoud Yamani (KSA)	6	6^{0}	7^{9}
Natalie Narkprasert (THA); Dares Srirungreang (THA)	1	7^{7}	6^{7}
Fatma Janahi (UAE); Aisha Al-Awadhi (UAE)	0	1
2	Saki Tsukamoto (JPN); Kae Tokumoto (JPN)	6	6

Quarterfinals
3	Novela Rezha (INA); Beatrice Gumulya (INA)	6	6
5	Chan Hiu Laam (HKG); Law Yik Yan (HKG)	1	2
8	Areej Fareh (KSA); Al-Anoud Yamani (KSA)	0	0
2	Saki Tsukamoto (JPN); Kae Tokumoto (JPN)	6	6

Semifinals
3	Novela Rezha (INA); Beatrice Gumulya (INA)	1	3
2	Saki Tsukamoto (JPN); Kae Tokumoto (JPN)	6	6
