= Srikandi Cup =

Women basketball tournament in Indonesia

- Founded: 2017
- First season: 2017
- Folded: 2020
- Country: Indonesia
- Number of teams: 8 (2017, 2017–18); 7 (2018–19); 6 (2020)
- Level on pyramid: 1
- Last champions: Merpati Bali (2018–19)
- Most championships: Surabaya Fever (2 titles)
- Website: perbasi.or.id/srikandi-cup

The Indonesia Srikandi Cup (Indonesian: Piala Srikandi) was a basketball competition between women's clubs in Indonesia.

== History ==
The Srikandi Cup was preceded by several Indonesian women's basketball leagues such as the Women's Premier Basketball Competition (Kobanita) and the Women's National Basketball League (WNBL).

When the Women Indonesia Basketball League was put on a hiatus in 2017, the Srikandi Cup was organized as an alternative women's competition. The tournament was organized independently by its member clubs. The Indonesia women's national team's preparation for the 2017 SEA Games in Malaysia was a motivation to organize a women's competition.

The inaugural 2017 season saw the participation of eight teams. The Srikandi Cup had several minor tournaments called "series" where a champion is awarded for each before the play-off tournament. Surabaya Fever was the first overall champion. Surabaya won their second consecutive title in the 2017-18 season.

The third season of 2018–19, saw the withdrawal of Surabaya Fever after its owner Christopher Tanuwidjaja was appointed as manager of the Indonesia women's national team. The tournament shifted to a league format where each participating team meet twice in the regular season across three series before the play-offs. Merpati Bali became the only other champions by besting Sahabat Semarang in the final.

Its last season, the 2019–20 Srikandi Cup was suspended on March 2020 due to the COVID-19 pandemic. The league was already financially struggling at that point. The season was officially cancelled in November 2020 with expired contracts of some players and coaching staff of the participating teams also cited as a reason.

== Clubs ==
Club	City	Joined	Last season
Flying Wheel Makassar	Makassar	2017	2020
GMC Cirebon	Cirebon	2017–18	2020
Merah Putih Samator Jakarta	Jakarta	2017	2017–18
Merpati Bali	Bali	2017	2020
Sahabat Semarang	Semarang	2017	2020
Satria Siliwangi	Bandung	2017	
Surabaya Fever	Surabaya	2017	2017–18
Tanago Friesian Jakarta	Jakarta	2017	2020
Tenaga Baru Pontianak	Pontianak	2017	2018–19
Scorpio Jakarta	Jakarta	2018–19	2020

== List of champions ==
=== Series champions ===
Year	First series		Second series		Third series		Ref.
Year	Host	Champions	Host	Champions	Host	Champions	Ref.
2017	Bali	Surabaya Fever	Pontianak	Surabaya Fever	Semarang	Surabaya Fever	
2017–18	Makassar	Surabaya Fever	Surabaya	Surabaya Fever	Jakarta	Surabaya Fever	
2018–19	Not awarded						
2020	Not awarded						

=== Overall champions ===
Year	Champions	Finals result	Runners-up	Ref.
2017	Surabaya Fever	64–54	Sahabat Semarang	
2017–18	Surabaya Fever	61–47	Merpati Bali	
2018–19	Merpati Bali	66–45	Sahabat Semarang	
2020	Cancelled			
