= Pajar Ariyana =

Indonesian surfer (born 2004)

Personal information
- Full name: I Made Pajar Ariyana
- Born: 16 September 2004 (age 22) Serangan, Bali, Indonesia

Sport
- Country: Indonesia
- Sport: Surfing
- Event: Shortboard
Medal record
Men's surfing
Representing Indonesia
Asian Games
Silver medal – second place	2026 Aichi–Nagoya	Shortboard
Asian Surfing Championships
Gold medal – first place	2024 Thulusdhoo	Shortboard
Gold medal – first place	2025 Tamil Nadu	Team
Silver medal – second place	2025 Tamil Nadu	Shortboard

I Made Pajar Ariyana (born 16 September 2004) is an Indonesian surfer. He won the 2024 Asian Surfing Championships in Thulusdhoo, Maldives. He competed at the 2026 Asian Games, and won the silver medal in the men's shortboard.

== Early life ==
Ariyana began learning to surf at Serangan Beach, Bali, at the age of 6.

== Career wins ==
Ariyana has won several competitions, including the following:

WSL Qualifying Series Win
Year	Event	Venue	Country
2025	Manokwari Pro	Manokwari, Papua	Indonesia
2024	Manokwari Pro	Manokwari, Papua	Indonesia
Junior Wins
Year	Event	Venue	Country
2024	Manokwari Pro Junior	Manokwari, Papua	Indonesia
2024	Nias Pro Junior	Nias, North Sumatra	Indonesia
