= Fitriani Sabatini =

Indonesian padel player (born 2001)

Personal information
- Full name: Fitriani Sabatini
- Born: 13 February 2001 (age 25) Indonesia

Sport
- Country: Indonesia
- Sport: Padel and Tennis
- Rank: 271 (3 August 2026)

Achievements and titles
- Highest world ranking: 266 (2026)
Medal record
Women's padel
Representing Indonesia
Asian Games
| Silver medal – second place | 2026 Aichi-Nagoya | Women's pairs |
- Updated on 3 August 2026

Fitriani Sabatini (born 13 February 2001) is an Indonesian tennis and padel player. In tennis, she represented Indonesia at the 2021 SEA Games in Hanoi, where she won a bronze medal in the women's team event. She also won five tennis medals representing Jakarta at the 2021 and 2024 editions of the National Sports Week of Indonesia, comprising two silver medals in the women's team event and three bronze medals in singles and doubles.

In padel, Sabatini represented Indonesia at the 2025 FIP Asia Padel Cup, where the Indonesian women's team won the bronze medal. Partnering her twin sister, Fitriana Sabrina, she reached the final of the 2026 FIP Bronze Jakarta. She reached a career-high FIP ranking of world No. 266 in 2026.
