= Kae Tokumoto =

Japanese padel player

Personal information
- Native name: 徳本 佳恵
- Nationality: Japanese
- Born: 20 April 1991 (age 35)
- Education: University of the Sacred Heart

Sport
- Sport: Padel
Medal record
Padel
Representing Japan
Asian Games
Gold medal – first place	2026 Aichi-Nagoya	Women's pairs

Kae Tokumoto (Japanese: 徳本佳恵; born 20 April 1991) is a Japanese professional padel player. Partnering with Saki Tsukamoto, she won the women's pairs gold medal at the 2026 Asian Games in Aichi-Nagoya, Japan. The victory gave Japan its first gold medal in women's padel at the Asian Games, where the sport made its debut as a medal event.

== Career ==
Tokumoto studied at the University of the Sacred Heart in Tokyo and previously worked in banking while pursuing padel. She later left her banking career to compete professionally, representing Japan in domestic and international tournaments.

In 2023, Tokumoto won the women's title at the seventh Dunlop All-Japan Padel Championships. She represented Japan at the 2024 FIP World Padel Championships in Qatar, where the Japanese team finished 11th.

In May 2026, Tokumoto and Saki Tsukamoto won the women's competition at the Road to Nagoya national selection tournament, earning selection for Japan's team at the 2026 Asian Games.

At the Asian Games, held in Aichi and Nagoya, Tokumoto and Tsukamoto advanced to the women's pairs final. On 3 October 2026, they defeated Indonesia's Fitriani Sabatini and Fadona Kusumawati in straight sets, 6–3, 6–4, to win the gold medal. The result marked Japan's first women's padel gold medal at the Asian Games.
