= Saki Tsukamoto =

Japanese padel player

Personal information
- Native name: 塚本 早紀
- Nationality: Japanese
- Born: 4 June 1991 (age 35)
- Education: Waseda University
- Occupation: Padel player
- Employer: Tokyo Gas

Sport
- Sport: Padel
Medal record
Padel
Representing Japan
Asian Games
Gold medal – first place	2026 Aichi-Nagoya	Women's pairs

Saki Tsukamoto (Japanese: 塚本早紀; born 4 June 1991) is a Japanese padel player. Partnering with Kae Tokumoto, she won the women's pairs gold medal at the 2026 Asian Games in Aichi-Nagoya, Japan.

== Career ==
Tsukamoto studied at Waseda University and is associated with Tokyo Gas and Tactical. She competes on the international padel circuit and represents Japan in international competitions.

In July 2025, Tsukamoto reached the final of the FIP Bronze Tokyo tournament in the women's doubles competition, partnering with Kotomi Ozawa.

In 2026, Tsukamoto partnered with Kae Tokumoto in the women's pairs competition at the Asian Games. The Japanese pair advanced to the final, where they defeated Indonesia's Fitriani Sabatini and Fadona Kusumawati 6–3, 6–4 on 3 October to win the gold medal. It was Japan's first women's padel gold medal at the Asian Games, where padel was contested as a medal sport for the first time.
