= Surabaya Fever =

- Nickname: Fever
- Founded: 2012
- Location: Surabaya
- Ownership: Christopher Tanuwidjaja

The Surabaya Fever is a women's basketball club based in Surabaya, Indonesia.

== History ==
Surabaya Fever was established in 2012 as one of the inaugural teams of the Women National Basketball League (WNBL) Indonesia and won the first ever WNBL title in that year. It was runners-up in the following season in 2013.It also later won the 2014–15 WNBL Indonesia season.

Surabaya Fever also became champions of the subsequent leagues. The Women's Indonesian Basketball League in 2016, and the Srikandi Cup in 2017 and 2017–18.

Surabaya Fever withdrew from the 2017–18 Srikanda Cup after its owner Christopher Tanuwidjaja was appointed as manager of the Indonesia women's national team.

The team remained active since 2019 amidst the effective folding of the Srikandi Cup in 2020 due to the COVID-19 pandemic. They were then invited to take part at the inaugural 2024 Women's Basketball League Asia. They finished fourth, last among participating teams.
