= Handball at the 2013 Asian Youth Games =

- Venue: JSC Gymnasium; NUT Gymnasium
- Dates: 13–23 August 2013

Handball at the 2013 Asian Youth Games was held from 13 August to 23 August at the Nanjing Jiangning Sports Centre Gymnasium and the Nanjing University of Technology Gymnasium in Nanjing.

== Medalists ==
Event	Gold	Silver	Bronze
Boys	Qatar; Omar Abdelfattah; Abdulaziz Helali; Bilal Lepenica; Ebrahim Ebaid; Adson Bajrić; Ahmed Abdelrhem; Irhad Alihodžić; Amine Guehis; Salem Ebrahim; Amor Dhiab; Abdulrahman Abu Al-Shaar; Nour Achraf; Faruk Colo; Moustafa Heiba	South Korea; Park Jae-yong; Lee Seop; Kang Seok-ju; Park Kwang-soon; Jo Jun-sang; Choi Beom-mun; Kim Ji-hoon; Kim Yeon-bin; Lim Gyeong-hwan; Yeon Min-mo; Choi Hyeon-u; Song Yong-sig; Seo Jae-deok; Jeong Kwang-il	Bahrain; Khali Mubarak; Khaled Al-Balooshi; Husain Maki; Hasan Al-Adhab; Mohamed Farsan; Fadhel Al-Haddad; Qasim Al-Shuwaikh; Mahmood Al-Salatena; Hasan Madan; Qasim Hasan; Ali Shaalan; Zaher Omar; Nadeem Al-Qattan; Abdulrahman Al-Douky
Girls	South Korea; Cho Hyeon-mi; Kang Kyung-min; Park Min-jeong; Yu So-jeong; Park Jun-hee; Song Ji-young; Lee Min-ji; Kang Da-hye; Lee Da-hyeon; Lee Hye-jung; Kim Seong-eun; Park Jo-eun; Kang Eun-hye; Kim So-ra	Kazakhstan; Galina Babich; Liliya Kirillova; Viktoriya Titok; Dana Abilda; Ulyana Chepkassova; Yekaterina Yurchenko; Veronika Khardina; Alena Shabanova; Kristina Shutko; Alyona Khryakova; Anna Kazachenko; Madina Sharifova; Zarina Baigabylova	China; Yang Yurou; Yang Yin; Han Yu; Zhou Xueting; Zhang Chunjin; Zhang Tingting; Li Xiang; Liu Xuelu; Xu Hanshu; Cao Wenjie; Yang Lu; Ma Lin; Suo Shanshan; Xiao Ningtong

== Medal table ==
Rank	Nation	Gold	Silver	Bronze	Total
1	South Korea (KOR)	1	1	0	2
2	Qatar (QAT)	1	0	0	1
3	Kazakhstan (KAZ)	0	1	0	1
4	Bahrain (BRN)	0	0	1	1
4	China (CHN)	0	0	1	1
Totals (5 entries)		2	2	2	6

== Results ==
=== Boys ===
==== Preliminary round ====
===== Group A =====
Pos	Team	Pld	W	D	L	GF	GA	GD	Pts
1	Qatar	3	3	0	0	128	38	+90	6
2	Iran	3	2	0	1	119	41	+78	4
3	Pakistan	3	1	0	2	40	132	−92	2
4	Vietnam	3	0	0	3	32	108	−76	0

Source: AHF

13 August; 12:00	Iran	55–12	Pakistan	JSC Gymnasium, Nanjing; Referees: Li, Liu (CHN)
13 August; 12:00	Yousefinejad 11	(25–3)	Riaz 7	JSC Gymnasium, Nanjing; Referees: Li, Liu (CHN)
13 August; 12:00	3× (yellow card) 3× (suspension)		2× (yellow card) 1× (suspension)	JSC Gymnasium, Nanjing; Referees: Li, Liu (CHN)

13 August; 15:30	Qatar	44–10	Vietnam	JSC Gymnasium, Nanjing; Referees: Kadhim, Shakir (IRQ)
13 August; 15:30	Braham 8	(22–6)	Nguyễn H., Hoàng G., Hoàng T. 2	JSC Gymnasium, Nanjing; Referees: Kadhim, Shakir (IRQ)
13 August; 15:30	2× (yellow card)		2× (yellow card) 5× (suspension)	JSC Gymnasium, Nanjing; Referees: Kadhim, Shakir (IRQ)

14 August; 12:00	Pakistan	7–61	Qatar	NUT Gymnasium, Nanjing; Referees: El-Haj, Al-Zagameem (JOR)
14 August; 12:00	Riaz 4	(4–26)	Dhiab 17	NUT Gymnasium, Nanjing; Referees: El-Haj, Al-Zagameem (JOR)
14 August; 12:00	3× (yellow card) 1× (suspension) 1× (red card)		3× (yellow card) 3× (suspension)	NUT Gymnasium, Nanjing; Referees: El-Haj, Al-Zagameem (JOR)

14 August; 15:30	Vietnam	6–43	Iran	NUT Gymnasium, Nanjing; Referees: Al-Dossary, Al-Marri (KSA)
14 August; 15:30	Nguyễn P. 2	(1–20)	A. Sahraei, Yousefinejad 6	NUT Gymnasium, Nanjing; Referees: Al-Dossary, Al-Marri (KSA)
14 August; 15:30	3× (yellow card) 2× (suspension)		2× (yellow card) 2× (suspension)	NUT Gymnasium, Nanjing; Referees: Al-Dossary, Al-Marri (KSA)

15 August; 12:00	Pakistan	21–16	Vietnam	NUT Gymnasium, Nanjing; Referees: Li, Liu (CHN)
15 August; 12:00	Riaz 7	(10–7)	Nguyễn T.H. 6	NUT Gymnasium, Nanjing; Referees: Li, Liu (CHN)
15 August; 12:00	3× (yellow card) 5× (suspension)		3× (yellow card) 2× (suspension)	NUT Gymnasium, Nanjing; Referees: Li, Liu (CHN)

15 August; 15:30	Iran	21–23	Qatar	NUT Gymnasium, Nanjing; Referees: Al-Muhafdeh, Mohamed (BHR)
15 August; 15:30	Yousefinejad 7	(9–7)	Helali 9	NUT Gymnasium, Nanjing; Referees: Al-Muhafdeh, Mohamed (BHR)
15 August; 15:30	2× (yellow card) 4× (suspension)		3× (yellow card) 5× (suspension)	NUT Gymnasium, Nanjing; Referees: Al-Muhafdeh, Mohamed (BHR)

===== Group B =====
Pos	Team	Pld	W	D	L	GF	GA	GD	Pts
1	Saudi Arabia	3	3	0	0	141	60	+81	6
2	Iraq	3	2	0	1	104	61	+43	4
3	China	3	1	0	2	108	76	+32	2
4	Mongolia	3	0	0	3	26	182	−156	0

Source: AHF

13 August; 12:00	Saudi Arabia	75–7	Mongolia	NUT Gymnasium, Nanjing; Referees: El-Haj (JOR), Lim (KOR)
13 August; 12:00	Al-Hajji 14	(37–3)	Narantsogt 3	NUT Gymnasium, Nanjing; Referees: El-Haj (JOR), Lim (KOR)
13 August; 12:00	2× (yellow card) 1× (suspension)		2× (yellow card) 6× (suspension)	NUT Gymnasium, Nanjing; Referees: El-Haj (JOR), Lim (KOR)

13 August; 15:30	Iraq	27–25	China	NUT Gymnasium, Nanjing; Referees: Al-Dossary, Al-Marri (KSA)
13 August; 15:30	Ghassab 8	(13–13)	Wang J. 10	NUT Gymnasium, Nanjing; Referees: Al-Dossary, Al-Marri (KSA)
13 August; 15:30	2× (yellow card) 1× (suspension)		2× (yellow card) 3× (suspension)	NUT Gymnasium, Nanjing; Referees: Al-Dossary, Al-Marri (KSA)

14 August; 12:00	China	26–38	Saudi Arabia	JSC Gymnasium, Nanjing; Referees: Al-Suwaidi, Bamatraf (QAT)
14 August; 12:00	Chen, Wang J., Xu 6	(12–13)	Al-Mohsin 12	JSC Gymnasium, Nanjing; Referees: Al-Suwaidi, Bamatraf (QAT)
14 August; 12:00	2× (yellow card) 4× (suspension)		3× (yellow card) 5× (suspension)	JSC Gymnasium, Nanjing; Referees: Al-Suwaidi, Bamatraf (QAT)

14 August; 15:30	Mongolia	8–50	Iraq	JSC Gymnasium, Nanjing; Referees: Sadeghi, Shafaei (IRI)
14 August; 15:30	Adyaa 4	(5–22)	Abdul-Ameer 9	JSC Gymnasium, Nanjing; Referees: Sadeghi, Shafaei (IRI)
14 August; 15:30	2× (yellow card) 6× (suspension) 1× (red card)		3× (yellow card) 5× (suspension)	JSC Gymnasium, Nanjing; Referees: Sadeghi, Shafaei (IRI)

15 August; 12:00	China	57–11	Mongolia	JSC Gymnasium, Nanjing; Referees: Al-Zagameem, El-Haj (JOR)
15 August; 12:00	Li X. 12	(26–4)	Narantsogt, Adyaa, Amarbayasgalan 3	JSC Gymnasium, Nanjing; Referees: Al-Zagameem, El-Haj (JOR)
15 August; 12:00	3× (yellow card) 2× (suspension)		2× (yellow card) 2× (suspension)	JSC Gymnasium, Nanjing; Referees: Al-Zagameem, El-Haj (JOR)

15 August; 15:30	Iraq	27–28	Saudi Arabia	JSC Gymnasium, Nanjing; Referees: Al-Marzouqi, Al-Nuaimi (UAE)
15 August; 15:30	Ghassab 10	(14–12)	M. Al-Ibrahim, Al-Mohsin 7	JSC Gymnasium, Nanjing; Referees: Al-Marzouqi, Al-Nuaimi (UAE)
15 August; 15:30	3× (yellow card) 7× (suspension)		4× (yellow card) 6× (suspension)	JSC Gymnasium, Nanjing; Referees: Al-Marzouqi, Al-Nuaimi (UAE)

===== Group C =====
Pos	Team	Pld	W	D	L	GF	GA	GD	Pts
1	Bahrain	3	3	0	0	93	70	+23	6
2	Kuwait	3	2	0	1	87	74	+13	4
3	Chinese Taipei	3	1	0	2	80	88	−8	2
4	Thailand	3	0	0	3	68	96	−28	0

Source: AHF

13 August; 13:45	Kuwait	37–22	Thailand	JSC Gymnasium, Nanjing; Referees: Hizaki, Ikebuchi (JPN)
13 August; 13:45	Radhaei, Al-Harbi 9	(17–12)	Mekpromnok 6	JSC Gymnasium, Nanjing; Referees: Hizaki, Ikebuchi (JPN)
13 August; 13:45	3× (yellow card) 3× (suspension)		3× (yellow card) 4× (suspension) 1× (red card)	JSC Gymnasium, Nanjing; Referees: Hizaki, Ikebuchi (JPN)

13 August; 17:15	Bahrain	34–28	Chinese Taipei	JSC Gymnasium, Nanjing; Referees: Al-Suwaidi, Bamatraf (QAT)
13 August; 17:15	Madan 8	(17–12)	Wang T. 8	JSC Gymnasium, Nanjing; Referees: Al-Suwaidi, Bamatraf (QAT)
13 August; 17:15	3× (yellow card) 6× (suspension)		2× (yellow card) 3× (suspension)	JSC Gymnasium, Nanjing; Referees: Al-Suwaidi, Bamatraf (QAT)

14 August; 13:45	Thailand	23–32	Bahrain	NUT Gymnasium, Nanjing; Referees: Kadhim, Shakir (IRQ)
14 August; 13:45	Cherddork, Mekpromnok 6	(10–16)	Al-Haddad 9	NUT Gymnasium, Nanjing; Referees: Kadhim, Shakir (IRQ)
14 August; 13:45	3× (yellow card) 7× (suspension)		3× (yellow card) 4× (suspension)	NUT Gymnasium, Nanjing; Referees: Kadhim, Shakir (IRQ)

14 August; 17:15	Chinese Taipei	25–31	Kuwait	NUT Gymnasium, Nanjing; Referees: Al-Marzouqi, Al-Nuaimi (UAE)
14 August; 17:15	Pan 6	(8–12)	Sadoon 9	NUT Gymnasium, Nanjing; Referees: Al-Marzouqi, Al-Nuaimi (UAE)
14 August; 17:15	3× (yellow card) 1× (suspension) 1× (red card)		3× (yellow card) 5× (suspension)	NUT Gymnasium, Nanjing; Referees: Al-Marzouqi, Al-Nuaimi (UAE)

15 August; 13:45	Thailand	23–27	Chinese Taipei	JSC Gymnasium, Nanjing; Referees: Al-Dossary, Al-Marri (KSA)
15 August; 13:45	Moohuana 10	(10–13)	Hsiao, Pan 6	JSC Gymnasium, Nanjing; Referees: Al-Dossary, Al-Marri (KSA)
15 August; 13:45	3× (yellow card) 5× (suspension)		3× (yellow card) 5× (suspension)	JSC Gymnasium, Nanjing; Referees: Al-Dossary, Al-Marri (KSA)

15 August; 17:15	Kuwait	19–27	Bahrain	JSC Gymnasium, Nanjing; Referees: Al-Suwaidi, Bamatraf (QAT)
15 August; 17:15	Al-Mulla 5	(8–14)	Mubarak 7	JSC Gymnasium, Nanjing; Referees: Al-Suwaidi, Bamatraf (QAT)
15 August; 17:15	3× (yellow card) 6× (suspension) 1× (red card)		3× (yellow card) 3× (suspension)	JSC Gymnasium, Nanjing; Referees: Al-Suwaidi, Bamatraf (QAT)

===== Group D =====
Pos	Team	Pld	W	D	L	GF	GA	GD	Pts
1	South Korea	3	3	0	0	128	45	+83	6
2	Syria	3	2	0	1	89	88	+1	4
3	Kazakhstan	3	0	1	2	71	107	−36	1
4	Hong Kong	3	0	1	2	63	111	−48	1

Source: AHF

13 August; 13:45	Syria	32–29	Kazakhstan	NUT Gymnasium, Nanjing; Referees: Al-Marzouqi, Al-Nuaimi (UAE)
13 August; 13:45	Al-Akhras, Hasan 8	(14–15)	Yessembekov 11	NUT Gymnasium, Nanjing; Referees: Al-Marzouqi, Al-Nuaimi (UAE)
13 August; 13:45	3× (yellow card) 4× (suspension)		3× (yellow card) 2× (suspension)	NUT Gymnasium, Nanjing; Referees: Al-Marzouqi, Al-Nuaimi (UAE)

13 August; 17:15	South Korea	46–11	Hong Kong	NUT Gymnasium, Nanjing; Referees: Al-Muhafdeh, Mohamed (BHR)
13 August; 17:15	Lim 7	(17–9)	Sandhu 6	NUT Gymnasium, Nanjing; Referees: Al-Muhafdeh, Mohamed (BHR)
13 August; 17:15	3× (yellow card)		2× (yellow card) 2× (suspension)	NUT Gymnasium, Nanjing; Referees: Al-Muhafdeh, Mohamed (BHR)

14 August; 13:45	Kazakhstan	16–49	South Korea	JSC Gymnasium, Nanjing; Referees: Peng (CHN), Minoru (JPN)
14 August; 13:45	Yakubovich 6	(5–25)	Kim Y., Seo 7	JSC Gymnasium, Nanjing; Referees: Peng (CHN), Minoru (JPN)
14 August; 13:45	2× (yellow card) 2× (suspension)		3× (yellow card) 2× (suspension)	JSC Gymnasium, Nanjing; Referees: Peng (CHN), Minoru (JPN)

14 August; 17:15	Hong Kong	26–39	Syria	JSC Gymnasium, Nanjing; Referees: Kim, Sin (PRK)
14 August; 17:15	Chan 7	(11–20)	Al-Kharof 13	JSC Gymnasium, Nanjing; Referees: Kim, Sin (PRK)
14 August; 17:15	2× (yellow card) 7× (suspension)		3× (yellow card)	JSC Gymnasium, Nanjing; Referees: Kim, Sin (PRK)

15 August; 13:45	Kazakhstan	26–26	Hong Kong	NUT Gymnasium, Nanjing; Referees: Sadeghi, Shafaei (IRI)
15 August; 13:45	Yessembekov 7	(11–14)	Chan 8	NUT Gymnasium, Nanjing; Referees: Sadeghi, Shafaei (IRI)
15 August; 13:45	3× (yellow card) 4× (suspension)		3× (yellow card) 7× (suspension)	NUT Gymnasium, Nanjing; Referees: Sadeghi, Shafaei (IRI)

15 August; 17:15	Syria	18–33	South Korea	NUT Gymnasium, Nanjing; Referees: Ikebuchi, Hizaki (JPN)
15 August; 17:15	Hasan, Al-Kharof, Kadoor 4	(6–19)	Kim Y. 7	NUT Gymnasium, Nanjing; Referees: Ikebuchi, Hizaki (JPN)
15 August; 17:15	1× (yellow card) 4× (suspension)		2× (yellow card) 5× (suspension)	NUT Gymnasium, Nanjing; Referees: Ikebuchi, Hizaki (JPN)

==== Placement 13–16 ====
Semifinals
17 August
Vietnam	14
Thailand	31
17 August
Mongolia	20
Hong Kong	38

Placement 13–14
19 August
Thailand	29
Hong Kong	25
Placement 15–16
19 August
Vietnam	29
Mongolia	14

===== Semifinals =====
17 August; 10:00	Vietnam	14–31	Thailand	NUT Gymnasium, Nanjing; Referees: Kadhim, Shakir (IRQ)
17 August; 10:00	Nguyễn P. 7	(6–14)	Cherddork 6	NUT Gymnasium, Nanjing; Referees: Kadhim, Shakir (IRQ)
17 August; 10:00	2× (yellow card) 5× (suspension)		2× (yellow card) 3× (suspension)	NUT Gymnasium, Nanjing; Referees: Kadhim, Shakir (IRQ)

17 August; 11:45	Mongolia	20–38	Hong Kong	NUT Gymnasium, Nanjing; Referees: Ye, Zhang (CHN)
17 August; 11:45	Narantsogt 9	(9–22)	Sandhu 6	NUT Gymnasium, Nanjing; Referees: Ye, Zhang (CHN)
17 August; 11:45	3× (yellow card) 4× (suspension)		3× (yellow card) 2× (suspension)	NUT Gymnasium, Nanjing; Referees: Ye, Zhang (CHN)

===== Placement 15–16 =====
19 August; 10:00	Vietnam	29–14	Mongolia	NUT Gymnasium, Nanjing; Referees: Sadeghi, Shafaei (IRI)
19 August; 10:00	Nguyễn T.H. 8	(12–7)	Adyaa 4	NUT Gymnasium, Nanjing; Referees: Sadeghi, Shafaei (IRI)
19 August; 10:00	3× (yellow card) 3× (suspension)		3× (yellow card) 5× (suspension)	NUT Gymnasium, Nanjing; Referees: Sadeghi, Shafaei (IRI)

===== Placement 13–14 =====
18 August; 12:00	Thailand	29–25	Hong Kong	NUT Gymnasium, Nanjing; Referees: Sin, Kim (PRK)
18 August; 12:00	Cherddork 9	(15–13)	Sandhu 10	NUT Gymnasium, Nanjing; Referees: Sin, Kim (PRK)
18 August; 12:00	3× (yellow card) 8× (suspension)		3× (yellow card) 3× (suspension)	NUT Gymnasium, Nanjing; Referees: Sin, Kim (PRK)

==== Placement 9–12 ====
Semifinals
17 August
Pakistan	18
Chinese Taipei	40
17 August
China	36
Kazakhstan	20

Placement 9–10
19 August
Chinese Taipei	38
China	30
Placement 11–12
19 August
Pakistan	25
Kazakhstan	32

===== Semifinals =====
17 August; 10:00	Pakistan	18–40	Chinese Taipei	JSC Gymnasium, Nanjing; Referees: Shafaei, Sadeghi (IRI)
17 August; 10:00	Riaz 5	(10–19)	Wang T. 10	JSC Gymnasium, Nanjing; Referees: Shafaei, Sadeghi (IRI)
17 August; 10:00	3× (yellow card) 1× (suspension)		3× (yellow card) 1× (suspension)	JSC Gymnasium, Nanjing; Referees: Shafaei, Sadeghi (IRI)

17 August; 11:45	China	36–20	Kazakhstan	JSC Gymnasium, Nanjing; Referees: Al-Zagameem, El-Haj (JOR)
17 August; 11:45	Wang J. 7	(19–13)	Yeltayev 6	JSC Gymnasium, Nanjing; Referees: Al-Zagameem, El-Haj (JOR)
17 August; 11:45	3× (yellow card) 5× (suspension)		2× (yellow card) 5× (suspension)	JSC Gymnasium, Nanjing; Referees: Al-Zagameem, El-Haj (JOR)

===== Placement 11–12 =====
19 August; 10:00	Pakistan	25–32	Kazakhstan	JSC Gymnasium, Nanjing; Referees: Al-Dossary, Al-Marri (KSA)
19 August; 10:00	Riaz 11	(12–18)	Yessembekov 13	JSC Gymnasium, Nanjing; Referees: Al-Dossary, Al-Marri (KSA)
19 August; 10:00	3× (yellow card) 4× (suspension)		3× (yellow card) 3× (suspension) 1× (red card)	JSC Gymnasium, Nanjing; Referees: Al-Dossary, Al-Marri (KSA)

===== Placement 9–10 =====
19 August; 12:00	Chinese Taipei	38–30	China	JSC Gymnasium, Nanjing; Referees: Shakir, Kadhim (IRQ)
19 August; 12:00	Wang T. 12	(15–15)	Wang J. 8	JSC Gymnasium, Nanjing; Referees: Shakir, Kadhim (IRQ)
19 August; 12:00	3× (yellow card) 3× (suspension)		2× (yellow card) 3× (suspension)	JSC Gymnasium, Nanjing; Referees: Shakir, Kadhim (IRQ)

==== Group stage ====
===== Group 1 =====
Pos	Team	Pld	W	D	L	GF	GA	GD	Pts
1	Qatar	3	3	0	0	80	52	+28	6
2	Bahrain	3	2	0	1	80	76	+4	4
3	Iraq	3	1	0	2	70	79	−9	2
4	Syria	3	0	0	3	53	76	−23	0

Source: AHF

17 August; 13:30	Qatar	36–23	Iraq	JSC Gymnasium, Nanjing; Referees: Li, Liu (CHN)
17 August; 13:30	Dhiab 11	(17–13)	Ghassab 10	JSC Gymnasium, Nanjing; Referees: Li, Liu (CHN)
17 August; 13:30	2× (yellow card) 4× (suspension)		3× (yellow card) 1× (suspension)	JSC Gymnasium, Nanjing; Referees: Li, Liu (CHN)

17 August; 17:00	Bahrain	35–26	Syria	JSC Gymnasium, Nanjing; Referees: Al-Dossary, Al-Marri (KSA)
17 August; 17:00	Al-Haddad 9	(16–10)	Hasan 10	JSC Gymnasium, Nanjing; Referees: Al-Dossary, Al-Marri (KSA)
17 August; 17:00	2× (yellow card) 6× (suspension)		3× (yellow card) 6× (suspension)	JSC Gymnasium, Nanjing; Referees: Al-Dossary, Al-Marri (KSA)

18 August; 13:30	Syria	10–19	Qatar	JSC Gymnasium, Nanjing; Referees: Li, Liu (CHN)
18 August; 13:30	Hasan 4	(5–11)	Achraf, Colo 4	JSC Gymnasium, Nanjing; Referees: Li, Liu (CHN)
18 August; 13:30	3× (yellow card) 1× (suspension)		3× (yellow card) 8× (suspension)	JSC Gymnasium, Nanjing; Referees: Li, Liu (CHN)

18 August; 17:00	Iraq	25–26	Bahrain	JSC Gymnasium, Nanjing; Referees: Al-Nuaimi, Al-Marzouqi (UAE)
18 August; 17:00	Ghassab 10	(13–14)	Al-Haddad 6	JSC Gymnasium, Nanjing; Referees: Al-Nuaimi, Al-Marzouqi (UAE)
18 August; 17:00	3× (yellow card) 4× (suspension)		4× (yellow card) 1× (suspension)	JSC Gymnasium, Nanjing; Referees: Al-Nuaimi, Al-Marzouqi (UAE)

19 August; 15:45	Qatar	25–19	Bahrain	JSC Gymnasium, Nanjing; Referees: Hizaki, Ikebuchi (JPN)
19 August; 15:45	Dhiab 7	(10–11)	Al-Adhab, Madan 5	JSC Gymnasium, Nanjing; Referees: Hizaki, Ikebuchi (JPN)
19 August; 15:45	3× (yellow card) 2× (suspension)		2× (yellow card) 5× (suspension)	JSC Gymnasium, Nanjing; Referees: Hizaki, Ikebuchi (JPN)

19 August; 19:15	Syria	17–22	Iraq	JSC Gymnasium, Nanjing; Referees: Al-Zagameem, El-Haj (JOR)
19 August; 19:15	Hasan 10	(10–11)	Ghassab 10	JSC Gymnasium, Nanjing; Referees: Al-Zagameem, El-Haj (JOR)
19 August; 19:15	3× (yellow card) 3× (suspension)		3× (yellow card) 6× (suspension)	JSC Gymnasium, Nanjing; Referees: Al-Zagameem, El-Haj (JOR)

===== Group 2 =====
Pos	Team	Pld	W	D	L	GF	GA	GD	Pts
1	South Korea	3	3	0	0	86	71	+15	6
2	Saudi Arabia	3	2	0	1	78	76	+2	4
3	Kuwait	3	1	0	2	79	83	−4	2
4	Iran	3	0	0	3	70	83	−13	0

Source: AHF

17 August; 15:15	Saudi Arabia	29–27	Kuwait	JSC Gymnasium, Nanjing; Referees: Al-Marzouqi, Al-Nuaimi (UAE)
17 August; 15:15	Al-Mohsin 13	(13–13)	Radhaei 7	JSC Gymnasium, Nanjing; Referees: Al-Marzouqi, Al-Nuaimi (UAE)
17 August; 15:15	4× (yellow card) 6× (suspension)		3× (yellow card) 5× (suspension)	JSC Gymnasium, Nanjing; Referees: Al-Marzouqi, Al-Nuaimi (UAE)

17 August; 18:45	South Korea	29–24	Iran	JSC Gymnasium, Nanjing; Referees: Ikebuchi, Hizaki (JPN)
17 August; 18:45	Kim Y. 8	(13–10)	Yousefinejad 8	JSC Gymnasium, Nanjing; Referees: Ikebuchi, Hizaki (JPN)
17 August; 18:45	4× (yellow card) 6× (suspension)		3× (yellow card) 3× (suspension) 1× (red card)	JSC Gymnasium, Nanjing; Referees: Ikebuchi, Hizaki (JPN)

18 August; 15:15	Iran	22–27	Saudi Arabia	JSC Gymnasium, Nanjing; Referees: Ikebuchi, Hizaki (JPN)
18 August; 15:15	Yousefinejad 6	(12–11)	Al-Mohsin 9	JSC Gymnasium, Nanjing; Referees: Ikebuchi, Hizaki (JPN)
18 August; 15:15	2× (yellow card) 3× (suspension)		4× (yellow card) 7× (suspension)	JSC Gymnasium, Nanjing; Referees: Ikebuchi, Hizaki (JPN)

18 August; 18:45	Kuwait	25–30	South Korea	JSC Gymnasium, Nanjing; Referees: Mohamed, Al-Muhafdeh (BHR)
18 August; 18:45	Sadoon 9	(14–15)	Park K. 6	JSC Gymnasium, Nanjing; Referees: Mohamed, Al-Muhafdeh (BHR)
18 August; 18:45	3× (yellow card) 3× (suspension)		3× (yellow card) 3× (suspension)	JSC Gymnasium, Nanjing; Referees: Mohamed, Al-Muhafdeh (BHR)

19 August; 14:00	Saudi Arabia	22–27	South Korea	JSC Gymnasium, Nanjing; Referees: Mohamed, Al-Muhafdeh (BHR)
19 August; 14:00	Al-Mohsin 7	(11–16)	Kim Y. 6	JSC Gymnasium, Nanjing; Referees: Mohamed, Al-Muhafdeh (BHR)
19 August; 14:00	3× (yellow card) 3× (suspension)		3× (yellow card) 6× (suspension)	JSC Gymnasium, Nanjing; Referees: Mohamed, Al-Muhafdeh (BHR)

19 August; 17:30	Kuwait	27–24	Iran	JSC Gymnasium, Nanjing; Referees: Al-Suwaidi, Bamatraf (QAT)
19 August; 17:30	Sadoon 12	(10–9)	Yousefinejad 7	JSC Gymnasium, Nanjing; Referees: Al-Suwaidi, Bamatraf (QAT)
19 August; 17:30	3× (yellow card) 4× (suspension)		4× (yellow card) 2× (suspension)	JSC Gymnasium, Nanjing; Referees: Al-Suwaidi, Bamatraf (QAT)

==== Placement 5–8 ====
===== Placement 7–8 =====
21 August; 12:00	Syria	26–42	Iran	JSC Gymnasium, Nanjing; Referees: Liu, Li (CHN)
21 August; 12:00	Al-Kharof 13	(10–21)	Farhadi 12	JSC Gymnasium, Nanjing; Referees: Liu, Li (CHN)
21 August; 12:00	4× (yellow card) 1× (suspension) 1× (red card)		4× (yellow card) 3× (suspension)	JSC Gymnasium, Nanjing; Referees: Liu, Li (CHN)

===== Placement 5–6 =====
21 August; 14:00	Iraq	30–35	Kuwait	JSC Gymnasium, Nanjing; Referees: Al-Dossary, Al-Marri (KSA)
21 August; 14:00	Ghassab 15	(11–19)	Sadoon 7	JSC Gymnasium, Nanjing; Referees: Al-Dossary, Al-Marri (KSA)
21 August; 14:00	3× (yellow card) 6× (suspension)		3× (yellow card) 5× (suspension)	JSC Gymnasium, Nanjing; Referees: Al-Dossary, Al-Marri (KSA)

==== Final round ====
Semifinals
21 August
Qatar	30
Saudi Arabia	25
21 August
South Korea	36
Bahrain	32

Gold medal match
23 August
Qatar	28
South Korea	21
Bronze medal match
23 August
Saudi Arabia	21
Bahrain	22

===== Semifinals =====
21 August; 16:00	Qatar	30–25	Saudi Arabia	JSC Gymnasium, Nanjing; Referees: Hizaki, Ikebuchi (JPN)
21 August; 16:00	Dhiab 9	(16–10)	Al-Mohsin 12	JSC Gymnasium, Nanjing; Referees: Hizaki, Ikebuchi (JPN)
21 August; 16:00	3× (yellow card) 9× (suspension)		3× (yellow card) 7× (suspension)	JSC Gymnasium, Nanjing; Referees: Hizaki, Ikebuchi (JPN)

21 August; 18:00	South Korea	36–32	Bahrain	JSC Gymnasium, Nanjing; Referees: Al-Marzouqi, Al-Nuaimi (UAE)
21 August; 18:00	Kim Y. 11	(19–11)	Al-Haddad 10	JSC Gymnasium, Nanjing; Referees: Al-Marzouqi, Al-Nuaimi (UAE)
21 August; 18:00	3× (yellow card) 7× (suspension)		3× (yellow card) 2× (suspension)	JSC Gymnasium, Nanjing; Referees: Al-Marzouqi, Al-Nuaimi (UAE)

===== Bronze medal match =====
23 August; 15:00	Saudi Arabia	21–22	Bahrain	JSC Gymnasium, Nanjing; Referees: Bamatraf, Al-Suwaidi (QAT)
23 August; 15:00	Al-Mohsin 7	(10–12)	Al-Salatena 5	JSC Gymnasium, Nanjing; Referees: Bamatraf, Al-Suwaidi (QAT)
23 August; 15:00	4× (yellow card) 5× (suspension)		3× (yellow card) 6× (suspension)	JSC Gymnasium, Nanjing; Referees: Bamatraf, Al-Suwaidi (QAT)

===== Gold medal match =====
23 August; 17:00	Qatar	28–21	South Korea	JSC Gymnasium, Nanjing; Referees: Hizaki, Ikebuchi (JPN)
23 August; 17:00	Dhiab 7	(10–14)	Kim Y. 8	JSC Gymnasium, Nanjing; Referees: Hizaki, Ikebuchi (JPN)
23 August; 17:00	3× (yellow card) 1× (suspension)		3× (yellow card) 2× (suspension)	JSC Gymnasium, Nanjing; Referees: Hizaki, Ikebuchi (JPN)

=== Girls ===
Pos	Team	Pld	W	D	L	GF	GA	GD	Pts
1	South Korea	5	5	0	0	213	92	+121	10
2	Kazakhstan	5	4	0	1	141	113	+28	8
3	China	5	3	0	2	120	100	+20	6
4	Thailand	5	2	0	3	147	123	+24	4
5	Vietnam	5	1	0	4	85	137	−52	2
6	Mongolia	5	0	0	5	39	180	−141	0

Source: AHF

17 August; 13:30	Vietnam	12–25	Kazakhstan	NUT Gymnasium, Nanjing; Referees: Al-Suwaidi, Bamatraf (QAT)
17 August; 13:30	Hoàng 7	(7–14)	Baigabylova 12	NUT Gymnasium, Nanjing; Referees: Al-Suwaidi, Bamatraf (QAT)
17 August; 13:30	3× (yellow card) 2× (suspension)		3× (yellow card) 2× (suspension)	NUT Gymnasium, Nanjing; Referees: Al-Suwaidi, Bamatraf (QAT)

17 August; 15:10	Thailand	18–41	South Korea	NUT Gymnasium, Nanjing; Referees: Al-Muhafdeh, Mohamed (BHR)
17 August; 15:10	Wongchupan 8	(6–23)	Kang D. 10	NUT Gymnasium, Nanjing; Referees: Al-Muhafdeh, Mohamed (BHR)
17 August; 15:10	3× (yellow card) 3× (suspension)		3× (yellow card)	NUT Gymnasium, Nanjing; Referees: Al-Muhafdeh, Mohamed (BHR)

17 August; 16:50	Mongolia	0–10	China	NUT Gymnasium, Nanjing; Referees: Kim, Sin (PRK)
17 August; 16:50		(Walkover)		NUT Gymnasium, Nanjing; Referees: Kim, Sin (PRK)

18 August; 13:30	Kazakhstan	31–29	Thailand	NUT Gymnasium, Nanjing; Referees: Al-Dossary, Al-Marri (KSA)
18 August; 13:30	Khardina 8	(13–13)	Wongchupan 12	NUT Gymnasium, Nanjing; Referees: Al-Dossary, Al-Marri (KSA)
18 August; 13:30	3× (yellow card) 3× (suspension) 1× (red card)		4× (yellow card) 9× (suspension) 2× (red card)	NUT Gymnasium, Nanjing; Referees: Al-Dossary, Al-Marri (KSA)

18 August; 15:10	Mongolia	16–45	South Korea	NUT Gymnasium, Nanjing; Referees: Zhang, Ye (CHN)
18 August; 15:10	Nomin 6	(4–29)	Lee H. 8	NUT Gymnasium, Nanjing; Referees: Zhang, Ye (CHN)
18 August; 15:10	3× (yellow card) 1× (suspension)		2× (yellow card)	NUT Gymnasium, Nanjing; Referees: Zhang, Ye (CHN)

18 August; 16:50	Vietnam	11–33	China	NUT Gymnasium, Nanjing; Referees: Shakir, Kadhim (IRQ)
18 August; 16:50	Vu N. 4	(7–14)	Zhang T. 11	NUT Gymnasium, Nanjing; Referees: Shakir, Kadhim (IRQ)
18 August; 16:50	2× (yellow card) 4× (suspension)		3× (yellow card) 2× (suspension)	NUT Gymnasium, Nanjing; Referees: Shakir, Kadhim (IRQ)

20 August; 13:30	South Korea	40–13	Vietnam	NUT Gymnasium, Nanjing; Referees: Sadeghi, Shafaei (IRI)
20 August; 13:30	Lee M., Lee H. 6	(19–1)	Hoàng, Nguyễn 3	NUT Gymnasium, Nanjing; Referees: Sadeghi, Shafaei (IRI)
20 August; 13:30	1× (yellow card)		3× (yellow card) 2× (suspension)	NUT Gymnasium, Nanjing; Referees: Sadeghi, Shafaei (IRI)

20 August; 15:10	China	22–23	Kazakhstan	NUT Gymnasium, Nanjing; Referees: Al-Suwaidi, Bamatraf (QAT)
20 August; 15:10	Zhang T. 9	(10–11)	Abilda, Kazachenko 6	NUT Gymnasium, Nanjing; Referees: Al-Suwaidi, Bamatraf (QAT)
20 August; 15:10	3× (yellow card) 5× (suspension)		3× (yellow card) 2× (suspension)	NUT Gymnasium, Nanjing; Referees: Al-Suwaidi, Bamatraf (QAT)

20 August; 16:50	Thailand	51–4	Mongolia	NUT Gymnasium, Nanjing; Referees: Ye, Zhang (CHN)
20 August; 16:50	Yaemyim, Jantahom 10	(26–1)	Javzanpagmaa 3	NUT Gymnasium, Nanjing; Referees: Ye, Zhang (CHN)
20 August; 16:50	2× (yellow card) 2× (suspension)		3× (yellow card) 1× (suspension)	NUT Gymnasium, Nanjing; Referees: Ye, Zhang (CHN)

21 August; 13:30	Thailand	25–12	Vietnam	NUT Gymnasium, Nanjing; Referees: Kadhim, Shakir (IRQ)
21 August; 13:30	Yaemyim 8	(15–7)	Saly 4	NUT Gymnasium, Nanjing; Referees: Kadhim, Shakir (IRQ)
21 August; 13:30	2× (yellow card) 2× (suspension)		3× (yellow card) 5× (suspension)	NUT Gymnasium, Nanjing; Referees: Kadhim, Shakir (IRQ)

21 August; 15:10	Kazakhstan	37–5	Mongolia	NUT Gymnasium, Nanjing; Referees: Sin, Kim (PRK)
21 August; 15:10	Abilda, Shutko, Baigabylova 6	(16–2)	Nomin 2	NUT Gymnasium, Nanjing; Referees: Sin, Kim (PRK)
21 August; 15:10	2× (yellow card)		1× (yellow card)	NUT Gymnasium, Nanjing; Referees: Sin, Kim (PRK)

21 August; 16:50	South Korea	42–20	China	NUT Gymnasium, Nanjing; Referees: Al-Muhafdeh, Mohamed (BHR)
21 August; 16:50	Lee M. 8	(22–10)	Han 4	NUT Gymnasium, Nanjing; Referees: Al-Muhafdeh, Mohamed (BHR)
21 August; 16:50	3× (yellow card) 1× (suspension)		3× (yellow card) 4× (suspension)	NUT Gymnasium, Nanjing; Referees: Al-Muhafdeh, Mohamed (BHR)

23 August; 13:00	Vietnam	37–14	Mongolia	NUT Gymnasium, Nanjing; Referees: Kim, Sin (PRK)
23 August; 13:00	Vu N. 10	(17–3)	Javzanpagmaa 8	NUT Gymnasium, Nanjing; Referees: Kim, Sin (PRK)
23 August; 13:00	1× (yellow card) 1× (suspension)		3× (yellow card) 1× (suspension)	NUT Gymnasium, Nanjing; Referees: Kim, Sin (PRK)

23 August; 14:45	China	35–24	Thailand	NUT Gymnasium, Nanjing; Referees: Sadeghi, Shafaei (IRI)
23 August; 14:45	Suo 10	(16–10)	Wongchupan 7	NUT Gymnasium, Nanjing; Referees: Sadeghi, Shafaei (IRI)
23 August; 14:45	3× (yellow card) 7× (suspension)		4× (yellow card) 4× (suspension) 2× (red card)	NUT Gymnasium, Nanjing; Referees: Sadeghi, Shafaei (IRI)

23 August; 16:30	South Korea	45–25	Kazakhstan	NUT Gymnasium, Nanjing; Referees: Al-Dossary, Al-Marri (KSA)
23 August; 16:30	Yu 7	(24–12)	Abilda 6	NUT Gymnasium, Nanjing; Referees: Al-Dossary, Al-Marri (KSA)
23 August; 16:30	2× (yellow card) 4× (suspension)		3× (yellow card) 1× (suspension)	NUT Gymnasium, Nanjing; Referees: Al-Dossary, Al-Marri (KSA)
