= Bahrain at the 2026 Asian Games =

- IOC code: BRN
- NOC: Bahrain Olympic Committee

in Aichi–Nagoya, Japan September 19 – October 4, 2026
- Competitors: 127 in 20 sports
- Medals Ranked 10th: Gold 11 Silver 5 Bronze 6 Total 22

Asian Games appearances (overview)
- 1974; 1978; 1982; 1986; 1990; 1994; 1998; 2002; 2006; 2010; 2014; 2018; 2022; 2026

Bahrain competed at the 2026 Asian Games in Nagoya, Aichi Prefecture, Japan from September 19 to October 4, 2026. The country won 22 medals (11 gold, 5 silver and 6 bronze), ranking 10th in the medal total, the majority of them came from athletics.

== Medalists ==
The following Bahrain competitors won medals at the Games.

Medal	Name	Sport	Event	Date	Ref.
Gold	Mikhail Arkhangelskiy	Swimming	Men's 50m Butterfly	24 September 2026	
Gold	Winfred Yavi	Athletics	Women's 10,000m	24 September 2026	
Gold	Musa Isah; Aisha Abdullah; Alaa Sami; Salwa Naser	Athletics	4 x 400m Relay Mixed	24 September 2026	
Gold	Birhanu Balew	Athletics	Men's 10,000m	25 September 2026	
Gold	Shitaye Habte	Athletics	Women's marathon	26 September 2026	
Gold	Nelly Korir	Athletics	Women's 1500m	26 September 2026	
Gold	Salwa Naser	Athletics	Women's 400m	26 September 2026	
Gold	Winfred Yavi	Athletics	Women's 3000m Steeplechase	27 September 2026	
Gold	Winfred Yavi	Athletics	Women's 5000m	28 September 2026	
Gold	Birhanu Balew	Athletics	Men's 5000m	29 September 2026	
Gold	National handball team Mohamed Rabia; Hesham Isa; Salman Al-Showaikh; Ahmed Kadhem; Ahmed Jalal; Mohamed Ali; Abdulla Abdulkarim; Sayed Shubbar; Hasan Madan; Ali Mohamed; Ahmed Eid; Jasim Khamis; Hasan Merza; Mohamed Habib; Mohamed Habib Naser; Husain Al-Sayyad	Handball	Men	29 September 2026	
Silver	Diana Pogosian	Mixed martial arts	Women's Modern -54kg	22 September 2026	
Silver	Mukhammad Nabiev	Mixed martial arts	Men's Traditional -77kg	22 September 2026	
Silver	Alina Marushchak	Weightlifting	Women's 86kg All Groups	29 September 2026	
Silver	Nelly Korir	Athletics	Women's 800m	29 September 2026	
Silver	Aisha Abdullah; Sufian Abdulghani; Zainab Fyofuoba; Salwa Naser	Athletics	Women's 4 x 400m Relay	29 September 2026	
Bronze	Albert Kiptoo	Athletics	Men's 10,000m	25 September 2026	
Bronze	Edidiong Odiong	Athletics	Women's 100m	25 September 2026	
Bronze	Ingrid Segura	Weightlifting	Women's 69kg All Groups	27 September 2026	
Bronze	Gor Minasyan	Weightlifting	Men's 110kg All Groups	29 September 2026	
Bronze	Sukhrob Boqiev	Judo	Men -66 kg	30 September 2026	
Bronze	Shamil Sharipov	Wrestling	Men's Freestyle 125kg	2 October 2026	

== Competitors ==
The following is a list of the number of competitors representing Bahrain that will participate at the Asian Games:

Sport	Men	Women	Total
3x3 basketball	4	0	4
Athletics	17	17	34
Badminton	1	0	1
Basketball	12	0	12
Boxing	4	1	5
Cycling	2	0	2
Equestrian	0	2	2
Esports	6	0	6
Handball	16	0	16
Judo	6	1	7
Ju-jitsu	2	0	2
Kurash	1	0	1
Mixed martial arts	3	1	4
Shooting	3	4	7
Swimming	5	4	9
Table tennis	3	0	3
Taewondo	0	2	2
Triathlon	1	0	1
Weightlifting	2	2	4
Wrestling	5	0	5
Total	93	34	127

== Basketball ==
Summary

Team	Event	Group Stage				Quarterfinals	Semifinals	Final / BM	
Team	Event	Opposition Score	Opposition Score	Opposition Score	Rank	Opposition Score	Opposition Score	Opposition Score	Rank
Bahrain men's	Men's 5x5 tournament	Philippines; W 89–85	China; L 59–105	Kazakhstan; W 101–78	2 Q	Iran; L 74–79	Did not advance		6
Bahrain men's	Men's 3x3 tournament	Chinese Taipei; L 2–21	Indonesia; L 10–14	Qatar; L 15–21	4	Did not advance			16

=== Men's 5x5 tournament ===
Team roster

- Mohamed Buallay
- Elijah Thomas
- Ahmed Haji
- Ahmed Al-Derazi
- Ali Rashed
- Kelechi Ajukwa
- Uroš Ilić
- Ali Al-Haddad
- JaKarr Sampson
- Mohamed Juma
- Mustafa Rashed
- Ahmed Bindayneh

Preliminary Rounds – Group C

Pos	Team	Pld	W	L	PF	PA	PD	Pts	Qualification
1	China	3	3	0	309	181	+128	6	Quarterfinals
2	Bahrain	3	2	1	249	268	−19	5	Quarterfinals
3	Philippines	3	1	2	255	272	−17	4	
4	Kazakhstan	3	0	3	217	309	−92	3	

Source: AsianGames2026.org

11 September 2026
13:00

Report
Box score

Philippines	85–89	Bahrain
Scoring by quarter: 21–29, 22–20, 18–27, 24–13
Pts: Oftana 31; Rebs: Lucero 9 Asts: Lucero, Nocum 5		Pts: Sampson 24; Rebs: Sampson 13; Asts: Sampson 8

Aichi International Arena, Nagoya
Attendance: 7,557
Referees: Rabah Noujaim (LBN), Mohammad Taha (JOR), Lee Ji-youn (KOR)

12 September 2026
16:00

Report
Box score

Bahrain	59–105	China
Scoring by quarter: 11–32, 18–14, 13–25, 17–34
Pts: Sampson 17; Rebs: Sampson 5 Asts: Al-Derazi, Sampson 3		Pts: Liao 23; Rebs: Jiao, Yu 6 Asts: Pang 7

Aichi International Arena, Nagoya
Attendance: 8,181
Referees: Wissam Zein (SYR), Shigeyui Arisawa (JPN), Nattapong Jontapa (THA)

14 September 2026
10:00

Report
Box score

Bahrain	101–78	Kazakhstan
Scoring by quarter: 28–15, 27–24, 22–17, 24–22
Pts: Sampson 23; Rebs: Sampson 9 Asts: M. Rashed 8		Pts: Severgin 16; Rebs: Bykov 10; Asts: Neff 6

Aichi International Arena, Nagoya
Attendance: 6,360
Referees: Mohammad Tama (JOR), Shigeyuki Arisawa (JPN), Abdullah Al-Hejaili (KSA)

Quarterfinals

16 September 2026
13:00

Report
Box score

Iran	79–74	Bahrain
Scoring by quarter: 21–17, 22–17, 17–21, 19–19
Pts: Jamshidi 20; Rebs: Kazemi 11; Asts: Kazemi 10		Pts: M. Rashed 26; Rebs: Thomas 10; Asts: M. Rashed 12

Aichi International Arena, Nagoya
Attendance: 7,731
Referees: Rabah Noujaim (LBN), Shigeyuki Arisawa (JPN), Rakesh Ramalingaiah (IND)

=== Men's 3x3 tournament ===
Preliminary Rounds – Group C

Pos	Team	Pld	W	L	PF	PA	PD	Pts	Qualification
1	Qatar	3	3	0	49	37	+12	6	Quarterfinals
2	Chinese Taipei	3	2	1	58	37	+21	5	Play-ins
3	Indonesia	3	1	2	38	42	−4	4	Play-ins
4	Bahrain	3	0	3	27	56	−29	3	

Source: asiangames2026.org

21 September
18:55

Report

Chinese Taipei	21–2	Bahrain
Pts: Chang 9		Pts: Alanzoor 2

Kinjō-futō Station Square, Nagoya
Referees: Neoh Yuen (MAS), Liu Chee (MAS)

21 September
20:35

Report

Indonesia	14–10	Bahrain
Pts: Junior 5		Pts: Alanzoor, Qambar 4

Kinjō-futō Station Square, Nagoya
Referees: Li Caiyan (CHN), Kim Gain (KOR)

23 September
14:30

Report

Qatar	21–15	Bahrain
Pts: Mousa 8		Pts: Alansari 6

Kinjō-futō Station Square, Nagoya
Referees: Li Caiyan (CHN), Kim Gain (KOR)

== Handball ==
Team	Event	Group stage					Quarterfinal	Semifinal	Final / BM	
Team	Event	Opposition Score	Opposition Score	Opposition Score	Opposition Score	Rank	Opposition Score	Opposition Score	Opposition Score	Rank
Bahrain men's	Men's tournament	Kazakhstan; W 43–20	Iran; W 34–20	South Korea; W 30–21	Kuwait; W 28–25	1 Q	Hong Kong; W 37–16	Japan; W 35–31	Qatar; W 33–32	1st place, gold medalist(s)

=== Men's tournament ===
Team rosters

- Mohamed Rabia (10)
- Saleh Ali (6)
- Ahmed Hesham (12)
- Salman Al-Showaikh (13)
- Ahmed Kadhem (17)
- Ahmed Jalal (18)
- Mohamed Merza (21)
- Abdulla Abdulkarim (24)
- Sayed Shubbar (29)
- Hasan Madan (33)
- Ali Mohamed (64)
- Ahmed Eid (73)
- Jasim Khamis (77)
- Hasan Merza (88)
- Mohamed Habib (93)
- Mohamed Habib Naser (95)
- Husain Al-Sayyad (99)

Group Stage – Group B

Pos	Team	Pld	W	D	L	GF	GA	GD	Pts	Qualification
1	Bahrain	4	4	0	0	135	86	+49	8	Quarterfinals
2	South Korea	4	2	1	1	117	101	+16	5	Quarterfinals
3	Kuwait	4	2	0	2	117	97	+20	4	Quarterfinals
4	Iran	4	1	1	2	98	109	−11	3	Quarterfinals
5	Kazakhstan	4	0	0	4	84	158	−74	0	

Source: asiangames2026.org

20 September 2026; 12:30	Kazakhstan	20–43	Bahrain	Toyoda Gosei Memorial Gymnasium; Referees: Kawai, Usui (JPN)
20 September 2026; 12:30	Andrussyak, Oxikbayev 4	(8–20)	Al-Showaikh 9	Toyoda Gosei Memorial Gymnasium; Referees: Kawai, Usui (JPN)
20 September 2026; 12:30	5× (suspension)	Report	1× (suspension)	Toyoda Gosei Memorial Gymnasium; Referees: Kawai, Usui (JPN)

21 September 2026; 14:30	Iran	20–34	Bahrain	Toyoda Gosei Memorial Gymnasium; Referees: Ismoilov, Ismoilov (UZB)
21 September 2026; 14:30	Enayati 8	(6–15)	Al-Showaikh 7	Toyoda Gosei Memorial Gymnasium; Referees: Ismoilov, Ismoilov (UZB)
21 September 2026; 14:30	3× (suspension)	Report	1× (suspension) 1× (red card)	Toyoda Gosei Memorial Gymnasium; Referees: Ismoilov, Ismoilov (UZB)

23 September 2026; 17:30	South Korea	21–30	Bahrain	Toyoda Gosei Memorial Gymnasium; Referees: Zhou, Cheng (CHN)
23 September 2026; 17:30	Park K. 5	(10–12)	Naser 6	Toyoda Gosei Memorial Gymnasium; Referees: Zhou, Cheng (CHN)
23 September 2026; 17:30	1× (yellow card) 2× (suspension)	Report	3× (suspension)	Toyoda Gosei Memorial Gymnasium; Referees: Zhou, Cheng (CHN)

25 September 2026; 13:30	Bahrain	28–25	Kuwait	Kasugai City Gymnasium; Referees: Al-Wahibi, Al-Shahi (OMA)
25 September 2026; 13:30	Naser 6	(12–13)	S. Al-Adwani, Al-Mutawa 6	Kasugai City Gymnasium; Referees: Al-Wahibi, Al-Shahi (OMA)
25 September 2026; 13:30	1× (yellow card) 2× (suspension)	Report	1× (yellow card) 1× (suspension)	Kasugai City Gymnasium; Referees: Al-Wahibi, Al-Shahi (OMA)

Quarterfinals

26 September 2026; 18:00	Bahrain	37–16	Hong Kong	Kasugai City Gymnasium; Referees: Gheisarian, Gheisarian (IRI)
26 September 2026; 18:00	Abdulkarim 8	(18–8)	Wong K. 3	Kasugai City Gymnasium; Referees: Gheisarian, Gheisarian (IRI)
26 September 2026; 18:00		Report	3× (suspension)	Kasugai City Gymnasium; Referees: Gheisarian, Gheisarian (IRI)

Semifinals

28 September 2026; 15:00	Japan	31–35	Bahrain	Toyoda Gosei Memorial Gymnasium; Referees: Ismoilov, Ismoilov (UZB)
28 September 2026; 15:00	Nakata 8	(16–16)	Naser 8	Toyoda Gosei Memorial Gymnasium; Referees: Ismoilov, Ismoilov (UZB)
28 September 2026; 15:00	3× (suspension)	Report	3× (suspension) 1× (red card)	Toyoda Gosei Memorial Gymnasium; Referees: Ismoilov, Ismoilov (UZB)

Final

29 September 2026; 19:30	Bahrain	33–32	Qatar	Toyoda Gosei Memorial Gymnasium; Referees: Furukawa, Murata (JPN)
29 September 2026; 19:30	Jalal, Kadhem 7	(16–15)	Madadi 10	Toyoda Gosei Memorial Gymnasium; Referees: Furukawa, Murata (JPN)
29 September 2026; 19:30	6× (suspension)	Report	2× (suspension) 1× (red card)	Toyoda Gosei Memorial Gymnasium; Referees: Furukawa, Murata (JPN)

== Table tennis ==
Men

Athlete	Event	Round of 64	Round of 32	Round of 16	Quarterfinal	Semifinal	Final	
Athlete	Event	Opposition Result	Opposition Result	Opposition Result	Opposition Result	Opposition Result	Opposition Result	Rank
Mohamed Saleh	Singles	Bawm (LAO); W 4–1	Jang W-j (KOR); L 0–4	Did not advance				
Sanad Rashed	Singles	Bilal (PAK); W 4–0	Lin Y-j (TPE); L 0–4	Did not advance				
Mohamed Saleh; Sanad Rashed	Doubles	Ab Kasymov / At Kasymov (KGZ); W 3–0	Hsu H-c / Hu J-k (TPE); L 0–3	Did not advance				
Mohammed Alaali; Sayed Mahfoodh	Doubles	Bilal / Khan (PAK); W 3–0	Chew / Chua (SGP); L 0–3	Did not advance				

Team

Athlete	Event	Group stage				Round of 16	Quarterfinal	Semifinal	Final	
Athlete	Event	Opposition Score	Opposition Score	Opposition Score	Rank	Opposition Score	Opposition Score	Opposition Score	Opposition Score	Rank
Mohamed Saleh; Mohammed Alaali; Sanad Rashed; Sayed Mahfoodh	Men's	Chinese Taipei; L 0–3	Nepal; W 3–0	—N/a	2 Q	Kazakhstan; L 0–3	Did not advance			

== Triathlon ==
Athlete	Event	Time						Rank
Athlete	Event	Swim (0.75 km)	Trans 1	Bike (20 km)	Trans 2	Run (5 km)	Total	Rank
Omar Ali	Men's individual	9:42	0:40	29:26	0:20	16:42	56:50	19

== Wrestling ==
Bahrain entered five male wrestlers.

Key:

- VT (ranking points: 5–0 or 0–5) – Victory by fall.
- VB (ranking points: 5–0 or 0–5) – Victory by injury (VF for forfeit, VA for withdrawal or disqualification)
- PP (ranking points: 3–1 or 1–3) – Decision by points – the loser with technical points.
- PO (ranking points: 3–0 or 0–3) – Decision by points – the loser without technical points.
- ST (ranking points: 4–0 or 0–4) – Great superiority – the loser without technical points and a margin of victory of at least 8 (Greco-Roman) or 10 (freestyle) points.
- SP (ranking points: 4–1 or 1–4) – Technical superiority – the loser with technical points and a margin of victory of at least 8 (Greco-Roman) or 10 (freestyle) points.

Freestyle

Athlete	Event	Round of 32	Round of 16	Quarterfinal	Semifinal	Repechage	Final / BM	
Athlete	Event	Opposition Result	Opposition Result	Opposition Result	Opposition Result	Opposition Result	Opposition Result	Rank
Alibeg Alibegov	Men's –65 kg	Bye	Yun (KOR); L 5–5	Did not advance				
Magomedrasul Asluev	Men's –74 kg							
Khidir Saipudinov	Men's –86 kg	–	Malik (KGZ); L 5–9	Did not advance				
Magomed Sharipov	Men's –97 kg							
Shamil Sharipov	Men's – 125 kg	–	Kim (KOR); W 11–0	Turdubekov (KGZ); W 11–0	Buheeerdun (CHN); L 7–4^{VT}	–	Nambardagva (MGL); W 9–0	3rd place, bronze medalist(s)
