= Liu Guangcai =

Chinese politician

Liu Guangcai (November 1936 - June 1, 2006, Chinese: 刘广才), a native of Suining, Jiangsu Province, was a Chinese politician.

== Biography ==
In 1959, Liu Guangcai attended the Nanjing Institute of Chemical Technology (now Nanjing University of Technology), focusing on inorganic nonmetals. He became a member of the Chinese Communist Party (CCP) in March 1966. In June 1978, he assumed the position of deputy director of the Infrastructure Division within the Petrochemical Department of Anhui Province. In December 1979, he assumed the role of interim director of the Anhui Provincial Institute of Chemical Engineering. In September 1981, he assumed the position of vice-director of the Petrochemical Department of Anhui Province. In March 1983, he was appointed to the Standing Committee of the Anhui Provincial Committee of the CCP and the Standing Committee of the Anhui Provincial Scientific Committee. In March 1983, he served as a member of the Standing Committee of the CCP Anhui Provincial Committee and as Director of the Anhui Provincial Science Committee. In December 1984, he served as a member of the Standing Committee of the CCP Anhui Provincial Committee and as the Minister of the Organization Department of the CCP Anhui Provincial Committee. In February 1993, he served as a member of the Standing Committee of the CCP Anhui Provincial Committee, Minister of the Organization Department of the CCP Anhui Provincial Committee, and Vice Director of the Standing Committee of the Provincial People's Congress. In January 1995, he served as the Vice Director, Deputy Secretary of the Standing Committee of the People's Congress of the Anhui Provincial Committee of the CCP, and Minister of the Organization Department of the Provincial Committee. In January 2003, he held the positions of deputy director and Deputy Secretary of the Party Group of the Standing Committee of the Anhui Provincial People's Congress.

Liu Guangcai served as a delegate to both the 9th National People's Congress and the 14th National Congress of the Chinese Communist Party. He died on June 1, 2006, in Hefei.
