= Bhutan at the 2026 Asian Games =

- IOC code: BHU
- NOC: Bhutan Olympic Committee

in Aichi Prefecture and Nagoya, Japan 19 September – 4 October 2026
- Competitors: 13 (10 men and 3 women) in 4 sports
- Medals: Gold 0 Silver 0 Bronze 0 Total 0

Asian Games appearances (overview)
- 1986; 1990; 1994; 1998; 2002; 2006; 2010; 2014; 2018; 2022; 2026

Bhutan competed at the 2026 Asian Games in Nagoya, Aichi Prefecture, Japan, from 19 September to 4 October 2026.

== Competitors ==
The following is the list of number of competitors in the Games.

Sport	Men	Women	Total
Archery	6	1	7
Athletics	2	0	2
Boxing	2	1	3
Taekwondo	0	1	1
Total	10	3	13

== Archery ==
Recurve

Athlete	Event	Ranking round		Round of 48	Round of 32	Round of 16	Quarterfinals	Semifinals	Final / BM	
Athlete	Event	Score	Seed	Opposition Score	Opposition Score	Opposition Score	Opposition Score	Opposition Score	Opposition Score	Rank
Kinley Tshering	Men's individual	655	37Q	Dilshodi (TJK); W 7–1	Baasith (INA); W 6–4	Li (CHN); W 6–5	Lee (KOR); L 7–1	Did not advance		
Lam Dorji	Men's individual	659	31Q	Kursanaliev (KGZ); W 6–0	Golshani (KGZ); W 6–4	Kwok (HKG); W 6–4	Neeraj (IND); L 7–1	Did not advance		
Sonam Penjor	Men's individual	649	42	Did not advance						
Kinley Tshering; Lam Dorji; Sonam Penjor	Men's team	1963	14Q	Bye	Bye	Japan (JPN) L 0–6	Did not advance			

Compound

Athlete	Event	Ranking round		Round of 48	Round of 32	Round of 16	Quarterfinals	Semifinals	Final / BM	
Athlete	Event	Score	Seed	Opposition Score	Opposition Score	Opposition Score	Opposition Score	Opposition Score	Opposition Score	Rank
Kezang Norbu	Men's individual	687	37	Did not advance						
Tandin Dorji	Men's individual	710	4Q	—N/a	—N/a	Wadih (LBN); W 147–135	Chen (TPE); L 144–145	Did not advance		
Tshetum Gaytshey	Men's individual	693	30Q	—N/a	—N/a	Jongho (KOR); L 143–148	Did not advance			
Kezang Norbu; Tandin Dorji; Tshetum Gaytshey	Men's team	2090	11Q	—N/a	—N/a	—N/a	India (IND) L 232–235	Did not advance		
Dorji Dolma	Women's individual	670	42Q	Mariko (JPN); W 138–134	Taniparthi (IND); L 140–149	Did not advance				
Kezang Norbu; Tandin Dorji; Tshetum Gaytshey; Dorji Dolma	Mixed team	1380	13Q	—N/a	—N/a	—N/a	Vietnam (VIE) L 150–158	Did not advance		

Key

- Q = Qualified for the next round
- W = Win
- L = Loss

== Athletics ==
Long distance runners Gawa Zangpo and Sangay will represent Bhutan in the 2026 Asian Games.

Track events

Athlete	Event	Final	
Athlete	Event	Result	Rank
Gawa Zangpo	Men's 5000 m	14:48.43	14
Sangay	Men's 5000 m	15:16.14	16
Sangay	Men's 10,000 m	32:56.18	10

Key

- Note–Ranks given for track events are within the athlete's heat only
- Q = Qualified for the next round
- q = Qualified for the next round as a fastest loser or, in field events, by position without achieving the qualifying target
- NR = National record
- N/A = Round not applicable for the event
- Bye = Athlete not required to compete in round

== Boxing ==
Three boxers will compete for Bhutan in the 2026 Asian Games: Dorji Migma, Kinley and the only woman in the contingent Kinga Wangmo

Athlete	Event	Round of 32	Round of 16	Quarterfinals	Semifinals	Final	
Athlete	Event	Opposition Result	Opposition Result	Opposition Result	Opposition Result	Opposition Result	Rank
Dorji Migma	Men's 55 kg	Utsob (BAN); L 0–5	Did not advance				
Kinley	Men's 60 kg	Abu Jajeh (JOR); L 0–5	Did not advance				
Kinga Wangmo	Women's 54 kg	Maryam (BRN); W 5–0	Zhao Xuan (CHN); L 0–5	Did not advance			

== Taekwondo ==
Athlete	Event	Round of 16	Quarterfinals	Semifinals	Final	
Athlete	Event	Opposition Result	Opposition Result	Opposition Result	Opposition Result	Rank
Dorjee Yangkee	Women's –67 kg	Kwak Min-ju (KOR)	–	–	–	
