= Wrestling at the 2026 Asian Games – Men's freestyle 125 kg =

Men's freestyle 125 kg at the 2026 Asian Games
- Venue: Inae Sports Center
- Date: 2 October 2026
- Competitors: 12 from 12 nations

Medalists
gold medal	Amir Hossein Zare	Iran
silver medal	Buheeerdun	China
bronze medal	Shamil Sharipov	Bahrain
bronze medal	Yedige Kassimbek	Kazakhstan

The men's 125 kilograms freestyle wrestling competition at the 2026 Asian Games was held on 2 October 2026 at the Inae Sports Center in Nagoya. The event was competed by 12 competitors. Amir Hossein Zare of Iran won the gold medal after defeating Buheeerdun of China in the final. Shamil Sharipov of Bahrain and Yedige Kassimbek of Kazakhstan won the bronze medals.

== Background ==
Men's freestyle wrestling was first contested at the 1954 Asian Games in Manila. It has been contested at every edition of the Asian Games since then.

Iran's Amir Hossein Zare was the defending champion, having won the gold medal in the men's freestyle 125 kg event at the 2022 Asian Games in Hangzhou. Mönkhtöriin Lkhagvagerel of Mongolia won the silver medal while Aiaal Lazarev of Kyrgyzstan and Buheeerdun of China won the bronze medals. Of the medal winners at the previous Asian Games, Zare and Buheeerdun took part in the 2026 edition.

Zare had won a silver medal at the 2024 Summer Olympics and a bronze medal at the 2020 Summer Olympics. He is also a two-time World Champion, having won the gold medal in the 2023 and the 2025 World Wrestling Championships. He also won the gold medal in the 2026 Asian Wrestling Championships. Bahrain's Shamil Sharipov was the bronze medalist in the 125 kg category at the 2025 World Wrestling Championships in Zagreb. He also won bronze medals at the 2024 and 2025 Asian Wrestling Championships, and a silver medal at the 2026 edition, where he lost to Zare in the final.

Buheeerdun was the bronze medallist in the 125 kg category at the 2023 and 2024 Asian Wrestling Championships, while Kazakhstan's Yedige Kassimbek won the bronze medal at the 2026 Asian Championships in the same category defeating Buheeerdun in the bronze medal bout.

== Format ==
The freestyle wrestling competition was competed as a single-elimination tournament. The two finalists competed against each other for the gold and silver medals. Each wrestler who loses to one of the two finalists moves into the repechage rounds, which is used to determine the bronze medals. The losers of the semifinals compete against the remaining repechage opponent from their half of the bracket in the bronze medal bout.

== Schedule ==
The men's freestyle 125 kg event was held on 2 October 2026 held at the Inae Sports Center in Nagoya.

All times are Japan Standard Time (UTC+09:00)

Date	Time	Event
Friday, 2 October 2026	10:30	1/8 finals
Friday, 2 October 2026	10:30	1/4 finals
Friday, 2 October 2026	10:30	Semifinals
Friday, 2 October 2026	10:30	Repechages
Friday, 2 October 2026	18:00	Finals

== Summary ==
The event was competed by 14 competitors. Zare won his first two rounds by technical superiority to reach the semifinals, where he defeated Kassimbek. Kassimbek led the match 3-1 going into the final 30 seconds of the match. However, Zare scored two points for a takedown in the final few seconds of the match to tie the score and win the match on tie-breaker criteria. Buheeerdun was the other finalist. He advanced to the final after securing wins in his first two rounds by technical superiority before defeating Sharipov in the semifinals. Buheeerdun was trailing 0–7 against Sharipov, but staged a comeback to win the match by pinning his opponent.

In the final, Zare defeated Buheeerdun 12–2 by technical superiority to successfully defend his Asian Games title. Sharipov and Kassimbek won the two bronze medals. Sharipov defeated Batbayaryn 9–0 in his bronze-medal bout, while Kassimbek defeated Saparov 14–4 by technical superiority to claim the other bronze medal.

== Results ==
Legend

- F — Won by fall

=== Main bracket ===
1/8 finals
Shamil Sharipov (BRN)	11
Kim Gwan-uk (KOR)	0
Buheeerdun (CHN)	10
Raj Yadav (NEP)	0
Taiki Yamamoto (JPN)	0
Amir Hossein Zare (IRI)	10
Yedige Kassimbek (KAZ)	8
Rajat Ruhal (IND)	3

1/4 finals
Arslanbek Turdubekov (KGZ)	0
Shamil Sharipov (BRN)	11
Buheeerdun (CHN)	11
Batbayaryn Nambardagva (MGL)	0
Zyýamuhammet Saparow (TKM)	0
Amir Hossein Zare (IRI)	11
Yedige Kassimbek (KAZ)	14
Khasanboy Rakhimov (UZB)	4

Semifinals
Shamil Sharipov (BRN)	7
Buheeerdun (CHN)	4^{F}
Amir Hossein Zare (IRI)	3
Yedige Kassimbek (KAZ)	3

Final
Buheeerdun (CHN)	2
Amir Hossein Zare (IRI)	12

=== Repechage ===
Repechage
Raj Yadav (NEP)	0
Batbayaryn Nambardagva (MGL)	6^{F}
Taiki Yamamoto (JPN)	2
Zyýamuhammet Saparow (TKM)	4

Bronze medal matches
Batbayaryn Nambardagva (MGL)	0
Shamil Sharipov (BRN)	9
Zyýamuhammet Saparow (TKM)	4
Yedige Kassimbek (KAZ)	14

== Final standing ==
Rank	Athlete
1st place, gold medalist(s)	Amir Hossein Zare (IRI)
2nd place, silver medalist(s)	Buheeerdun (CHN)
3rd place, bronze medalist(s)	Shamil Sharipov (BRN)
3rd place, bronze medalist(s)	Yedige Kassimbek (KAZ)
5	Batbayaryn Nambardagva (MGL)
5	Zyýamuhammet Saparow (TKM)
7	Khasanboy Rakhimov (UZB)
8	Rajat Ruhal (IND)
9	Taiki Yamamoto (JPN)
10	Arslanbek Turdubekov (KGZ)
11	Kim Gwan-uk (KOR)
12	Raj Yadav (NEP)
