= Athletics at the 2026 Asian Games – Men's 5000 metres =

Men's 5000 metres at the 2026 Asian Games
- Venue: Mizuho Park Athletic Stadium, Nagoya
- Date: 29 September 2026
- Competitors: 19 from 14 nations
- Winning time: 13:30.79

Medalists
gold medal	Kazuto Iizawa	Japan
silver medal	Gulveer Singh	India
bronze medal	Nagiya Mori	Japan

The men's 5,000 metres competition at the 2026 Asian Games took place from 29 September 2026 at the Mizuho Park Athletic Stadium in Nagoya, Japan.

== Schedule ==
All times are Japan Standard Time (UTC+09:00)

Schedule
Date	Time	Event
29 September 2026	20:15	Final

== Records ==
Prior to this competition, the existing world, Asian and Games records were as follows.

World Record	Joshua Cheptegei (UGA)	12:35.36	Monaco	14 August 2020
Asian Record	Birhanu Balew (BHR)	12:47.73	Oslo, Norway	10 June 2026
Games Record	Birhanu Balew (BHR)	13:17.40	Guangzhou, China	4 October 2023

== Results ==
Place	Athlete	Nation	Time	Notes
1st place, gold medalist(s)	Birhanu Balew	Bahrain	13:30.79	GR
2nd place, silver medalist(s)	Tomonori Yamaguchi	Japan	13:31.43	SB
3rd place, bronze medalist(s)	Gulveer Singh	India	13:32.75	
4	Nagiya Mori	Japan	13:35.55	
5	Yacine Guermali	Philippines	13:44.61	
6	Nursultan Keneshbekov	Kyrgyzstan	13:49.07	SB
7	Maxim Frolowskij	Kazakhstan	14:00.60	PB
8	Abdikani Hamid	Bahrain	14:02.19	
9	Mukesh Pal	Nepal	14:03.61	PB
10	Park Jae-woo	South Korea	14:09.69	
11	Sonny Wagdos	Philippines	14:29.42	PB
12	Abdullah Al Haswali	Yemen	14:29.57	SB
13	Gansukh Bat-Erdene	Mongolia	14:45.74	
14	Gawa Zangpo	Bhutan	14:48.43	
15	Bat-Ochir Ser-Od	Mongolia	14:53.41	
16	Sangay	Bhutan	15:16.14	
17	Terence Lai	Cambodia	15:19.19	
18	Ahmed Wridat	Palestine	15:55.28	
—	Avinash Sable	India	DNS	
