= Handball at the 2026 Asian Games – Men's tournament =

Men's handball at the 2026 Asian Games
- Venues: Kasugai City Gymnasium; Toyoda Gosei Memorial Gymnasium
- Dates: 19–29 September 2026
- Competitors: 144 from 9 nations

Medalists
gold medal	Bahrain
silver medal	Qatar
bronze medal	Japan

The men's handball tournament at the 2026 Asian Games was held in Inazawa and Kasugai, Japan from 19 to 29 September 2026.

== Schedule ==
The schedule of the tournament is as follows.

G	Group phase	¼	Quarterfinals	½	Semifinals	B	Bronze medal match	F	Gold medal match

19th Sat	20th Sun	21st Mon	22nd Tue	23rd Wed	24th Thu	25th Fri	26th Sat	27th Sun	28th Mon	29th Tue	
G	G	G	G	G		G	¼		½	B	F

== Draw ==
The draw for the men's tournament was held on 23 July 2026.

Group A
Pos	Team
A1	Qatar
A2	Japan
A3	China
A4	Hong Kong

Group B
Pos	Team
B1	Bahrain
B2	Kuwait
B3	South Korea
B4	Iran
B5	Kazakhstan

== Rosters ==
Bahrain	China	Hong Kong	Iran
Mohamed Rabia; Hesham Isa; Salman Alshowaikh; Ahmed Kadhem; Ahmed Fadhul; Mohamed Ali; Abdulla Abdulkarim; Sayed Shubbar; Hasan Madan; Ali Mohamed; Ahmed Eid; Jasim Khamis; Hasan Ali; Mohamed Ahmed; Mohamed Mohamed; Husain Alsayyad	Zhao Kai; Zhang Tianjin; Li Xiangjie; Wang Xiaofeng; Zhou Ao; Xie Qinglong; Chen Xu; Zhang Jianjie; Song Ziyang; He Xinian; Hu Jinming; Sun Fangwei; Chen Minghao; Li Shuo; Rao Yuanyuan; Wang Hao	Chan Tsz Long; Hon Hok Hei; Wong Ling Chung; Tse Wing Fai; Lee Siu Chung; Law Chun Yiu; Leung Laam Hei; Zou Yuk To; Lau Ka Yiu; Lee Hau Yu; Wong Kin; Kan Yik Man; Kan Yik Fai; Chung Shu Yin; Yip Chi Kuen; Lin Yun To	Milad Ghalandari; Mohammadhossein Farokhi; Omid Enayati; Ali Heidarian; Mohammad Siavoshishahenayati; Mehran Rahnama; Saber Heidari; Mohammadreza Oraei; Mohammadmahdi Behnamnia; Roohollah Adelkhani; Mohammadreza Kazemi; Ali Amiryousefi; Omid Robat; Alireza Pirzadeh; Behshad Fatehizadeh; Younes Asari
Japan	Kazakhstan	South Korea	Kuwait
Takumi Nakamura; Kota Nakata; Taiga Tsutaya; Tomoya Sakurai; Daisuke Tanaka; Adam Baig; Soya Ichihara; Naoki Sugioka; Jin Watanabe; Yuta Iwashita; Tatsuki Yoshino; Hayato Goto; Hiroyasu Tamakawa; Naoki Fujisaka; Akio Hashimoto; Kotaro Mizumachi	Assylkhan Nabiyev; Daulet Muratov; Ravil Osmanov; Mikhail Salmov; Askan Oxikbayev; Odilzhan Gaziyev; Adam Makhmudov; Dauren Tilekkabyl; Asset Kali; Rustam Andrussyak; Nikita Yakubovich; Daniil Yakubovich; Ilya Pobochenko; Davlatbek Nadyrbekov; Azizzhan Rakimzhanov; Daniyar Irismetov	Tae-gwan Kim; Jea-woo Song; Kwang-soon Park; Jin-young Kim; Yo-seb Lee; Min Ha; Min-mo Yeon; Min-jun Won; Dong-uk Kim; Jin-ho Kim; Jin-soo Jeon; Rak-chan Kim; Seung Park; Yeon-bin Kim; Yu-sung Jin; Jae-yong Park	Abdullah Alkhamees; Saleh Ali; Abdulaziz Alshammari; Abdulaziz Najem; Humood Aladwani; Hasan Safar; Saif Aladwani; Fawaz Almashari; Mohammad Ghadanfar; Abdulaziz Salmeen; Husain Mohammad; Haider Dashti; Yousef Najem; Husain Almutawa; Abdulrahman Alshammari; Mohammad Buyabes
Qatar
Ahmad Madadi; Rafael Capote; Frankis Marzo; Abdulrazzaq Murad; Saifdinne Dhib; Eldar Memisevic; Nasreddine Megdich; Firas Zemzemi; Abdelrahman Abdalla; Ahmed Abdelrhem; Youssef Ali; Amine Guehis; Malek Soussou; Mohamedali Hamam; Ameen Zakkar; Ebrahim Ebaid

== Group stage ==
All times are local, Japan Standard Time (UTC+9).

=== Group A ===
Pos	Team	Pld	W	D	L	GF	GA	GD	Pts	Qualification
1	Qatar	3	3	0	0	107	70	+37	6	Quarterfinals
2	Japan (H)	3	2	0	1	103	81	+22	4	Quarterfinals
3	China	3	1	0	2	90	87	+3	2	Quarterfinals
4	Hong Kong	3	0	0	3	60	122	−62	0	Quarterfinals

Source: asiangames2026.org
(H) Hosts

20 September 2026; 15:00	China	27–31	Japan	Toyoda Gosei Memorial Gymnasium; Referees: Al-Wahibi, Al-Shahi (OMA)
20 September 2026; 15:00	Sun, Xie 5	(12–16)	Sugioka 8	Toyoda Gosei Memorial Gymnasium; Referees: Al-Wahibi, Al-Shahi (OMA)
20 September 2026; 15:00	1× (yellow card) 6× (suspension)	Report	1× (yellow card) 2× (suspension)	Toyoda Gosei Memorial Gymnasium; Referees: Al-Wahibi, Al-Shahi (OMA)

20 September 2026; 17:30	Hong Kong	17–40	Qatar	Toyoda Gosei Memorial Gymnasium; Referees: Ali, Al-Aradi (BHR)
20 September 2026; 17:30	Lin 5	(8–19)	Marzo, Megdich 7	Toyoda Gosei Memorial Gymnasium; Referees: Ali, Al-Aradi (BHR)
20 September 2026; 17:30	1× (suspension)	Report	3× (suspension)	Toyoda Gosei Memorial Gymnasium; Referees: Ali, Al-Aradi (BHR)

21 September 2026; 12:00	Hong Kong	17–44	Japan	Toyoda Gosei Memorial Gymnasium; Referees: Gheisarian, Gheisarian (IRI)
21 September 2026; 12:00	Lin, Wong K. 4	(10–19)	Nakata 7	Toyoda Gosei Memorial Gymnasium; Referees: Gheisarian, Gheisarian (IRI)
21 September 2026; 12:00	2× (suspension)	Report	1× (suspension)	Toyoda Gosei Memorial Gymnasium; Referees: Gheisarian, Gheisarian (IRI)

21 September 2026; 19:30	China	25–30	Qatar	Toyoda Gosei Memorial Gymnasium; Referees: Pak, Cha (KOR)
21 September 2026; 19:30	Sun 6	(15–15)	Marzo 8	Toyoda Gosei Memorial Gymnasium; Referees: Pak, Cha (KOR)
21 September 2026; 19:30	1× (yellow card) 7× (suspension) 5× (red card)	Report	1× (yellow card) 6× (suspension)	Toyoda Gosei Memorial Gymnasium; Referees: Pak, Cha (KOR)

23 September 2026; 15:00	China	38–26	Hong Kong	Toyoda Gosei Memorial Gymnasium; Referees: Al-Enezi, Al-Naseem (KUW)
23 September 2026; 15:00	Song 7	(20–12)	Kan Y.M., Lin 6	Toyoda Gosei Memorial Gymnasium; Referees: Al-Enezi, Al-Naseem (KUW)
23 September 2026; 15:00	4× (suspension) 1× (red card)	Report	1× (yellow card)	Toyoda Gosei Memorial Gymnasium; Referees: Al-Enezi, Al-Naseem (KUW)

25 September 2026; 15:30	Qatar	37–28	Japan	Kasugai City Gymnasium; Referees: Ismoilov, Ismoilov (UZB)
25 September 2026; 15:30	Marzo 9	(18–13)	Tsutaya, Yoshino 5	Kasugai City Gymnasium; Referees: Ismoilov, Ismoilov (UZB)
25 September 2026; 15:30	4× (suspension)	Report	2× (suspension) 1× (red card)	Kasugai City Gymnasium; Referees: Ismoilov, Ismoilov (UZB)

=== Group B ===
Pos	Team	Pld	W	D	L	GF	GA	GD	Pts	Qualification
1	Bahrain	4	4	0	0	135	86	+49	8	Quarterfinals
2	South Korea	4	2	1	1	117	101	+16	5	Quarterfinals
3	Kuwait	4	2	0	2	117	97	+20	4	Quarterfinals
4	Iran	4	1	1	2	98	109	−11	3	Quarterfinals
5	Kazakhstan	4	0	0	4	84	158	−74	0	

Source: asiangames2026.org

19 September 2026; 12:30	Iran	24–26	Kuwait	Toyoda Gosei Memorial Gymnasium; Referees: Zhou, Cheng (CHN)
19 September 2026; 12:30	Asari, Oraei 6	(15–13)	Abdula. Al-Shammari 11	Toyoda Gosei Memorial Gymnasium; Referees: Zhou, Cheng (CHN)
19 September 2026; 12:30	1× (yellow card) 5× (suspension)	Report	1× (yellow card) 2× (suspension)	Toyoda Gosei Memorial Gymnasium; Referees: Zhou, Cheng (CHN)

20 September 2026; 12:30	Kazakhstan	20–43	Bahrain	Toyoda Gosei Memorial Gymnasium; Referees: Kawai, Usui (JPN)
20 September 2026; 12:30	Andrussyak, Oxikbayev 4	(8–20)	Al-Showaikh 9	Toyoda Gosei Memorial Gymnasium; Referees: Kawai, Usui (JPN)
20 September 2026; 12:30	5× (suspension)	Report	1× (suspension)	Toyoda Gosei Memorial Gymnasium; Referees: Kawai, Usui (JPN)

21 September 2026; 14:30	Iran	20–34	Bahrain	Toyoda Gosei Memorial Gymnasium; Referees: Ismoilov, Ismoilov (UZB)
21 September 2026; 14:30	Enayati 8	(6–15)	Al-Showaikh 7	Toyoda Gosei Memorial Gymnasium; Referees: Ismoilov, Ismoilov (UZB)
21 September 2026; 14:30	3× (suspension)	Report	1× (suspension) 1× (red card)	Toyoda Gosei Memorial Gymnasium; Referees: Ismoilov, Ismoilov (UZB)

21 September 2026; 17:00	South Korea	26–23	Kuwait	Toyoda Gosei Memorial Gymnasium; Referees: Furukawa, Murata (JPN)
21 September 2026; 17:00	Kim Jin-y. 6	(12–12)	H. Al-Adwani, Al-Mutawa 6	Toyoda Gosei Memorial Gymnasium; Referees: Furukawa, Murata (JPN)
21 September 2026; 17:00	1× (yellow card) 3× (suspension)	Report	1× (yellow card) 2× (suspension)	Toyoda Gosei Memorial Gymnasium; Referees: Furukawa, Murata (JPN)

22 September 2026; 15:00	Kuwait	43–19	Kazakhstan	Toyoda Gosei Memorial Gymnasium; Referees: Abo, Al-Rashed (JOR)
22 September 2026; 15:00	Al-Mutawa 10	(20–12)	Salmov, D. Yakubovich 4	Toyoda Gosei Memorial Gymnasium; Referees: Abo, Al-Rashed (JOR)
22 September 2026; 15:00	2× (suspension)	Report	3× (suspension)	Toyoda Gosei Memorial Gymnasium; Referees: Abo, Al-Rashed (JOR)

22 September 2026; 17:30	Iran	26–26	South Korea	Toyoda Gosei Memorial Gymnasium; Referees: Al-Shahi, Al-Wahibi (OMA)
22 September 2026; 17:30	Asari, Heidarian 7	(14–13)	Kim Jin-y. 7	Toyoda Gosei Memorial Gymnasium; Referees: Al-Shahi, Al-Wahibi (OMA)
22 September 2026; 17:30	1× (yellow card) 5× (suspension)	Report	1× (suspension)	Toyoda Gosei Memorial Gymnasium; Referees: Al-Shahi, Al-Wahibi (OMA)

23 September 2026; 12:30	Kazakhstan	23–28	Iran	Toyoda Gosei Memorial Gymnasium; Referees: Furukawa, Murata (JPN)
23 September 2026; 12:30	Oxikbayev 6	(13–16)	Ghalandari 5	Toyoda Gosei Memorial Gymnasium; Referees: Furukawa, Murata (JPN)
23 September 2026; 12:30	3× (suspension)	Report	1× (yellow card) 3× (suspension)	Toyoda Gosei Memorial Gymnasium; Referees: Furukawa, Murata (JPN)

23 September 2026; 17:30	South Korea	21–30	Bahrain	Toyoda Gosei Memorial Gymnasium; Referees: Zhou, Cheng (CHN)
23 September 2026; 17:30	Park K. 5	(10–12)	Naser 6	Toyoda Gosei Memorial Gymnasium; Referees: Zhou, Cheng (CHN)
23 September 2026; 17:30	1× (yellow card) 2× (suspension)	Report	3× (suspension)	Toyoda Gosei Memorial Gymnasium; Referees: Zhou, Cheng (CHN)

25 September 2026; 13:30	Bahrain	28–25	Kuwait	Kasugai City Gymnasium; Referees: Al-Wahibi, Al-Shahi (OMA)
25 September 2026; 13:30	Naser 6	(12–13)	S. Al-Adwani, Al-Mutawa 6	Kasugai City Gymnasium; Referees: Al-Wahibi, Al-Shahi (OMA)
25 September 2026; 13:30	1× (yellow card) 2× (suspension)	Report	1× (yellow card) 1× (suspension)	Kasugai City Gymnasium; Referees: Al-Wahibi, Al-Shahi (OMA)

25 September 2026; 17:30	Kazakhstan	22–44	South Korea	Kasugai City Gymnasium; Referees: Furukawa, Murata (JPN)
25 September 2026; 17:30	Oxikbayev, Tilekkabyl 5	(10–23)	Kim Y. 7	Kasugai City Gymnasium; Referees: Furukawa, Murata (JPN)
25 September 2026; 17:30	3× (suspension) 1× (red card)	Report	2× (suspension)	Kasugai City Gymnasium; Referees: Furukawa, Murata (JPN)

== Knockout stage ==
=== Bracket ===
Quarterfinals
26 September
Japan	37
Kuwait	32
26 September
Bahrain	37
Hong Kong	16
26 September
South Korea	32
China	26
26 September
Qatar	31
Iran	25

Semifinals
28 September
Japan	31
Bahrain	35
28 September
South Korea	30
Qatar	32

Gold medal
29 September
Bahrain	33
Qatar	32
Bronze medal
29 September
Japan	37
South Korea	32

=== Quarterfinals ===
26 September 2026; 12:00	Japan	37–32	Kuwait	Kasugai City Gymnasium; Referees: Pak, Cha (KOR)
26 September 2026; 12:00	Nakata, Sugioka 9	(23–12)	S. Al-Adwani 15	Kasugai City Gymnasium; Referees: Pak, Cha (KOR)
26 September 2026; 12:00	3× (suspension)	Report	4× (suspension)	Kasugai City Gymnasium; Referees: Pak, Cha (KOR)

26 September 2026; 14:00	South Korea	32–26	China	Kasugai City Gymnasium; Referees: Ismoilov, Ismoilov (UZB)
26 September 2026; 14:00	Kim R., Park S. 6	(16–12)	Li 7	Kasugai City Gymnasium; Referees: Ismoilov, Ismoilov (UZB)
26 September 2026; 14:00	3× (suspension)	Report	1× (suspension)	Kasugai City Gymnasium; Referees: Ismoilov, Ismoilov (UZB)

26 September 2026; 16:00	Qatar	31–25	Iran	Kasugai City Gymnasium; Referees: Furukawa, Murata (JPN)
26 September 2026; 16:00	Guehis 7	(13–14)	Asari, Enayati 6	Kasugai City Gymnasium; Referees: Furukawa, Murata (JPN)
26 September 2026; 16:00	1× (yellow card) 4× (suspension)	Report	1× (yellow card) 4× (suspension) 1× (red card)	Kasugai City Gymnasium; Referees: Furukawa, Murata (JPN)

26 September 2026; 18:00	Bahrain	37–16	Hong Kong	Kasugai City Gymnasium; Referees: Gheisarian, Gheisarian (IRI)
26 September 2026; 18:00	Abdulkarim 8	(18–8)	Wong K. 3	Kasugai City Gymnasium; Referees: Gheisarian, Gheisarian (IRI)
26 September 2026; 18:00		Report	3× (suspension)	Kasugai City Gymnasium; Referees: Gheisarian, Gheisarian (IRI)

=== Semifinals ===
28 September 2026; 15:00	Japan	31–35	Bahrain	Toyoda Gosei Memorial Gymnasium; Referees: Ismoilov, Ismoilov (UZB)
28 September 2026; 15:00	Nakata 8	(16–16)	Naser 8	Toyoda Gosei Memorial Gymnasium; Referees: Ismoilov, Ismoilov (UZB)
28 September 2026; 15:00	3× (suspension)	Report	3× (suspension) 1× (red card)	Toyoda Gosei Memorial Gymnasium; Referees: Ismoilov, Ismoilov (UZB)

28 September 2026; 17:30	South Korea	30–32	Qatar	Toyoda Gosei Memorial Gymnasium; Referees: Gheisarian, Gheisarian (IRI)
28 September 2026; 17:30	Kim Jin-y. 7	(16–16)	Madadi 8	Toyoda Gosei Memorial Gymnasium; Referees: Gheisarian, Gheisarian (IRI)
28 September 2026; 17:30	1× (yellow card) 1× (suspension)	Report	1× (yellow card) 5× (suspension) 1× (red card)	Toyoda Gosei Memorial Gymnasium; Referees: Gheisarian, Gheisarian (IRI)

=== Bronze medal match ===
29 September 2026; 17:00	Japan	37–32	South Korea	Toyoda Gosei Memorial Gymnasium; Referees: Al-Wahibi, Al-Shahi (OMA)
29 September 2026; 17:00	Nakata 9	(17–12)	Kim Jin-y. 7	Toyoda Gosei Memorial Gymnasium; Referees: Al-Wahibi, Al-Shahi (OMA)
29 September 2026; 17:00	1× (yellow card) 4× (suspension)	Report	1× (yellow card) 1× (suspension)	Toyoda Gosei Memorial Gymnasium; Referees: Al-Wahibi, Al-Shahi (OMA)

=== Gold medal match ===
29 September 2026; 19:30	Bahrain	33–32	Qatar	Toyoda Gosei Memorial Gymnasium; Referees: Furukawa, Murata (JPN)
29 September 2026; 19:30	Jalal, Kadhem 7	(16–15)	Madadi 10	Toyoda Gosei Memorial Gymnasium; Referees: Furukawa, Murata (JPN)
29 September 2026; 19:30	6× (suspension)	Report	2× (suspension) 1× (red card)	Toyoda Gosei Memorial Gymnasium; Referees: Furukawa, Murata (JPN)
