= Nasreddine Megdich =

Qatari handball player (born 1991)

Personal information
- Nationality: Qatari
- Born: 29 August 1991 (age 35)
- Height: 1.78 m (5 ft 10 in)

Sport
- Sport: Handball
- Position: Right wing
- Current club: Al Rayyan
- Number: 10
National team
Years	Team	Apps	(Gls)
–	Qatar	16	(27)
Medal record
Representing Qatar
Men's handball
Asian Games
Silver medal – second place	2026 Aichi–Nagoya	Team

Nasreddine Megdich (born 29 August 1991) is a Qatari handball player for Al Rayyan and the Qatari national team.

He participated at the 2016 Summer Olympics in Rio de Janeiro, in the men's handball tournament.
