= Athletics at the 2026 Asian Games – Men's 10,000 metres =

Men's 10,000 metres at the 2026 Asian Games
- Venue: Mizuho Park Athletic Stadium, Nagoya
- Date: 25 September 2026
- Competitors: 13 from 12 nations
- Winning time: 28:27.51

Medalists
gold medal	Birhanu Balew	Bahrain
silver medal	Gulveer Singh	India
bronze medal	Albert Rop	Bahrain

The men's 10,000 metres competition at the 2026 Asian Games took place on 25 September 2026 at the Mizuho Park Athletic Stadium in Nagoya, Japan. Birhanu Balew of Bahrain won the gold medal, Gulveer Singh of India won the silver and Albert Rop of Bahrain won the bronze.

== Schedule ==
All times are Japan Standard Time (UTC+09:00)

Schedule
Date	Time	Event
25 September 2026	17:02	Final

== Records ==
Prior to this competition, the existing world, Asian and Games records were as follows.

World Record	Joshua Cheptegei (UGA)	26:11.00	Valencia, Spain	9 July 2020
Asian Record	Ahmad Hassan Abdullah (QAT)	26:38.76	Brussels, Belgium	4 September 2003
Games Record	Bilisuma Shugi Gelassa (BRN)	27:32.72	Guangzhou, China	25 December 2010

== Results ==
Place	Athlete	Nation	Time	Notes
1st place, gold medalist(s)	Birhanu Balew	Bahrain	28:27.51	
2nd place, silver medalist(s)	Gulveer Singh	India	28:29.38	
3rd place, bronze medalist(s)	Albert Rop	Bahrain	28:34.38	
4	Wang Wenjie	China	28:38.14	
5	Yamato Yoshii	Japan	29:06.64	
6	Maxim Frolowskij	Kazakhstan	30:22.06	
7	Jaewoo Park	South Korea	30:32.62	
8	Gansukh Bat-Erdene	Mongolia	30:55.43	
9	Terrence Lai	Cambodia	32:12.14	
10	Sangay	Bhutan	32:56.18	
11	Javaa Myagmarsuren	Mongolia	33:29.61	
—	Ahmed Wridat	Palestine	DNF	
—	Rajan Rokaya	Nepal	DNF	
