= Tatsuki Yoshino =

Japanese handball player (born 1994)

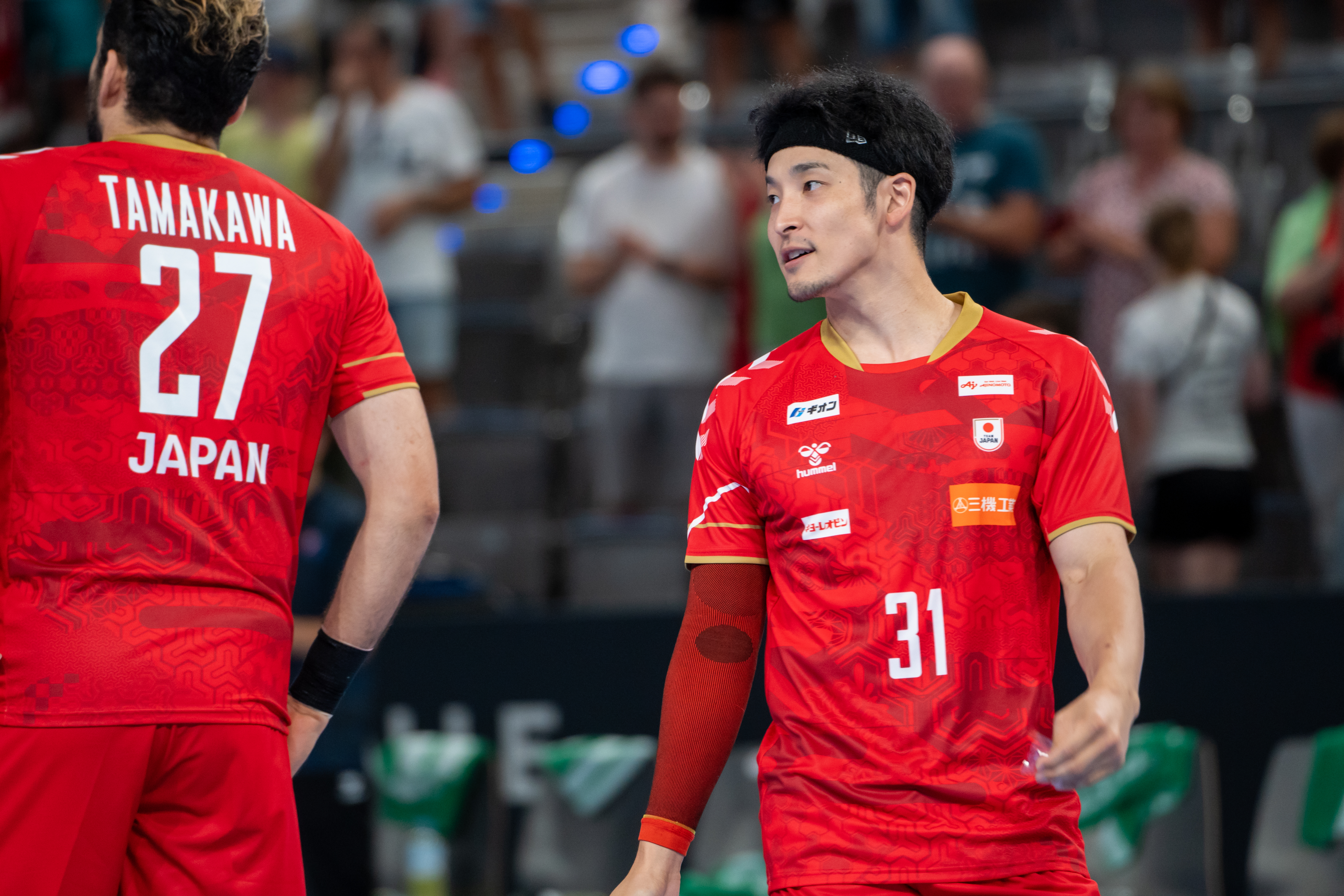

Personal information
- Nationality: Japanese
- Born: 13 July 1994 (age 32)
- Height: 1.82 m (6 ft 0 in)

Sport
- Sport: Handball
- Position: Left back
- Current club: Toyota Auto Body
National team
Years	Team	Apps	(Gls)
–	Japan	19	(52)
Medal record
Men's handball
Representing Japan
Asian Games
Bronze medal – third place	2026 Aichi–Nagoya	Team
Asian Championship
Bronze medal – third place	2020 Kuwait

Tatsuki Yoshino (Japanese: 吉野樹 born 13 July 1994) is a Japanese handball player for Toyota Auto Body and the Japanese national team.

He represented Japan at the 2019 World Men's Handball Championship.
