= Naoki Sugioka =

Japanese handball player (born 1994)

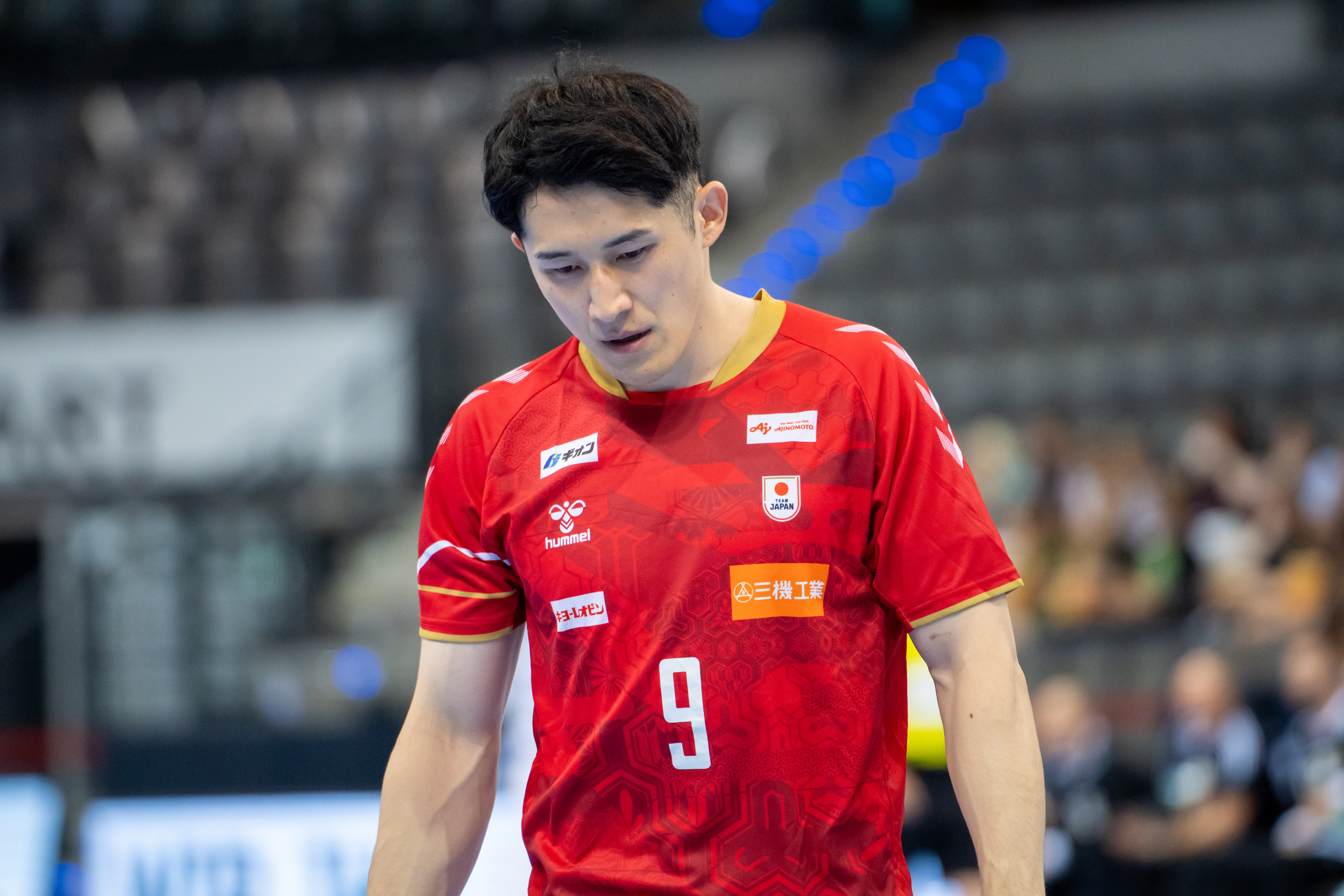

Personal information
- Nationality: Japanese
- Born: 18 April 1994 (age 32)
- Height: 1.78 m (5 ft 10 in)

Sport
- Sport: Handball
- Position: Left wing
- Current club: Toyota Auto Body
National team
Years	Team	Apps	(Gls)
2019–	Japan	5	(1)
Medal record
Men's handball
Representing Japan
Asian Games
Bronze medal – third place	2026 Aichi–Nagoya	Team
Asian Championship
Silver medal – second place	2024 Bahrain
Bronze medal – third place	2020 Kuwait

Naoki Sugioka (born 18 April 1994) is a Japanese handball player for Toyota Auto Body and the Japanese national team.

He represented Japan at the 2019 World Men's Handball Championship.
