= Mixed martial arts at the 2026 Asian Games – Women's modern 54 kg =

Women's modern 54 kg at the 2026 Asian Games
- Venue: Nagoya City Inae Sports Center
- Dates: 20–22 September 2026
- Competitors: 9 from 9 nations

Medalists
gold medal	Kanjutha Phattaraboonsorn	Thailand
silver medal	Diana Pogosian	Bahrain
bronze medal	Lee Bo-mi	South Korea
bronze medal	Vallensia Fahira Hotmauli	Indonesia

The women's MMA modern 54 kilograms competition at the 2026 Asian Games in Nagoya, Japan was held from 20 to 22 September 2026 at the Nagoya City Inae Sports Center.

Competition bouts consist of 2 rounds in total, each lasting 3 minutes in Preliminary matches or 5 minutes in Finals with a one-minute rest period between rounds. Grabbing and holding the competition clothing and shorts is illegal.

== Schedule ==
All times are Japan Standard Time (UTC+09:00)

Date	Time	Event
Sunday, 20 September 2026	10:10	Preliminary Round
Sunday, 20 September 2026	11:10	Quarterfinals
Monday, 21 September 2026	11:20	Semifinals
Tuesday, 22 September 2026	14:17	Final

== Results ==
Preliminary round
Lê Thị Phung (VIE)	3
Aigerim Torekhanova (KAZ)	0

Quarterfinals
Lee Bo-mi (KOR)	2
Lê Thị Phung (VIE)	1
Tomoe Katayama (JPN)	0
Diana Pogosian (BRN)	3
Vallensia Fahira Hotmauli (INA)	2
Adelina Murzagalieva (KGZ)	0
Gina Araos (PHI)	0
Kanjutha Phattaraboonsorn (THA)	3

Semifinals
Lee Bo-mi (KOR)	0
Diana Pogosian (BRN)	3
Vallensia Fahira Hotmauli (INA)	0
Kanjutha Phattaraboonsorn (THA)	3

Final
Diana Pogosian (BRN)	0
Kanjutha Phattaraboonsorn (THA)	3

== External Link ==
- Results
