= Sadiq Al-Mohsin =

Saudi Arabian handball player

Personal information
- Nationality: Saudi Arabian
- Born: 23 October 1997 (age 28)
- Height: 1.80 m (5 ft 11 in)

Sport
- Sport: Handball
- Position: Centre back
- Current club: Khaleej Club
- Number: 1
National team
Years	Team	Apps	(Gls)
–	Saudi Arabia	26	(33)
- Updated on 12 January 2023

Sadiq Al-Mohsin (Arabic: صادق المحسن; born 23 October 1997) is a Saudi Arabian handball player for Khaleej Club and the Saudi Arabian national team.

He participated at the 2017 and 2023 World Men's Handball Championship.
