= Zhang Tingting =

Chinese handball player (born 1996)

Personal information
- Nationality: Chinese
- Born: 3 September 1996 (age 30)
- Height: 1.83 m (6 ft 0 in)

Sport
- Sport: Handball
- Position: Right wing
- Current club: Anhui
National team
Years	Team	Apps	(Gls)
–	China	20	(7)
Medal record
Asian Championship
Bronze medal – third place	2018 Japan
Bronze medal – third place	2022 South Korea

Zhang Tingting (born 3 September 1996) is a Chinese handball player for Anhui and the Chinese national team.

She participated at the 2017 World Women's Handball Championship.
