= Hasan Merza =

Bahraini handball player

Personal information
- Full name: Hasan Merza Ali
- Nationality: Bahraini
- Born: 18 June 1998 (age 28)
- Height: 1.79 m (5 ft 10 in)

Sport
- Sport: Handball
- Position: Right Back
- Current club: Al-Najma
- Number: 88
National team
Years	Team	Apps	(Gls)
–	Bahrain	41	(40)
Medal record
Men's handball
Representing Bahrain
Asian Games
Gold medal – first place	2026 Aichi–Nagoya	Team
Silver medal – second place	2022 Hangzhou	Team
Asian Championship
Silver medal – second place	2022 Saudi Arabia	Team
Bronze medal – third place	2024 Bahrain	Team
Islamic Solidarity Games
Gold medal – first place	2025 Riyadh	Team

Hasan Merza Ali (Arabic: حسن ميرزا علي. born 18 June 1998), is a Bahraini handball player for Al-Najma and the Bahraini national team. He competed in the 2020 Summer Olympics.
