= Birhanu Balew =

Bahraini long-distance runner (born 1996)

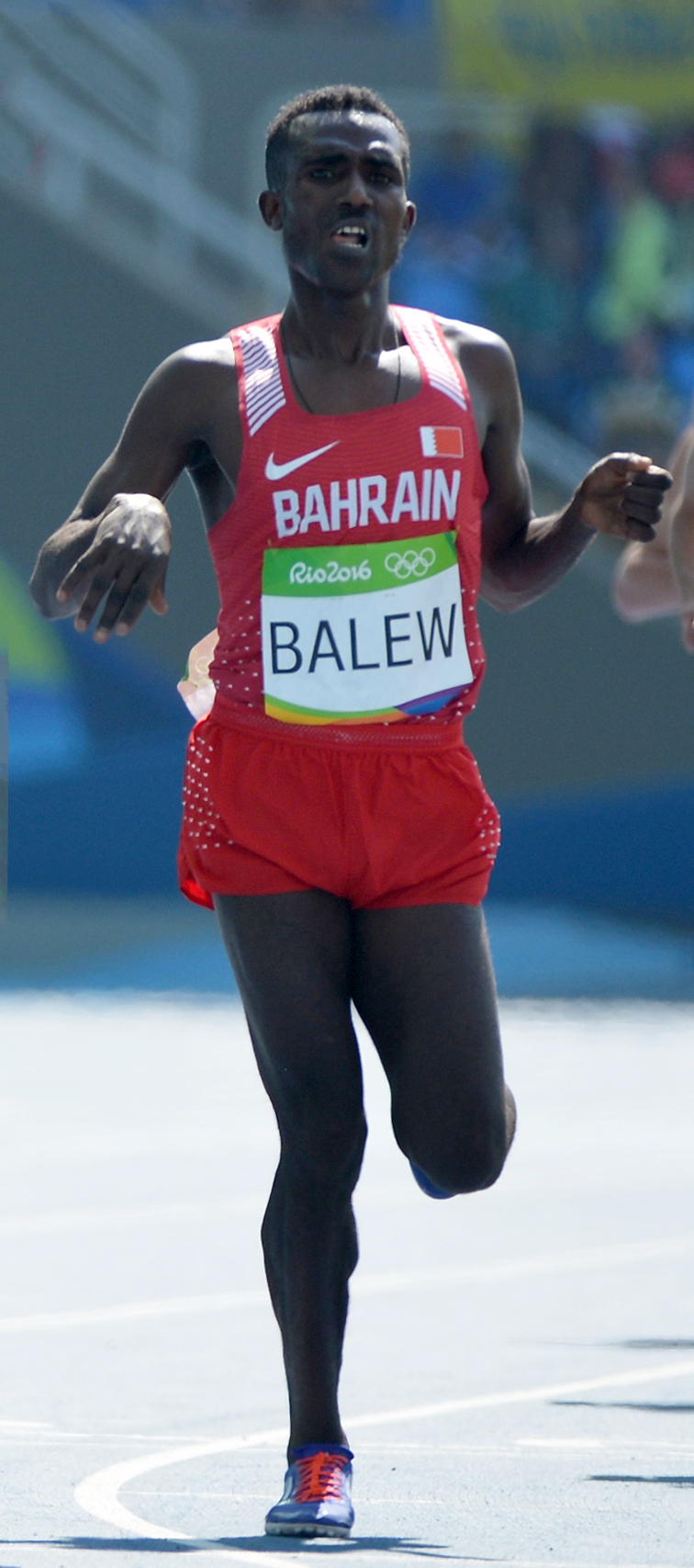
- Balew at the 2016 Olympics

Personal information
- Born: 27 February 1996 (age 30)

Sport
- Country: Bahrein
- Sport: Athletics
- Event: 5000 m 10000 m

Achievements and titles
- Olympic finals: 9th, 5000m (Rio 2016) 6th, 5000m (Tokyo 2020) 17th, 10000m (Paris 2024)
- Highest world ranking: 2th (2026)
- Personal best: 3000 m 7:29.60 (2026) 3000 m indoor 7:31.77 (2022) 5000 m 12:45.70 (2026) 5 km 13:02 (2021) 10 km 26:54 (2025) 10.000 m 27:07:49 (2021) Half-marathon 58:23 (2026)
Medal record
Men's athletics
Representing Bahrain
Asian Games
Gold medal – first place	2022 Hangzhou	5000 m
Gold medal – first place	2022 Hangzhou	10,000 m
Gold medal – first place	2026 Aichi-Nagoya	5000 m
Gold medal – first place	2026 Aichi-Nagoya	10,000 m
Asian Championships
Gold medal – first place	2019 Doha	5000 m
Arab Games
Gold medal – first place	2023 Bir El Djir	5000 m
Islamic Solidarity Games
Gold medal – first place	2021 Konya	5000 m
Gold medal – first place	2025 Riyadh	10,000 m
Arab Championships
Gold medal – first place	2019 Cairo	5000 m
Military Games
Gold medal – first place	2019 Wuhan	5000 m

Birhanu Balew (born 27 February 1996) is an Ethiopian-born long-distance runner representing Bahrain. He reached the final of the 5000 m event at the 2016 Summer Olympics.

== Athletics career ==
=== Early career ===
Birhanu started competing internationally in 2015.

In 2016 Birhanu competed in his first Olympic Games at the 2016 Rio de Janeiro Olympic Games. He placed 9th in the men's 5000m Final clocking a time of 13:09.26. The race was won by Great Britain's Mo Farah in 13:03.30.

=== 2017 ===
Birhanu's first race of 2017 came on 17 January at the Kuwait City Half Marathon, where he won in a personal best time of 1:01:45. On 26 March, Birhanu represented Bahrain at the 2017 World Cross Country Championships in Kampala, Uganda. In the Senior race Birhanu placed 27th. On 25 and 26 April Birhanu won both the 10000m and 5000m at the Doha EMIR Cup in 31:16.51 and 13:52.39 respectively. On 5 May Birhanu competed in his first Diamond League Meeting of the season running 7:52.98 to place 14th in Doha, Qatar. Birhanu then returned to the roads to race the Okpekpe Road Race 10 km in Nigeria, placing 10th in 31:15. Birhanu then won three 5000m races in a Europe before going to London to compete in the 2017 World Championships in Athletics. In London Birhanu qualified to the final of the 5000m, and finished 12th in a time of 13:43.25; the race was won by Ethiopia's Muktar Edris. Birhanu won two more 5000m before his final competition of the year at the Sao Paulo Corrida de Sao Silvestre 15 km in Sao Paulo, Brazil.

=== 2018 ===
In 2018 Birhanu represented his country at the 2018 World Indoor Championships in Birmingham, United Kingdom over 3000m. After qualifying to the final, Birhanu placed 10th in 8:18.89. Birhanu won a 5000m at the Shanghai Diamond League on 12 May in 13:09.64, and raced 2miles at the Prefontaine Classic in Eugene, Oregon, USA on 25 May, placing 3rd in 8:21.54. On 5 July Birhanu won the 5000m at the Lausanne Diamond League Meeting. Running in third place into the final 200m, race leader Yomif Kejelcha fell and grabbed Selemon Barega's shorts, pulling him out of the inside lane, while Birhanu ran by to win in a time of 13:01.09. On 30 August Birhanu represented his country at the 2018 Asian Games in Jakarta, Indonesia. Birhanu won the 5000m in a time of 13:43.17.

=== 2019–20 ===
Birhanu started his 2019 track season running indoors in France. On 2 February he won the 3000m at the Meeting National, Mondeville, and on 10 February he won the 2000m at the Meeting Hauts-de-France Pas-de-Calais. On 30 March Birhanu represented his country at the 2019 World Cross Country Championships in Aarhus, Denmark. Birhanu finished 19th in the senior men's race, which was won by Uganda's Joshua Cheptegei. Birhanu then won both the Arab Championships in Cairo, Egypt and the Asian Championships in Doha, Qatar over the 5000m. On 18 May Birhanu finished 4th at the Shanghai Diamond League 5000m running a time of 13:05.04. On 6 June Birhanu finished 4th at the Golden Gala-Pietro Minnea in Rome, clocking a personal best of 12:56.26; his first sub-13 minute 5000m clocking. Birhanu contested several Diamond League Meetings over the summer before his next global championships at the 2019 World Championships in Athletics in Doha, Qatar. On 30 September after qualifying for the final Birhanu placed 9th in 13:14.66; the race was won by Ethiopia's Muktar Edris. On 26 October Birhanu won the 5000m at the CISM Military World Games in Wuhan, China in a time of 14:08.99.

Birhanu only had a short 2020 track season racing indoors between 31 January and 21 February.

=== 2021–present ===
Birhanu began his 2021 track season by competing indoor over 3000m at the Meeting Hauts-de-France Pas-de-Calais; he finished 5th in an Asian Record of 7:34.58. On 19 May Birhanu raced 10000m at the 60th Ostrava Golden Spike in Ostrava, Czech Republic. Birhanu finished 2nd in 27:07.49, and new personal best and national record. Uganda's Jacob Kiplimo won the race in 26:33.93 Birhanu's race in Ostrava qualified him for the 10000m at the 2020 Tokyo Olympic Games; he had already qualified for the 5000m. Birhanu's next race was at the Golden Gala-Pietra Minnea in Florence, Italy. Birhanu placed 7th in 12:57.71; the race was won by Norway's Jakob Ingebrigtsen. Birhanu next raced at the Bislett Games in Oslo, Norway in the 3000m placing 4th in a personal best time of 7:33.05.

At the 2024 Summer Olympics in Paris, Birhanu represented Bahrain in the 5000m and 10,000 metre competitions, but did not advance from the heat stage in the 5000m. Birhanu finished 17th in the 10,000m.
