= Ahmed Al-Derazi =

Bahraini basketball player (born 1990)

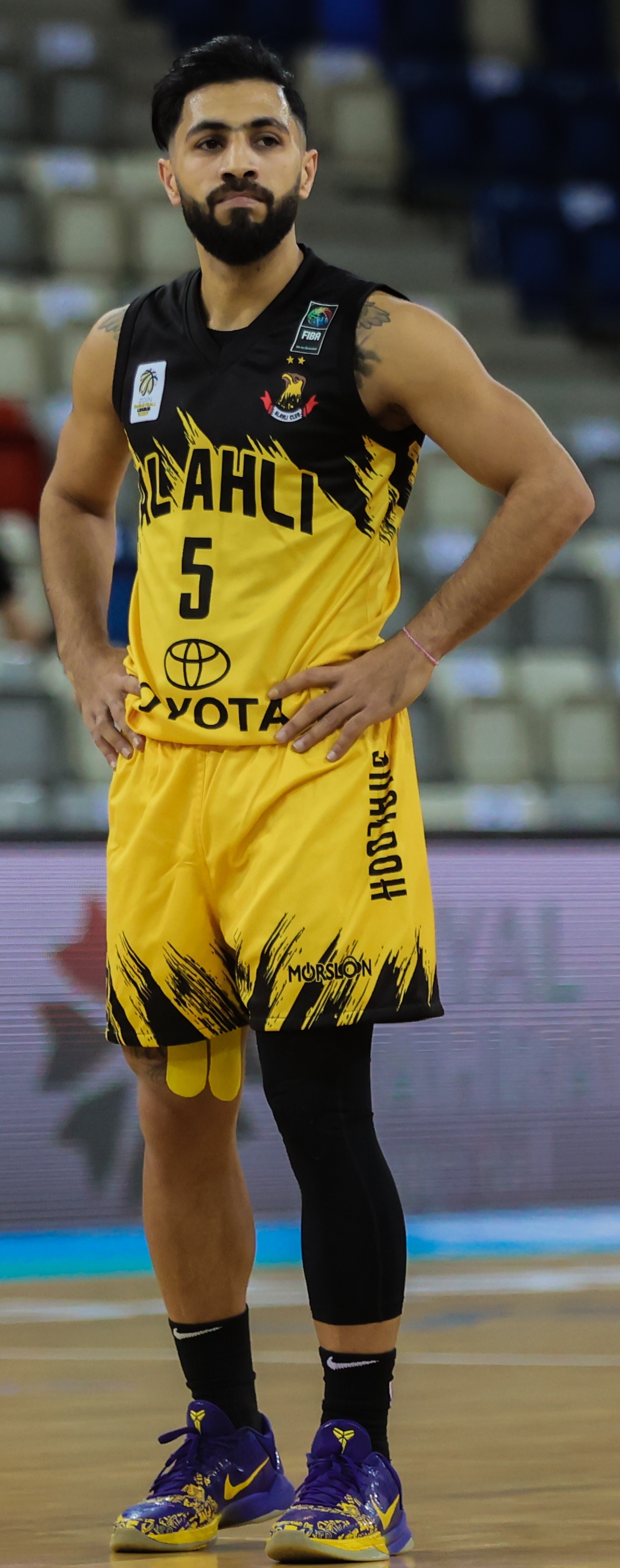

No. 5 – Al-Ahli Club
- Position: PG
- League: Bahraini Premier League

Personal information
- Born: October 9, 1990 (age 36) Manama, Bahrain
- Listed height: 1.72 m (5 ft 8 in)
- Listed weight: 69 kg (152 lb)

Career information
- Playing career: 2008–present

Career history
- 2008–2020: Al-Muharraq
- 2020–2022: Al-Ahli Club
- 2022–2023: Manama Club
- 2024–present: Al-Ahli Club

Career highlights
- Zain Cup Championship: 1st Golden Medal (2011,2013,2014,2021); Super Cup Championship: MVP/1st Golden Medal (2013,2020,2021,2022); Zain League Championship: MVP + 1st Golden Medal (2013,2019); Zain League Championship: Bronze Medal (2022); Khalifa Bin Salman Cup Championship: Final MVP/Top scorer/1st Golden Medal (2018,2021); GCC Basketball Clubs Championship: Bronze Medal (2013,2021); Friendship & Peace Championship Al Qadisya Club Kuwait: MVP (2013); GCC National Teams Championship: Silver Medal (2013); Arab Nationals Teams Championship: Bronze Medal (2017)

Ahmed Hassan Al-Derazi (Arabic: أحمد حسن الدرازي) (born October 9, 1990) is a Bahraini professional basketball player for Al-Ahli Club, and a former player for the Bahrain national team. He previously played for Muharraq Club of the Bahraini Premier League.

== Early life ==
He practiced basketball from a young age. His club sports career started at the age of nine, when he joined the junior age groups at Muharraq Club and he progressed until he eventually reached the men’s category. He later won championships at Muharraq Club and also Al-Ahly club.

== Awards ==
=== Local ===
==== 2010–2011 ====
- Muharraq Club
  - Zain Cup Championship: 1st Golden Medal.

==== 2012–2013 ====
- Muharraq Club
1. Super Cup Championship: MVP + 1st Golden Medal.
2. Zain Cup Championship: 1st Golden Medal.
3. Zain League Championship: MVP + 1st Golden Medal.

==== 2014–2015 ====
- Muharraq Club
  - Zain Cup Championship: 1st Golden Medal.

==== 2017–2018 ====
- Muharraq Club
  - Khalifa Bin Salman Cup Championship: Final MVP + Top scorer + 1st Golden Medal.

==== 2018–2019 ====
- Muharraq Club
  - Zain League Championship: Guard of the year + Final MVP + 1st Golden Medal.

==== 2019–2020 ====
- Muharraq Club
  - Super Cup Championship: 1st Golden Medal.

==== 2020–2021 ====
- Al-Ahly club
1. Super Cup Championship: 1st Golden Medal.
2. Zain Cup Championship: 1st Golden Medal.
3. Khalifa Bin Salman Cup Championship: 1st Golden Medal.

==== 2021–2022 ====
- Al-Ahly club
1. Super Cup Championship: 1st Golden Medal.
2. Zain League Championship: Bronze Medal.

=== International ===
==== 2013 ====
- Muharraq Club
1. GCC Basketball Clubs Championship: Bronze Medal.
2. Friendship & Peace Championship Al Qadisya Club Kuwait: MVP.

- Bahrain national team
  - GCC National Teams Championship: Silver Medal.

==== 2017 ====
- Bahrain national team
  - Arab Nationals Teams Championship – Egypt: Bronze Medal.

==== 2021 ====
- Al-Ahly club
  - GCC Basketball Clubs Championship: Bronze Medal.

== Career statistics ==
Legend
| GP | Games played | FG | Field goal & average | PTS | Points Scored & average |
| 2P% | 2-point field goal percentage | 3P% | 3-point field goal percentage | FT% | Free throw percentage |
| REB | Rebounds & average | AST | Assists & average | STL | Steals & average |
| TO | Turnover & average |

Leagues statistics
| Year | Team | League | GP | PTS/AVG | | FG/AVG | | 2PT - % | | 3PT - % | | FT - % | | AST/AVG | | STL/AVG | | REB/AVG | | TO/AVG | |
|---|---|---|---|---|---|---|---|---|---|---|---|---|---|---|---|---|---|---|---|---|---|
| 2016–2017 | Muharraq Club | Bahraini Premier League | 20 | 360 | 18 | 106 | 5.3 | 57/140 | 41% | 49/144 | 34% | 99/116 | 85% | 95 | 4.8 | 15 | 0.8 | 73 | 3.7 | 58 | 2.9 |
| 2017–2018 | Muharraq Club | Bahraini Premier League | 20 | 358 | 17.9 | 119 | 6.0 | 72/145 | 50% | 47/134 | 35% | 73/95 | 77% | 106 | 5.3 | 26 | 1.3 | 73 | 3.7 | 48 | 2.4 |
| 2018–2019 | Muharraq Club | Bahraini Premier League | 23 | 405 | 17.6 | 122 | 5.3 | 63/127 | 50% | 59/157 | 38% | 102/117 | 87% | 119 | 5.2 | 22 | 1.0 | 90 | 3.9 | 62 | 2.7 |
| 2019–2020 | Muharraq Club | Bahraini Premier League | 18 | 253 | 13.3 | 79 | 4.2 | 39/77 | 51% | 40/108 | 37% | 55/69 | 80% | 85 | 4.5 | 17 | 0.9 | 60 | 3.2 | 42 | 2.2 |
| 2020–2021 | Al-Ahly club | Bahraini Premier League | 14 | 200 | 14.3 | 62 | 4.4 | 30/60 | 50% | 32/40 | 36% | 44/53 | 83% | 59 | 4.2 | 6 | 0.4 | 57 | 4.1 | 23 | 1.6 |
| 2021–2022 | Al-Ahly club | Bahraini Premier League | 19 | 267 | 14.1 | 88 | 4.6 | 29/64 | 45% | 59/123 | 48% | 32/33 | 97% | 84 | 4.4 | 7 | 0.4 | 58 | 3.1 | 29 | 1.5 |

Cups statistics
| Year | Team | League | GP | PTS/AVG | | FG/AVG | | 2PT - % | | 3PT - % | | FT - % | | AST/AVG | | STL/AVG | | REP/AVG | | TO/AVG | |
|---|---|---|---|---|---|---|---|---|---|---|---|---|---|---|---|---|---|---|---|---|---|
| 2016–2017 | Muharraq Club | Khalifa Bin Salman Cup | 4 | 75 | 18.8 | 25 | 6.3 | 15/21 | 71% | 10/31 | 32% | 15/16 | 94% | 16 | 4.0 | 0 | 0 | 17 | 4.3 | 13 | 3.3 |
| 2018–2019 | Muharraq Club | Khalifa Bin Salman Cup | 4 | 36 | 9.0 | 13 | 3.3 | 7/16 | 44% | 6/24 | 25% | 4/6 | 67% | 22 | 5.5 | 6 | 15 | 7 | 1.8 | 7 | 1.8 |
| 2019–2020 | Muharraq Club | Khalifa Bin Salman Cup | 3 | 32 | 10.7 | 7 | 2.3 | 3/10 | 30% | 4/12 | 33% | 14/18 | 78% | 9 | 3.0 | 2 | 0.7 | 7 | 2.3 | 3 | 1.0 |
| 2020–2021 | Al-Ahly club | Khalifa Bin Salman Cup | 4 | 64 | 16.0 | 21 | 5.3 | 6/12 | 50% | 15/25 | 60% | 7/8 | 88% | 15 | 3.8 | 2 | 0.5 | 19 | 4.8 | 9 | 2.3 |
