= Amin Yousefinezhad =

Iranian handball player (born 1996)

Personal information
- Nationality: Iranian
- Born: January 11, 1996 (age 30) Nowshahr, Iran
- Height: 1.96 m (6 ft 5 in)

Sport
- Sport: Handball
- Position: Left back
- Current club: AHC Dunărea Călărași
- Number: 24

Senior clubs
- Years: Team
- –2017: (Iran) Shahrdari Tabriz HC
- 2017: (North Macedonia) RK Metalurg Skopje
- 2017–: (Tunisia) Espérance Sportive de Tunis
- 2020–: (Romania) AHC Dunărea Călărași
National team
- Years: Team
- –: Iran

Amin Yousefinezhad (born 11 January 1996) is an Iranian handball player who plays for Espérance Sportive de Tunis and the Iran national handball team.
