= Hasan Madan =

Bahraini handball player

Personal information
- Nationality: Bahraini
- Born: 29 February 1996 (age 30)
- Height: 1.94 m (6 ft 4 in)

Sport
- Sport: Handball
- Position: Pivot
- Current club: Al-Ahli
- Number: 33
National team
Years	Team	Apps	(Gls)
–	Bahrain	37	(94)
Medal record
Men's handball
Representing Bahrain
Asian Games
Gold medal – first place	2026 Aichi–Nagoya	Team
Silver medal – second place	2018 Jakarta	Team
Silver medal – second place	2022 Hangzhou	Team
Asian Championship
Gold medal – first place	2026 Kuwait
Bronze medal – third place	2024 Bahrain

Hasan Madan (born 29 February 1996) is a Bahraini handball player for Al-Ahli and the Bahraini national team.

He represented Bahrain at the 2019 World Men's Handball Championship.
