= Nanjing Tech University =

Provincial public university in Nanjing, Jiangsu, China

Coordinates: 32°04′43.36″N 118°46′19.07″E

- Former names: Nanjing University of Technology
- Motto: 明德 厚学 沉毅 笃行
- Type: Public university
- Established: 2001
- President: JIANG, Juncheng (蒋军成)
- Academic staff: 2,800
- Undergraduates: 22,000
- Postgraduates: 4,500
- Location: Nanjing, Jiangsu, China
- Campus: Suburban
- Colors: NJTech Blue; NJTech White
- Website: www.njtech.edu.cn

Nanjing Tech University (南京工业大学), previously known as the Nanjing University of Technology, is a provincial public technological university in Nanjing, Jiangsu, China. It is affiliated with the Province of Jiangsu. The school was established in 2001 by the merger of the former Nanjing Chemical Engineering University (南京化工大学) and the former Nanjing Architectural Engineering College (南京建筑工程学院).

== Schools and colleges ==
- College of Safety Science and Engineering
- School of Environmental Science and Engineering
- College of Materials Science and Engineering
- College of Chemical Engineering
- School of Chemistry and Molecular Engineering
- College of Electrical Engineering and Control Science
- School of Mechanical and Power Engineering
- School of Energy Science and Engineering
- School of Pharmaceutical Sciences
- College of Architecture
- College of Art and Design
- School of Economics and Management
- School of Law
- School of Marxism
- School of Foreign Languages and Literature
- School of Physical Education
- College of Biotechnology and Pharmaceutical Engineering
- College of Food Science and Light Industry
- School of Computer Science and Technology
- School of Physical and Mathematical Sciences
- School of Geometrics Science and Technology
- College of Urban Construction
- College of Transportation Engineering
- College of Civil Engineering
- School of 2011
- College of Overseas Education
- Institute of Advanced Materials
