= Imperial Crown Style =

Japanese architectural style

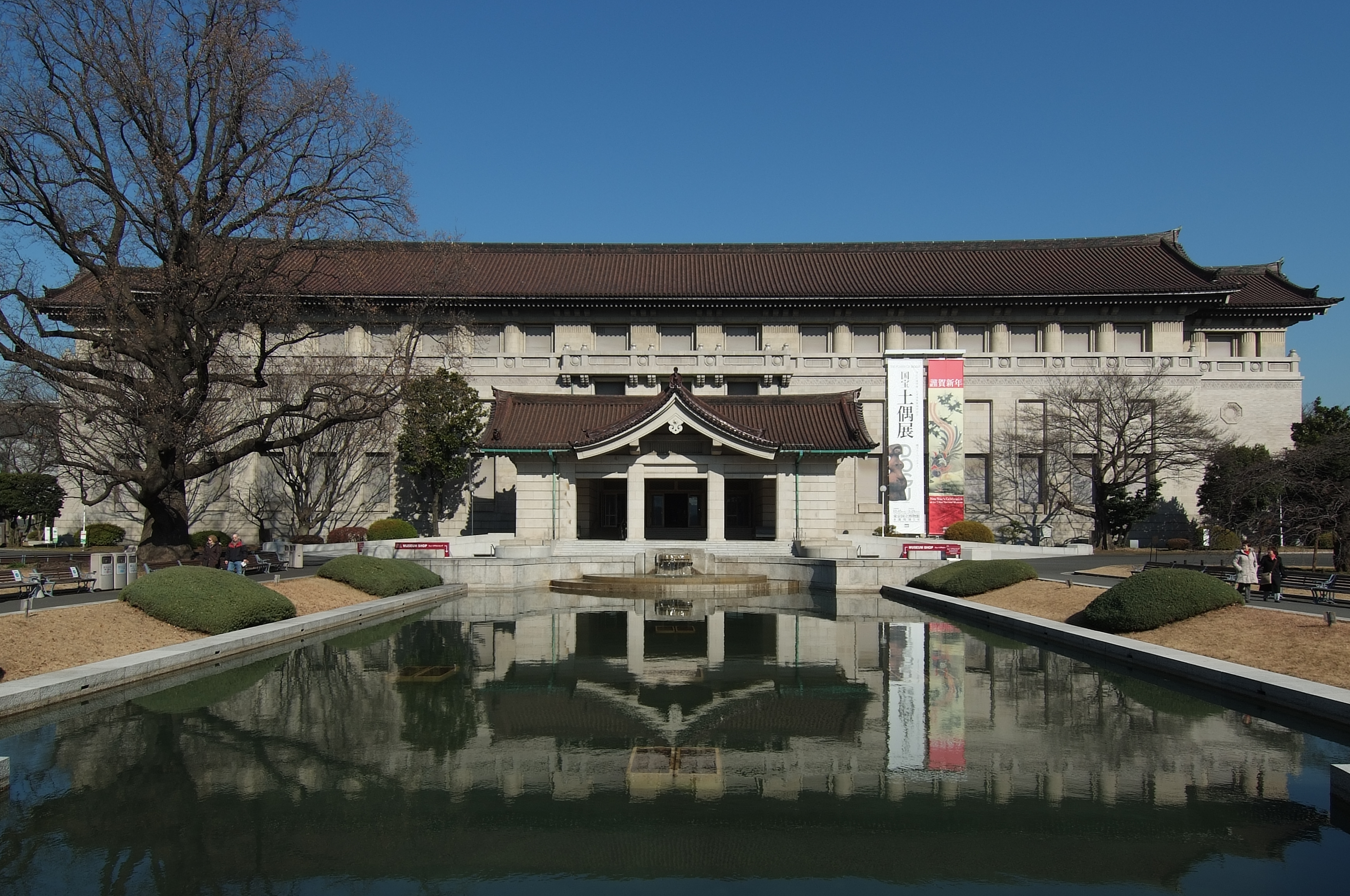
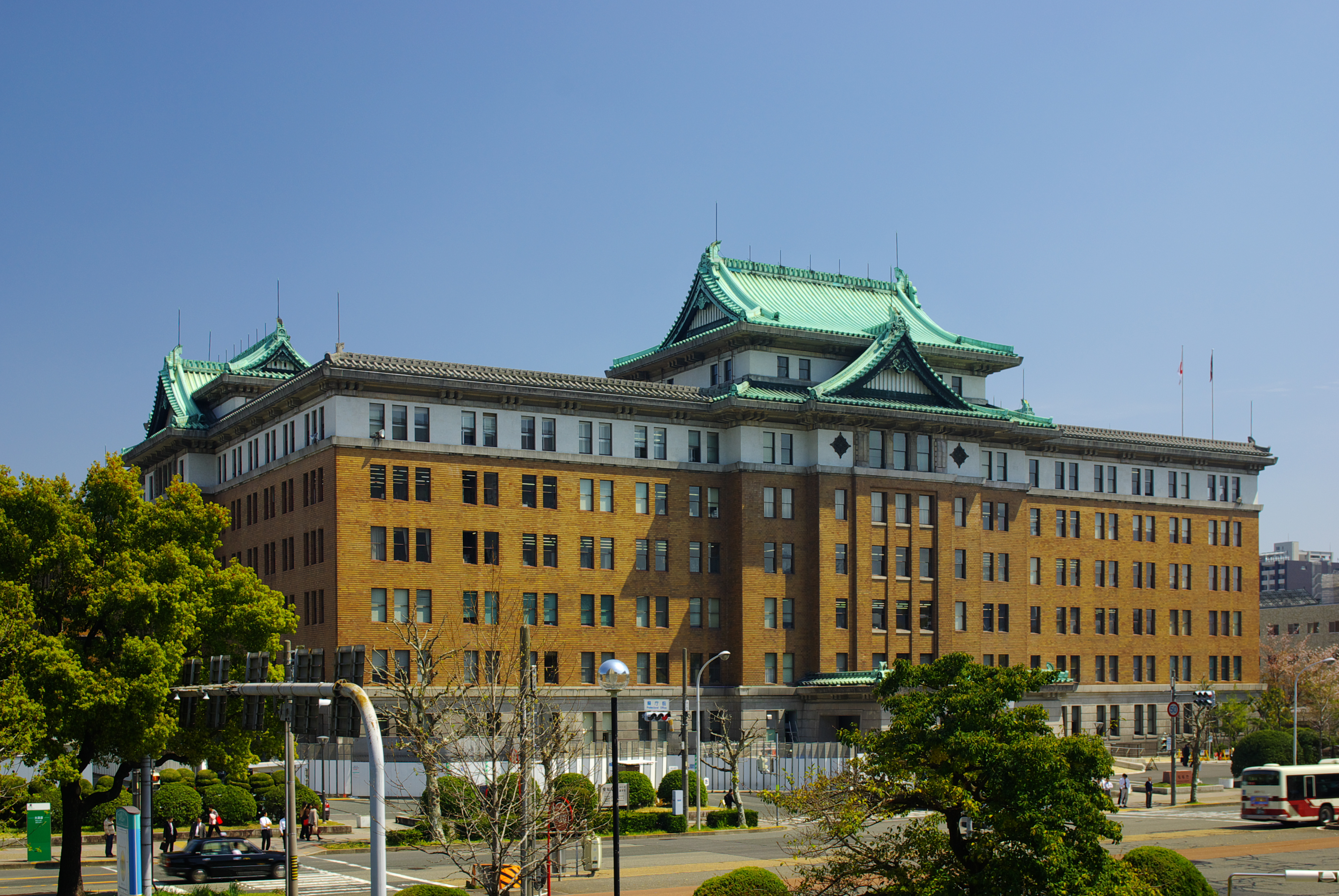
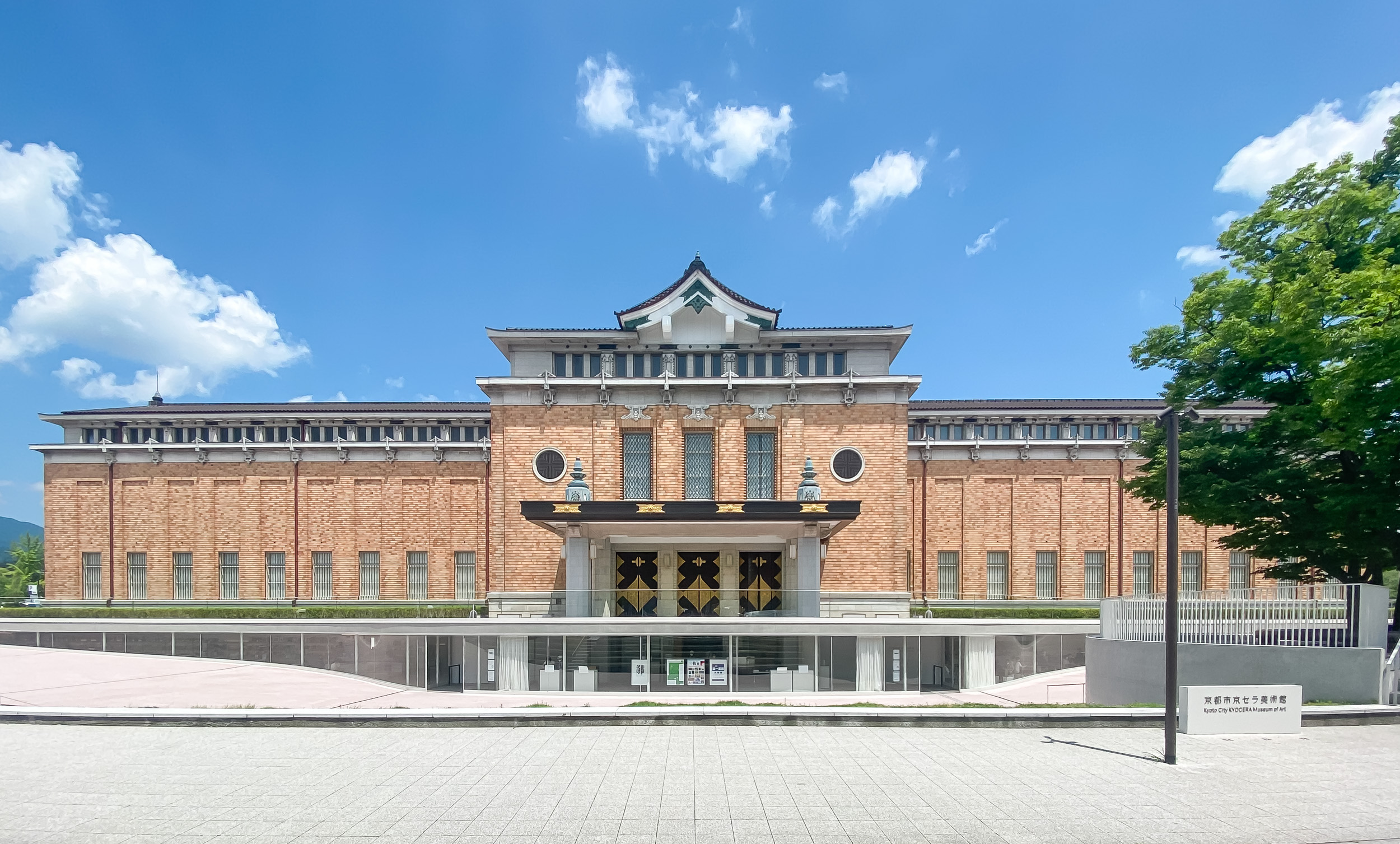
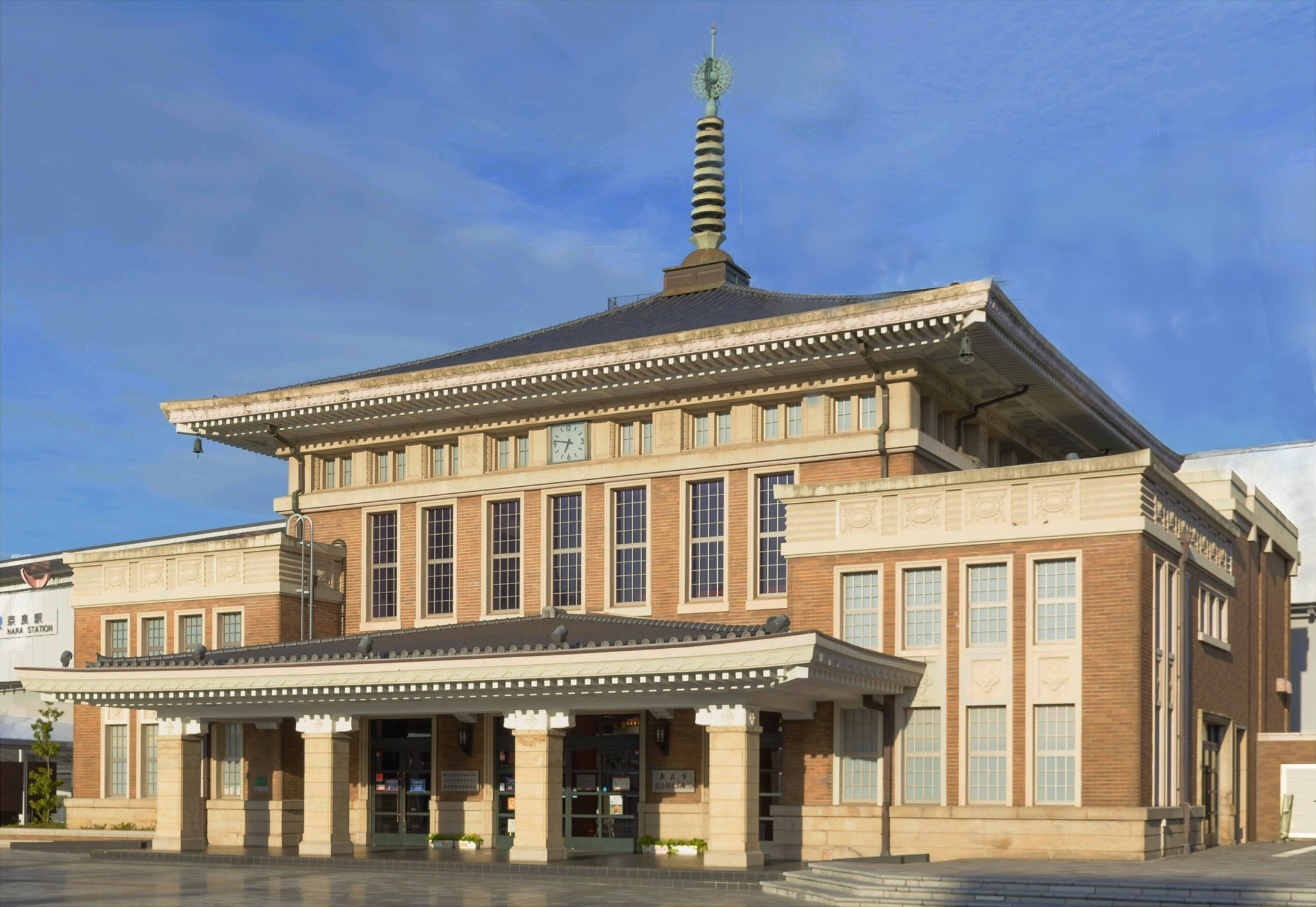
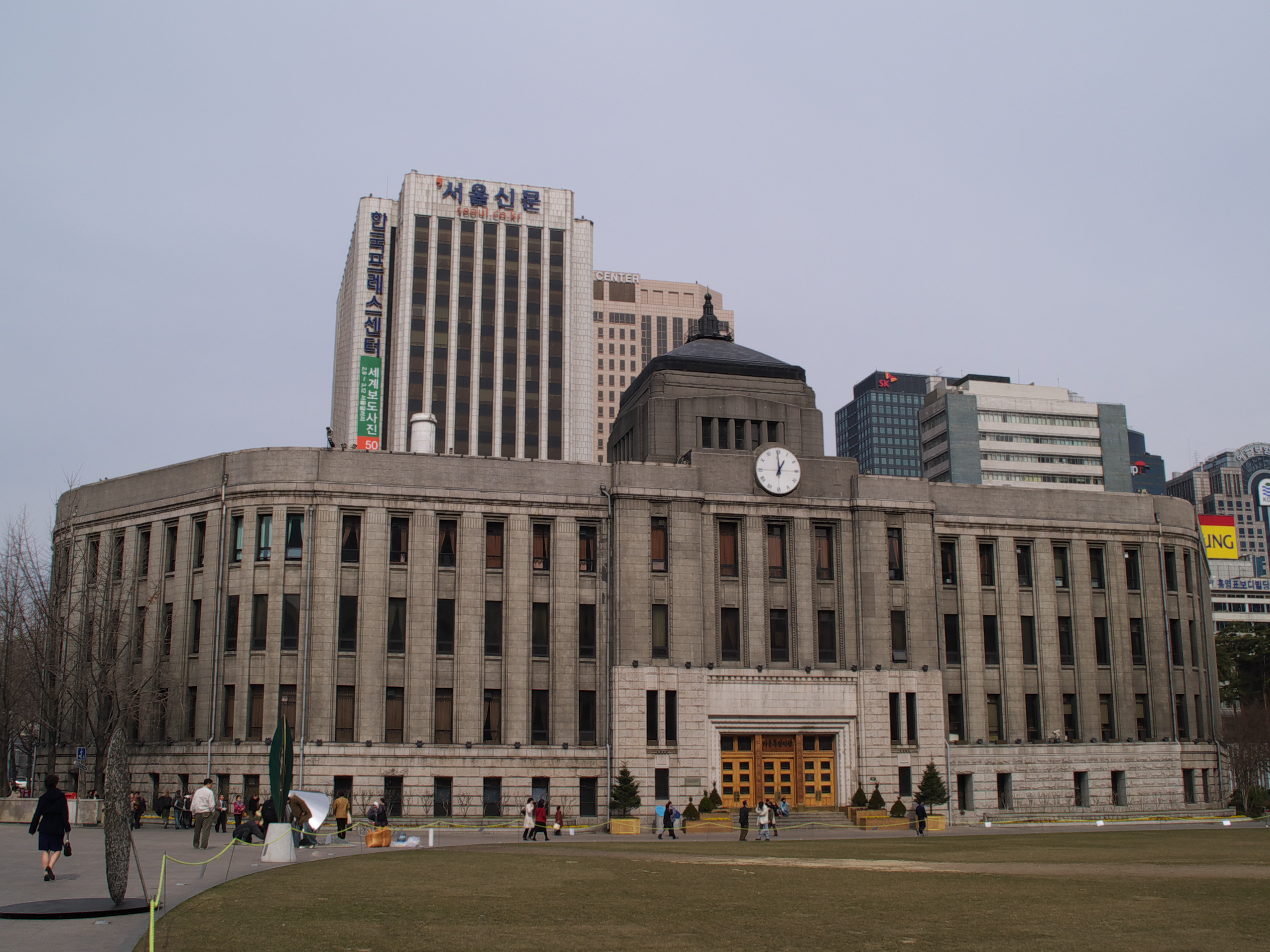
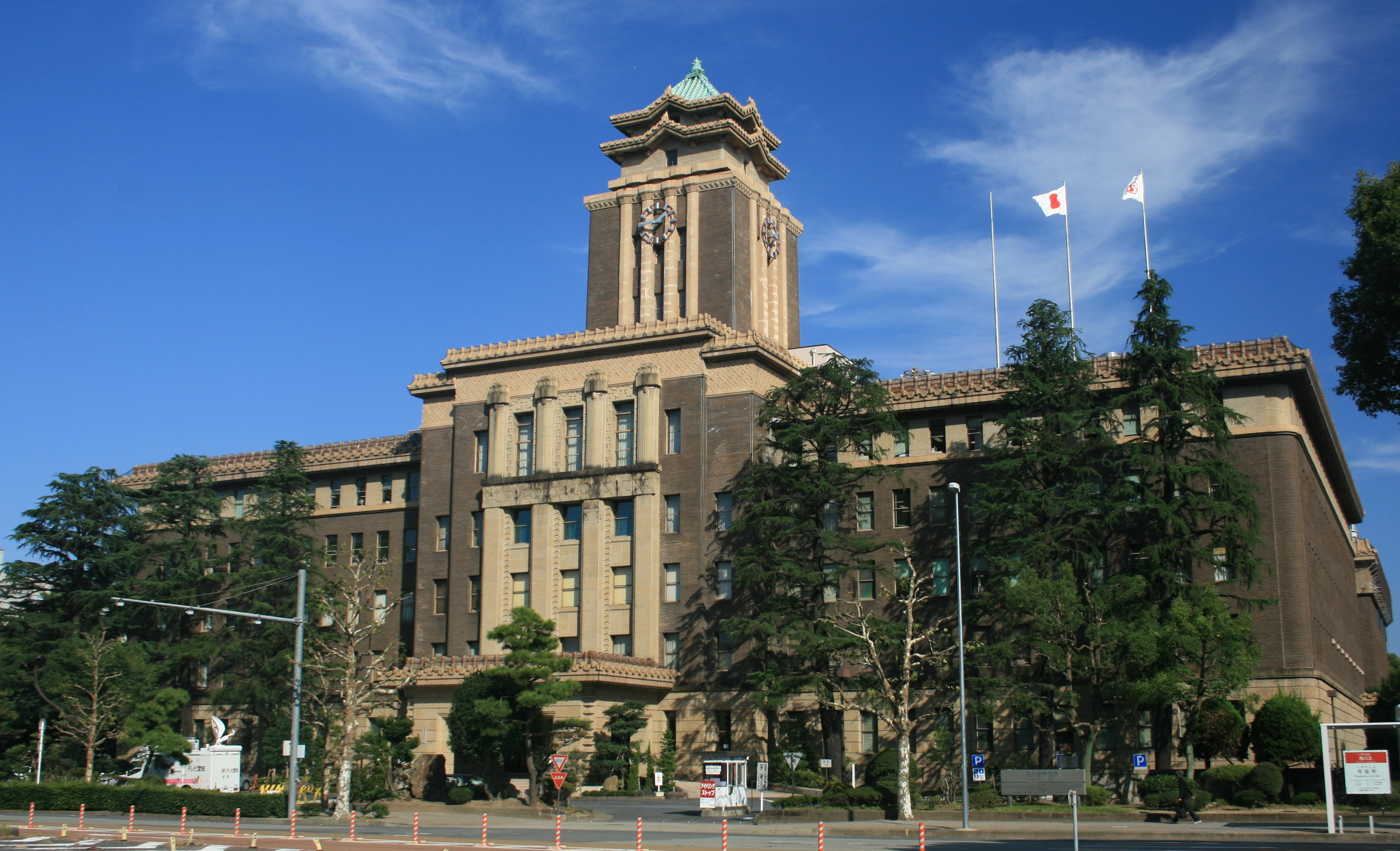
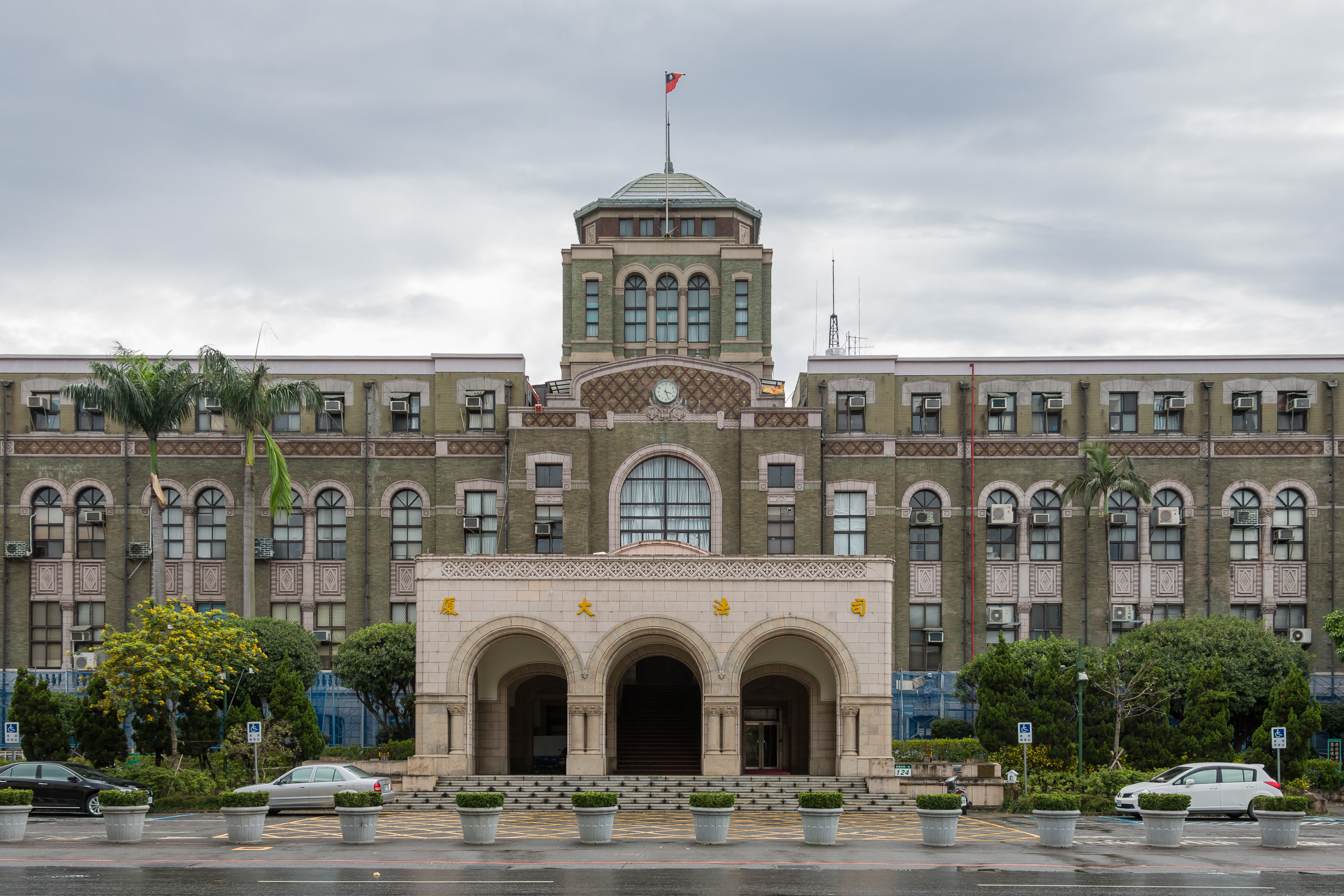
- Tokyo National Museum Aichi Prefectural Office Kyoto Municipal Museum of Art Nara Station Seoul City Hall Nagoya City Hall Judicial Building, Taipei
- Years active: 1919–1945
- Location: Asia Pacific
- Major figures: Kikutarō Shimoda, Chūta Itō, Toshikata Sanō, Takeda Gōichi
- Influences: Japonesque, artistic eclecticism, neoclassical architecture
- Influenced: Early Modern Japanese architecture

The Imperial Crown Style (帝冠様式, teikan yōshiki) of Japanese architecture developed during the Japanese Empire in the early twentieth century. The style is identified by Japanese-style roofing on top of Neoclassical styled buildings; and can have a centrally elevated structure with a pyramidal hip roof. Outside of the Japanese mainland, Imperial Crown Style architecture often included regional architectural elements. Before the end of World War II, the style was originally referred to as Emperor's Crown Amalgamate Style, and sometimes Emperor's Crown Style (帝冠式, Teikanshiki). In some cases, it is called Xingya (興亞式) in Chinese, or Koua (興亜様式) in Japanese.

Starting in Japan in the 1930s, this Western and Japanese eclectic architectural style was promoted by Itō Chūta, Sano Toshikata, and Takeda Goichi. Itō, Sano, and Takeda had been appointed as judges for architectural design competitions, held a preferences for Japonesque aesthetics to be incorporated into the design guidelines, and chose designs where a Japanese styled roof was integrated into a Western style reinforced concrete building.

The prototype for the style was developed by architect Shimoda Kikutaro for the Imperial Diet Building (present National Diet Building) in 1920, and reached its peak in the 1930s until the end of World War II. The style ran contrary to modernism and placed an emphasis on including traditional Japanese architectural elements, in a distinct expression of Japanese Western Eclectic Architecture.

== History ==
During the 1920s and 1930s the last buildings with architectural designs drawing from artistic historicism were constructed. This was due to a decline in the strict adherence to the design rules that defined classic historicism in architecture, and gave way to an eclectic architectural style which included aspects of Frank Lloyd Wright, Modernism and Expressionist architecture. This was a compromise made to combine multiple styles into the classical or simplified classical architectural design in a single building.

In Japan, buildings which incorporated Japanese styled components were popularised in the late 1920s. Construction during this period included: buildings with architecture that was harmonised with an interior theme such as, Kabuki-za (1924) and the East-Oriental Tōkyo Research Institution (1933), architecture that was considerate of the surrounding area aesthetics such as, Shiba Ward Office (1929) and Women's Pavilion (1936), international tourist hotels that appealed to a sense of exoticism related to Western foreigners such as, Biwa-Ko Hotel (1934) and Gamagori Classic Hotel (1934), were built.

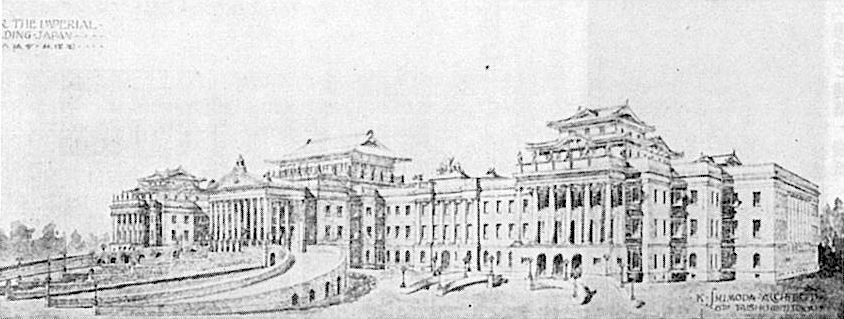
Drawing of Shimoda Kikutaro's design for the National Diet building, in the Imperial Crown amalgamate style (1919)

In 1919 an architectural design competition was held for the design of the Imperial Diet Building (present National Diet Building), with all the winning entries being renaissance designs. Shimoda Kikutaro raised objections to these designs, by moving two petitions through the Imperial Diet. Shimoda presented a design with a Japanese-styled roof set atop of the body of the building, naming this Emperor's Crown Amalgamate Style, and actively distributed pamphlets about this cause, but was rejected by the architectural industry.

From 1906 to 1922 both Frank Lloyd Wright and Shimoda Kikutaro, who had been active together in Chicago, submitted separate design proposals for the rebuilding of the Imperial Hotel, Tokyo. Shimoda had submitted a proposal for a Japanese style roof set on a low profile masonry building before Wright had become involved in the project. Wright did not sign a memorandum with the Imperial Household for the project until March 1916, and not without protest from Kikutaro, who claimed that his design had been appropriated by Lloyd.

Architectural design competitions were held for the Kanagawa Prefectural office in 1920, and for the Nagoya Prefectural office in 1930, both winning entries had Japanese style roofs. Neither of these competitions had entry conditions which required Japonesque architectural designs, however as the Kanagawa Prefectural office was located in Yokohama there was a known association with Western foreigners, and Nagoya Prefectural office was in close proximity to Nagoya Castle, so a Japanese styling was included in the designs. Following this, the competition entry guidelines for the Japan Life Building (日本生命館, Nihon seimei kan), Dairei Memorial Kyōto Museum of Art (大礼記念京都美術館, Dairei kinen bijutsukan), and Military Hall (軍人会館, Gunjin Kaikan), had provisions for Japonesque architectural designs. The proportion of winning designs from entries with Japanese style roofs increased; three entries out of eight had Japanese style roofs in the Nagoya Prefectural office competition, and all ten entries in the Military Hall competition

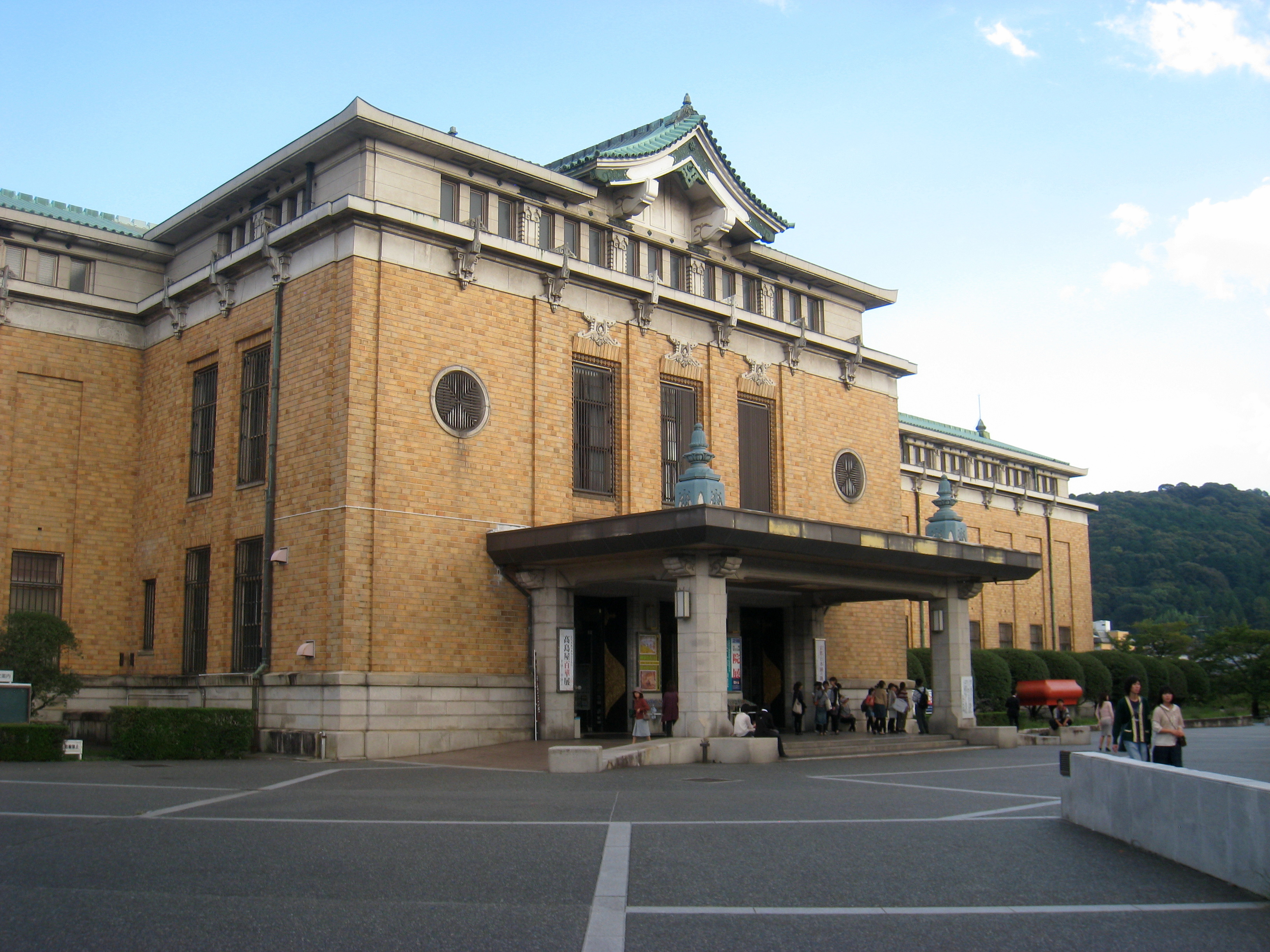
The Kyōto Municipal Museum of Art, then Darei Memorial Kyōto Museum of Art won a Japonesque architectural design competition in the 1930s

From 1930 to 1932 an architectural design competition for the Tokyō Imperial Chamber Museum (Tōkyo National Museum) (東京帝室博物館, Tōkyo teishitsu hakubutsukan) with entry guidelines stipulating Japonesque styling for submissions, however objections were raised by a younger generation of architects preferring modernist architectural styles. The Japan International Architecture Association opposed the entry guidelines and solicited architects to boycott the competition. On one side Kunio Maekawa and Chikatada Kurata, despite knowing that they would be defeated, submitted modernist-style plans. They had not ignored the competition guidelines, but as in Japanese traditional building construction involved crafting timbers in a particular way – crafting reinforced concrete as if it was timber for a particular design purpose – this was interpreted as being essentially Japanese. Kunio Maekawa's entry was supported by the youngest judge Kishida Hideta, but his decision was overturned by Chūta Itō, and the proposal was not successful. Despite this, Kunio Maekawa gained sympathy for his stance of promoting modernism, and became a hero to his professional peers.

To the architects of the 1930s these Japanese styled roofs set on Japonesque buildings, appeared to be a revival of the Emperor's Crown Amalgamate Style and therefore used the term Emperor's Crown Style. To Chūta Itō, the modification of Classic architecture that required a Japanese style roof, and in the Emperor's Crown Amalgamate Style, which was a legitimate Classic architectural design that had a Japanese style roof; despite them being distinctly different, he condemned both styles calling them "national disgraces" . However at the time, Emperor's Crown Amalgamate Style was mostly forgotten, so a minor idea such as a Japanese style was not enough to prevent any confusion.

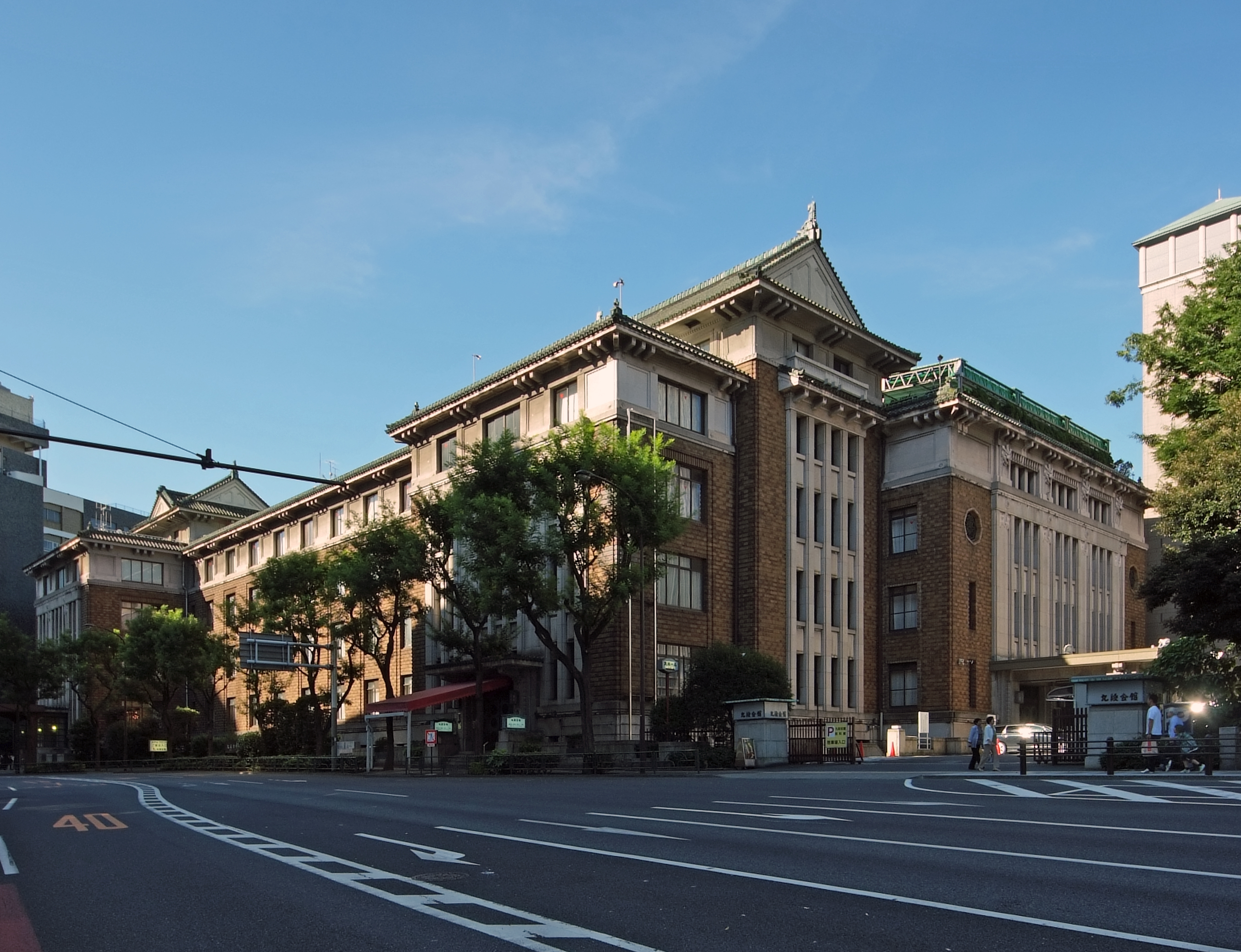
The Military Hall was another winning design in architectural competitions encouraging entries to have Japonesque components. Today the building is known as Kudan Hall in Kudanminami.

In 1937 the Sino-Japanese War began, and the Steel Fabrication Real Rights Building Approval Regulation (鉄鋼工作物権造許可規制, Tekkō kōsaku bukken kyoka shisei). (Note: This translation was chosen to reflect the influence of the Prussian empire, on property law in post-Meiji Restoration Japan, from the German Sachenrecht or 「物権」in Japanese) was issued, which limited buildings requiring over 50 tons of steel to be limited to munitions related structures only. Circumstances meant that no longer could decorative buildings be constructed, and along with a period of decline of older architectural designs, the development of Japonesque architecture was forced to stop. On the other hand, the increasing influence of Modernist architecture benefited from the regulatory standards governing building functionality, and rebound after the end of the war.

The end of World War II, began a period repudiation of pre-war Statism in Shōwa Japan to give way to post-war democratisation. The post-War Modernist architects who had been repressed by the Japanese architectural industry, became personal opponents of fascism. There had not been an instance where modernism in Japanese architecture, had opposed Japanese fascism, however they opposed fascism by condemning the easily made association of Japan's postwar recovery and the Japonesque architecture of pre-war fascist Japan. Because the architects who had promoted Japonesque architecture had lost their political influence, they were unable to counter the argument that Japonesque architecture represented fascism.

== Development ==
In 1911 architect "George" Kikutarō Shimoda (Note: Shimoda was a naturalised citizen of the USA after marrying Frank Lloyd Wright's secretary.) who had designed the Tor Hotel in Kobe, received a formal request from Aisaku Hayashi (林愛作) General Manager of the Imperial Hotel, Tokyo, for a complete preliminary study to be conducted for the rebuilding of the Imperial Hotel. Prior to his engagement in this project, Shimoda had been employed as a draughtsman by Frank Lloyd Wright in Chicago, but was not held in high regard. In Wright's autobiography, he described Shimoda as a yellow-faced and evil-eyed, and then assaulted and terminated his employment.

Shimoda returned to Japan, and submitted two preliminary design drawings. Shimoda avoided strictly imitating Western architectural styles seen in large scale hotel projects of the period, by amalgamating the East Asian hip-and-gable roof (入母屋, Irimoya) style and floor plan of Phoenix Hall Byōdō-in, into an earthquake resistant building. In March 1916, Following Shimoda's submission, the project architect was changed to Frank Lloyd Wright, who signed a memorandum with the Imperial Household. When Wright's design plans became known to Shimoda, he made claims that his work had been plagiarised. The Imperial Hotels executives conceded to the considerable demands for compensation that Shimoda had made, during a six-year copyright dispute over the architectural designs for the hotel. A review of Shimoda's work conducted by the Akita Prefectural Museum found that Wright had retained most of Shimoda's design, but replaced the Japanese roof with a Prairie School–styled roof.

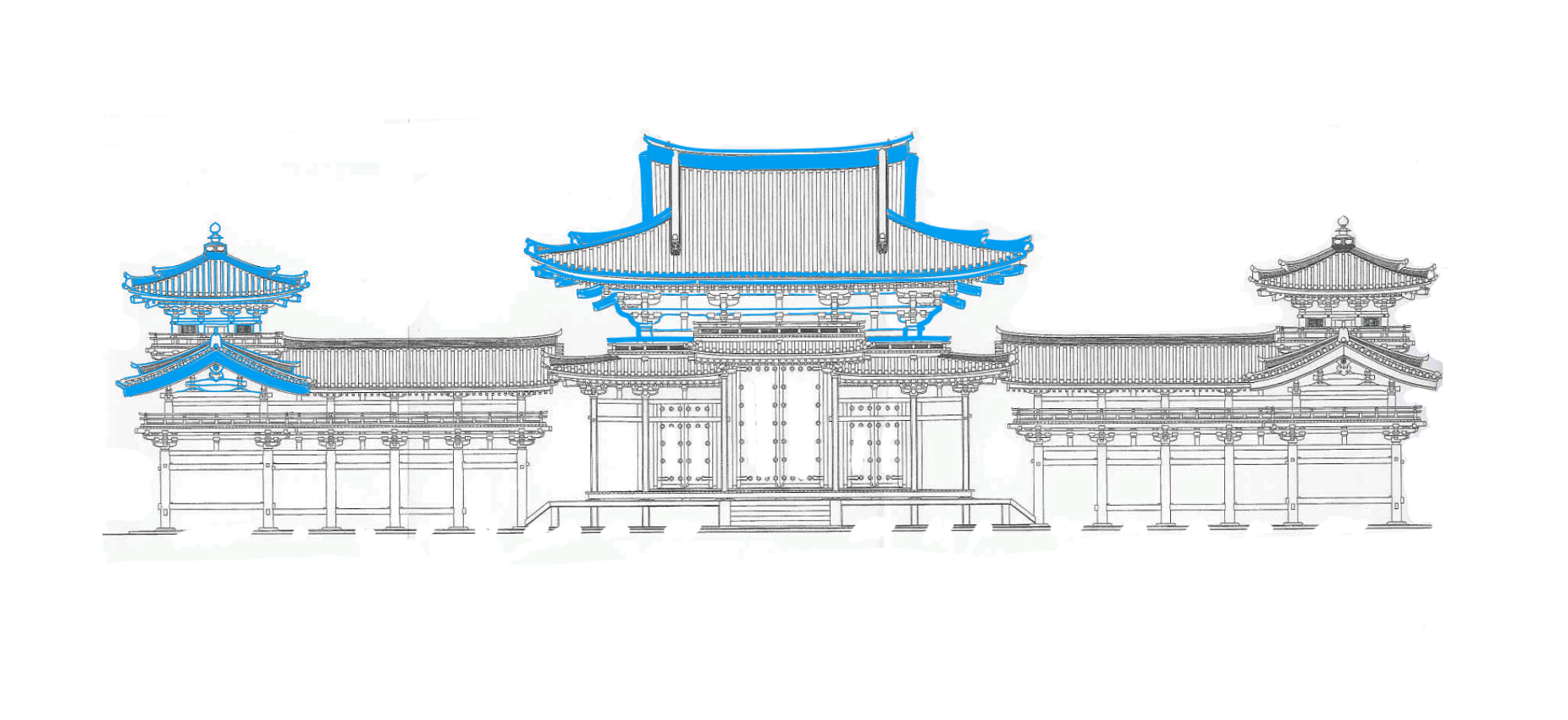
In this Ground front elevation of Byōdō-in, the roof components Kikutarō Shimoda incorporated into Imperial Crown amalgamate style, are highlighted in blue.

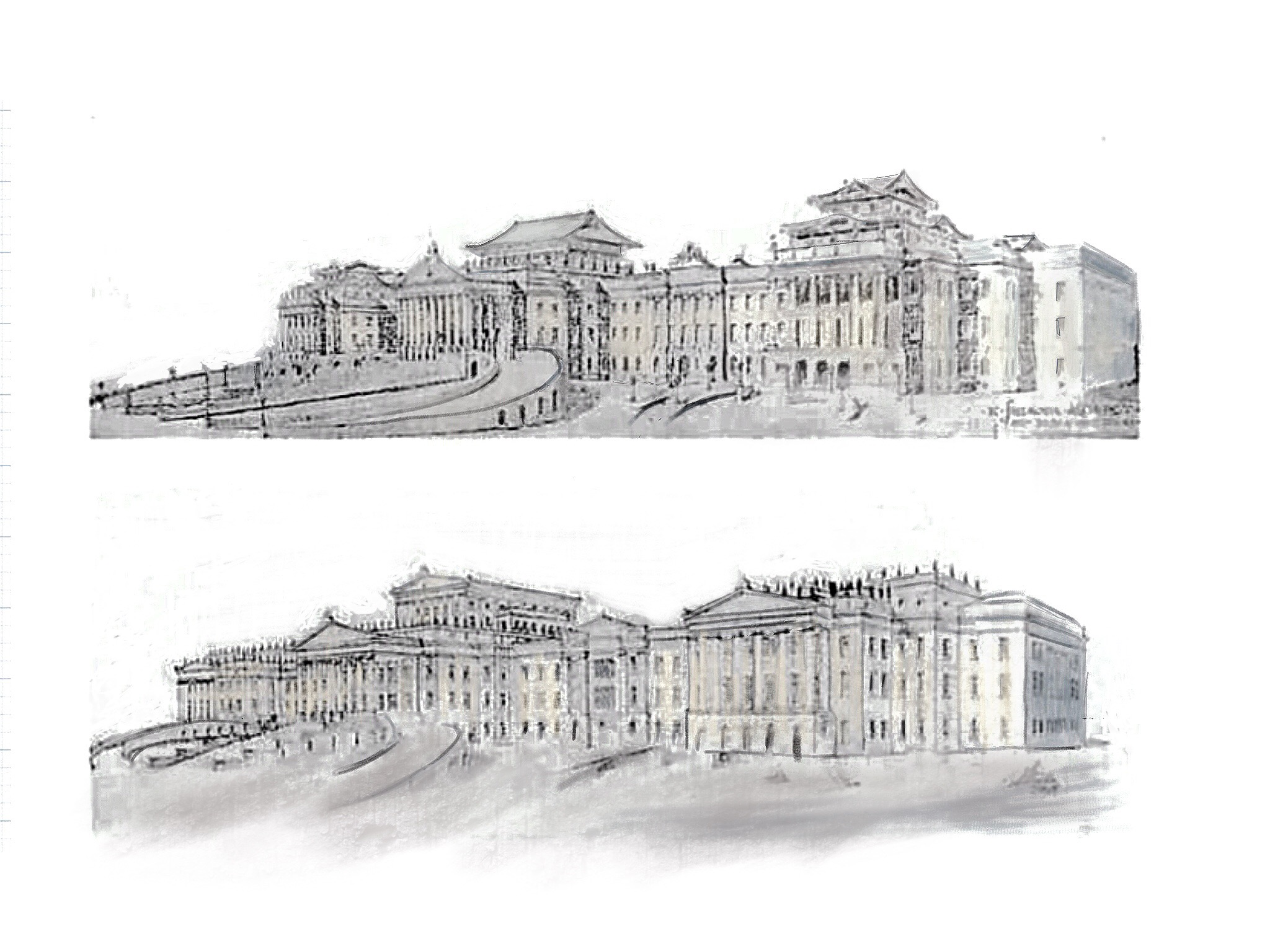
Drawings of Shimoda Kikutaro's design of the Diet building in the Imperial Crown amalgamate style (1919)

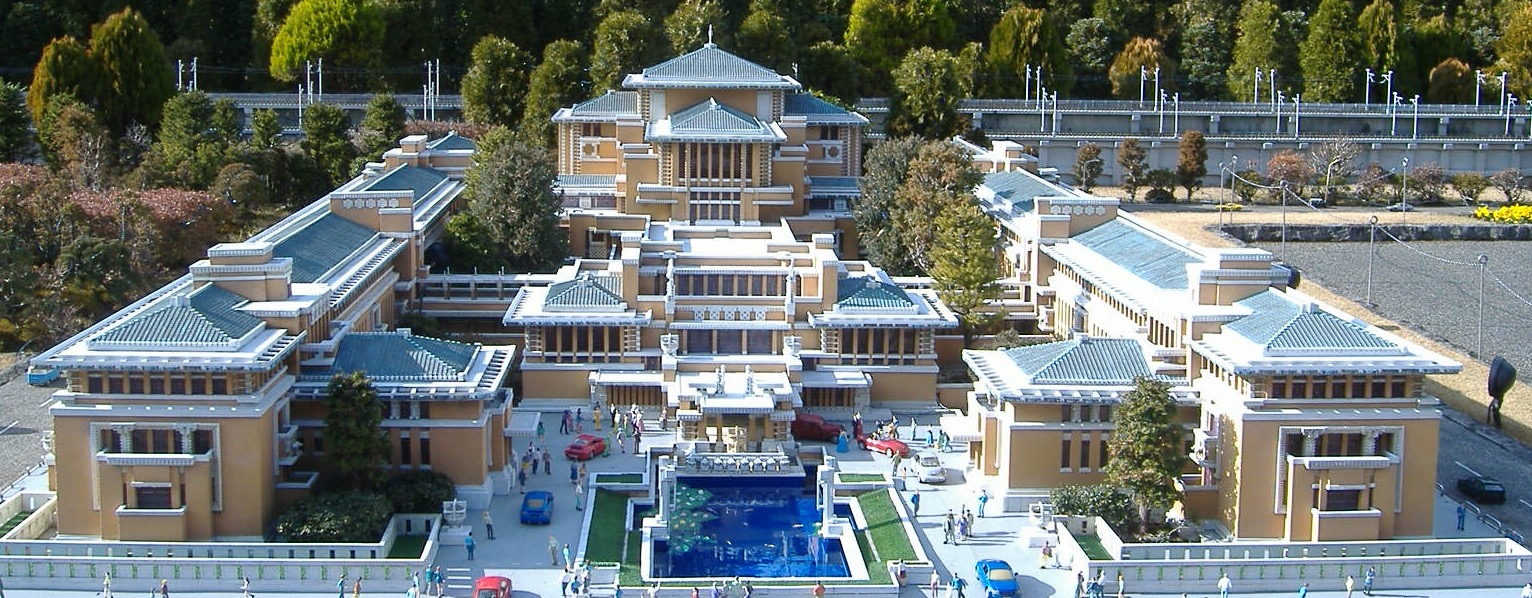
Model of the Imperial Hotel, a project both Kikutarō Shimoda and Frank Lloyd Wright had been employed to design

Having left the Imperial Hotel project, Shimoda submitted preliminary studies for the Imperial Diet building competition which was not successful. However his petitions to the National Diet were successful in having the final design changed, and to draw attention to what became known as Imperial Crown Amalgamate Style to the government, public, and his professional peers. It was not until the early 1930s that Military Hall, was built conforming to Shimoda's specifications for Imperial Crown Amalgamate style. The Kanegawa Prefectural Office, had been built before Military Hall, but had already departed from Shimoda's original style. As more examples by different architects became more popular in the 1930s, most variations in design became known as Emperor's Crown Style.

The Kanagawa Prefectural office competition specifications were for a building which had to be clearly visible, and identifiable from ships approaching the entrance of the harbour. The result included definitive architectural features such as an eclectic Beaux-Arts and five-story pagoda styled high tower with a Japonesque Emperor's Crown styled roof. The use of scratched tiles were adopted from Frank Lloyd Wright's Imperial Hotel, and the flowering motifs used throughout the building are based on the features of Byodō-in temple. The building's tower is referred to as "King's Tower", and complements the domed temple-bell-shaped tower roof of the Yokohama Customs Building called "Queen's Tower". Although not built in any of the Imperial Crown Styles, Yokohama Harbor Memorial Pavilion is referred to as "Jack's" tower.

=== Military Hall ===
Military Hall and Tokyo National Museum are considered to be exemplary representations of Imperial Crown Style architecture, based on the traditional curved roof component adopted from Japanese Buddhist temple architecture and reinforced concrete construction. However Japanese architectural scholars state that the Tokyo National Museum is not representative of Imperial Crown Style, because the exterior walls are not modelled on any of the Western architectural aesthetics consistent with the style. (Note: This distinction is described in the Japanese architectural encyclopedias Japanese Architecture-Meiji Taishō Shōwa (『日本の建築「明治大正昭和」』)and Japanese Modern Architecture (「日本の現代建築」))

== Common architectural features ==
The following are common features found in Imperial Crown Style architecture that are easily identifiable. These include the Shiroko styled roof (錣屋根, Shiroko yane) used in Military Hall (軍人会館, Gunjin kaikan), the Yuzhno-Sakhalinsk museum, and Aichi Prefectural Government Office, often with gently sloped roof ridges Japanese mune (棟, mune). Different Japanese styled roofs are also used such as a four or six polygonal tented roof Hōgyō tsukuri (宝形造) such as seen in the Nagoya City Hall, Kanagawa Prefectural Building, Seoul Metropolitan Library, Judicial Yuan Building, and Manchukuo Council Building. When tented roofs are used they are often capped with a Sōrin finial, traditionally used in Buddhist temple architecture.

Different types of Japanese gables are also used including Chidori gables (千鳥破風, Chidori hafu), which are used with Shiroko styled roofs, Irimoya gables (入母屋破風, Irimoya hafu), and Karahafu gables (唐破風, karahafu) as seen in the Kyoto Municipal Museum of Art Annex.

Traditional ornamental fittings are also incorporated into Imperial Crown Style architecture, such as the Rokuyō fittings (六葉の金具, Rokuyō no kanagu), and pagoda Sōrin and Shintō finials.

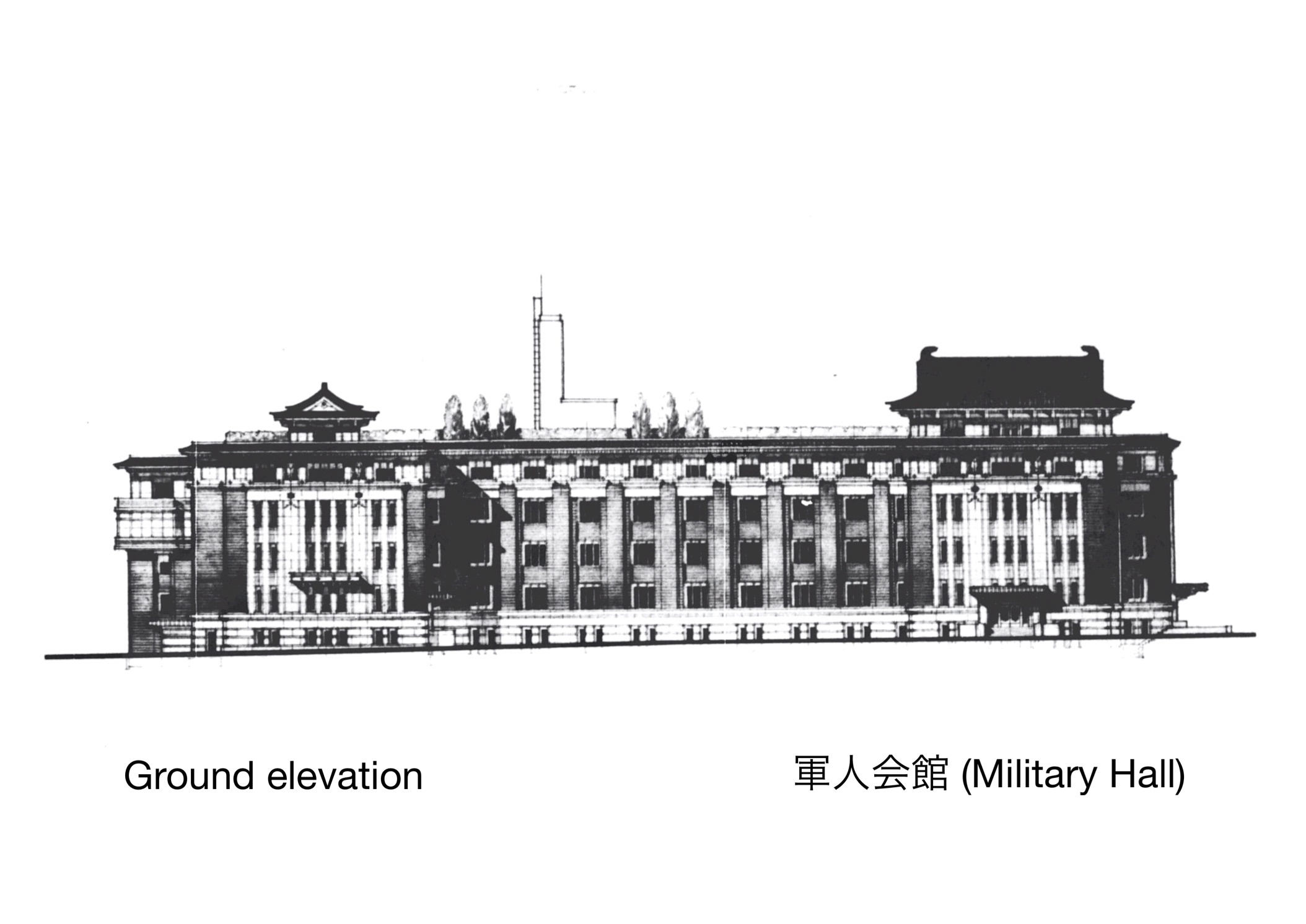
Architects ground elevation drawing of Military Hall, considered to be one of the best examples of Imperial Crown Style

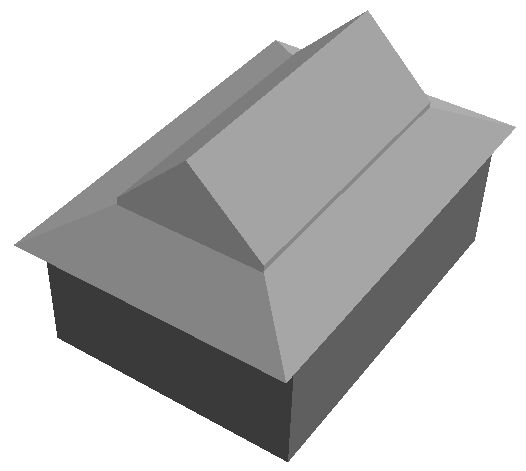
The shikoro yane is a common feature of Imperial Crown Style architecture.

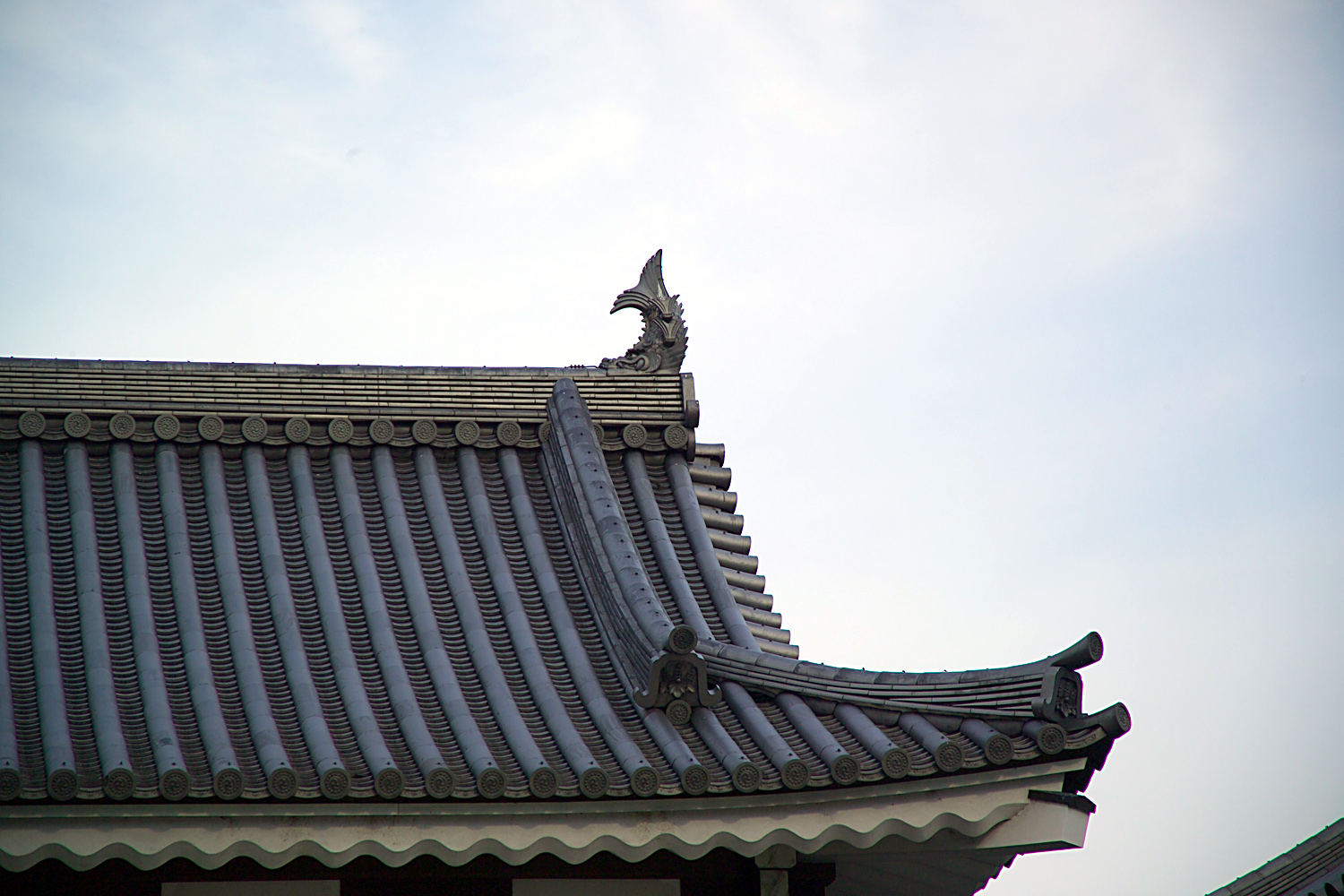
Mune or ridged roof with Shachihoko

Hōgyō tsukuri tented roof a feature of Japanese pagodas. Six- and eight-sided polygon roofs are also used.

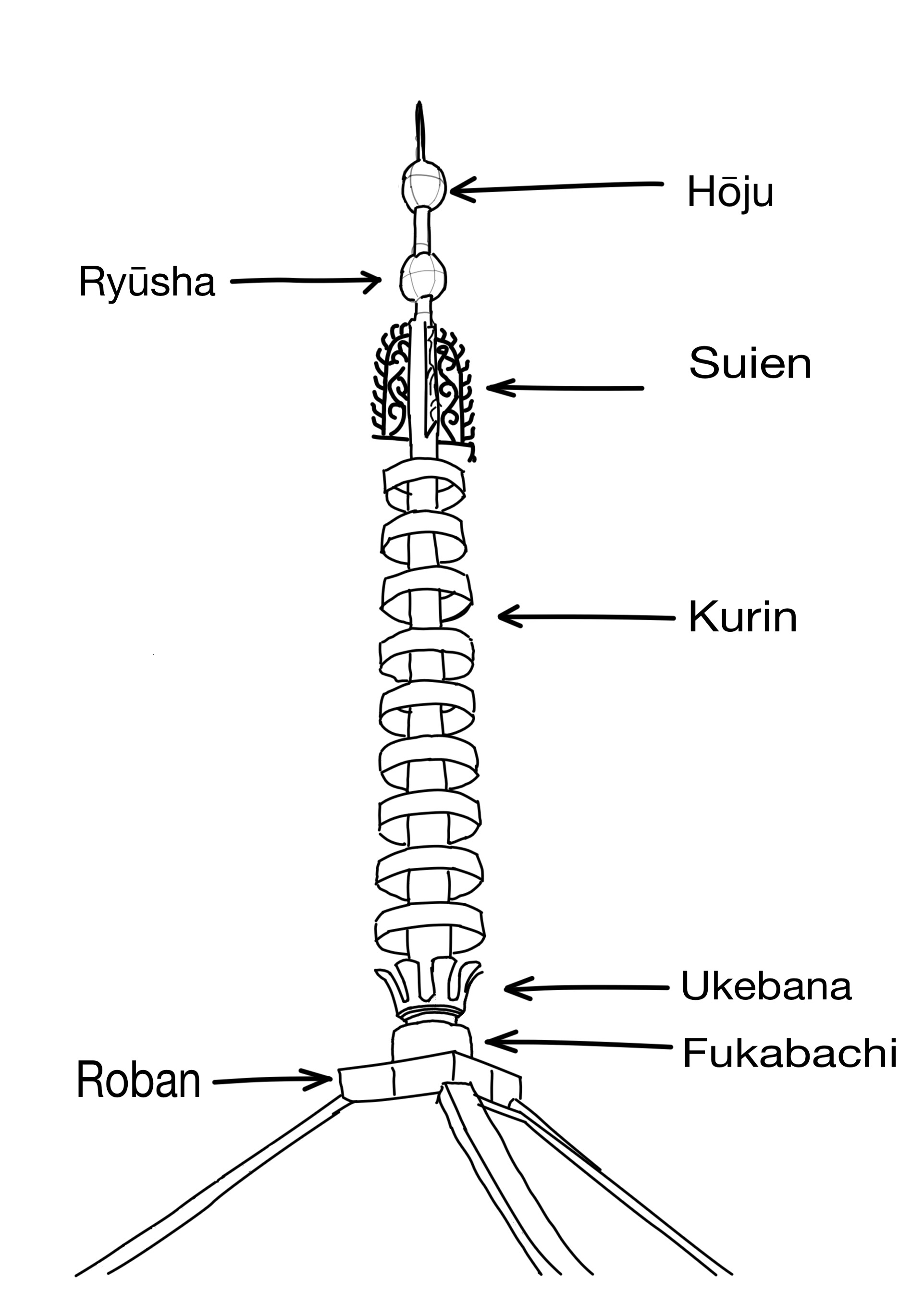
Sōrin finials are commonly used in buildings with Japanese pagoda design features.

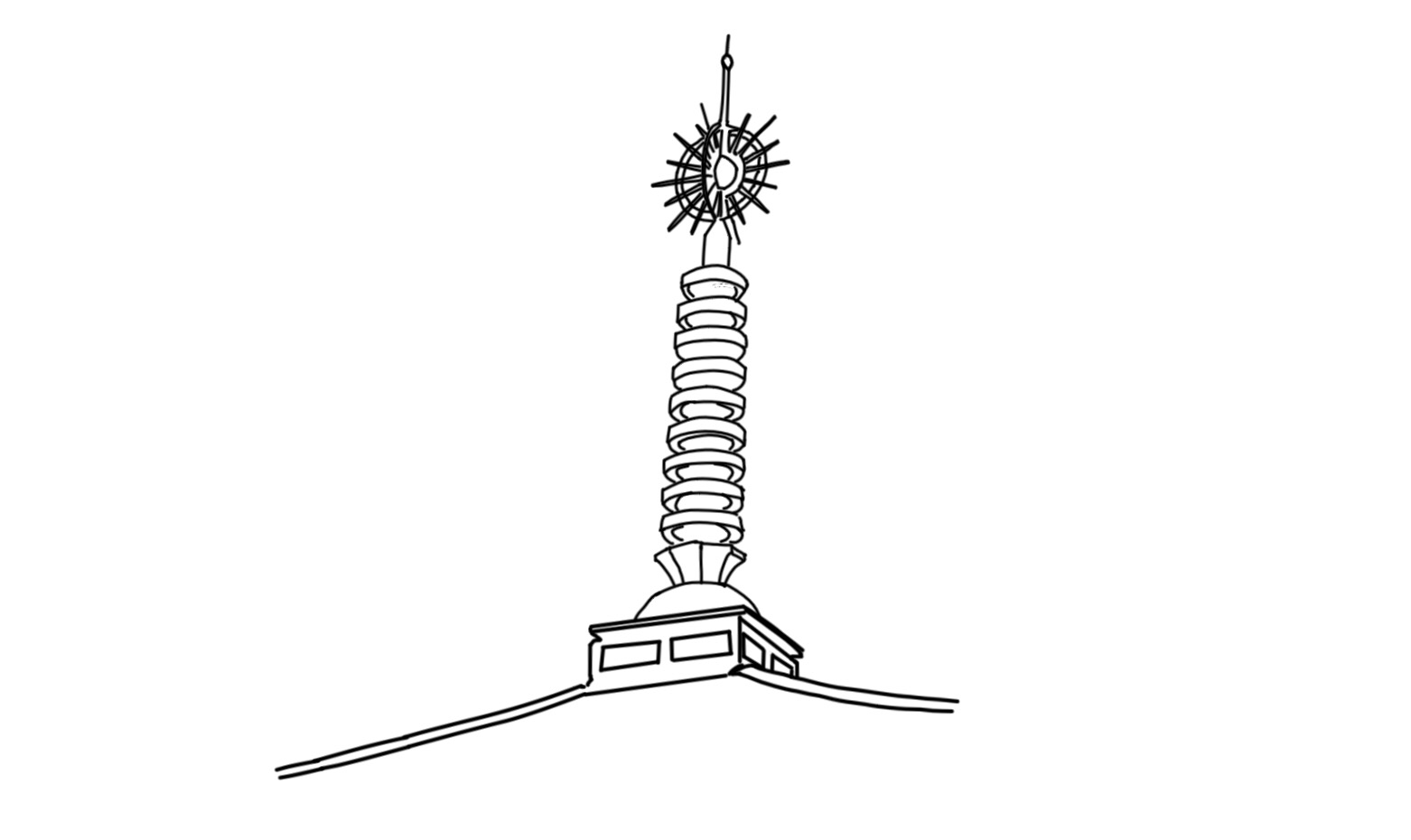
The finial on the roof of JR Nara Station has State Shintō symbolism incorporated into a traditionally Buddhist finial (Sōrin)

== Relationship with Statism in Shōwa Japan ==
According to some post war architecture critiques, Imperial Crown Style was synonymous with Statism in Shōwa Japan (天皇制ファシズム) which was a type of fascism. The position these critiques took was despite differences between the Japanese wartime building regulations, which only limited the construction materials that could be used for a project, compared to how the Third Reich implemented and promoted Nazi architecture. The directives for design regulations had specifications about aerial camouflage, but nothing requiring the inclusion of a tiled roof.

== Examples ==
=== Japan ===
Buildings in this style were characterised by having a Japanese-style roof such as the Tōkyō Imperial Museum (1937) by Hitoshi Watanabe; and Nagoya City Hall and the Aichi Prefectural Government Office.

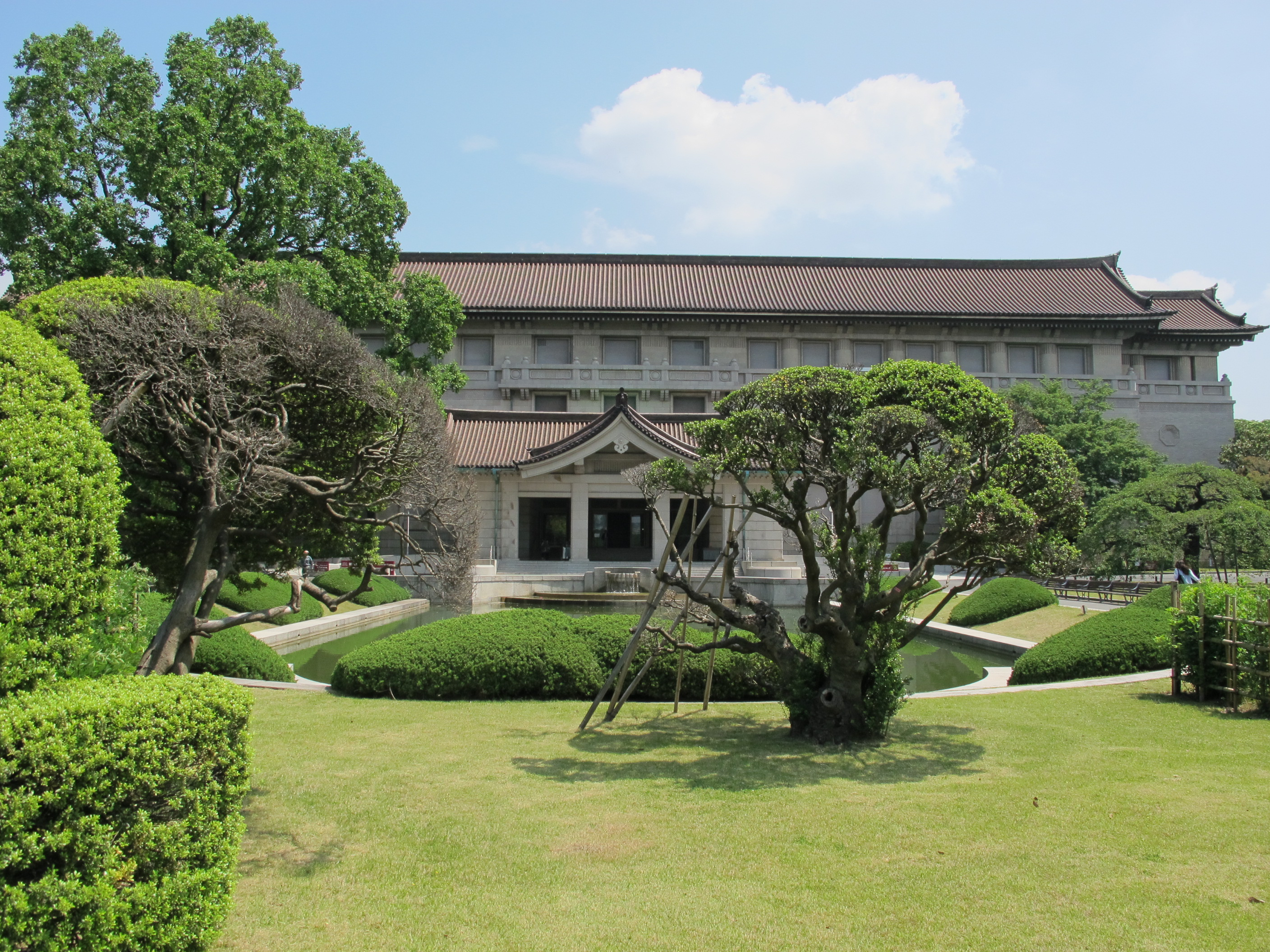
Distinct design of the roof with symmetrical landscaping to complement the architectural style of the Tokyo National Museum main building

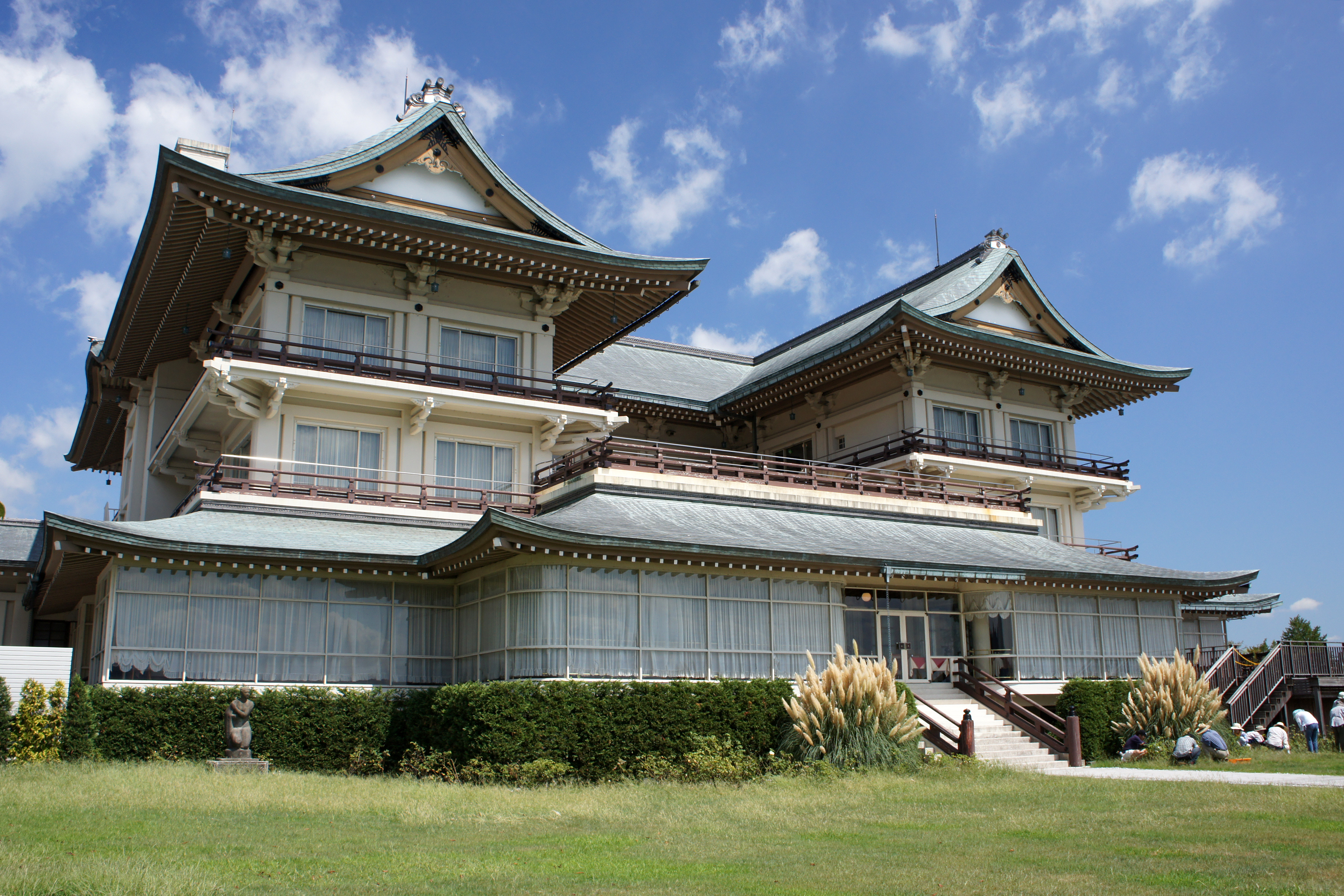
Biwako Otsukan, Yanagasaki Lakeside Park, Shiga Prefecture

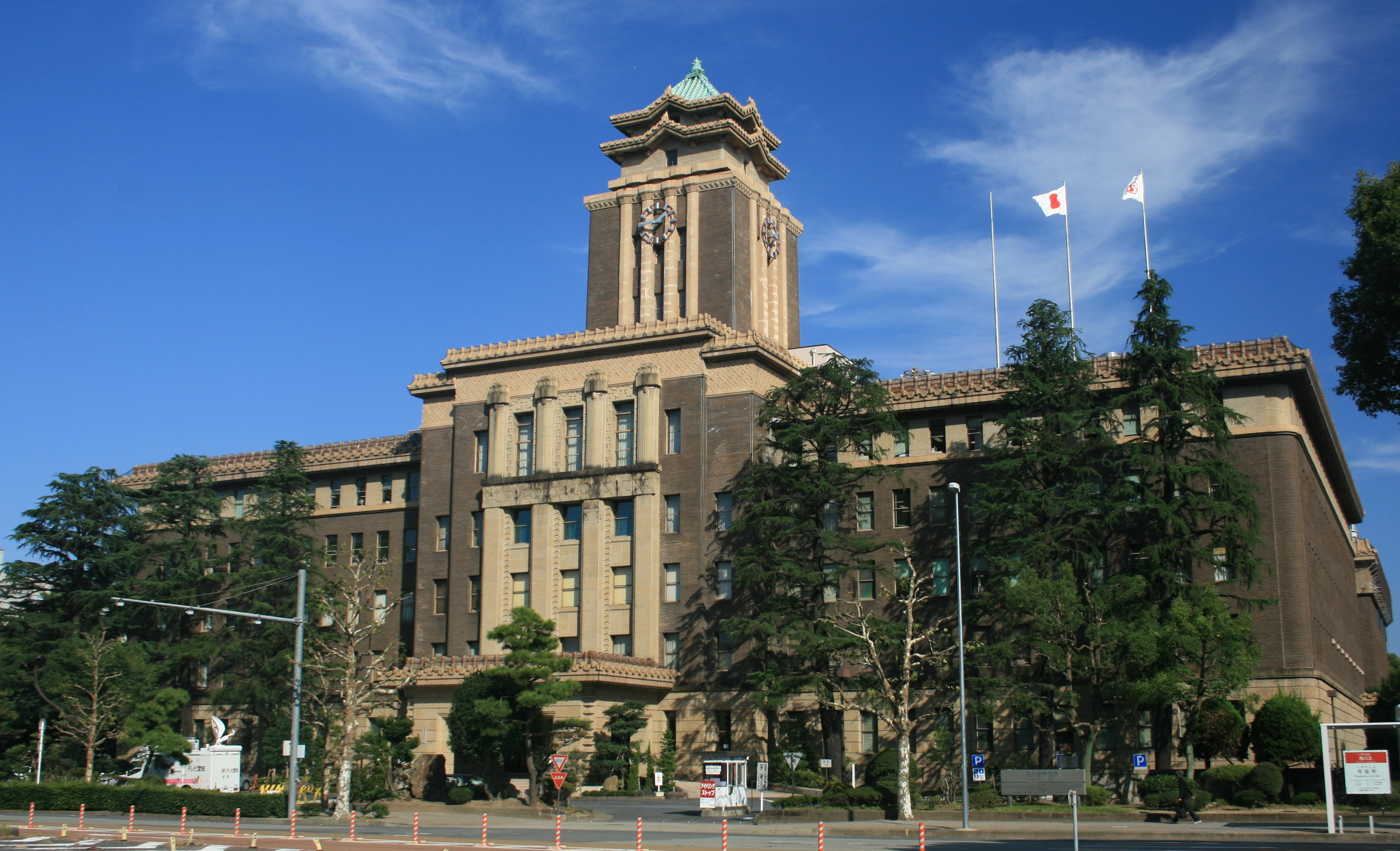
Nagoya City Hall was designed to complement the nearby neighborhood architecture, especially that of Nagoya Castle.

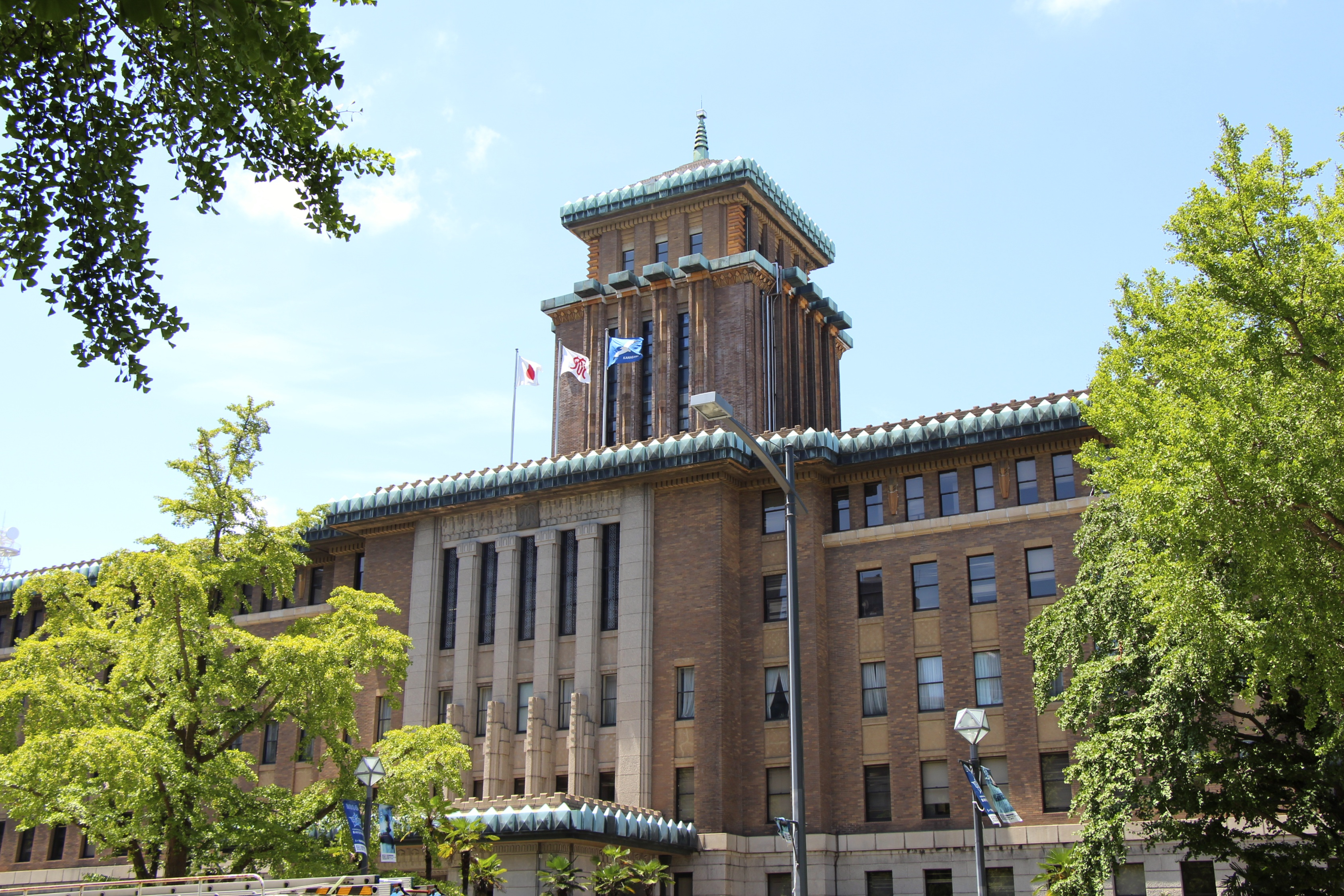
Kanagawa Prefectural Office

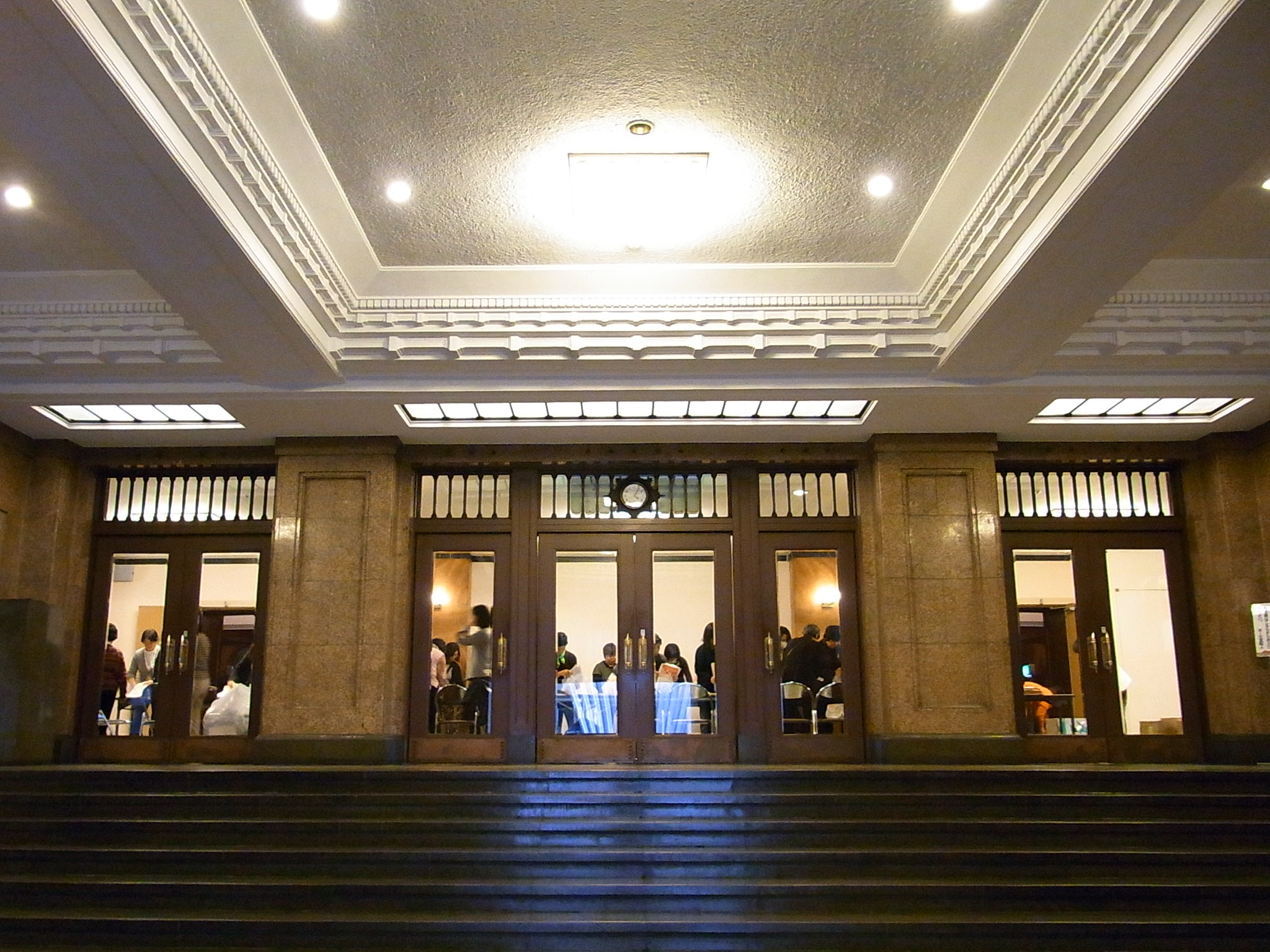
Art Deco styled ceilings and lighting leading to the entrance of Kudan Hall (Military Hall) Entrance

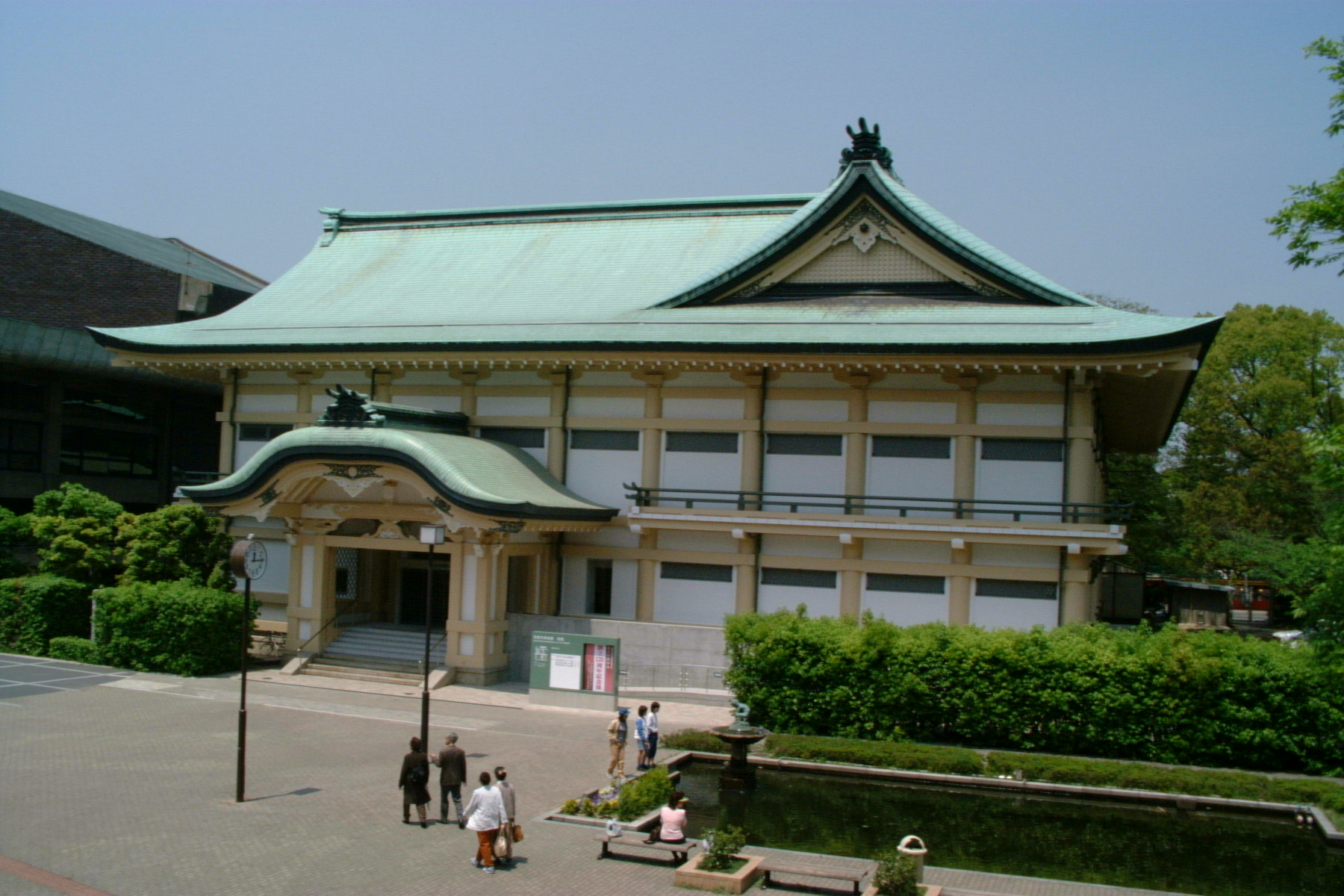
Kyoto Municipal Museum of Art Annex was constructed along with the main building features karahafu gable and Irimoya hip and gable roofing.

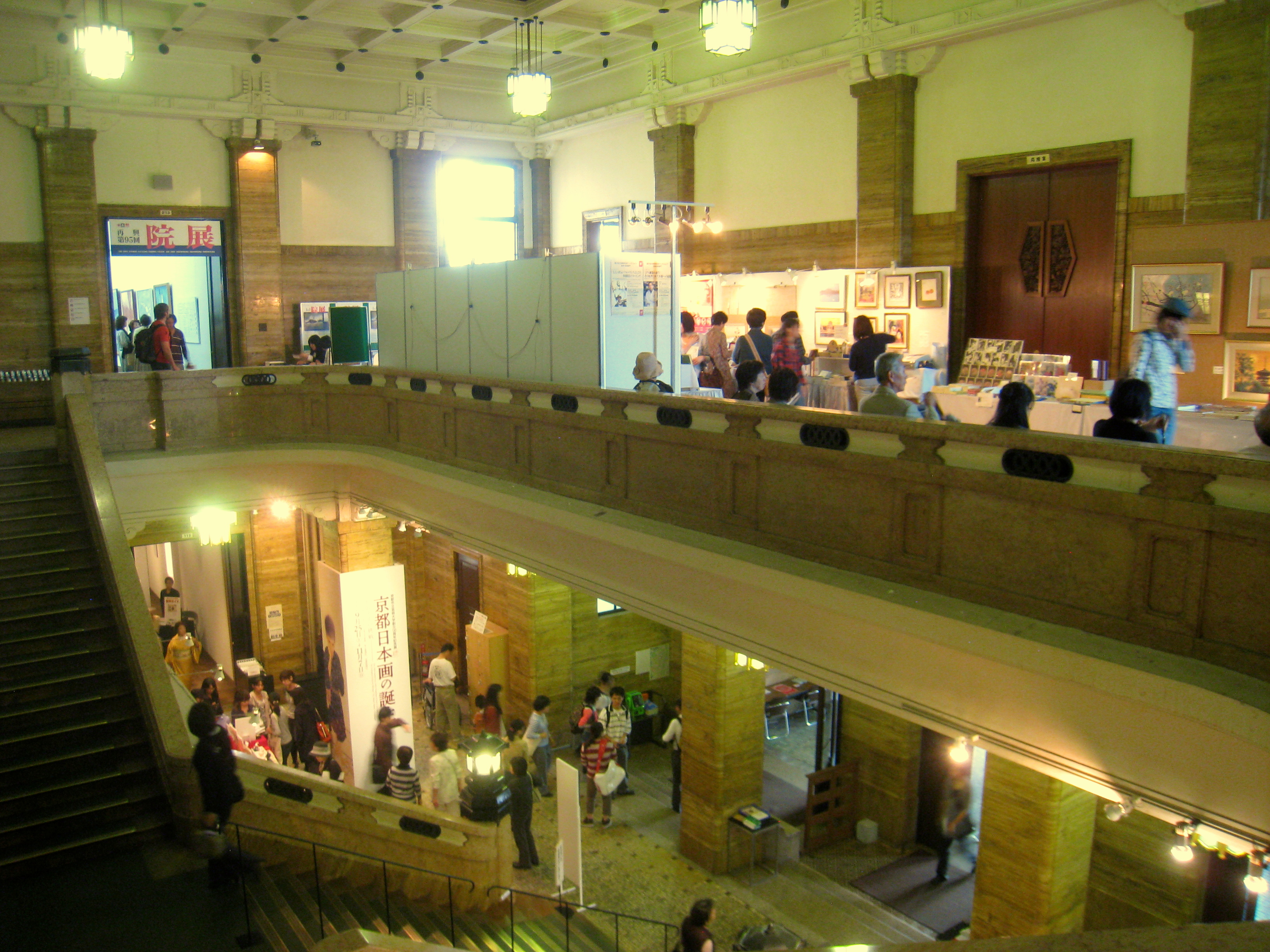
Kyoto Municipal Museum of Art interior

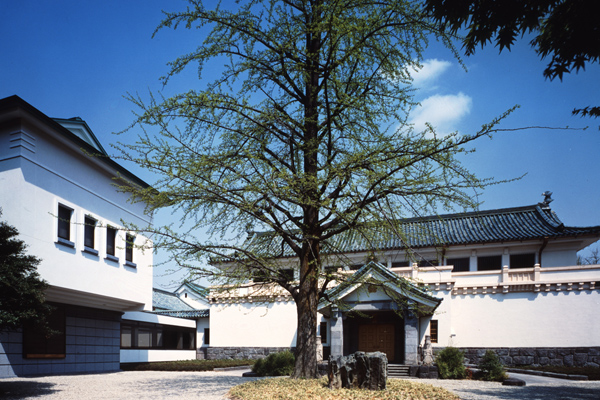
Tokugawa Art Museum, Nagoya

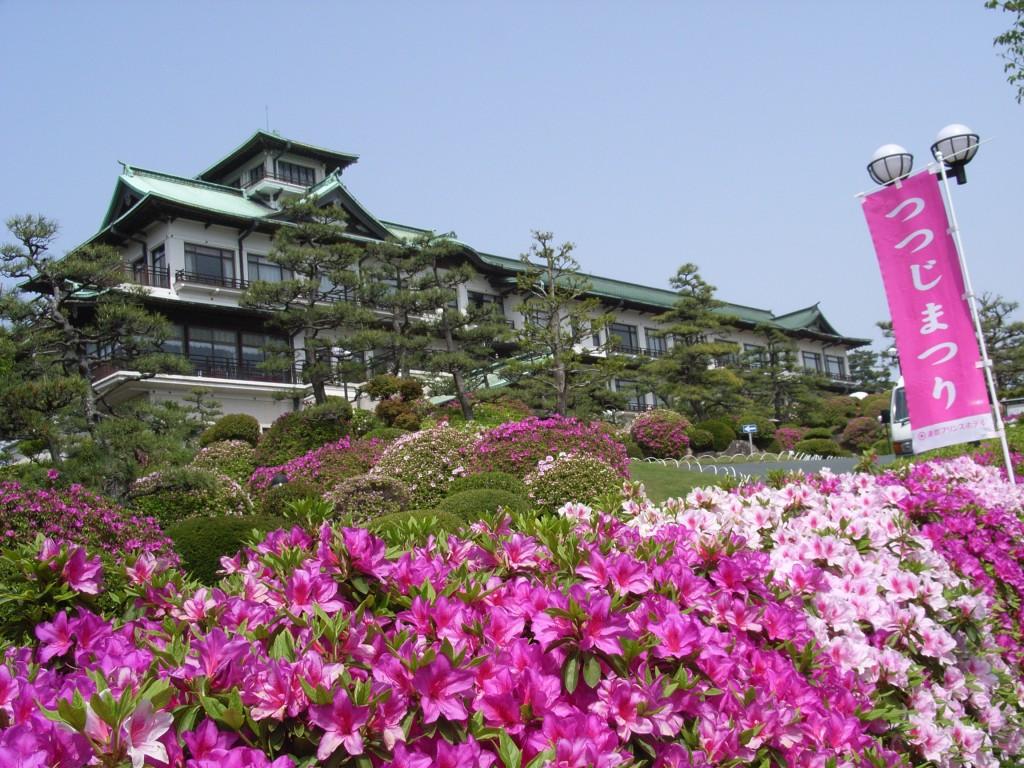
Gamagori Hotel, built in 1934

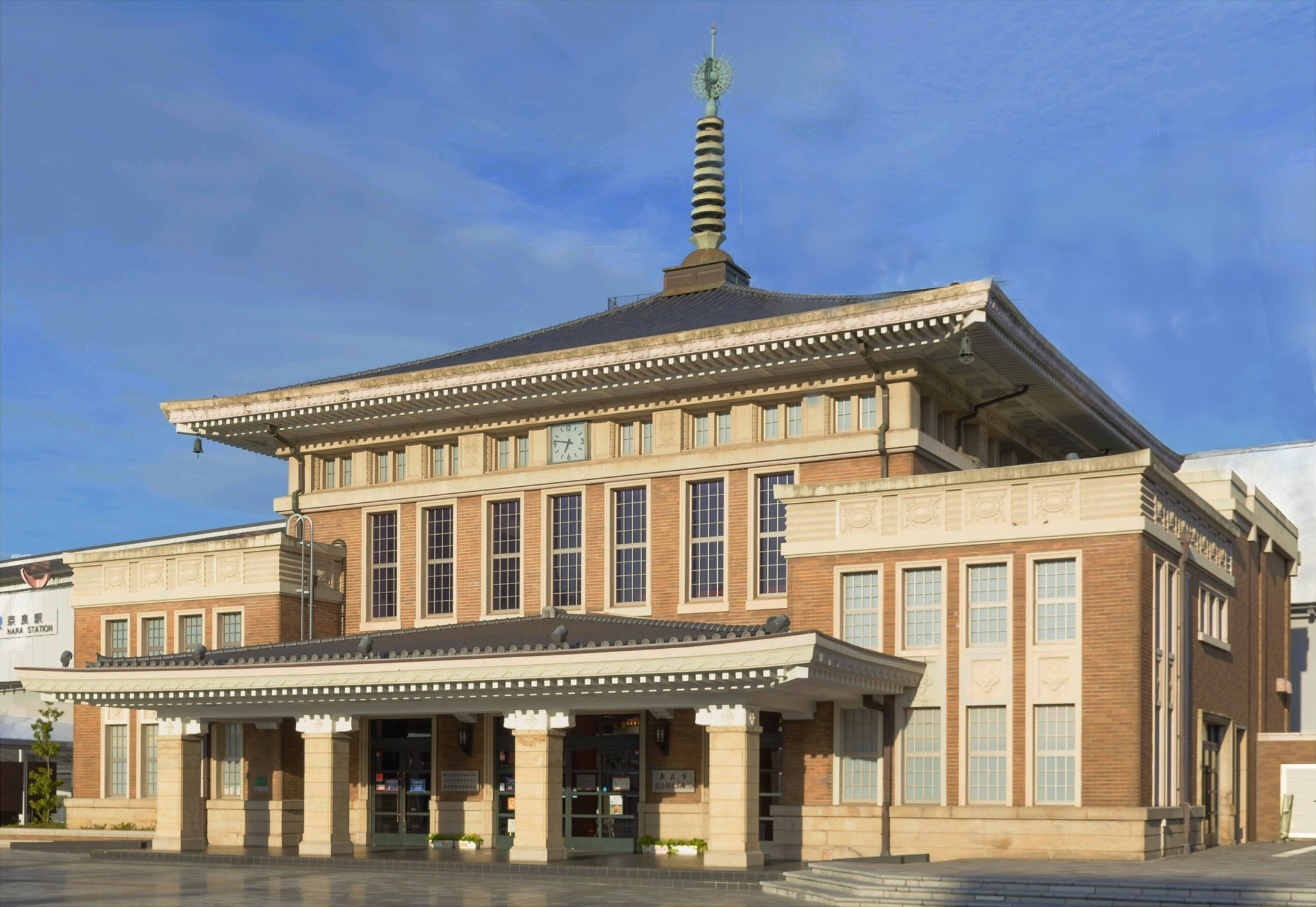
JR Nara Station built in 1934. Note the use of Shintō solar symbolism incorporated into a Buddhist temple finial (Sōrin).

=== Taiwan ===
A number of Imperial Crown Style buildings can be found in Taiwan. They were designed by Japanese architects, and constructed when Taiwan was part of the Japanese empire, in the period from 1895 to 1945. Examples of the style include the Judicial Yuan Building in Taipei, the old Kaohsiung Railway Station, Hualien District Court building, and the Kaohsiung Museum of History.

The Judicial Yuan Building was designed by the Japanese architect Ide Kaoru, and completed in 1934. The building is in an eclectic style, with a Chinese-influenced "Koa" roof on an octagonal central tower. The three circular arches and arched windows at the entrance hall reflect elements of Arabic and Islamic architecture. Ide Kaoru was responsible for many significant structures in Taiwan, including the Executive Yuan building and Zhongshan Hall in Taipei.

The Kaohsiung Museum of History was originally the old Kaohsiung City Hall, designed by Japanese architect Ōno Yonejirō, and completed in 1939. Francis Chia-Hui Lin, a Taiwanese architectural historian, notes that the shape of the Museum's central tower is suggestive of the Han character "高" which forms part of the name, "Kaohsiung City" (高雄). This name, which was given to the city by the Japanese, means "high hero". Lin also notes that the building's site incorporates a symmetric "日" shaped Han character, which symbolises the Japanese Empire's southernmost political centre. Lin says that the "日" refers both to its literal meaning, which is the sun (symbolically the origin and legitimacy of the authority), and to its ideological imagery as the Japanese Empire's initial "日"本帝國, comprising descendants of Amaterasu, a sun goddess in Shintoism. In the 1990s, the government announced plans to demolish the building, but it was conserved after lobbying by academics and the general public. It was restored and opened as a museum in 1998.

The design of the old Kaohsiung Railway Station building also incorporates the Han character "高". It was built by Shimizu Corporation and completed in 1941. In the 1990s, it was scheduled for demolition to enable the digging of new railway tunnels. However, after consulting with the public, the government agreed it should be preserved. In 2002, the 2,500 tonne structure was moved in one piece more than 80 metres from its original location. In 2021, it was moved back to its original location and now forms part of the city's modern railway hub.

For some years after World War II, as part of a process of 'de-Japanisation' (qu Ribenhua in Chinese), anti-Japanese sentiment led to some examples of Japanese architecture being demolished or modified to a more 'Chinese' style. However, in 1982 the Cultural Heritage Preservation Law was passed which provided for such relics being preserved as national assets.

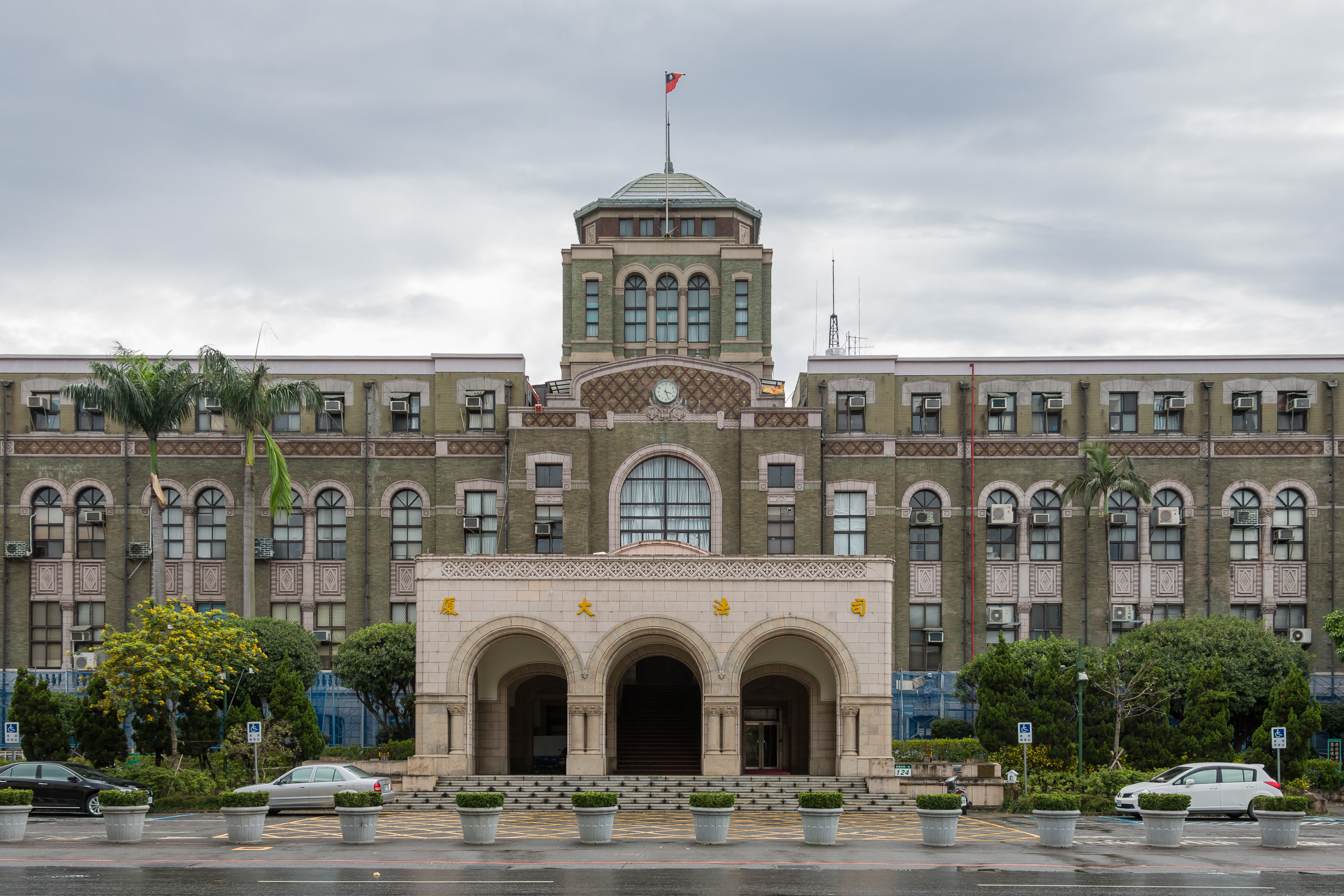
Judicial Yuan Building in Taipei, Taiwan

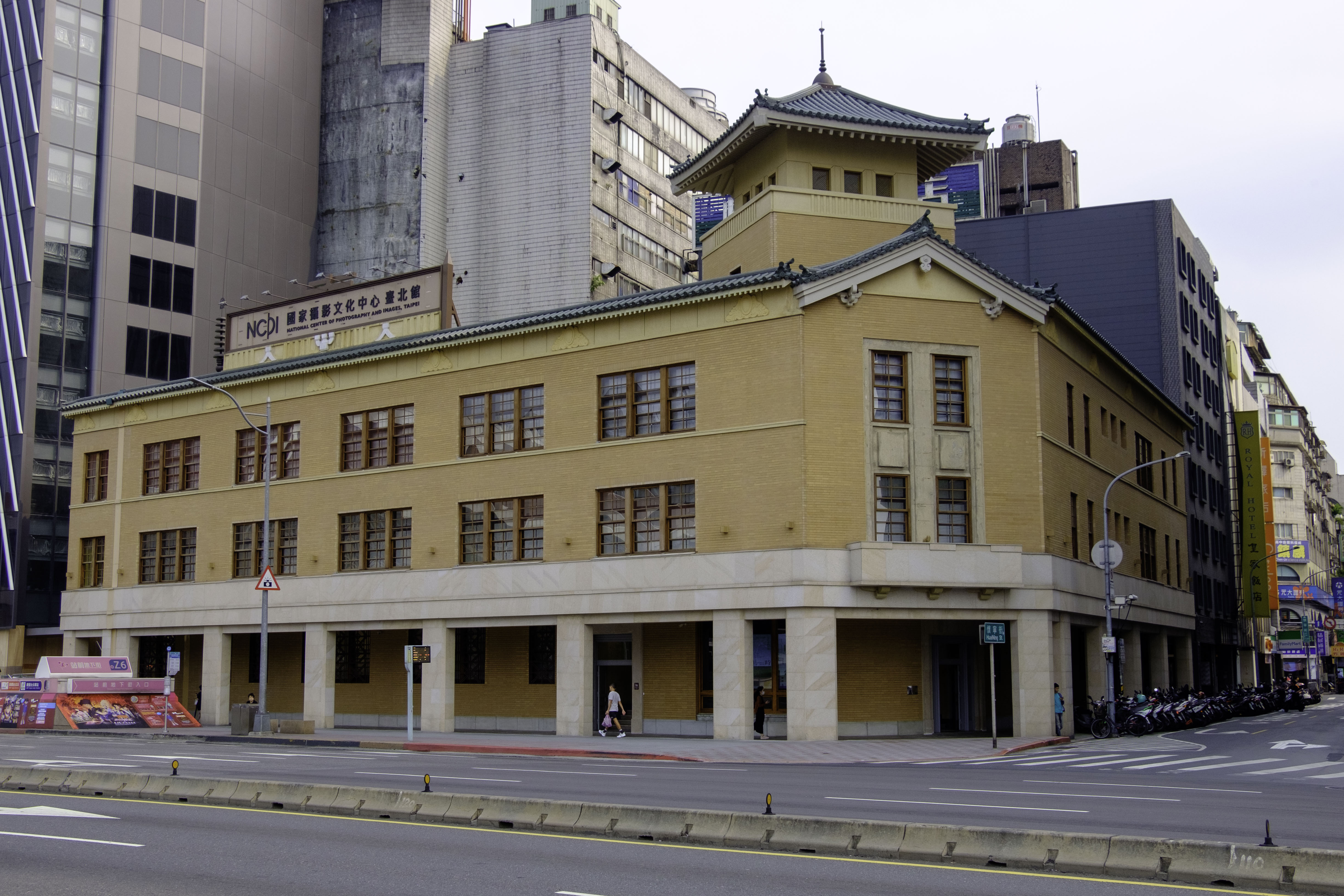
National Center of Photography and Images - Taipei

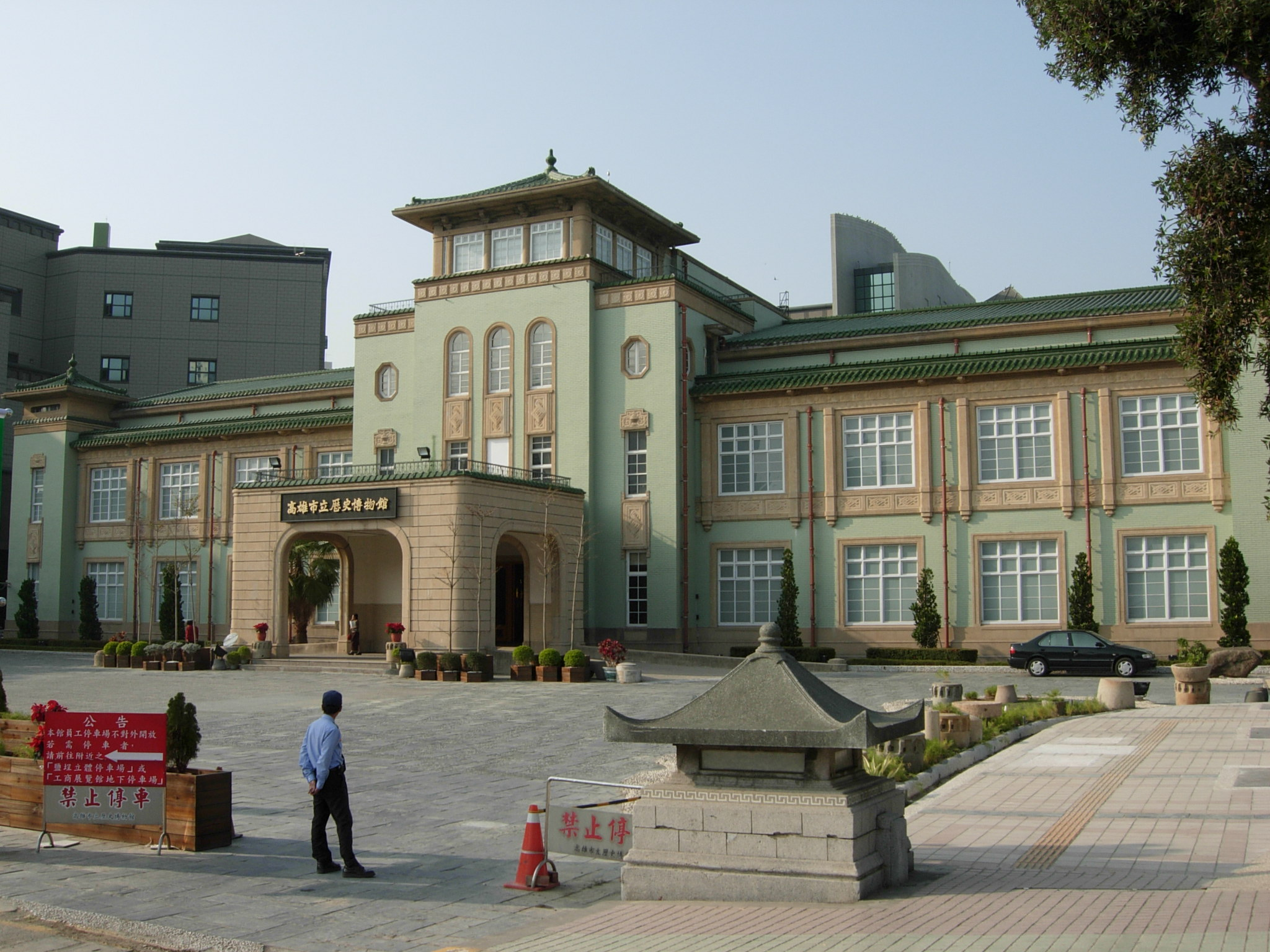
Museum of History in Kaohsiung, Taiwan

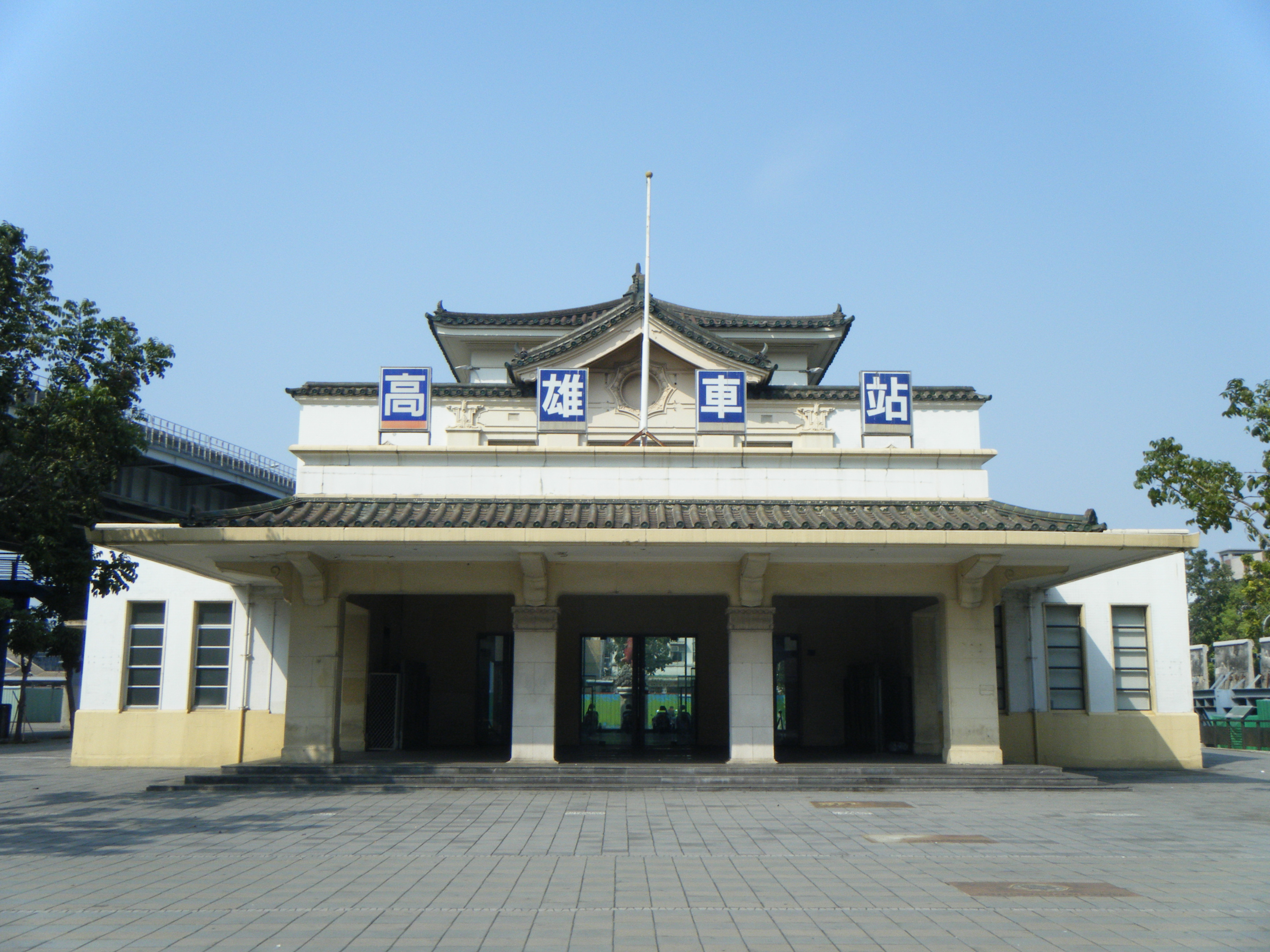
Old Railway Station in Kaohsiung, Taiwan

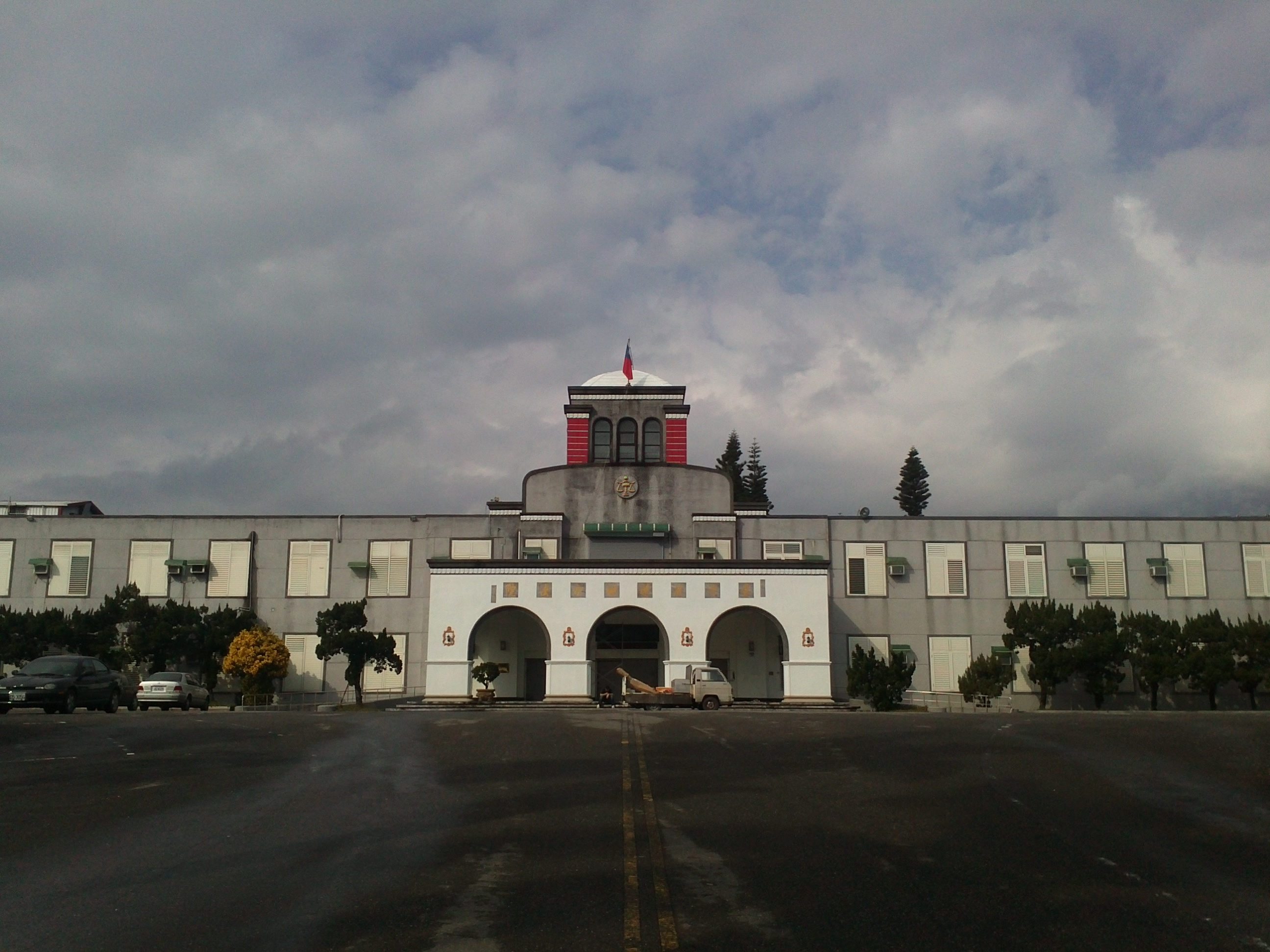
District Court in Hualien, Taiwan

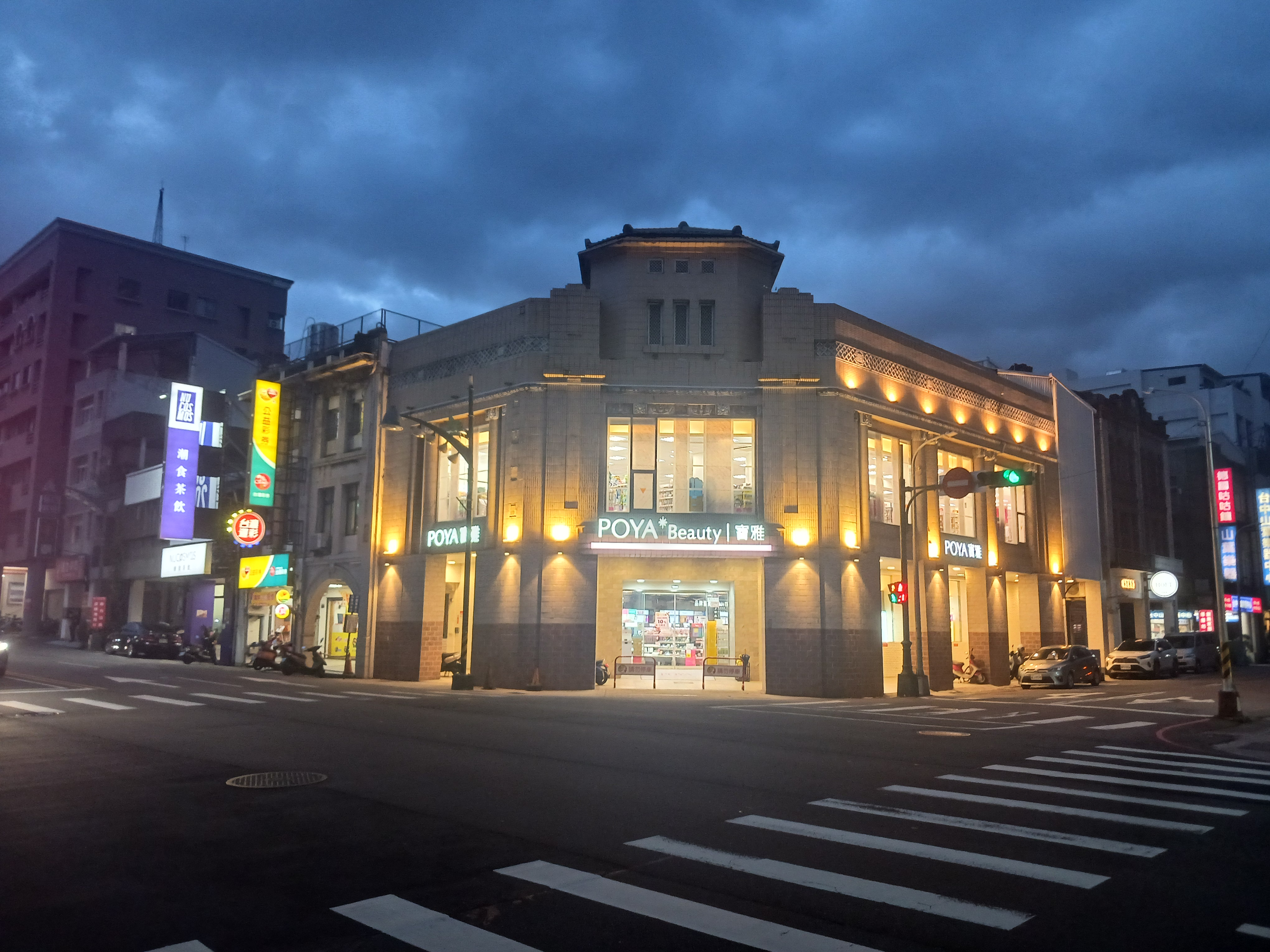
Former Hua Nan Bank Taichung Branch in Taichung, Taiwan

=== Korea ===
Examples of Imperial Crown Style architecture can also be found in Korea, including the Seoul Metropolitan Library (京城府庁舎, Keijō fuchōsha), built by the Chōsen Architectural Association (朝鮮建築会, Chōsen kenchiku kai), in the 1920s.

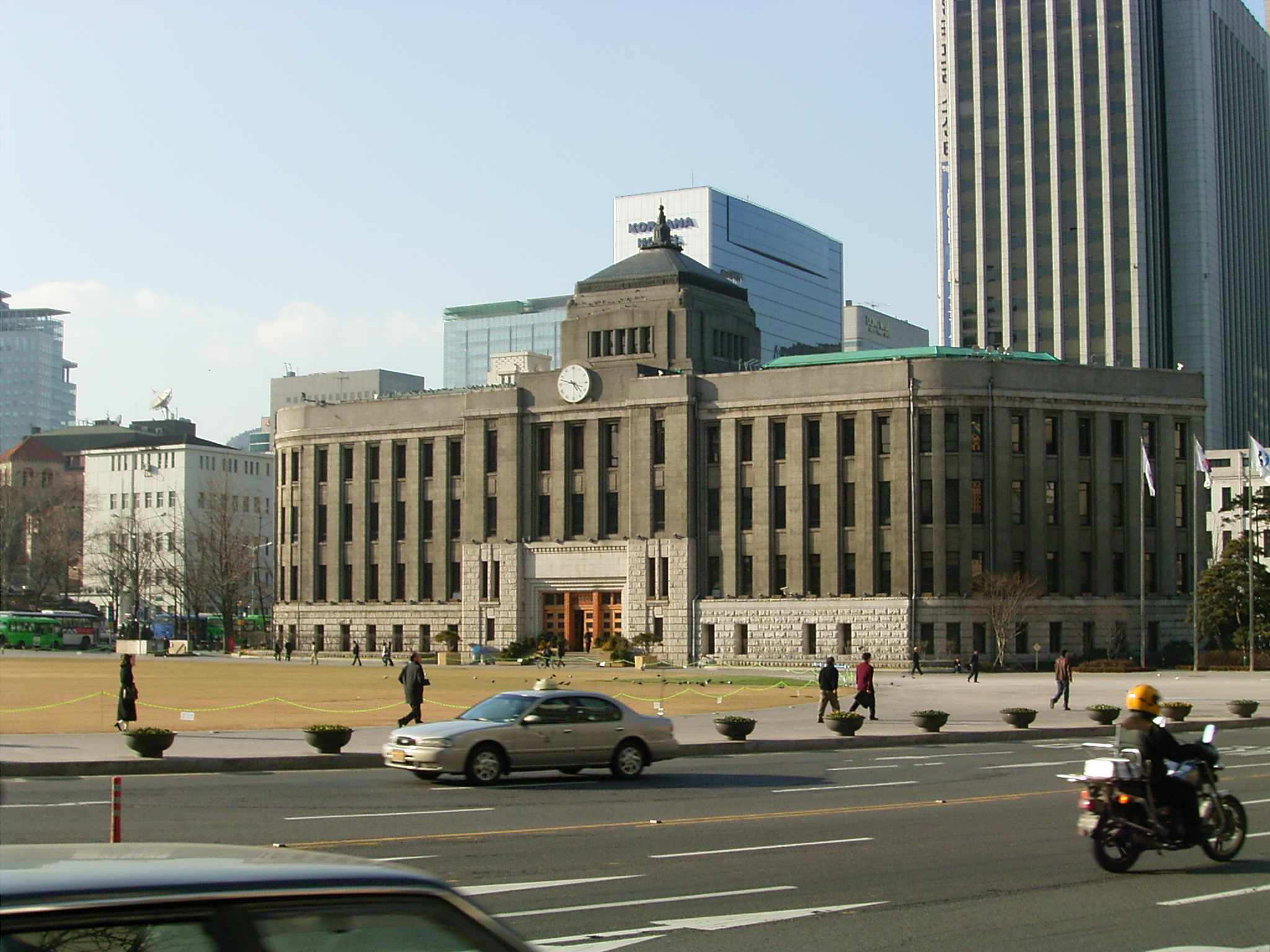
Seoul Metropolitan Library (1925), designed by Nagasaburo Iwai

=== China ===
Examples of the style were also constructed in Manchukuo, or Manchuria, a region in China which formed part of the Japanese Empire for more than a decade until 1945.

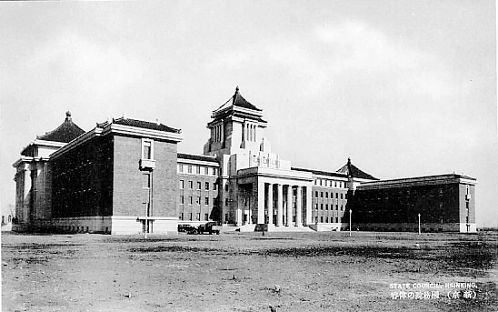
Manchukuo State Council Building, Xinjing

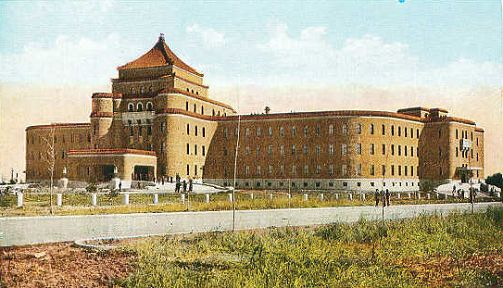
Manchukuo Supreme Court, built 1938

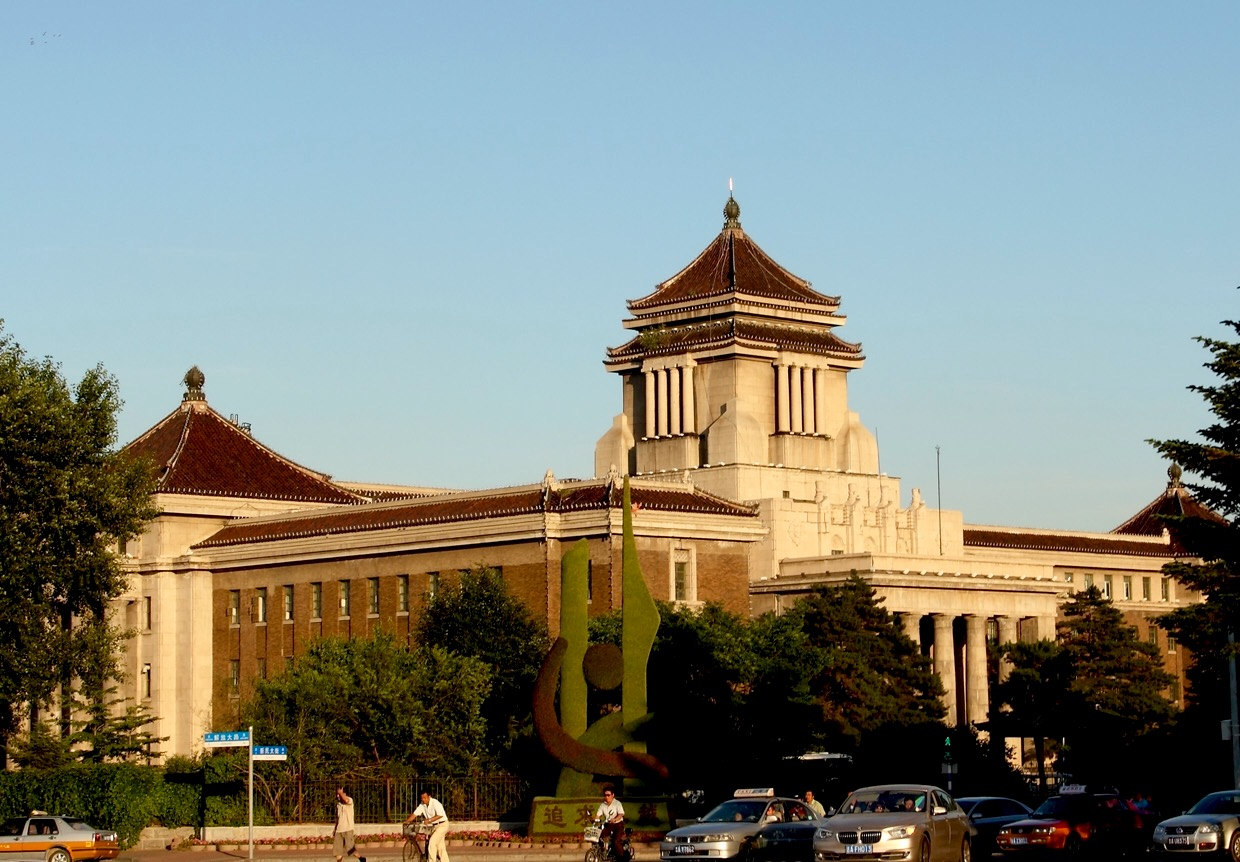
Manchukuo State Council Building In 2011

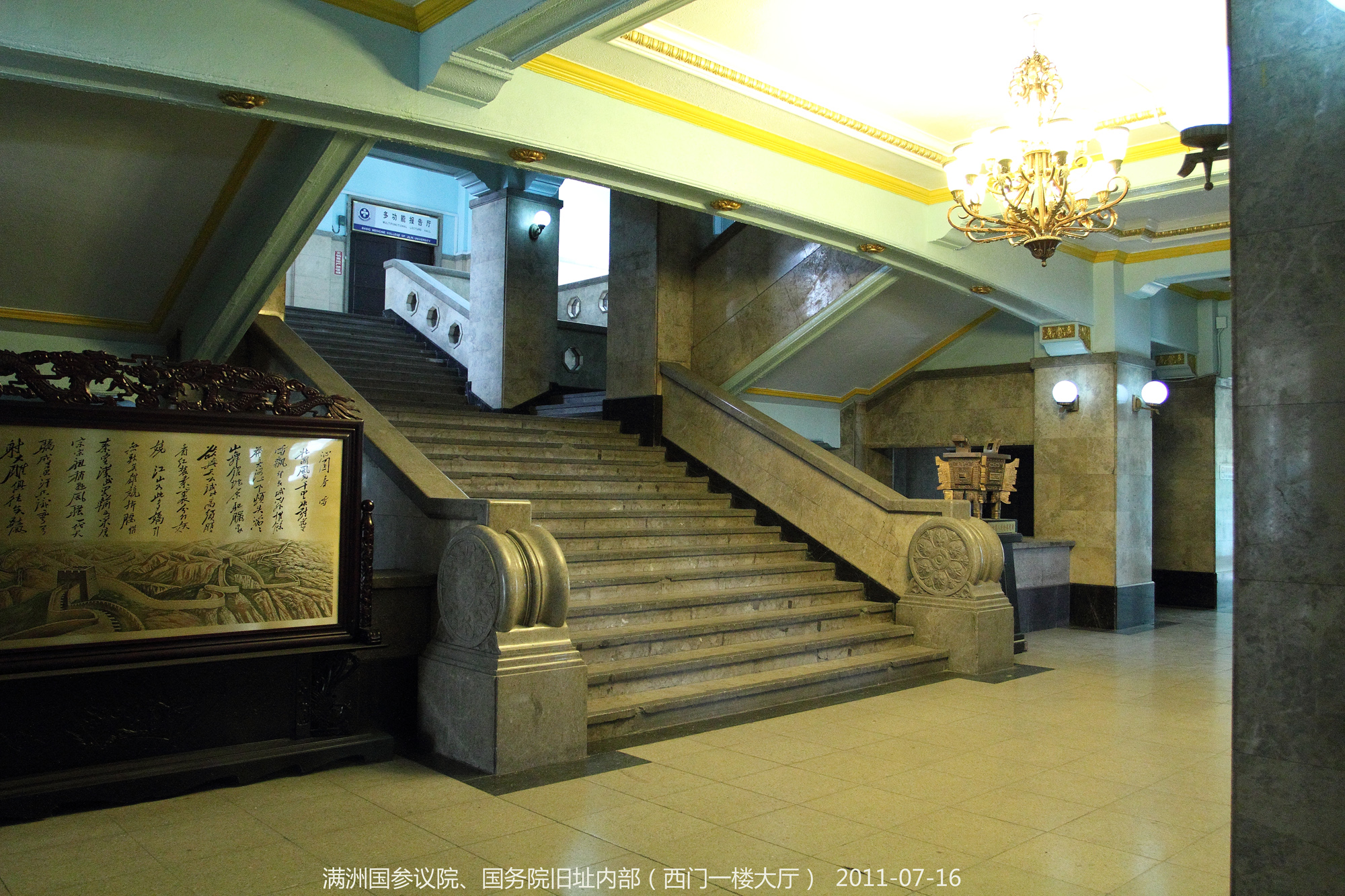
Grand staircase of Manchukuo State Council Building

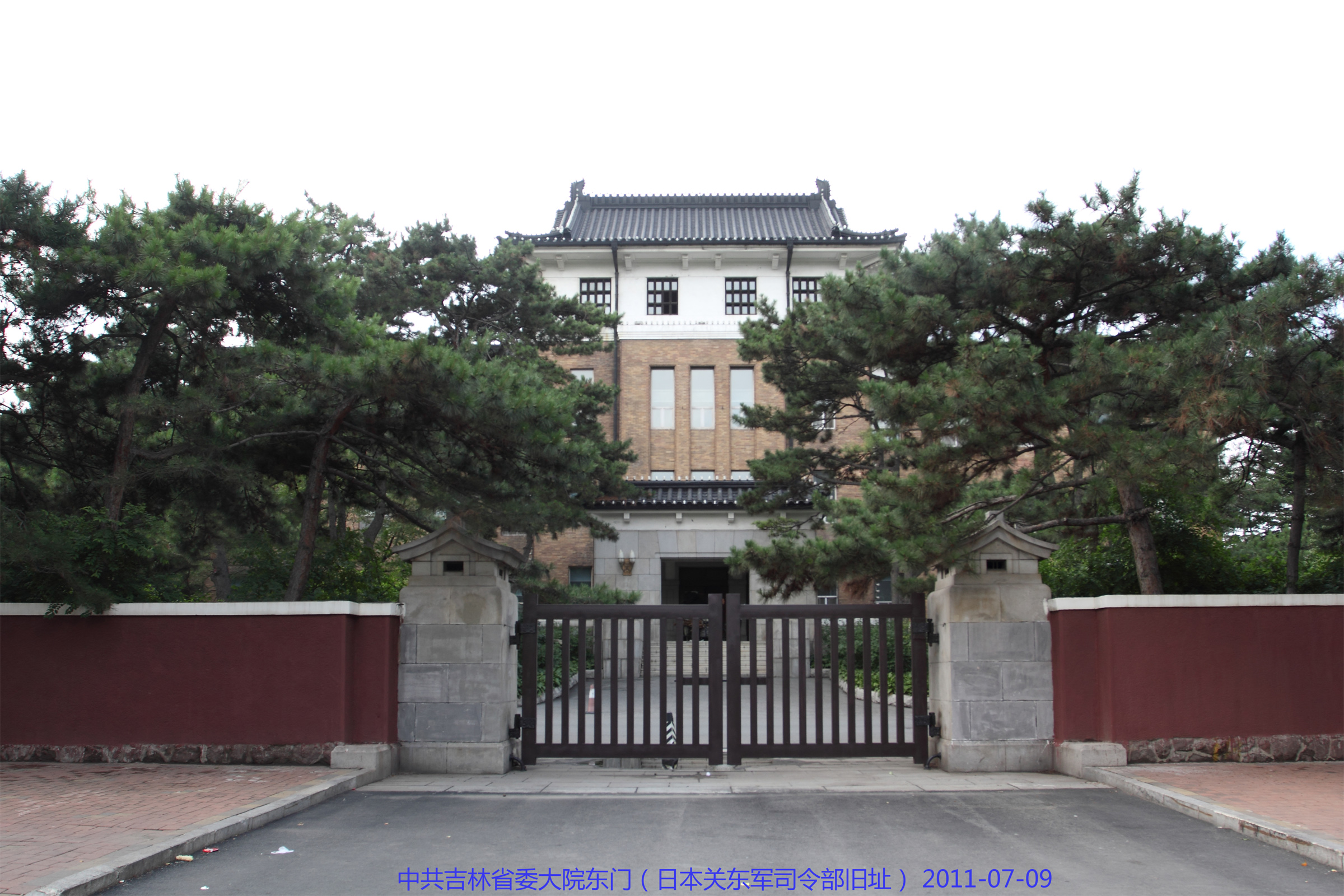
Headquarters of Kwantung Army, Xinjing. Currently used as the office of the Jilin Committee of the Chinese Communist Party.

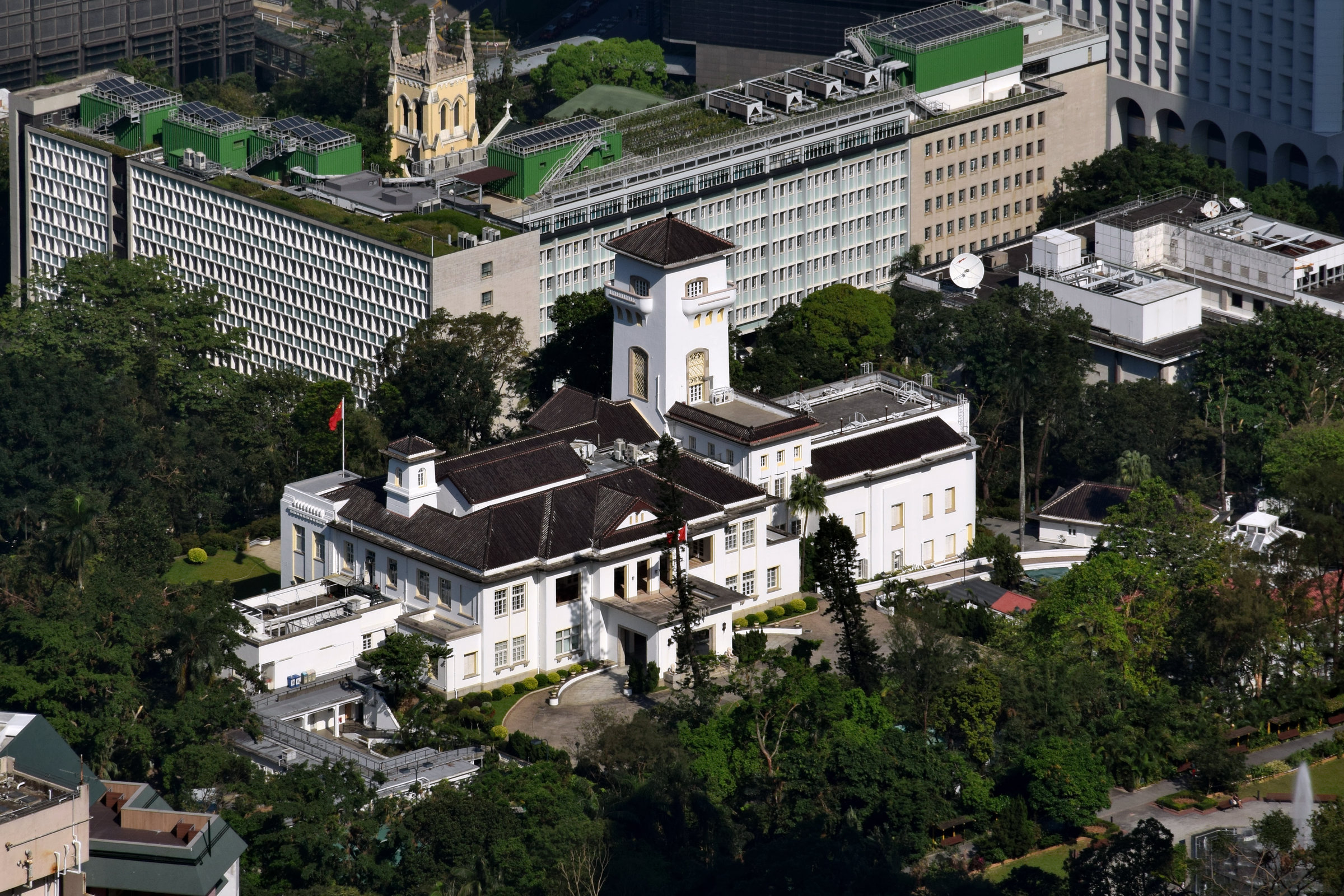
Government House, Hong Kong, reconstructed on the original roof in 1942 during the Japanese occupation

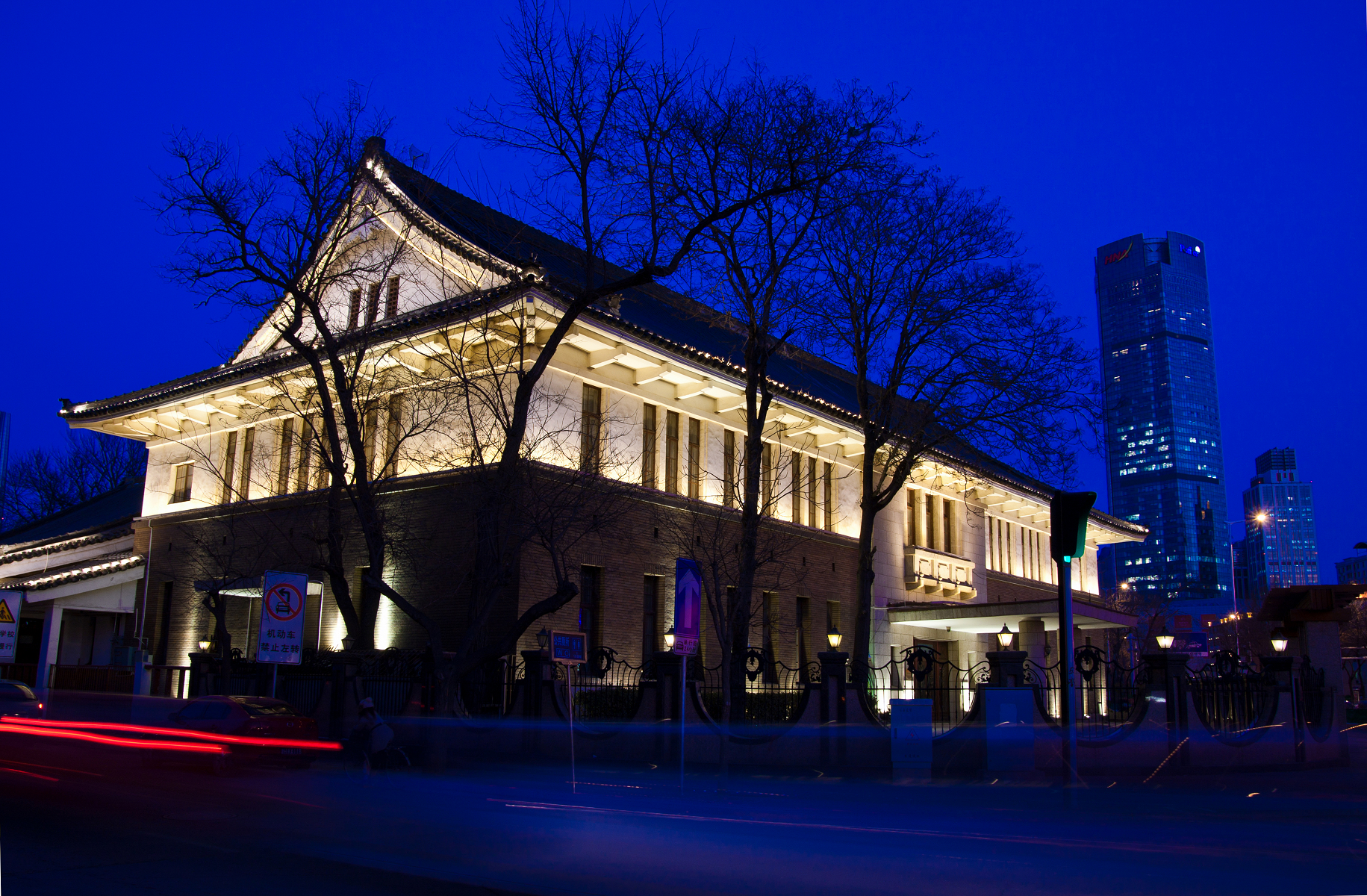
Butokuden, Tianjin

=== Russia ===
For a time, the area of Yuzhno-Sakhalinsk in Russia was part of the Japanese Empire known as Toyohara. Some Japanese buildings remain, including the Yuzhno-Sakhalinsk Museum, which is in the Imperial Crown Style.

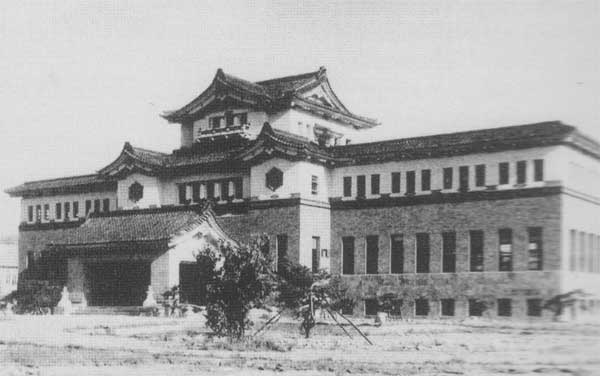
Sakhalin Regional Museum in Toyohara (c. 1937), by Yoshio Kaizuka

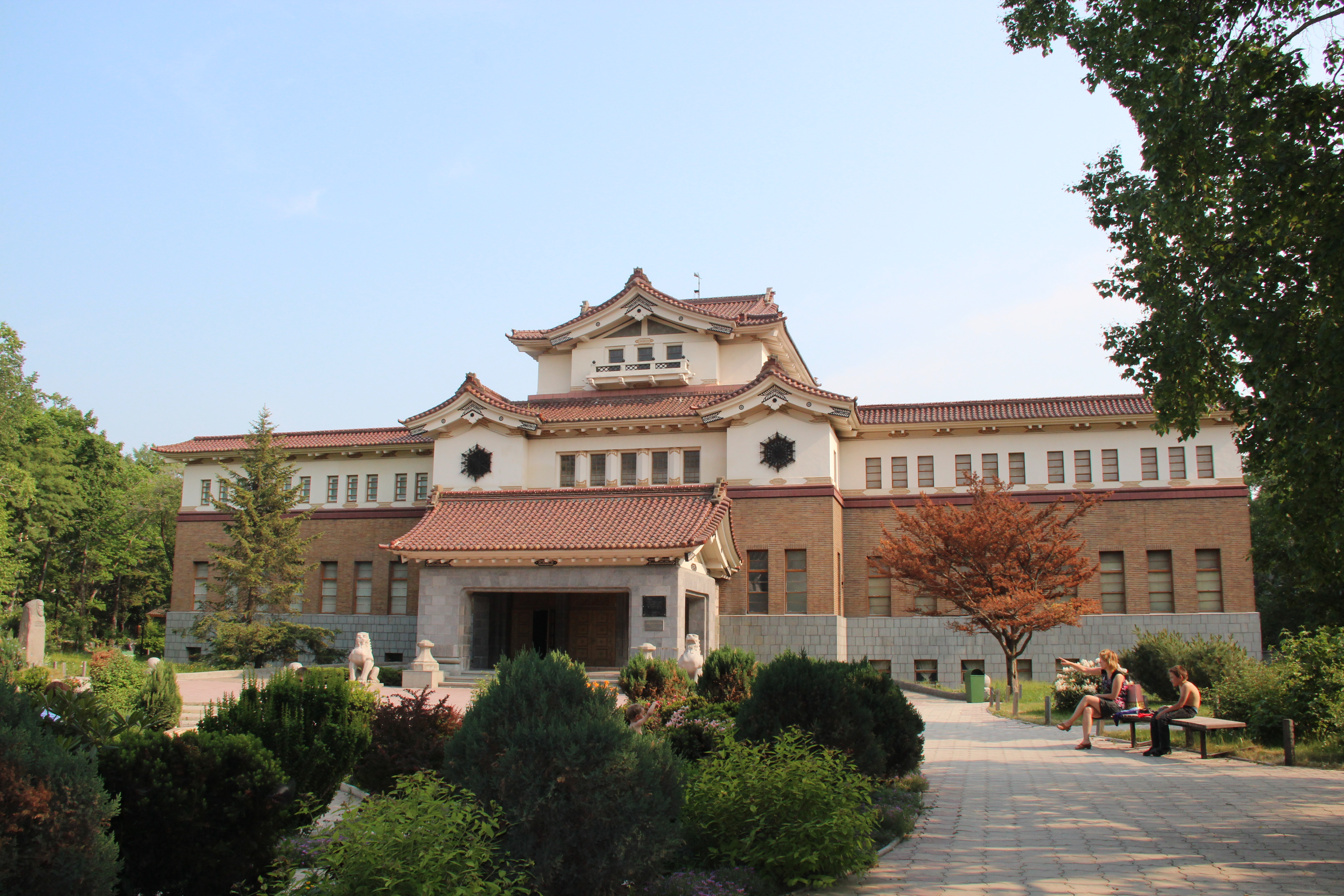
Yuzhno-Sakhalinsk museum in 2012

== See also ==
- List of architectural styles
- Giyōfū architecture
