= List of Taiwanese photographers =

This is a list of notable Taiwanese photographers in alphabetical order by last name.

== C ==
- Chang Chao-Tang (1943–2024)
- Chang Tsai (photographer) (1916-1994)
- Chien-Chi Chang (1961-)
- Chi Po-lin (1964-2017)
- Chou Ching-hui (1965-)

== D ==
- Deng Nan-guang (1907-1971)

== H ==
- Howard Huang (1972-)

== K ==
- Ko Si-chi (1929-2020)

== L ==
- Lee Ming-tiao (1922–2013)
- Ann Li (businesswoman) (born 1995)
- TC Lin (born 1968)

== T ==
- Tzeng Chin-fa

== W ==
- Wang Hsin (born 1942)
- Wu Tien-chang (1956-)

== Y ==
- Yao Jui-Chung (1969-)
- Yonfan (1947-)

== See also ==
- List of Taiwanese artists
- Photography in Taiwan
