= Photography in Taiwan =

Taiwanese photography is deeply rooted in the country's unique and rapidly changing history. Its early photography is often divided into two periods: Pre-Japanese from approximately 1858 to 1895, and an Era of Japanese Influence, from 1895 to 1945, the year the Japanese rule of Taiwan ended. Many photographs from the period during which Taiwan was under Japanese rule have been preserved as postcards. Much of the pre-Japanese era photography was conducted by foreign missionaries (such as Scottish Presbyterian minister John Thomson) and merchants.

Chang Tsai (張才), Deng Nan-guang (鄧南光) and Lee Ming-tiao (李鳴鵰), collectively known as the "three swordsmen", are among the best known of the Taiwanese photographers who were active in the 1930s to 1950s. Chinese influence supplanted Japanese influence when the Nationalist government's formally took over Taiwan in 1945 and imposed its authoritarian rule. The lifting of martial law opened Taiwan's art scene, including its photography. Photographer Chang Tsang-tsang has said "the lifting of martial law and the repealing of bans on the establishment of newspapers and political parties in the late 1980s stimulated the domestic art scene and supported the diversification of photography in Taiwan."

Photographers International is considered one of Taiwan's leading photography magazines in 1990s(discontinued in 2014). The magazine profiled key Taiwanese photographers such as Chang Yung-Chieh (張詠捷), Wu Chung-Wei (吳忠維), Hsieh Chun-Teh, (謝春德), Ho Ching-Tai (何經泰), Chuang Ling (莊靈), Liu Chen-Shan (劉振祥) and editor Juan I-Jong (阮義忠) in an issue called "Taiwan Vision".

Another well-known Taiwanese photographer is Taiwan-born Chien-Chi Chang (張乾琦), a member of the Magnum Photos agency.

Another important influence comes from photographer Chang Chao-Tang (張照堂), who is considered by many to be the most important photographer in Taiwan after World War II.

== See also ==
- Cinema of Taiwan
- Culture of Taiwan
- Chien-Chi Chang
