= Yao Jui-Chung =

Taiwanese artist (b. 1969)

- 姚瑞中
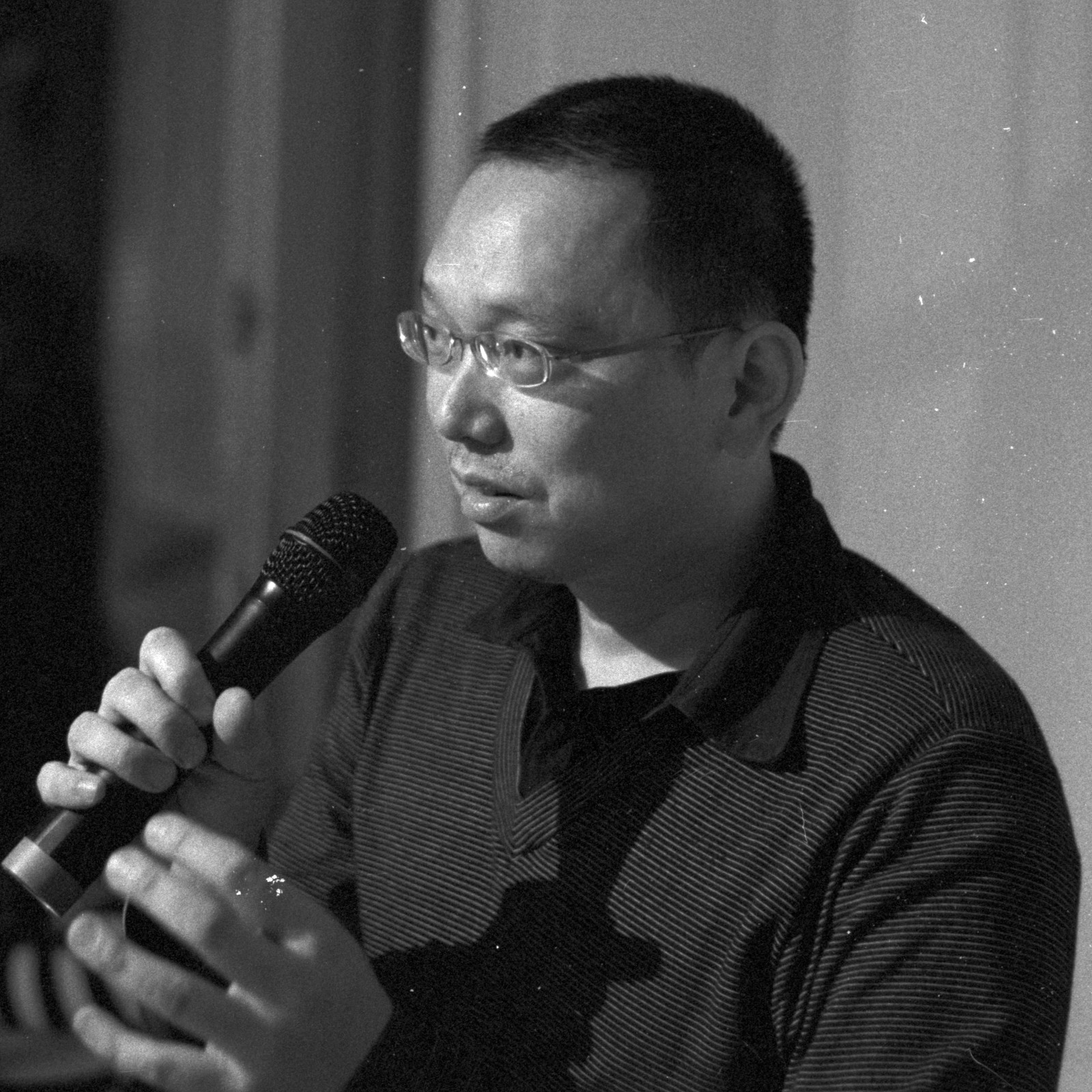
- Yao Jui-Chung in 2011
- Born: 1969 (age 56–57); Taipei, Taiwan
- Education: National Institute of the Arts
- Website: www.yaojuichung.com

Yao Jui-Chung (Chinese: 姚瑞中; pinyin: Yáo Ruìzhōng; born 1969) is a Taiwanese artist, writer, educator, and curator. Yao is considered a leading photographer and pioneer of contemporary art in Taiwan, whose work spans photography, painting, performance, and installation. Yao gained recognition after representing Taiwan at the Venice Biennale in 1997, and his work documenting abandoned public buildings has influenced government policy. The Yao Jui-Chung Archive of Taiwan Contemporary Art is housed at the Rose Goldsen Archive of New Media Art at Cornell University.

== Biography ==
Yao Jui-Chung was born in 1969 in Taipei, Taiwan. Yao's mother was born in Taiwan, while his father, Yao Dong-sheng, was a prominent literati figure, ink-wash painter, government official, and army officer from Changzhou, China, who joined the Kuomintang's retreat to Taiwan in 1949.

Yao studied at the National Institute of the Arts in Taipei from 1990 to 1994, graduating with a degree in art theory, after which he served for two years in the Air Force.

Yao Jui-Chung lives in Taipei and works as an artist and as an associate professor at National Taiwan Normal University.

== Career ==
Yao Jui-Chung was among the first generation of artists to emerge after the end of martial law in Taiwan in 1987. Following the first nativist movement in the 1970s, and the new wave of Taiwanese cinema and theater in the 1980s, artists in the 1990s took a more critical approach in their work. Artists such as Wu Tien-chang, Mei Dean-E, and Yao Jui-Chung focused on re-evaluating Taiwan's history, language, and local culture. The generation of so-called "New New Humans" raised on consumerism and pop culture prompted Yao's New Human Species manifesto, which called on young artists to become more self-aware by developing a 'new aesthetics' and 'identity consciousness'.

After early forays into figurative painting and collage, Yao abandoned these media in favor of photography, environmental interventions, and installation art. He embarked on a decades-long project Roaming Around the Ruins (1991–2011), photographing abandoned buildings, temples, and monuments around Taiwan. In 1992, Yao co-founded the theater collective 'Ta Na Experimental Group', and in 1994 he was the art director on Edward Yang's film A Confucian Confusion. In 1998, Yao published the book Beyond Humanity documenting ruins in Taiwan. In 2006, he co-founded the artist-run space VT Artsalon.

=== Action Series ===
Beginning in the mid-1990s, Yao created a series of works using satire to probe the absurdities of history, politics, and the Taiwan–China relationship. In 1994, Yao placed an advertisement in a local arts magazine proclaiming that he would "Attack and Occupy Taiwan," and proceeded to photograph himself urinating at various sites around the island associated with Dutch, Spanish, Japanese, and Chinese colonialism. From these performances he created Territory Takeover (1994), consisting of six gold-framed photographs hung above six gold-painted toilet bowls. The art critic Eric Lin has described this work as a "watershed moment" in contemporary art from Taiwan.

After China opened to tourists from Taiwan, Yao photographed himself hovering in mid-air in front of various Chinese monuments for the series Recover Mainland China (1994–1996). Other so-called "action" works include World is For All (1997–2000) which deals with the Chinese diaspora and Chinatowns around the world, Long March (2002) which re-visits locations of the Red Army's military retreat, as well as Liberating Taiwan (2007), which is based on military propaganda posters and features Yao dressed as a Chinese Red Army soldier floating in front of models of famous landmarks.

=== Taiwan Taiwan: Facing Faces ===
By the mid-1990s, international art fairs had become important venues for promoting Taiwan's identity as a democratic and tolerant society. Five artists were selected for the Taiwan Pavilion at the 1997 Venice Biennale, among them Chen Chien-pei, Lee Ming-tse, Wang Jun-jieh, Wu Tien-chang, and Yao Jui-Chung. The exhibition, titled Taiwan Taiwan: Facing Faces, included a range of mixed media, photography, digital art, and installations. Yao elected to re-install his 1994 work Territory Takeover, with a sculpture of a U.S. aircraft carrier as a new centerpiece, in reference to the 1996 Taiwan Strait Crisis.

=== Lost Society Documentation ===
After the 2000s, Yao stopped featuring himself as a satirical presence in his photographic works, but continued to photograph various ruins and religious sites. The series Long Live (2011) highlights abandoned military installations, Incarnation (2016–2022) documents religious statues, and Hell Plus (2018–2019) features instant film photos of Taoist or Buddhist dioramas depicting purgatory.

For a project titled LSD – Lost Society Documentation, Yao together with over one hundred students from local universities photographed some 300 so-called "mosquito halls" (abandoned public buildings) across Taiwan. The photos garnered significant public interest, and Taiwan Premier Wu Den-yih promised to address the issue. The results of the project were published in a book Mirage—Disused Public Property in Taiwan (2010–2016).

=== New Chinese Ink Art ===
Yao had started drawing with ballpoint pens while in the military, and created his first large-scale series of Biro drawings Beyond the Blue Sky (1997) while in residency at Headlands Center for the Arts in San Francisco. This and later series like The Cynic (2004) depict strange and demonic creatures and scatological motifs, and often employ wordplay and false cognates for political satire. The works proved controversial for certain audiences, and were once censored from the Shanghai International Art Fair in 2007, and from an exhibition at the Museum of Contemporary Art Taipei.

At an arts residency at Glenfiddich distillery in 2007, Yao began a series of drawings deconstructing Chinese Shan shui painting, using fine point oil pen on handmade paper with gold leaf to create colorful landscapes that include both contemporary and autobiographical elements. Yao has described this as a "turning point" in his artistic approach and as a "new Chinese ink art" that avoids traditional ink wash painting techniques and embraces "unrefined" or "vulgar" themes and local customs. The art critic Wu Chieh-hsiang has described Yao's technique in terms of its "unprecedentedly original methods."

=== Archive ===
The Cornell University Library's Rose Goldsen Archive of New Media Art, founded in 2002, houses the Yao Jui-Chung Archive of Contemporary Taiwanese Art. The collection includes Yao's artwork, donations of Taiwanese performance and video art, as well as 8000 digitized images of exhibition marketing materials that the artist has collected since 1989.

=== Exhibitions ===
Yao has participated in numerous international exhibitions as both an artist and curator. He has exhibited photographic work at the 2010 Taipei Biennial, the 2014 Venice Biennale of Architecture, Insert2014 in New Delhi, and the 2018 Shanghai Biennale. His biro and gold leaf pieces were featured in the Ink Remix exhibition at Canberra Museum and Gallery in 2015.

Yao's solo exhibition Republic of Cynic (2020) at Taiwan Contemporary Culture Lab featured video and installations touching on historical events from Apollo 11 to Tank Man. Yao curated the 2020 Taiwan Biennial, titled Sub Zoology, which examined human–animal relationships in religion, philosophy, art, and science.

== Awards ==
- 2013 Multitude Foundation Art Prize (Hong Kong)
- 2014 APB Foundation Signature Art Prize People's Choice Award (Singapore)
- 2017 Taishin Arts Award (Taiwan)
