= Pearl Consort =

Consort of the Guangxu Emperor

Imperial Noble Consort Keshun
- Born: 27 February 1876 (光緒二年 二月 三日)
- Died: 15 August 1900 (aged 24) (光緒二十六年 七月 二十一日); Forbidden City
- Burial: Chong Mausoleum, Western Qing tombs
- Spouse: Guangxu Emperor (m. 1889–1900)
Posthumous name
- Imperial Noble Consort Keshun (恪順皇貴妃)
- House: Tatara (他他拉; by birth); Aisin Gioro (by marriage)

Pearl Consort
- Chinese: 珍妃
- Literal meaning: Pearl Consort
Transcriptions
Standard Mandarin
- Hanyu Pinyin: Zhēnfēi

Imperial Noble Consort Keshun
- Traditional Chinese: 恪順皇貴妃
- Simplified Chinese: 恪顺皇贵妃
Transcriptions
Standard Mandarin
- Hanyu Pinyin: Kèshùn Huángguìfēi

Imperial Noble Consort Keshun (27 February 1876 – 15 August 1900), of the Manchu Bordered Red Banner Tatara clan, was a consort of the Guangxu Emperor. She was five years his junior. She was known to foreigners as the Pearl Consort. Legend has it that she was drowned in a well on the orders of Empress Dowager Cixi.

== Life ==
=== Family background ===
Imperial Noble Consort Keshun's personal name was not recorded in history.

- Father: Changxu (長敘), served as the Right Vice Minister of Revenue
  - Paternal grandfather: Yutai (裕泰), served as the Viceroy of Shaan-Gan in 1851
  - Paternal grandmother: Lady Gūwalgiya
- Mother: Lady Zhao
- Three brothers
  - Youngest brother: Tatara Zhaoxu (Father of Tan Yuling, Noble Consort Mingxian who married Puyi, Xuantong Emperor)
- Four elder sisters
  - Fourth elder sister: Imperial Noble Consort Wenjing (1873–1924)

=== Guangxu era ===
The future Imperial Noble Consort Keshun was born on the third day of the second lunar month in the second year of the reign of the Guangxu Emperor, which translates to 27 February 1876 in the Gregorian calendar.

On 26 February 1889, Lady Tatara entered the Forbidden City and was granted the title "Concubine Zhen". Her older sister, the future Imperial Noble Consort Wenjing, entered the Forbidden City at the same time and was granted the title "Concubine Jin". On 6 February 1894, Lady Tatara was elevated to "Consort Zhen".

Initially, Empress Dowager Cixi appreciated Consort Zhen's talents, and she hired top artisans to teach her to paint and play musical instruments. However, Consort Zhen urged the Guangxu Emperor to be "strong and independent", and encouraged his attempts to introduce political reforms and the teaching of foreign languages. It was also said that Consort Zhen liked photography, and she invited foreigners into the Forbidden City to teach her about photography. This explains the large number of extant photographs of Consort Zhen, an unusual occurrence for a consort. Her association with foreign customs, in addition to her peculiar habit of dressing in men's clothes, inspired disdain from Empress Dowager Cixi. Once, in response to her arrogant attitude, Cixi teased Consort Zhen by calling her "Grandmother Zhen".

Apparently, Consort Zhen also antagonised Empress Dowager Cixi when it was discovered that she had abused her influence over the Guangxu Emperor by interfering in regular procedures for civil appointments. The transactions became public in November 1894, during the First Sino-Japanese War, resulting in a series of embarrassing public scandals for the imperial court. In retaliation, on 26 November 1894, Cixi ordered Consort Zhen and Consort Jin to be demoted, and ordered the execution of a palace eunuch who collaborated with Consort Zhen. Zhirui, a cousin of the two consorts who served as an official, was banished from Beijing.

Consorts Zhen and Jin were eventually restored to their positions on 29 May 1895, but it seems that Consort Zhen was excluded from court functions by the middle of 1896. In 1898 she was placed under house arrest.

== Death ==
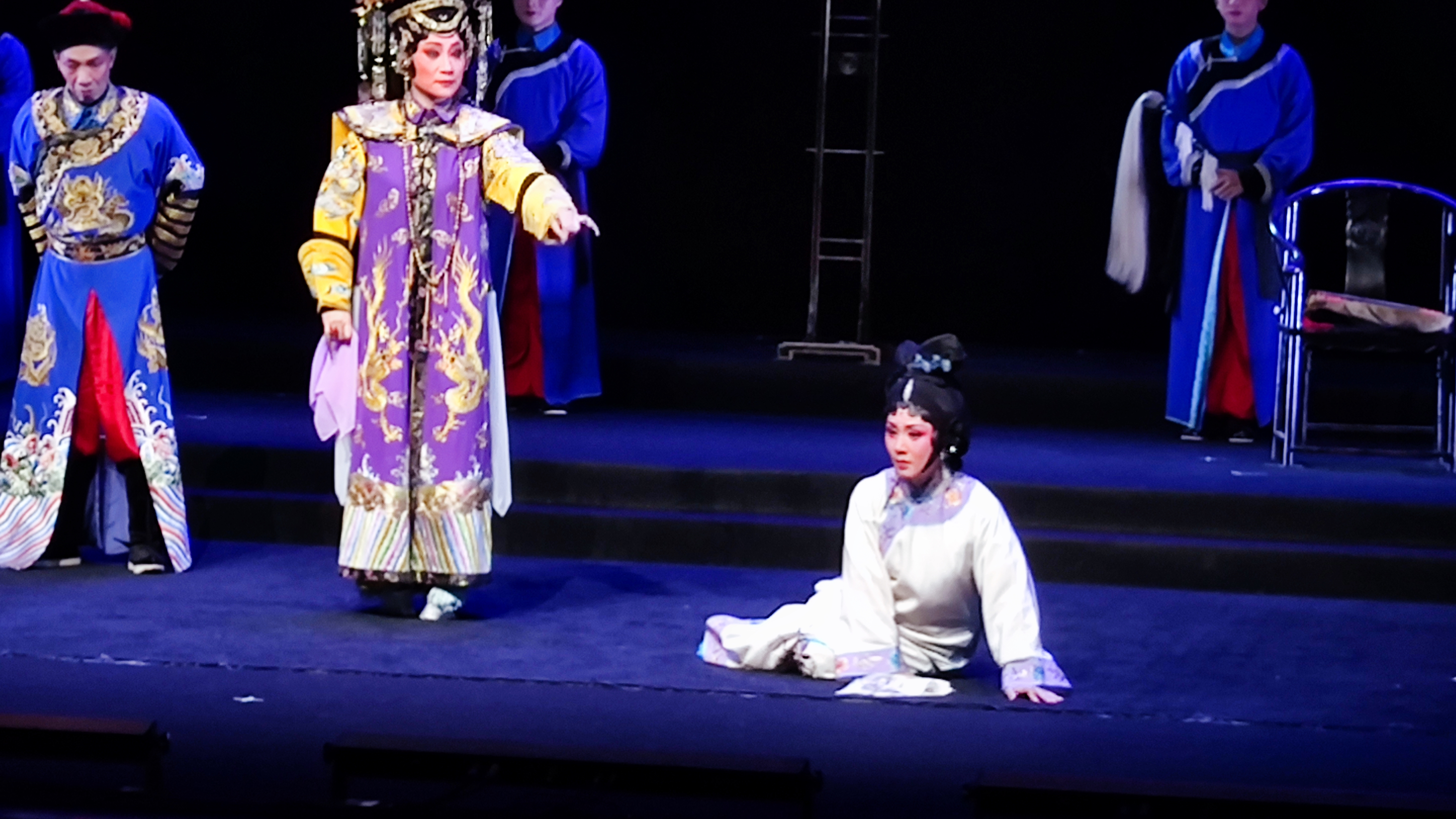
Consort Zhen's final moments as dramatized in this Cantonese opera.

During the invasion of the Eight-Nation Alliance in 1900, the imperial court fled from the Forbidden City to Xi'an. Around this time, Consort Zhen is believed to have drowned in a well in the Forbidden City.

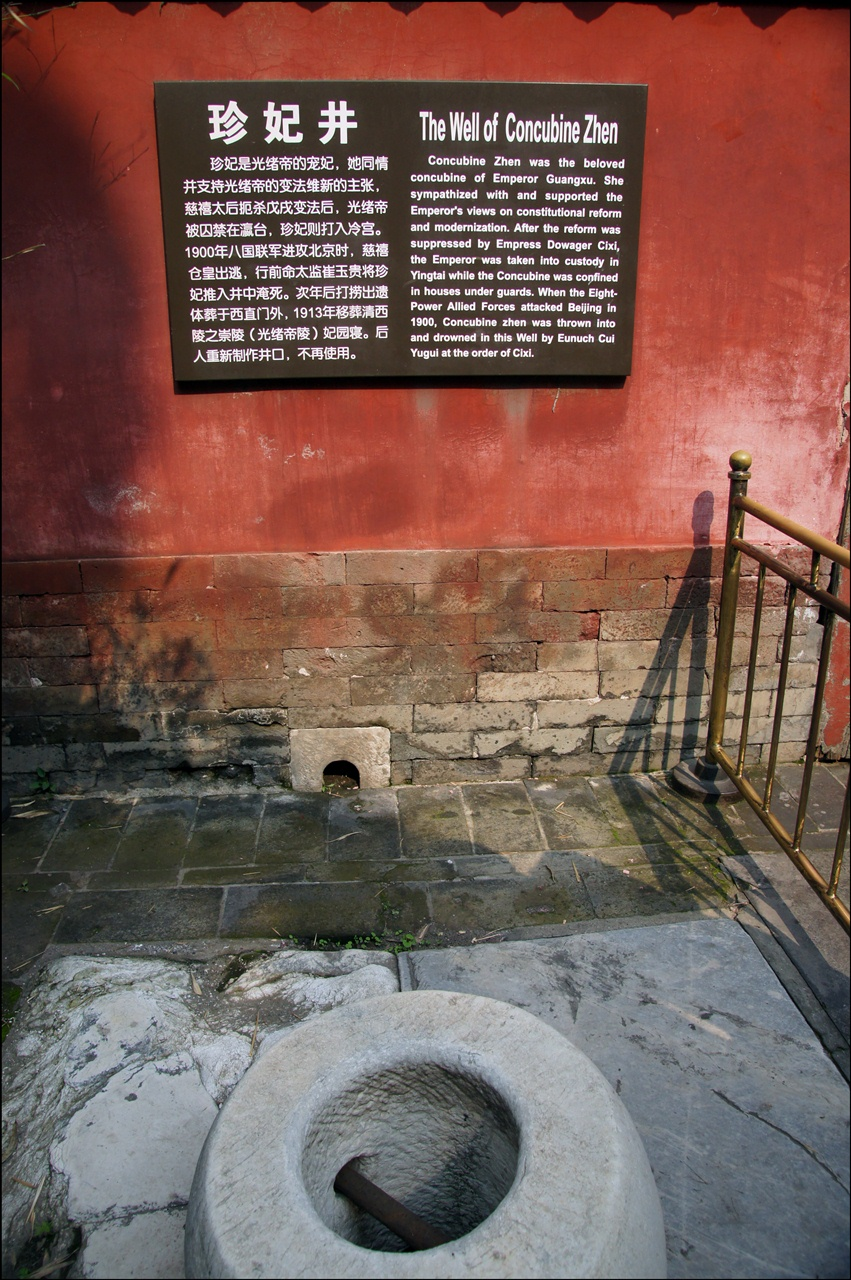
The well in which Consort Zhen supposedly drowned

Because many historical texts belonging to the Qing Court are missing or censored, the exact circumstances of Consort Zhen's death are unclear.

One particularly famous version of the events was described in the "Jianshan Diary" (a text that was allegedly written by a retired official). According to this account, Empress Dowager Cixi ordered Consort Zhen to be released from house arrest and brought in front of her. The empress dowager allegedly said, "I originally planned to bring you along with us. But you are young and pretty, and are likely to be raped by the foreign soldiers on the way. I trust you know what you should do." Realising that Empress Dowager Cixi meant to order her to commit suicide, Consort Zhen begged the empress dowager to allow the Guangxu Emperor to stay in Beijing and negotiate with the foreign powers. Infuriated with her, Empress Dowager Cixi finally ordered Consort Zhen to be thrown into a well behind Ningxia Palace in the northeastern part of the Forbidden City. Sir Reginald Johnston, tutor to the "last emperor" Puyi, was told a similar tale by palace eunuchs.

According to Sterling Seagrave, this dramatic story was invented by writer Edmund Backhouse, who was responsible for many of the myths about Empress Dowager Cixi and that Cixi had left Beijing before 14 August. Seagrave says Consort Zhen's fate is unknown, but it is possible that she "was done in by the eunuchs on their own initiative, or flung herself down the well."

== Titles ==
- During the reign of the Guangxu Emperor (r. 1875–1908):
  - Lady Tatara (from 27 February 1876)
  - Concubine Zhen (珍嬪; from 26 February 1889), fifth rank consort
  - Consort Zhen (珍妃; from 6 February 1894), fourth rank consort
  - Noble Lady Zhen (珍貴人; from 26 November 1894), sixth rank consort
  - Consort Zhen (珍妃; from 29 May 1895), fourth rank consort
- During the years of the Republic of China (1912–1949):
  - Imperial Noble Consort Keshun (恪順皇貴妃; from 24 April 1921), second rank consort

== In fiction and popular culture ==
- Portrayed by Zhou Xuan in Sorrows of the Forbidden City (1948)
- Portrayed by Siu Yiu in The Empress Dowager (1975) and The Last Tempest (1976)
- Portrayed by Xu Fan in Li Lianying: The Imperial Eunuch (1991)
- Portrayed by Jaime Chik in The Rise and Fall of Qing Dynasty (1992)
- Portrayed by Asiru in Towards the Republic (2003)
- Portrayed by Zhou Muyin in Happy Mother-in-Law, Pretty Daughter-in-Law (2010)
- Portrayed by Lemon Zhang in The Firmament of The Pleiades (2010)
- Portrayed by Xiaochen Wang in Legend of the Great Doctor: Xi Laile (2013)
- Portrayed by Rebecca Zhu in The Last Healer in Forbidden City (2016)

== See also ==
- Ranks of imperial consorts in China § Qing
- Royal and noble ranks of the Qing dynasty
