= The Arch (film) =

1968 Hong Kong film by Tang Shu Shuen

- Film poster
- Traditional Chinese: 董夫人
- Literal meaning: Madam Dong
- Hanyu Pinyin: Dǒng Fūrén
- Directed by: Tang Shu Shuen
- Written by: Tang Shu Shuen
- Produced by: Li Chiu-chung
- Starring: Lisa Lu
- Cinematography: Subrata Mitra
- Edited by: Les Blank; C.C. See
- Music by: Lui Tsun-Yuen
- Production companies: Film Dynasty; Cathay Asia Films
- Release date: 1968
- Running time: 95 minutes
- Country: Hong Kong
- Language: Mandarin

The Arch (Chinese: 董夫人) is a 1968 Hong Kong drama film directed by Tang Shu Shuen. The film was selected as the Hong Kong entry for the Best Foreign Language Film at the 42nd Academy Awards, but was not accepted as a nominee.

== Cast ==
- Lisa Lu as Madame Tung
- Roy Chiao as Captain Yang
- Szu-yun Chen
- Yu-Kuan Chen
- Hilda Chow Hsuan as Wei-Ling
- Po Hu
- Ying Lee as Chang
- Yui Liang as Monk
- Tang Shu Shuen

== Production ==
The Arch was loosely based on a short story by Lin Yutang. Tang developed the story a couple of years after graduating from the University of Southern California. As a wholly neophyte director with no credentials, Tang leaned on her connections to Jeanette Lin Chui, a friend and classmate of Tang's sister, to help circulate the script amongst the studios in Hong Kong. Eventually, she was able to book the Cathay Organisation film studio, who stipulated she use their roster of actors. In addition, Tang brought on fellow USC student Les Blank as editor, and was able to enlist the help of cinematographer Subrata Mitra through her friends' connections.

== Reception ==
Variety reviewed the film at the San Francisco Film Festival's "New Director Series" on 31 October 1968, describing the film as "a sensitively photographed, professionally-made story," and praising Subrata Mitra (also Satyajit Ray's cinematographer) as "exceptional."

== See also ==
- List of submissions to the 42nd Academy Awards for Best Foreign Language Film
- List of Hong Kong submissions for the Academy Award for Best Foreign Language Film
