= Chien-Chi Chang =

Taiwanese photographer (born 1961)

Chien-Chi Chang (Chinese: 張乾琦; born 1961) is a photographer and member of Magnum Photos.

== Life and work ==
Chang was born in Taichung, Taiwan. He received an MS from Indiana University, Bloomington and a B.A. from Soochow University, Taipei.

He joined Magnum Photos in 1995 and was elected as a full member in 2001.

He lives in Taichung, Taiwan, and Graz, Austria.

Chang focuses on the abstract concepts of alienation and connection. "The Chain", a collection of portraits made in a mental asylum in Taiwan, was shown at Venice Biennale (2001) and the São Paulo Art Biennial (2002). The nearly life-sized photographs of pairs of patients chained together resonate with Chang's look at the less visible bonds of marriage.

At São Paulo Art Biennial he was involved in the Thomann controversy.

Chang has treated marital ties in two books—I Do I Do I Do (2001), a collection of images depicting alienated grooms and brides in Taiwan, and in Double Happiness (2005), a depiction of the business of selling brides in Vietnam. The ties of family and of culture are also the themes of a project begun in 1992. For 21 years, Chang has photographed and videoed the bifurcated lives of Chinese immigrants in New York's Chinatown, along with those of their wives and families back home in Fujian. Still a work in progress, China Town was hung at the National Museum of Singapore in 2008 as part of a mid-career survey and at Venice Biennale (2011) as well as at International Center of Photography, New York (2012). Chang's investigation of the ties that bind one person to another draws on his own divided immigrant experience in the United States. In 2014, he was named one of the "30 Most Influential Photographers in Asia" by IPA. Other Taiwanese photographers who made the list included Chang Chao-Tang (張照堂) and Chang Tsai (張才).

== Awards ==
- 1998: Visa d'Or, Visa pour l'image, Perpignan, France
- 1998: Magazine Photographer of the Year, National Press Photographers Association, US
- 1998: Second prize, Daily Life singles, category, World Press Photo, Amsterdam
- 1999: First prize, Daily Life stories category, World Press Photo, Amsterdam
- 1999: W. Eugene Smith Grant, W. Eugene Smith Memorial Fund for Humanistic Photography, New York
- 2003: First place, Best of Photography Book (The Chain), Pictures of the Year International, US.

== Books and selected monographs ==
- Chang, Chien-Chi, The Chain, Photographs by Chien-Chi Chang. Taipei: Taipei Fine Arts Museum, 2001.
- Chang, Chien-Chi, I Do I Do I Do. Taipei: Premier Foundation, 2001. ISBN 957-97817-2-9.
- Chang, Chien-Chi; Lai, Cheryl, The Chain. London: Trolley, 2002. ISBN 0-9542079-5-5.
- Chang, Chien-Chi; Dowling, Claudia Glenn, Double Happiness. New York, NY: Aperture, 2005. ISBN 1-931788-56-1.
- Chang, Chien-Chi, I Grandi Fotografi: Magnum Photos: Chien-Chi Chang. Milan: Hachette Fascioli, 2008.
- Chang, Chien-Chi, Les Grands Photographe de Magnum Photos: Chien-Chi Chang. Paris: Hachette, 2008.
- Chang, Chien-Chi, Doubleness: photography of Chang Chien-Chi. Singapore: Editions Didier Millet and National Museum of Singapore, 2008. ISBN 978-981-05-9658-3.

== Video ==
- 2007: Empty Orchestra
- 2008: China Town I
- 2009: Escape from North Korea
- 2011: Burmese Days
- 2011: Bongo Fever
- 2011: China Town II
- 2013: AccessRH, Philippines
- 2014: Side Chain

== Selected exhibitions ==
- 1999 The Alternative Museum, New York City
- 2001 Taipei Fine Arts Museum, Taipei, Taiwan
- 2001 Venice Biennale, Venice
- 2002 São Paulo Biennial, São Paulo
- 2004 Southeast Museum of Photography, Daytona Beach, Florida
- 2004 Ffotogallery, Cardiff
- 2006 Columbus Museum of Art, Columbus, Ohio
- 2008 National Museum of Singapore, Singapore
- 2009 National Taiwan Museum of Fine Arts, Taichung
- 2009 Venice Biennial, Venice
- 2011 Museum of Cultures / Museum der Kulturen, Basel
- 2012 The Cube Project Space, Taipei
- 2012 Chi-Wen Gallery, Taipei
- 2012 International Center of Photography, New York City
- 2013 Museum of Contemporary Arts, Taipei
- 2013 Museum of National Taipei University of Education, National Taipei University of Education, Taipei

== Selected sound installations ==
- 2010 Many Voices of Immigrants, New York and Fuzhou, China
- 2013 Postcards from North Korea

== See also ==
- Taiwanese art

== General references ==
- Chang, Chien-Chi. Biography and works at Magnum website
- Chang, Chien-Chi. Asian journey: Taiwan: a vanished place. Time Asia, August 18–25, 2003.
- The Singular Approach: "Chien-Chi Chang's Contact Sheet Chronicle". Time, 2011
- Chang, Chien-Chi. China Town II (video). Museum der Kulturen, Magnum in Motion. Magnum Photos, 2012
