= The Last Tempest =

1976 Hong Kong film by Li Han-hsiang

- Film poster
- Traditional Chinese: 瀛臺泣血
- Simplified Chinese: 瀛台泣血
- Literal meaning: Ying Pavilion weeps blood
- Hanyu Pinyin: Yíng tái qì xuè
- Directed by: Li Han-hsiang
- Written by: Li Han-hsiang
- Produced by: Run Run Shaw; Zhou Duwen
- Starring: Ti Lung
- Cinematography: He Luying
- Edited by: Chiang Hsing-lung
- Music by: Frankie Chan
- Production company: Shaw Brothers Studio
- Release date: 21 February 1976 (Hong Kong)
- Running time: 118 minutes
- Country: Hong Kong
- Language: Mandarin

The Last Tempest (Chinese: 瀛臺泣血; pinyin: Yíng tái qì xuè) is a 1976 Hong Kong drama film directed by Li Han-hsiang. The film was selected as the Hong Kong entry for the Best Foreign Language Film at the 49th Academy Awards, but was not accepted as a nominee.

== Cast ==
- Ti Lung as Emperor Guangxu
- Lisa Lu as Empress Dowager Cixi
- Ivy Ling Po as Empress Xiaodingjing
- Siu Yiu as Consort Zhen
- Miao Tien as Li Lianying
- Wong Yue as Zhang Jinxi
- Lin Yun as Kang Youwei
- Yueh Hua as Tan Sitong
- Chen Ping as Consort Jin
- Shum Lo as Eunuch Wang Shang
- Ingrid Hu Yan Yan as Princess Der Ling
- Wong Sun as Yuan Shikai
- Yeung Chi-hing as Official Hsu Tung
- Wang Hsieh as Official Kang Li
- Chiang Nan as Official Tai Yi
- Ching Miao as Ronglu
- Lo Hol Pang as Yang Shenxiu
- Kong Ngai as Lin Xu

== See also ==
- List of submissions to the 49th Academy Awards for Best Foreign Language Film
- List of Hong Kong submissions for the Academy Award for Best Foreign Language Film
