= Tang Shu Shuen =

Film director

- Chinese: 唐書璇
- Born: 1941 (age 84–85); Hong Kong
- Other names: Cecile Tang Shu Shuen, Cecille Tong Shu-Shuen
- Occupation: Film director
- Years active: 1968–76

Tang Shu Shuen (Chinese: 唐書璇; pinyin: Táng Shūxuán; born 1941) is a Hong Kong film director, best known for her innovative films The Arch (1968) and China Behind (1974). Though her film career was brief, she was a trailblazer for socially critical art cinema in Hong Kong's populist film industry, as well as its first noted woman director, and one of the few Chinese women directors working in cinema during the 1960s and 70s.

== Early life and education ==
Born and raised in Hong Kong, Tang went to the United States for university after graduating from secondary school. She graduated from the University of Southern California. After graduation, she worked on advertising films in the United States.

== Family background ==
Tang is the younger sister of the late artist David Sheekwan (唐書琨), cousin of Hong Kong lyricist Susan Tang, and granddaughter of Yunnan warlord Tang Jiyao.

== Career overview ==
=== Early films ===
==== The Arch ====
The Arch (1968), one of Hong Kong's first art-house films, explores the subjugation of women and sexuality in a 17th-century Chinese village. The story centers on Madam Tung (Lisa Lu), a widow about to receive a chastity archway, who develops an unconsummated passion for Captain Yang (Roy Chiao), a houseguest also courted by her daughter (Hilda Chow Hsuen). The film highlights the tension between desire and duty within the rigid gender roles of traditional Chinese society.

The film is a visually striking work which blends Chinese traditions with European cinema techniques. The black-and-white cinematography features experimental elements like dissolves, superimpositions, and freeze frames. The international production team included actors from the US and Hong Kong, editor Les Blank, and cinematographers Subrata Mitra and Chi Ho-che.

When interviewed, Tang recalled the process of filming The Arch. "At the time, Hong Kong's film industry was dominated by the 'seven-day fresh' model (rushing production within ten days to cut costs), and The Arch's budget was similarly tight. The post-production phase faced numerous hurdles, and as a newcomer with few industry connections, she even had to assemble the rough cut herself. Fortunately, she later reconnected with a professor from her film studies, who helped her enlist the support of renowned figures like American director Les Blank for editing. The final film employed groundbreaking editing techniques—repetitive actions, dissolves, superimpositions—that left audiences in awe. Its avant-garde narrative style and cinematography pushed boundaries even further."

Following screenings at the Cannes Directors' Fortnight and Locarno in 1969, the film experienced successful art-house distribution in France. For its 1970 Hong Kong release, it was reprinted in colour with Mandarin dubbing and Chinese subtitles, though its theatrical run was brief due to conservative distribution practices. The film earned four Golden Horse Awards in Taiwan in 1971.

The film was selected in 2005 and 2011 as one of the "100 Best Chinese-Language Films" by the Hong Kong Film Awards, and as one of the "Top 100 Greatest Chinese-Language Films" by the Taipei Golden Horse Film Festival Executive Committee.

==== China Behind ====
China Behind (1974), influenced by the French New Wave, stands apart from the martial arts films and melodramas which predominated in Hong Kong during the '70s. It follows the harrowing journey of a group of medical students attempting to escape the turmoil of communist China during the Cultural Revolution. The film’s linear narrative incorporates historical footage and a restrained visual style, including non‑professional actors, to underscore the psychological trauma of its characters. Its bleak portrait of communist China and its final condemnation of capitalist Hong Kong brought upon it a thirteen-year ban by the British colonial authorities; the film premiered in France in 1975. China Behind was later recognized as one of the “Best 100 Chinese Motion Pictures” by the Hong Kong Film Awards.

==== Sup Sap Bup Dup (1975) ====
Sup Sap Bup Dup, directed and written by Tang, was released in Hong Kong on 18 September 1975. The film comprises a mosaic-like anthology of 11 short stories, focused on mahjong as a central theme. It features a diverse range of characters and includes spoken Cantonese, Mandarin, Shanghainese, English, Italian, and Japanese, reflecting Hong Kong's multicultural environment.

==== The Hong Kong Tycoon (1979) ====
The Hong Kong Tycoon is a 1979 Hong Kong drama film written by Wang Jingyi and Shi Si, and directed by Tang. The story is set against Hong Kong’s economic boom and follows a lower‑class man (Henry) who marries into a wealthy family and then pursues relationships with other women, blending comedy and social critique (with the first half having a comedic tone, the second shifting to realism). Held back for two years after its completion, the film was released in 1979 release to lukewarm critical reception and box‑office results.

== Post-film career and legacy ==
Tang launched Hong Kong's first serious film journal, Close-Up (大特寫), in 1976. It stopped publishing in 1979 (Bordwell, 2000), having published a total of sixty-six issues. This magazine gave birth to the later City Entertainment Magazine and served as one of the leading platforms for the Hong Kong New Wave movement.

She ceased filmmaking and emigrated to the United States in 1979, becoming a respected restaurateur in Los Angeles. Many critics, however, see her influence in the so-called Hong Kong New Wave of edgy, groundbreaking young filmmakers in the late '70s and early '80s.

In 1981, she served as screenwriter and producer for Peking Encounter, a Sino-American collaborative TV film, and traveled with the production team to Beijing for filming.

In 2012, Tang produced and wrote the English-language musical I, Ching, which was produced by Hong Kong theater company Theatre Space and performed in Los Angeles.

Filming Margins: Tang Shu Shuen, a Forgotten Hong Kong Woman Director examines Tang's work. The book analyzes why Tang's films have been marginalized in film historiography and discusses themes of gender discrimination and the tension between commercial and artistic cinema in Hong Kong's film industry. The author argues that Tang occupies an important yet systematically overlooked position in Hong Kong cinema history.

M+ completed a 4K restoration of The Arch in 2025 using two surviving 35mm prints from UC Berkeley Art Museum and Pacific Film Archive and the BFI National Archive. The digital restoration was performed by Silver Salt Restoration. The restored version was screened at the 2025 Cannes Film Festival's Classics section and subsequently shown at Tokyo Filmex and the Singapore International Film Festival the same year. Tang attended the Cannes screening and participated in related discussions about the film and its restoration.
