= Lai Cheng-ying =

Taiwanese cinematographer and film director (1931–2026)

- Born: August 29, 1931
- Died: April 18, 2026 (aged 94)

Lai Cheng-ying (Chinese: 賴成英; 29 August 1931 – 18 April 2026) was a Taiwanese cinematographer and film director.

== Life and career ==
Lai was born in Taichung in 1931 and began working for Agriculture Education Motion Pictures in the 1950s. After undergoing further training in color filmmaking in Japan, he returned to Taiwan's Central Motion Picture Corporation. Lai is regarded as a pioneer of color filmmaking in Taiwan and has won the Golden Horse Award for Best Color Cinematography in 1965, 1970, and 1972, for Beautiful Duckling, Stardust, and Execution in Autumn, respectively. When Lai began directing films, he hired Hou Hsiao-hsien as his screenwriter and assistant director. In 2022, Lai shared the Golden Horse Lifetime Achievement Award with Chang Chao-Tang. Lai died on 18 April 2026, at the age of 94.
