= Lisa Lu =

Chinese actress (born 1927)

- 盧燕
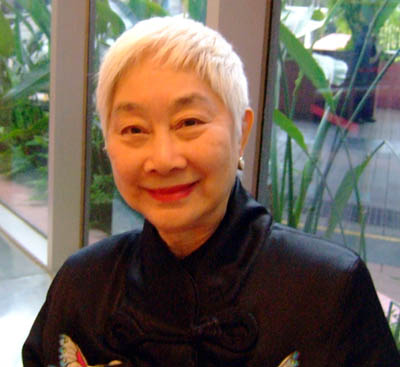
- Lu in 2007
- Born: Lu Pingxiang (盧萍香); January 19, 1927 (age 99); Beijing, Republic of China
- Citizenship: United States
- Occupation: Actress
- Years active: 1958–present
- Spouse: Shelling Hwong
- Children: 3, including Lucia Hwong
- Awards: Full list

Chinese name
- Traditional Chinese: 盧燕
- Simplified Chinese: 卢燕
Transcriptions
Standard Mandarin
- Hanyu Pinyin: Lú Yàn
Yue: Cantonese
- Jyutping: Lou^{4} Jin^{3}

Alternative Chinese name
- Traditional Chinese: 盧萍香
- Simplified Chinese: 盧萍香
Transcriptions
Standard Mandarin
- Hanyu Pinyin: Lú Píng Xiāng

Lisa Lu Yan (Note: simplified Chinese: 卢燕; traditional Chinese: 盧燕; pinyin: Lú Yàn) (born Lu Pingxiang (Note: Chinese: 盧萍香; pinyin: Lú Píng Xiāng); January 19, 1927) is a Chinese-American actress. She has worked extensively in Hong Kong, American, and mainland Chinese film and television since her debut in 1958. She won the Golden Horse Awards three times, twice for Best Leading Actress and once for Best Supporting Actress, in the 1970s. She is the only person who is a member of both the Hollywood Foreign Press Association and the Academy of Motion Picture Arts and Sciences.

On May 5, 2025, Lu became the oldest person to be honored with a star on the Hollywood Walk of Fame.

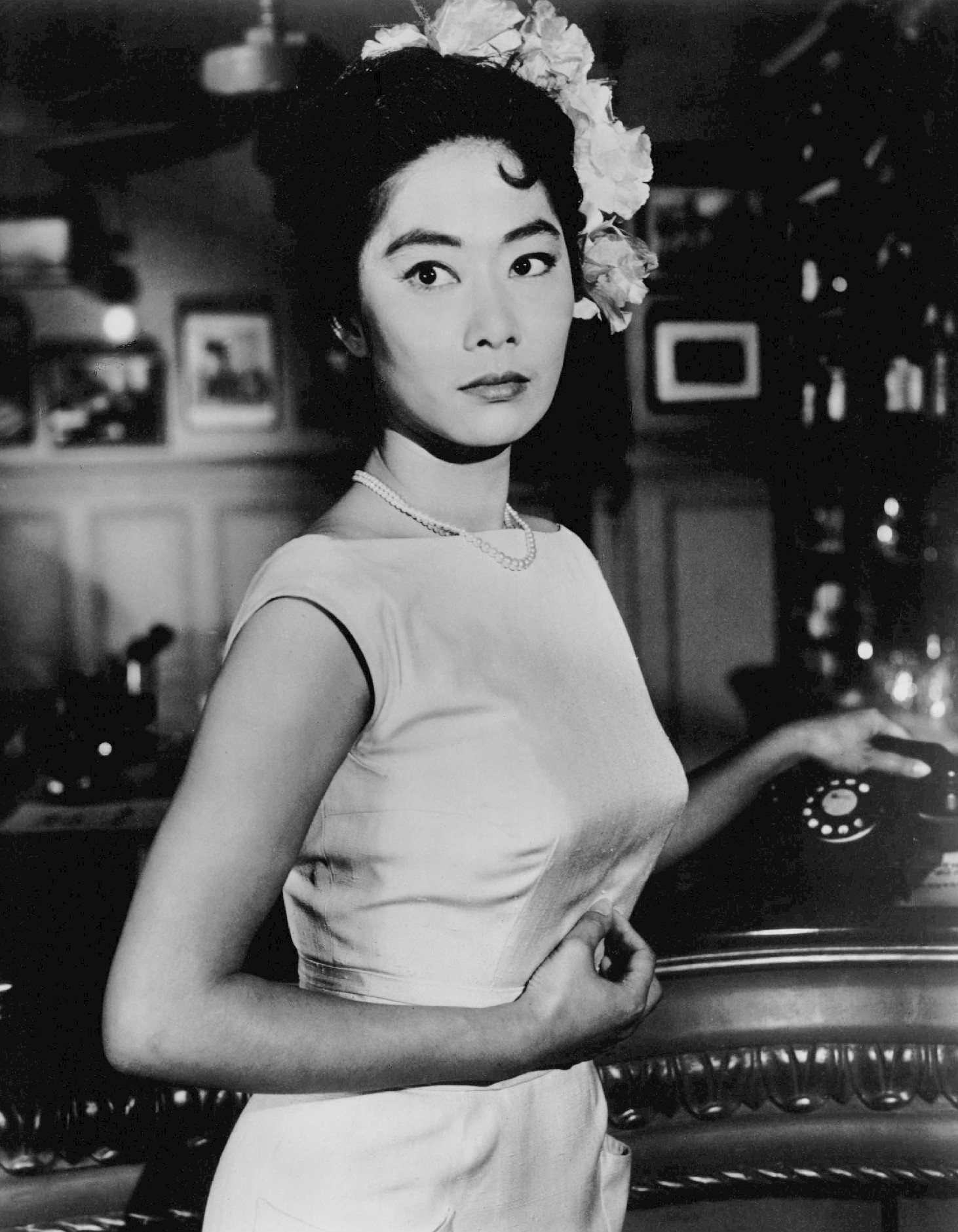
Lu in 1960

== Early life and education ==
Lu was born in Beijing in 1927, and was the adopted daughter of noted Chinese opera (Kunqu) performer Mei Lanfang. Her mother, Li Guifen, was also a Kunqu singer. Lu followed in her parents footsteps and began performing in Kunqu as a teenager. She attended a primary school run by English missionaries, and became adept in the English language from an early age.

In 1945 Lu attended St. John's University, Shanghai and Shanghai Jiao Tong University. However, her studies were interrupted by the Chinese Civil War and in 1947 she and her family immigrated to the United States. She studied financial management at the University of Hawaiʻi, as well as drama and speech. During her studies, she worked as an accountant, laboratory technician, radio announcer, and translator in Honolulu.

In 1956, Lu and her family moved to Los Angeles, and she joined the Pasadena Playhouse. She made her professional stage debut in 1958, in a production of The Teahouse of the August Moon.

== Career ==
During the 1958–59 television season, she had a recurring role as Miss Mandarin on the cult western show Yancy Derringer, set in New Orleans in 1868. In 1961 she had a recurring role as "Hey Girl" on the television series Have Gun – Will Travel. She made numerous other appearances on television, with guest starring roles on Bonanza, The Big Valley, The Richard Boone Show, The Virginian, Hawaiian Eye, The Rebel, Cheyenne, Bat Masterson, Kentucky Jones, and other shows.

In 1960, she was the female lead in the antiwar film The Mountain Road, which starred James Stewart and which was based on the novel of the same name by the China war correspondent Theodore H. White. Her film career took off in the 1970s with supporting roles in films like Demon Seed and Peter Bogdanovich's Saint Jack. During this time she achieved prominence in the Mandarin-language Hong Kong film industry, winning two Best Actress Golden Horse Awards for the films The 14 Amazons and The Last Tempest.

She became known during this time for playing the Qing Empress Dowager Cixi, in The Empress Dowager and The Last Tempest, which would become her signature role. Years later, she would play the same character in the Best Picture Oscar-winning film The Last Emperor (1987) and the Chinese television series Qianlong Dynasty.

For the remainder of her career, Lu alternated between theatre and film. She may be best known by English-speaking audiences for her roles in the 1988 TV miniseries Noble House, and the films The Last Emperor (1987), The Joy Luck Club (1993), and Crazy Rich Asians (2018).

Lu also attempted to popularise Chinese opera in the United States, touring universities and performing in English.

== Personal life ==
Lu was married to Shelling Hwong until his death in 1996. They had three children, including composer Lucia Hwong.

== Filmography ==
=== Film ===
Year	Title	Role	Notes/Ref.
1958	Panda and the Magic Serpent	Bai-Niang	
1960	The Mountain Road	Madame Sue-mei Hung	
1962	Rider on a Dead Horse	Ming Kwai	
1962	Womanhunt	Li Sheng	
1970	The Arch (董夫人)	Madame Tung or Madam Dong	Won—Golden Horse Award for Best Actress.
1972	The 14 Amazons (十四女英豪)	She Saihua	Won—Golden Horse Award for Best Supporting Actress
1973	Terror in the Wax Museum	Madame Yang	
1975	The Empress Dowager (傾國傾城)	Empress Dowager Cixi	Won—Golden Horse Award for Best Actress
1976	The Last Tempest (瀛台泣血)	Empress Dowager Cixi	
1976	The Star (星語)	Chen Lianyu	
1977	The Eternal Love (永恆的愛)		
1977	Demon Seed	Soon Yen	
1979	Saint Jack	Mrs. Yates	
1982	Hammett	Miss Cameron's Assistant	
1982	Don't Cry, It's Only Thunder	Sister Marie	
1983	Sewing Woman	Narrator	Short.
1986	Tai-Pan	Ah Gip	
1987	The Last Emperor (末代皇帝溥儀)	Empress Dowager Cixi	
1989	The Last Aristocrats (最後的貴族)	Li' mother	
1989	The Heroine in Northeast (關東女俠)	Yi Pinhong	
1990	Hiroshima: Out of the Ashes	Mrs. Sato	
1993	The Joy Luck Club	An-mei Hsu	
1993	Temptation of a Monk (誘僧)	Shi's Mother	
1994	I Love Trouble	Mrs. Virginia Hervey	
1998	Blindness	Mrs. Hong	
2000	Sworn Revenge (撞鬼你之血光之災)	Ling	
2002	Tomato and Eggs	Mrs. Wang	
2005	Beauty Remains (美人依舊)	Woman gambler	
2006	The Postmodern Life of My Aunt (姨媽的後現代生活)	Mrs. Shui	Nominated—Chinese Film Media Award for Best Supporting Actress
2007	Invisible Target (男兒本色)	Wai King-ho's grandmother	Cameo
2007	Lust, Caution (色，戒)	Mahjong partner of Aunt	
2009	Dim Sum Funeral	Mrs. Xiao	
2009	2012	Grandmother Sonam	
2010	Somewhere	Chinese journalist	
2010	Apart Together (團圓)	Qiao Yu'e	
2012	Dangerous Liaisons (危險關係)	Madam Du Ruixue	
2018	Crazy Rich Asians	Shang Su Yi	
2023	Rally Road Racers	Granny Bai	Voice role

=== Television ===
Year	Title	Role	Notes
1958	Have Gun - Will Travel - "Hey Boy's Revenge"	Kim Li	
1958-59	Yancy Derringer	Miss Mandarin	Recurring role
1959	Bachelor Father - "Peter Meets his Match" & "Peter Gets Jury Notice"	Linda Toy	Love interest for Peter Tong (Sammee Tong)
1960	The Rebel - "Blind Marriage"	Quong Lia	Played daughter of Quong Lee (Philip Ahn)
1960	Hawaiian Eye - "Jade Song"	Lin Ming	Appeared alongside George Takei
1961	Have Gun - Will Travel	Hey Girl	Recurring Role (Season 4)
1961	Bonanza - "Day of the Dragon"	Su Ling	Appeared alongside Philip Ahn, Benson Fong, Richard Loo, and Victor Sen Yung
1961	The Dick Powell Show - "Three Soldiers"	The Prisoner	
1961	Bat Masterson - "Terror of the Trinity "	Hsieh-Lin	
1962	Cheyenne - "Pocket Full of Stars"	Mei Ling	
1964	My Three Sons - "The Lotus Blossom"		
1965	Kentucky Jones - "The Victim"	Su Ling	
1968	Family Affair - "The Great Kow-Tow"	Betty Chang	
1968	The Big Valley - "Run of the Cat"	Chinese girl	
1970	Mission: Impossible - "Butterfly"	Mioshi Kellem	
1986	China Hand		
1988	Noble House	Ah Tam	
2001	NYPD Blue - "Fools Russian"		
2002	Qianlong Dynasty (乾隆王朝)	Empress Dowager Chongqing	
2011; 2012; 2015	General Hospital	Mrs. Yi	
2023	American Born Chinese	Ni Yang	Episode: "Rockstar Status"
2024	Death and Other Details	Celia Chun	

== Recordings ==
- The Reunion, a Peking Opera. with Lisa Lu and K.S. Chen, Lyrichord, 1972

== Awards and nominations ==
Year	Award	Category	Nominated work	Result
1970	8th Golden Horse Awards	Best Actress	The Arch	Won
1972	10th Golden Horse Awards	Best Supporting Actress	The 14 Amazons	Won
1975	12th Golden Horse Awards	Best Actress	The Empress Dowager	Won
2018	4th Annual Asian World Film Festival	Snow Leopard Life Achievement Award	Herself	Won
2019	9th The Asian Awards	Outstanding Achievement in Cinema	Crazy Rich Asians	Won
2019	Screen Actors Guild Awards	Outstanding Performance by a Cast in a Motion Picture	Crazy Rich Asians	Nominated
2025	24th New York Asian Film Festival	Vanguard Award	In recognition of works that has left an indelible mark on the history of cinema.	Won
2025	24th New York Asian Film Festival	Star Asia Lifetime Achievement Award	In recognition of works that has left an indelible mark on the history of cinema.	Won
2025	Hollywood Walk of Fame	Film	Herself	Honoree

== See also ==
- Golden Horse Award for Best Leading Actress
