= The Empress Dowager =

1975 Hong Kong film by Li Han-hsiang

- Film poster
- Traditional Chinese: 傾國傾城
- Simplified Chinese: 倾国倾城
- Hanyu Pinyin: Qīng Guó Qīng Chéng
- Jyutping: King1 Gwok3 King1 Sing4
- Directed by: Li Han-hsiang
- Written by: Li Han-hsiang
- Produced by: Runme Shaw
- Starring: Lisa Lu; Ti Lung
- Cinematography: Lam Chiu
- Edited by: Chiang Hsing-lung
- Music by: Frankie Chan
- Production company: Shaw Brothers Studio
- Distributed by: Shaw Brothers Studio
- Release date: 21 July 1975 (Hong Kong)
- Running time: 165 minutes
- Country: Hong Kong
- Language: Mandarin

The Empress Dowager is a 1975 Hong Kong historical film directed by Li Han-hsiang and produced by the Shaw Brothers Studio, starring Lisa Lu as Empress Dowager Cixi.

== Plot ==
Although the Empress Dowager Cixi of the Qing Dynasty had promised her nephew, Emperor Guangxu that he had complete autonomy, he found that this was not the case as he attempted to exert his authority over corrupt eunuchs and officials who undermined him with the backing of the Empress Dowager. Young, inexperienced and without a strong cadre of loyal officials to support him, he tries to juggle affairs both public and private. His loveless marriage to Empress Jingfen and dislike of the Empress further leaves him all the more bereft of any power lever. His only bright spark in a cold gloomy palace was his love for Concubine Chen and a young eunuch who wholeheartedly supports him.

== Cast ==
- Lisa Lu as Empress Dowager Cixi
- Ti Lung as Emperor Guangxu
- Siu Yiu as Consort Zhen
- Miao Tien as Eunuch Li Lianying
- David Chiang as Eunuch Ko Lien-tsai
- Ivy Ling Po as Empress Jingfen
- Tien Lie as Li Chieh
- Chen Ping as Consort Jin
- Shum Lo as Eunuch Wang Shang
- Cheung Ying as Tutor Weng Tonghe
- Ku Feng as Lord Li Hongzhang
- Hao Li-jen as Prince Gong
- Lee Pang-fei as Prince Shun
- Cheng Miu as Official Yung Lu
- Yeung Chi-hing as Official Hsu Tung
- Wang Hsieh as Official Kang Li
- Chiang Nan as Official Tai Yi
- Ching Miao as Ronglu
- Tin Ching as Cheng Yueh Lou
- Ouyang Sha-fei as concubine
- Law Bing-ching as Kiang governor's daughter
- Chan Si-gai as Kiang governor's daughter
- Wong San a court official
- Liu Wai as court official
- Wang Han-chen as court official
- Kong Yeung as court official
- Wong Ching-ho as eunuch in charge of conjugal record
- Tung Wai as eunuch
- Chan Mei-hua as lady in waiting
- Lau Nga-ying as lady in waiting
- Ofelia Yau as lady in waiting
- Yuen Man-tzu as lady in waiting
- Ling Hon as court official
- Gam Yam as court official
- Kwan Yan as court official
- Fuk Yan-cheng as court official
- Lui Hung as lady in waiting
- Yeung Kei as lady in waiting

== Awards ==
- 1975 Golden Horse Awards
  - Best Actress: Lisa Lu
  - Best Supporting Actress: Ivy Ling Po

== See also ==
- List of Asian historical drama films
