= China Behind =

1974 Hong Kong film by Tang Shu Shuen

- Film poster
- 再見中國
- Directed by: Tang Shu Shuen; Cheuk Pak-Tong
- Written by: Tang Shu Shuen
- Produced by: Chen Kuo-Liang; Shao Xin-Ming
- Cinematography: Chang Chao-Tang
- Edited by: Wong Yee-Shun
- Music by: Lam Lok-Pau
- Production company: Film Dynasty Productions
- Release date: 9 May 1974 (Hong Kong)
- Running time: 110 minutes
- Country: Hong Kong
- Language: Mandarin
- Box office: HK$1.939 million

China Behind (Chinese: 再見中國) is a 1974 Hong Kong drama film, directed by Tang Shu Shuen and Cheuk Pak-Tong. The film painted a bleak portrait of communist China and the desire to escape, yielding a thirteen-year ban by British colonial authorities, that was lifted in 1987.

The film was shot in Taiwan with official authorization, and the cinematography was done by renowned Taiwanese photographer Chang Chao-Tang (張照堂).

== Synopsis ==
The plot concerns four college students seeking escape to Hong Kong at the start of the 1966 Maoist Cultural Revolution in Mainland China.

== Reception ==
The film was selected as one of the "Best 100 Chinese Motion Pictures" during the 24th Hong Kong Film Awards ceremony on 27 March 2005. It was also selected for inclusion in Hong Kong Film Archive's "100 must-see Hong Kong movies" in 2011.
