= Asian Art Biennial =

Contemporary art biennial

Asian Art Biennial is a contemporary art biennial organized by the National Taiwan Museum of Fine Arts in Taichung, Taiwan. It was first launched in 2007 with the mission to "explore the multiplicity of perspectives that inform contemporary reality" in Asia, to "facilitate intercultural dialogues through art" and to "enhance understanding of cultural perspectives of Asia" and its dynamic artistic creativity. The Biennial's first two editions, in 2007 and 2009, were curated by the National Taiwan Museum of Fine Arts chief curator TSAI Chao-Yi. In the following years, curator of exhibitions Iris Shu-Ping Huang took on this role. The Biennial first invited guest curators for its 6th edition in 2017 and has been organized by curatorial teams of two or more curators from different countries and regions in Asia in its subsequent editions.

== History ==
- Have You Eaten Yet? 1st Asian Art Biennial, 2007
- Viewpoints & Viewing Points, 2nd Asian Art Biennial, 2009
- Medi(T)ation, 3rd Asian Art Biennial, 2011, curated by Iris Shu-Ping Huang
- Everyday Life, 4th Asian Art Biennial, 2013, curated by Iris Shu-Ping Huang
- Artist Making Movement, 5th Asian Art Biennial, 2015, curated by Iris Shu-Ping Huang
- Negotiating The Future, 6th Asian Art Biennial, 2017, curated by Kenji Kubota (Japan), Ade Darmawan (Indonesia), Wassan Al-Khudhairi (Iraq), and Hsiao-Yu Lin (Taiwan)
- The Strangers From Beyond The Mountain and The Sea, 7th Asian Art Biennial, 2019, curated by Hsu Chia-Wei (Taiwan) and Ho Tzu Nyen (Singapore)
- Phantasmapolis, 8th Asian Art Biennial, 2021, curated by Takamori Nobuo (Taiwan), Ho Yu-Kuan (Taiwan), Tessa Maria Guazon (The Philippines), Anushka Rajendran (India), and Thanavi Chotpradit (Thailand)
- How To Hold Your Breath, 9th Asian Art Biennial, 2024, curated by Fang Yen Hsiang (Taiwan), Anne Davidian (Armenia), Merv Espina (Philippines), Haeju Kim (Corea), Asli Seven (Turkey)
