= Chou Ching-hui =

Taiwanese artist and photographer

Chou Ching-hui (Chinese: 周慶輝; born 1965) is a Taiwanese artist and photographer.

== Biography ==
Chou was born in 1965 in Taiwan and graduated from the World College of Journalism in Taiwan.

Chou's interest in photography started in 1988. After completing military service, he has been a photojournalist in Capital Morning News, The Journalist magazine and China Times Weekly in Taiwan. Over these years, he received Taiwan’s annual Top Award in Photojournalism, Silver Medal in the Reportage category. A year later, Chou embarked on his first long-term photography project, "Frozen in Time – Images of a Leper Colony" which was exhibited at Taipei Fine Arts Museum in 1995. The following year, the exhibition was shown at the Tokyo Metropolitan Museum of Photography, and was recorded in Taiwan Photographers.

Every project that Chou created is fully related to social issues. He has received Independence Post Group Annual Taiwan News Award in Graphic Stories category, Golden Cauldron Prize, etc.

Chou's works have been exhibited at Taipei Fine Arts Museum (1995), the Tokyo Metropolitan Museum of Photography (1996), the Pingyao International Photography Festival, Pingyao, China (2002), the Guangdong Provincial Museum (2003), the Shanghai Art Museum (2003), the Guangzhou Photo Biennial (2008, 2009); and the Taiwan Biennial (2008).

Chou's Wild Aspirations – The Yellow Sheep River Project, a picture book series composed of computer images of children of the Yellow Sheep River Area, won the Red Dot Design Award in 2010 and the iF Communication Design Award 2011.

== Solo exhibitions ==
- 1995: Frozen in Time – Chronicle of a Leper Colony, Taipei Fine Arts Museum, Taipei, Taïwan
- 1997: Frozen in Time – Chronicle of a Leper Colony, National Ching-Hua University Arts Center, Hsinchu, Taïwan
- 2002:
  - Vanishing Breed – Workers Chronicle, Taipei Fine Arts Museum, Taipei, Taïwan
  - Vanishing Breed – Workers Chronicle, The 2nd Pingyao International Photography Festival, Pingyao, Shanxi, China
- 2004:
  - Vanishing Breed – Workers Chronicle, Quanta Building Hall, Taipei, Taïwan
  - Vanishing Breed – Workers Chronicle, Immersing in Art, Quanta Campus Tour Exhibition, Taipei, Taïwan
- 2009: Wild Aspirations – The Yellow Sheep River Project, Taipei Fine Arts Museum, Taipei, Taïwan
- 2010: Wild Aspirations – The Yellow Sheep River Project, Istituto degli Innocenti, Florence, Italy
- 2015:
  - Animal Farm, MoCA Taipei, Taipei, Taiwan
  - Animal Farm, ElsaArt Gallery, Taipei, Taiwan

== Group exhibitions ==
- 1989: Juan Yi-chung Darkroom Studio – Image Notebook, Jazz Photo Gallery, Taipei, Taïwan
- 1993: Eslite Six Photographers Exhibition, Eslite Gallery, Taipei, Taïwan
- 1995: Modern Taiwanese Photographers, Okinawa Photography Festival, Japan
- 1996: Frozen in Time – Chronicle of a Leper Colony selected for exhibition in Asian View – Asia in Transition photography exhibition, Tokyo Metropolitan Museum of Photography, Tokyo, Japan
- 1997: Executive director of Seeing the Native Son – Chronicle of Taiwanese Hakka in Shadow and Light, Chung Cheng Gallery, National Taiwan Arts Education Center, Taipei, Taïwan
  - Executive director of Taiwan Shiseido – Through the Years, Taipei, Taïwan
  - Women, Taipei City Government, Taipei, Taïwan
  - Portraits of Taiwan – Classic Chronicle of a Half Century of Faces, Taipei Photography Gallery, Taipei, Taïwan
- 1998:
  - Contemporary Taiwanese Photography group exhibition, NCP Photography Gallery, Hong Kong
  - Old-Taipei-People, Taipei City Government, Taipei, Taïwan
- 1999:
  - From Observing to Understanding – Modern Photographic Art from Taiwan 1990-99, Kuo Mu Sheng Foundation Art Center, Taipei, Taïwan
  - Industrious Taipei People group exhibition, Taipei City Government, Taipei, Taïwan
- 2000: Third Taipei International Photography Festival, Dr. Sun Yat-sen Memorial Hall Gallery, Taipei, Taïwan
- 2003: Humanism China – A Contemporary Record of Photography, Guangdong Provincial Museum, Guangzhou, China
- 2004: Humanism China – A Contemporary Record of Photography, Shanghai Art Museum, National Art Museum of China, China
- 2006:
  - Humanism China – A Contemporary Record of Photography, Museum für Moderne Kunst in Frankfurt, Staatsgalerie Stuttgart, Germany
  - Taipei – Views and Points, Taipei Fine Arts Museum, Taipei, Taïwan
- 2007:
  - Humanism China – A Contemporary Record of Photography, Museum of Photography in Berlin, Pinakothek der Moderne in Munich, Germany
  - Evolution, 2007 Guangzhou Photo Biennial exhibition, Guangdong Provincial Museum, Guangzhou, China
- 2008:
  - Humanism China – A Contemporary Record of Photography, Staatliche Kunstsammlungen Dresden, Dresden, Germany
  - Humanism China – A Contemporary Record of Photography, Edinburgh City Art Center, Scotland
  - Home, 2008 Taiwan Biennial exhibition, National Taiwan Museum of Fine Arts, Taichung, Taïwan
- 2009: Sightings: Searching for the Truth, 2009 Guangzhou Photo Biennial exhibition, Guangdong Provincial Museum, Guangzhou, China
  - Cultural Insights from Taiwanese Documentary Photography – Taiwanese Find Arts Series, National Taiwan Museum of Fine Arts, Taichung, Taïwan
- 2010: Four Dimensions – Contemporary Photography from Mainland China, Hong Kong, Taiwan & Macau, Hong Kong Arts Centre, Hong-Kong
- 2011:
  - Stories Developing - 10 Contemporary Photographers of Taiwan, Kaohsiung Museum of Fine Arts, Kaohsiung, Taiwan
  - Eye of the Times-Centennial Images of Taiwan, Taipei Fine Arts Museum, Taipei, Taiwan
- 2012: Into Society: Critical Realism in Taiwanese Photographic Arts since 1990, Kaohsiung Museum of Fine Arts, Kaohsiung, Taiwan
- 2013: Innovation&Re-creation, Selected Works from the National Taiwan Museum of Fine Arts Young Artist Collection, National Taiwan Museum of Fine Arts, Taichung, Taïwan
- 2014: The Great Acceleration , 2014 Taipei Biennial, Taipei Fine Arts Museum, Taipei, Taïwan
- 2015:
  - Changjiang International Photography & Video Biennale, Chong Ching, China
  - The Hidden Me: Self-Portraits, National Taiwan Museum of Fine Arts, Taichung, Taiwan
- 2016:
  - Animal Farm, Chini Gallery, Taipei, Taïwan
  - Animal Farm, La Galerie, Hong-Kong,

== Publications ==
- 1989: Juan Yi-chung Darkroom Studio – Image Notebook, Jen Chien Publishing
- 1995: Modern Taiwanese Photographers – Focus on Chou Ching-hui, Ascending Cultural Enterprises Publishing
- 1996: Frozen in Time – Chronicle of a Leper Colony collected in Vibrant Asia photography volume, Tokyo Metropolitan Museum of Photography
- 1998: Executive director, Seeing the Native Son – Chronicle of Taiwanese Hakka in Shadow and Light photography volume, Taipei Civil Affairs Bureau
- 2001: Executive director, New Taipei City Yingge Ceramics Museum pictorial notebook project
- 2002: Vanishing Breed – Workers Chronicle exhibition catalogue, Photographers International
- 2004: Out of the Shadows photo album (limited edition), Evermore International Publishing Corporation
- 2009: Wild Aspirations – The Yellow Sheep River Project photo album (limited edition), Taipei Fine Arts Museum

== Collections ==
- National Taiwan Museum of Fine Arts, Taichung, Taiwan
- Guangdong Provincial Museum, Guangzhou, China

== See also ==
- Taiwanese art
