= Chang Tsai (photographer) =

Taiwanese photographer (1916–1994)

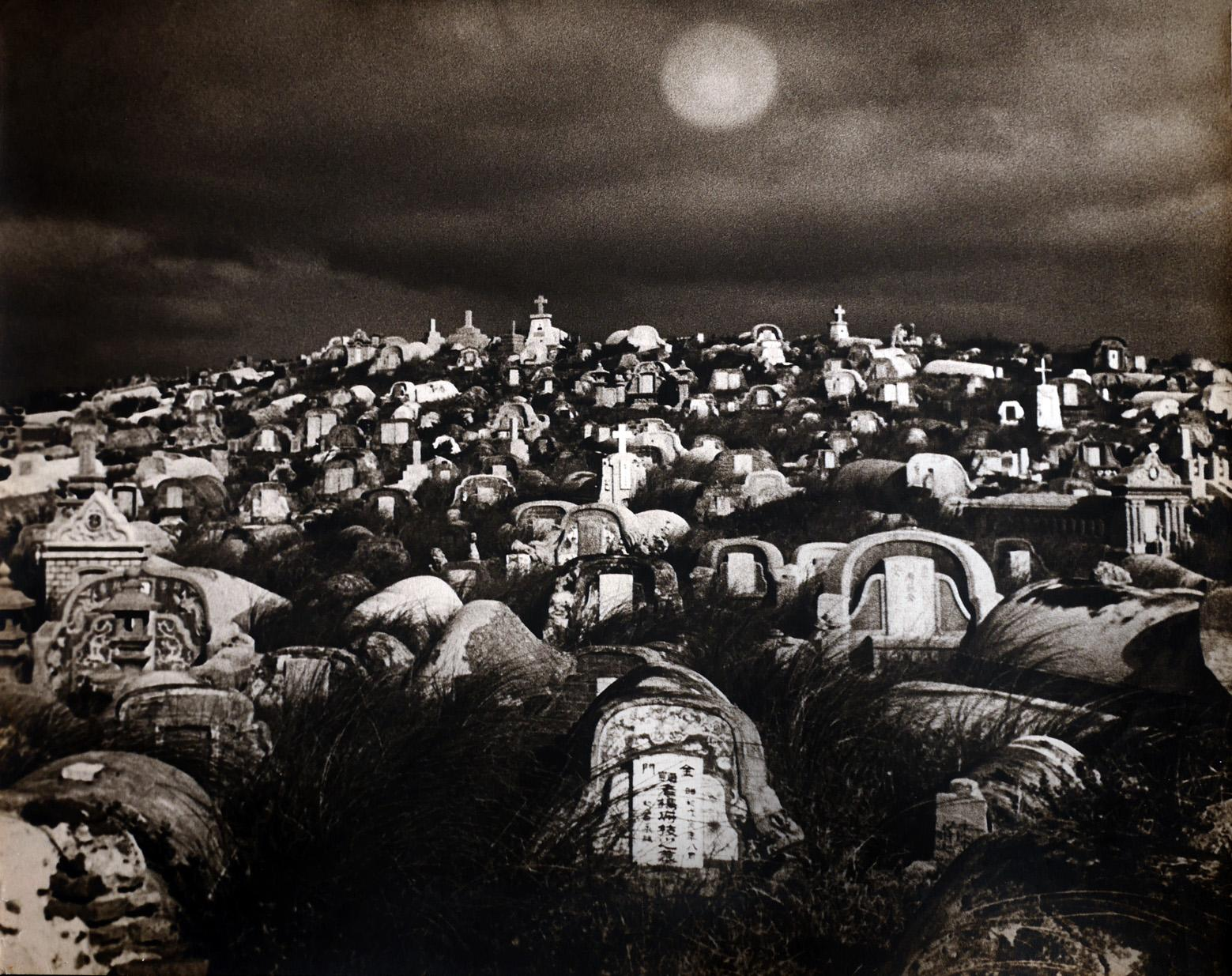
Tombs in Anping by Chang Tsai

Chang Tsai (Chinese:張才, 1916 – May 4, 1994) was a Taiwanese photographer born in Taipei's Dadaocheng district. In his youth, he was influenced by his older brother, Chang Wei-hsien (張維賢), and went to Japan to study photography. Chang was active during the 1930s to 1950s. In 2014, he was selected as one of the 30 most influential photographers in Asia by IPA (International Photography Awards).

== Life ==
Chang Tsai was born in 1916 in Taipei's Dadaocheng. He lost his father at a young age, and his elder brother, Chang Wei-Hsien, was a leader of the New Drama movement in Taiwan. In 1934, Chang followed his brother's advice and went to Japan to study photography. During his studies, he was inspired by the German Neue Sachlichkeit (New Objectivity) movement and developed an aesthetic of objective realism in his photography. In his youth, his works reflected a variety of themes, including humanism, social awareness, and cultural phenomena.

In 1936, Chang founded "Yingxin Xiecheng Studio (影心寫場)" in Dadaocheng District. In 1948, he held his first solo exhibition at Taipei's Zhongshan Hall. That same year, he won first place in a photography competition held by the Taiwan Shin Sheng Daily News (臺灣新生報) at Shanlun (沙崙), Tamsui. The photographers Deng Nan-guang and Lee Ming-tiao tied for second place, and the three of them were referred to as the "Three Musketeers of Photography (攝影三劍客)" or the "Three Fast Shutter Knights (快門三劍客)" by Huang Zexiu (黃則修), another prominent photographer.

1950s and Legacy

In the 1950s, Chang Tsai joined a field investigation of indigenous peoples with a professor of anthropology at National Taiwan University. He also photographed religious celebrations and Taiwanese operas, capturing the lives of indigenous peoples, the excitement of religious festivals in Taiwan, and the sorrow of opera performers behind the stage. His pioneering work in documentary photography in Taiwan set a new standard for the genre.

Chang Tsai died on May 4, 1994, at his home in Taipei. In 2014, he was named one of the "30 Most Influential Photographers in Asia" by IPA. Other Taiwanese photographers who made the list included Chang Chao-Tang (張照堂) and Chang Chien-Chi (張乾琦). Chang Tsai's photography from the 1950s includes precious historical images of the Sanxia Shrine celebration (三峽系列). In 2016, to commemorate Chang Tsai's centennial, the photography club of Chengfu Elementary School (成福國民小學) in Sanxia held an exhibition titled "A Century of Chang Tsai Meets a Century of Sanxia (百年張才巧遇百年三峽)" to pay tribute to Chang Tsai.
