= Deng Nan-guang =

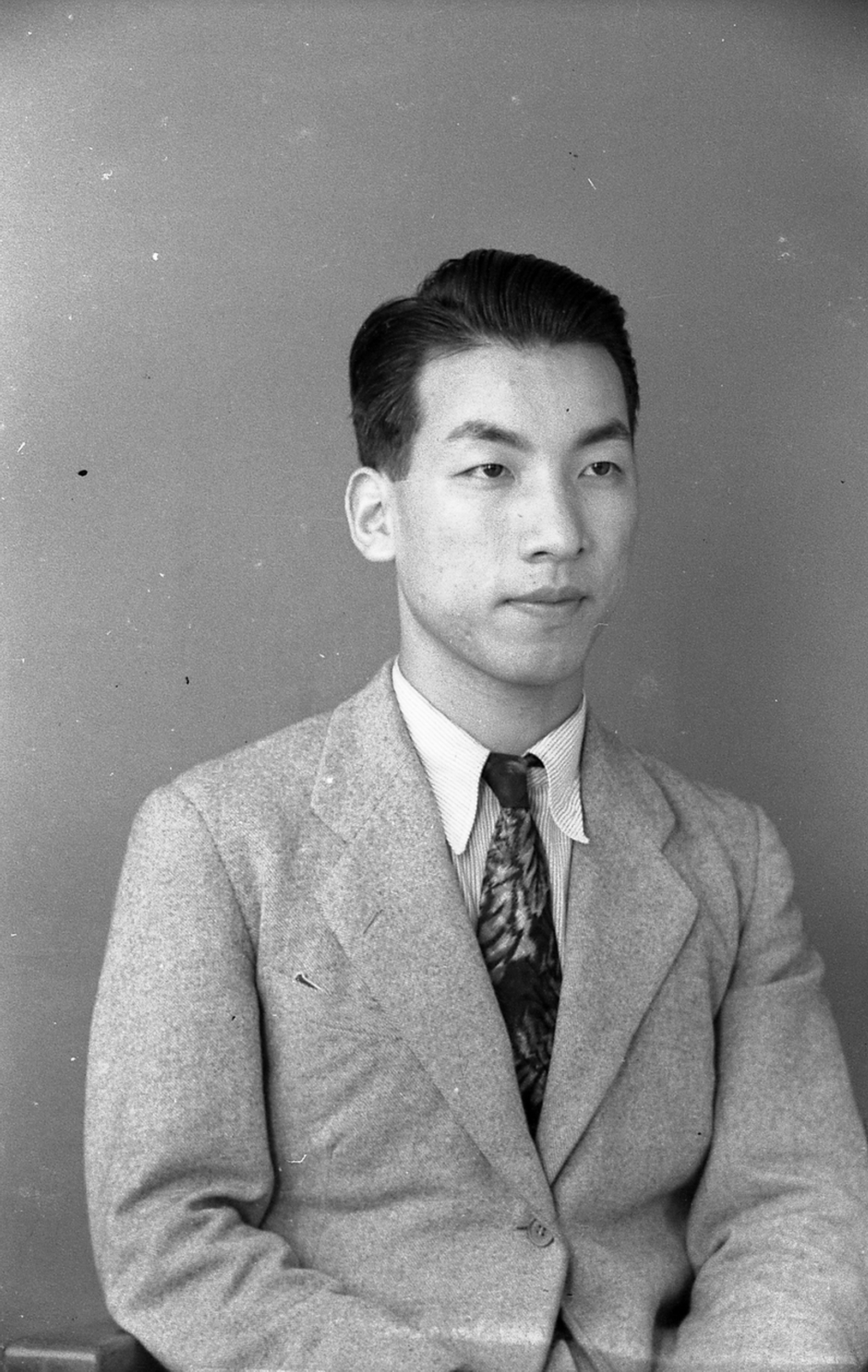
Image of Nanguang Deng

Deng Nan-guang (Chinese:鄧南光; December 5, 1907 – June 16, 1971), born Deng Teng-hui (鄧騰輝), was a Taiwanese photographer and a key figure in the early development of photography in Taiwan. From the Hakka community in Beipu, Hsinchu, he was born into the prominent Chiang (姜) family (also called XinChiang, 新姜). Deng is recognized as one of the pioneers of photography in Taiwan, and is often referred to as one of the "Three Musketeers of Photography," (攝影三劍客) alongside Zhang Tsai (張才) and Lee Ming-tiao (李鳴雕).

== Life ==
Photographer Zhang Zhao-tang (張照堂) described Deng Nan-guang's works as "full of romance and loneliness," with a simple yet impactful lens that directly touches the heart. Deng's photographic career is divided into three stages according to Zhang: the first being the pre-war scenes during his time in Japan, the second featuring images capturing the essence of Taiwan, and the least focusing on portraits and female character studies. Among these, his collection depicting the unique features of Taiwan stands out as particularly numerous.

== Early years ==
Born into the Chiang family in Beipu, Deng went to Japan for high school and university education at the age of 17. The influence of his uncle, Chiang Ruichang (姜瑞昌), who shared a passion for photography, likely contributed to Deng Nan-guang's love for the craft. While studying economics at Hosei University (法政大学), he joined a photography club, sparking his enduring interest in photography. His first camera was a Kodak Autographic Camera, a luxury item during that era, but his family's support, including the sale of jewelry by his mother Deng Wushunmei (鄧吳順妹), made it possible for him to indulge in his passion. Deng Nan-guang would carry the hefty camera to school every day, capturing moments and scenes around him.

During his university years, Deng Tenghui married Pan Qingmei (潘慶妹) from Xinpu, and together they moved to Tokyo. Deng's earliest work was accepted for publication in the Japanese magazine "Camera," marking the beginning of his growing interest in photography. His Leica-shot works were also selected for inaugural the Shanghai International Photography Exhibition. With diverse subject matter and frequent award-winning entries in competitions, Deng became a member of the All-Japan Leica Association and the All Kanto Student Photography Alliance. In 1932, his eldest son, Deng Shiguang (鄧世光), was born.

Influenced by the contemporary photography trends in Japan, Deng Nan-guang's aesthetics emphasized improvisation, freehand sketching, montage combinations, Solarization, and subconscious imagery—a departure from conservative and traditional pictorial photography. Residing in Japan, Deng Nan-guang was particularly influenced by the works and concepts of German photographer Paul Wolff and Japanese photographer Ihei Kimura. He embraced Kimura's idea that the camera should become an extension of one's body, functioning as an integral part of oneself, and becoming an extension of one's own eyes or mind.

== Middle and later years ==
In 1935, after Deng Nanguang obtained his bachelor's degree, he returned to Taiwan and opened a photographic materials store in Taipei's Beijing Street (京町, now Bao'ai Road, 博愛路) called "Nanguang Photo Studio." (南光寫真機店) Deng Shiguang recalled that his father initially used photo albums made of paper less susceptible to humidity store negatives, employing his own particle development technique, resulting in superior quality. Many of these negatives could be enlarged with the same level of detail. Because of this, enthusiasts referred to him as "Mr. Nanguang," and Deng Tenghui eventually adopted the name "Deng Nanguang."

In his "Nostalgia, Memory, Deng Nanguang," Zhang Zhaotang wrote that while managing the store, Deng Nanguang contemplated on how to find photographic subjects, how to implement realistic photography in Taiwan, and the means to becoming a recognized photographer. He chose to address these doubts through his actions.

As Deng's son noted, from 1935 to 1944, Deng reached the peak of his photographic career, capturing nearly six thousand negatives during his travels across Taiwan. The subjects include scenes from Taipei and Hsinchu streets, street vendors, the Beipu deity-welcoming parade, Hakka women doing laundry, tea leaf picking, lumberjacks cutting trees, charcoal burning, shepherds tending to their flocks, and prominent figures like Wu Hongqi (吳鴻麒) of Zhongli. Around 1938, Deng Nanguang developed an interest in 8mm films, shooting dozens of rolls, and he was recognized by the Japanese authorities as a registered photographer for the Taiwan Governor-General's Office. He also used an 8mm camera to film two dynamic works, "Fishing Trip" and "Zoo," featuring his children, which received awards. Both films were honored with the 8mm Film Award by the Japanese. Later, as World War II escalated, he closed the Taipei store and returned to his ancestral home in Beipu.

Zhang Zhaotang believed this period marked the pinnacle of Deng Nanguang's creative output. Using the camera as his pen, Deng created a visual diary, leaving behind many precious witnesses to the era in Taiwan.

After the war, Deng Nanguang returned to Taipei to reopen a photographic equipment store. In 1951, he was appointed as a photography advisor for the Taiwanese Cultural Association (臺灣文化協會). The following year, he established the "Free Exhibition Society," (自由影展社) organizing an annual photography exhibition. Deng actively contributed to the promotion of photography. In 1952, along with Zhang Cai and Li Mingdiao, he financially supported the Taipei Photography Monthly Competition. Later, the Taipei Photography Society took over, renaming it the "Taipei Photography Salon." This monthly competition and exhibition, judged by them, continued for a decade, mentoring many young photographers. Deng Nanguang, along with Zhang Tsai and Li Ming-diao, was collectively known as the "Three Swordsmen of Photography."

In addition, Deng Nanguang attempted several times to organize his photography group, but the requests were rejected by the Taiwan Garrison Command. Consequently, in 1953, he collaborated with friends to initiate an underground club named the "Free Exhibition Fellowship," (自由影展同人會) with regular meetings taken place in founding member's homes. The purpose was to break away from salon photography, promoting a simple and meaningful realistic style. Participants often brought lunchboxes, rode bicycles, and went to various suburban areas to take photos, earning them the nickname "Lunchbox Team." (便當隊)

Deng Nanguang maintained composure while photographing. When serving as a judge, he would tactfully express that poorly done works were "interesting" (生趣) in Hakka. He also ventured into capturing bold and open outdoor nude photography, featuring images of women from establishments like the First Hotel and North Hot Spring Tea House from Beitou.

During the 1960s and 1970s, conservative social atmosphere made it challenging to find models, even among ordinary women who were hesitant to be photographed. To capture female figures, Deng Nanguang often approached members of entertainment establishments. In 1965, he expressed disapproval of the picturesque salon advocated by Lang Jingshan (郎靜山), and he also discouraged images that exposed Taiwan's impoverished and backward aspects. Sending these photos abroad for competitions may indeed increase the chances of being selected, but it also makes them susceptible to being manipulated for the dissemination of malicious propaganda, which could potentially harm the reputation of the nation and its people. However, his unintentional 1956 photograph titled "Mengjia" (艋舺) featuring a richly-dressed woman and impoverished siblings became one of his most famous works, despite never being developed during his lifetime. This piece was selected for several exhibitions bearing his name, and it was included in various biographies.

In 1960, the Nanguang Photo Studio closed due to operational difficulties. Deng Nanguang went to work at the United States Naval Medical Research Unit 2 (NAMRU-2), responsible for medical photography. He self-published two books, "The Latest Camera Guide" and "Introduction to Photography." Simultaneously, in 1963, the Free Exhibition expanded into a nationwide social organization, renaming itself the "Taiwan Provincial Photography Association." Deng served as its president for seven consecutive terms until his death in 1971 due to heart attack.

== Legacy ==
In 2003, Chuan Huihua (全會華), the host of the Taiwan International Visual Arts Center (TIVAC), urged the government to establish a photography museum to preserve the extensive collections of original film negatives left by Taiwanese photographers such as Deng Nanguang, Zhang Tsai, Li Ming-diao, Lin Quan-zhu (林權助), Lin Shou-yi (林壽益), and Luo Xiang-lin (駱香林). Due to storage limitations, these invaluable visual assets faced the risk of deterioration and loss within three to four decades. Guan emphasized the urgent need for a photography museum to rescue Taiwan's irreplaceable visual heritage.

Deng Shiguang, Deng Nanguang's son, exhibited his father's works from the Showa era (1930s–1940s) at the Doi Gallery in Tokyo, showcasing pre-war scenes of Tokyo's Ginza, train stations, and amusement parks.

The family's Sei-Yuan Hospital (世源醫院) in Beipu has been transformed into the Deng Nanguang Image Memorial Museum. The museum periodically hosts courses in visual aesthetics and various events related to images. It officially opened to the public in October 2009, located at 15, Park Road, Beipu Township.
