= 10th Golden Horse Awards =

1972 Taiwan film awards ceremony

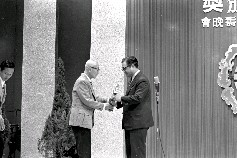
- "A Thousand Fakes and a Thousand Golds" won the "Outstanding Feature Film" award. Wen Yimin accepted the award on behalf of the film
- Date: October 30, 1972
- Site: Zhongshan Hall, Taipei, Taiwan
- Organized by: Taipei Golden Horse Film Festival Executive Committee

Highlights
- Best Feature Film: Execution in Autumn
- Best Director: Li Hsing; Execution in Autumn
- Best Actor: Ou Wei; Execution in Autumn
- Best Actress: Judy Ongg; Love Can Forgive and Forget
- Most awards: Execution in Autumn (5)

The 10th Golden Horse Awards (Chinese: 第10屆金馬獎) took place on October 30, 1972, at Zhongshan Hall in Taipei, Taiwan.

== Winners and nominees ==
Winners are listed first, highlighted in boldface.

**Best Feature Film**: **Execution in Autumn**; Indebted for Life and Love (runner-up); Fist of Fury (runner-up); Love Can Forgive and Forget (runner-up); The French Line (runner-up); The Water Margin (runner-up)	**Best Documentary**: Jiu Ye Zhi Lu (runner-up); Feng Yu Sheng Xin Xin (runner-up); Harvest (runner-up); Frogman (runner-up)
**Best Director**: **Li Hsing — Execution in Autumn**	**Best Leading Actor**: **Ou Wei — Execution in Autumn**
**Best Leading Actress**: **Judy Ongg — Love Can Forgive and Forget**	**Best Supporting Actor**: **Wei Su — The Widow Takes Revenge**
**Best Supporting Actress**: **Fu Pi-hui — Execution in Autumn**	**Best Screenplay**: **Chang Yung-hsiang — Indebted for Life and Love**
**Best Cinematography - Color**: **Lai Cheng-ying — Execution in Autumn**	**Best Film Editing**: **Peter Cheung — Fist of Fury**
**Best Art Direction - Color**: **Chan Seung-lam — A Touch of Zen - Part II**	**Best Sound Recording**: **Hung Jui-ting — The Widow Takes Revenge**
**Best Cinematography for Documentary**: **Chen Kuang-jui — Zhong Hua Min Guo Jing Ji Jian She Cheng Guo Zhan Lan**	**Best Planning for Documentary**: **Tuen Ping-yang — Liu Mei Zhong Guo Tong Xue Fan Gong Ai Guo Da Hui**
**Special Technical Award**: **Bruce Lee — Fist of Fury**	**National Spirit Award**: **Liu Mei Zhong Guo Tong Xue Fan Gong Ai Guo Da Hui**
