= Lee Ming-tiao =

Taiwanese photographer (1922–2013)

- Born: 1922; Daxi District, Taoyuan, Taiwan
- Died: 2013 (aged 90–91)
- Known for: Photography

Lee Ming-tiao (Chinese:李鳴鵰; 1922–2013), also known as Li Ming-diao and Lee Ming-diao, was a Taiwanese photographer. His work is held in the collections of the Kaohsiung Museum of Fine Arts and the National Taiwan Museum of Fine Arts and he had a retrospective exhibition at Taipei Fine Arts Museum in 2009.

== Life and work ==
Lee was born in Daxi District, Taoyuan.

He and fellow photographers Chang Tsai and Deng Nan-guang are known as the "Three Swordsmen of Taiwanese Photography" or "Three Musketeers of Photography". Active during the late colonial period and the Sino-Japanese War, they travelled throughout Taiwan, capturing "early Taiwan's rural culture, religious rituals, and social conditions." Lee's work mixes the styles of documentary and studio photography: street photography, as well as carefully arranged lighting and composition, and staged photography. In 1946 and 1947 he travelled all over Taipei, photographing bridges.

== Publications ==
- Lee Ming-Tiao Photography Retrospective. Taipei: Taipei Fine Arts Museum, 2009. ISBN 978-986-01-7190-7. Exhibition catalogue.

== Exhibitions ==
=== Solo exhibitions ===
- Lee Ming-tiao: Bridges of Taipei, National Center of Photography and Images, Taipei, Taiwan
- Lee Ming－tiao Photography Retrospective, Taipei Fine Arts Museum, Taipei, Taiwan, January–April 2009

=== Group exhibitions ===
- The View of Formosa's Landscape from Photographers, Taiwan Academy, New York, March–May 2015
- Tangible Times: Masters of Photography from the NTMoFA and NCPI Collections, National Taiwan Museum of Fine Arts, Taichung, Taiwan, December 2020 – February 2021. With Lang Jingshan, Deng Nan-guang, Chang Tsai, and Cheng Shang-Hsi.
- Crystalized Times: 2022 Centenary Memorial Exhibition of Photographers of Taiwan — Lee Ming-tiao, Dennis K. Chin, and Lin Chuan-tsu, National Center of Photography and Images, Taipei, Taiwan, December 2021 – April 2022

== Collections ==
Lee's work is held in the following permanent collections:

- Kaohsiung Museum of Fine Arts, Kaohsiung, Taiwan
- National Taiwan Museum of Fine Arts, Taichung, Taiwan
- National Center of Photography and Images, Ministry of Culture (Taiwan), Taipei, Taiwan
