= Imperial Noble Consort Wenjing =

Qing dynasty imperial consort (1873–1924)

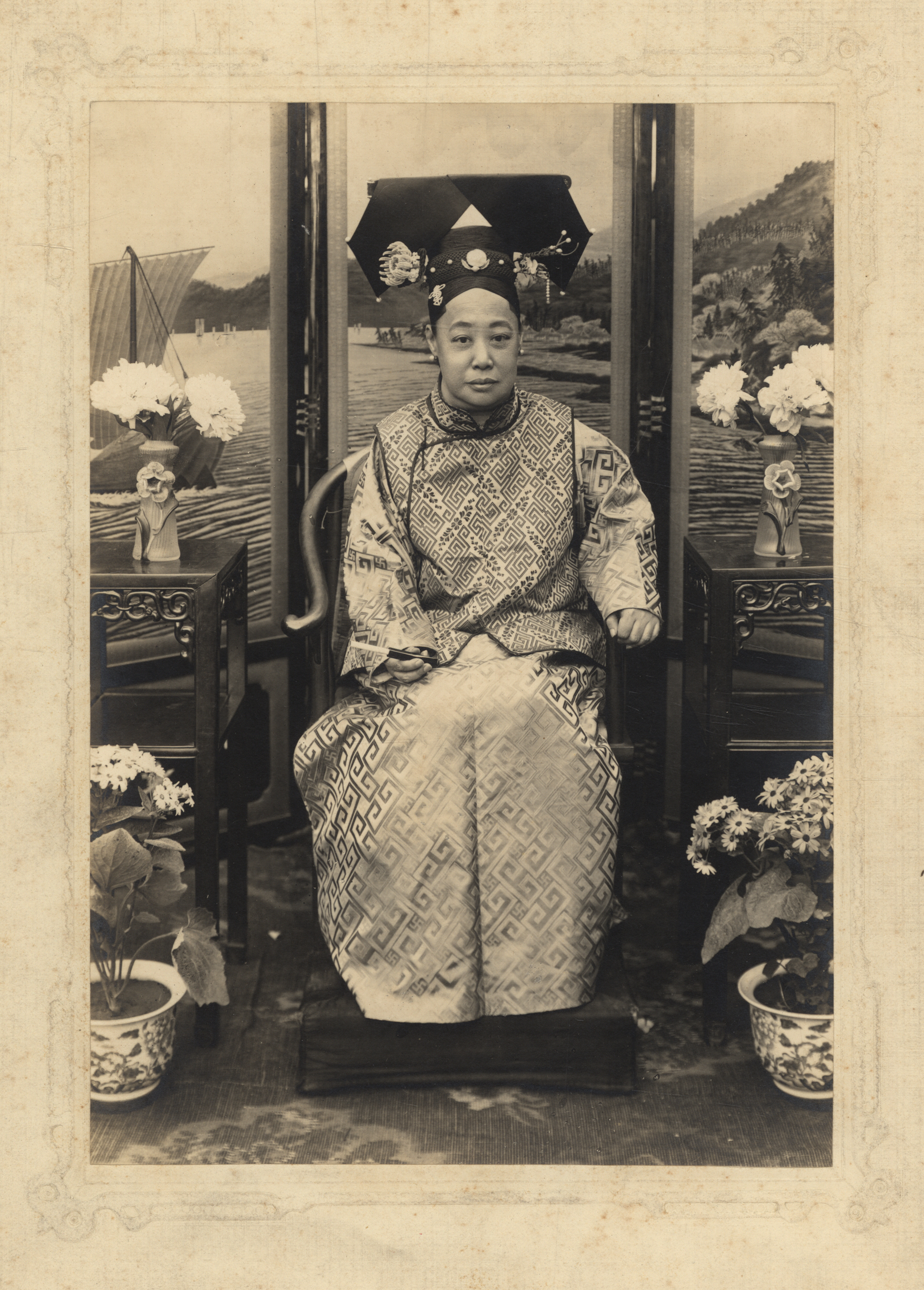
- Born: 6 October 1873 (同治十二年 八月 十五日)
- Died: 24 September 1924 (aged 50); Yonghe Palace, Forbidden City
- Burial: Chong Mausoleum, Western Qing tombs
- Spouse: Guangxu Emperor (m. 1889; died 1908)
Posthumous name
- Imperial Noble Consort Wenjing (溫靖皇貴妃)
- House: Tatara (他他拉; by birth); Aisin Gioro (by marriage)

Imperial Noble Consort Wenjing
- Traditional Chinese: 溫靖皇貴妃
- Simplified Chinese: 温靖皇贵妃
Transcriptions
Standard Mandarin
- Hanyu Pinyin: Wēnjìng Huángguìfēi

Imperial Noble Consort Wenjing, also known as Dowager Imperial Noble Consort Duankang (6 October 1873 – 24 September 1924), of the Manchu Bordered Red Banner Tatara clan, was a consort of the Guangxu Emperor (Emperor Dezong, the penultimate monarch of the Qing dynasty, who reigned from 1875 to 1908).

== Life ==
=== Family background ===
Imperial Noble Consort Wenjing's personal name was not recorded in history.

- Father: Changxu (長敘), served as the Right Vice Minister of Revenue
  - Paternal grandfather: Yutai (裕泰), served as the Viceroy of Shaan-Gan in 1851
  - Paternal grandmother: Lady Gūwalgiya
- Mother: Lady Zhao
- Three brothers:
  - Youngest brother: Tatara Zhaoxu (Father of Tan Yuling, Noble Consort Mingxian who married Puyi, Xuantong Emperor)
- Three elder sisters and one younger sister
  - Fifth younger sister: Imperial Noble Consort Keshun (1876–1900)

=== Tongzhi era ===
The future Imperial Noble Consort Wenjing was born on the 15th day of the eighth lunar month in the 12th year of the reign of the Tongzhi Emperor, which translates to 6 October 1873 in the Gregorian calendar.

=== Guangxu era ===
On 26 February 1889, Lady Tatara entered the Forbidden City and was granted the title "Concubine Jin". Her younger sister, the future Imperial Noble Consort Keshun, entered the Forbidden City at the same time and was granted the title "Concubine Zhen".

The Jadeite Cabbage sculpture, which is now on display in Taiwan's National Palace Museum, is believed to be part of the dowry settlement. The Guangxu Emperor did not particularly like her, and instead favoured her younger sister.

On 6 February 1894, Lady Tatara was elevated to "Consort Jin". In November 1894, Consort Jin's younger sister, Consort Zhen, was discovered to have abused her influence over the Guangxu Emperor by interfering in civil appointments. On 26 November 1894, Consort Jin was implicated and demoted along with her sister by Empress Dowager Cixi. The empress dowager also ordered the execution of a palace eunuch who collaborated with Consort Zhen. Zhirui, a cousin of the two consorts who served as an official, was banished from Beijing. On 29 May 1895, the two sisters were restored to their positions; however, Consort Zhen was placed under house arrest.

When the Eight-Nation Alliance invaded Beijing in 1900, the imperial court fled from the Forbidden City to Xi'an. They apparently forgot about Consort Jin and left her behind, but she was saved by a noble and brought to Xi'an later. Consort Zhen, on the other hand, died after being thrown into a well, allegedly on Empress Dowager Cixi's order.

When the imperial court returned to Beijing in 1902, the Qing dynasty had lost its influence.

=== Xuantong era ===
The Guangxu Emperor died on 14 November 1908, followed by Empress Dowager Cixi, who died one day after the emperor. Before her death, Cixi named Zaifeng's son, Puyi, as the new emperor. On 18 November 1908, Lady Tatara was elevated to Dowager Noble Consort Jin.

Puyi, the Last Emperor, had five other adoptive mothers in addition to his own biological mother, Youlan. Among the five, Empress Dowager Longyu ranked the highest while Dowager Noble Consort Jin ranked second. The other three, Dowager Imperial Noble Consort Zhuanghe, Dowager Imperial Noble Consort Jingyi and Dowager Imperial Noble Consort Ronghui were former consorts of the Tongzhi Emperor, the Guangxu Emperor's cousin and predecessor.

=== Republican era ===
In 1912, Empress Dowager Longyu signed the abdication documents on behalf of Puyi, bringing an end to the Qing dynasty. The empress dowager died on 22 February 1913, and Lady Tatara became the highest ranked woman in the palace. On 12 March 1913, Lady Tatara was elevated to "Dowager Imperial Noble Consort Duankang". In 1921, Puyi's birth mother, Youlan, committed suicide by swallowing opium after being publicly reprimanded by Lady Tatara for her son's misbehaviour.

Puyi wrote in his autobiography that Lady Tatara saw Empress Dowager Cixi as a role model, even though Cixi was responsible for the death of her younger sister. Lady Tatara's strictness often angered the young emperor Puyi, but she softened her approach towards him after his birth mother died.

When the time came for Puyi to marry, Lady Tatara and Dowager Imperial Noble Consort Jingyi had an argument over who should be the empress. Consort Wenjing favoured Wanrong, while Jingyi and Puyi himself preferred Wenxiu. In Lady Tatara's opinion, Wenxiu was not beautiful enough to be empress and she came from a lesser family background as compared to Wanrong. Even so, Puyi's first choice was Wenxiu, and this frustrated Lady Tatara. She held a discussion with other nobles and officials in the imperial court, and they succeeded in persuading Puyi to select Wanrong as his empress and to name Wenxiu as a consort.

Lady Tatara died on 24 September 1924 just before Puyi was forced to leave the Forbidden City.

== Titles ==
- During the reign of the Tongzhi Emperor (r. 1861–1875):
  - Lady Tatara (from 6 October 1873)
- During the reign of the Guangxu Emperor (r. 1875–1908):
  - Imperial Concubine Jin (瑾嬪; from 26 February 1889), fifth rank consort
  - Consort Jin (瑾妃; from 6 February 1894), fourth rank consort
  - Noble Lady Jin (瑾貴人; from 26 November 1894), sixth rank consort
  - Consort Jin (瑾妃; from 29 May 1895), fourth rank consort
- During the reign of the Xuantong Emperor (r. 1908–1912):
  - Noble Consort Jin (瑾貴妃; from 18 November 1908), third rank consort
- During the years of the Republic of China (1912–1949):
  - Imperial Noble Consort Duankang (端康皇貴妃; from 12 March 1913), second rank consort
  - Imperial Noble Consort Wenjing (溫靖皇貴妃; from 1924)

== In fiction and popular culture ==
- Portrayed by Chen Ping in The Last Tempest (1976)
- Portrayed by Liu Jun in The Last Emperor (1987)
- Portrayed by Ching Lan in The Rise and Fall of Qing Dynasty (1992)
- Portrayed by Wang Zi in Princess Der Ling (2006)
- Portrayed by Liu Tao in The Founding of a Party (2011)
- Portrayed by Lee Yee-man in The Last Healer in Forbidden City (2016)

== See also ==
- Ranks of imperial consorts in China#Qing
- Royal and noble ranks of the Qing dynasty
