= Tzeng Chin-fa =

Taiwanese photographer

Tzeng Chin-fa (chinese: 曾進發) is a Taiwanese photographer. He won a golden and two bronze awards at PX3 for his underwater photographs of women in wedding brides. In 2019, he won two golds at the Moscow International Foto Awards for his Tree of Life series.
