= Wu Tien-chang =

Taiwanese visual artist

- 吳天章
- Born: 28 September 1956 (age 69); Changhua County, Taiwan
- Education: Chinese Culture University (BFA)
- Occupation: Visual artist

Wu Tien-chang (Chinese: 呉天章; born 28 September 1956) is a Taiwanese visual artist who makes socio-political commentary work through oil painting and digital photography.

== Early life ==
Wu was born in 1956 in Changhua, Taiwan. His grandfather emigrated to Taiwan from mainland China where he married Wu's aboriginal Taiwanese grandmother. Wu's parents moved to Keelung and worked in a movie theater where his father painted posters and his mother sold tickets. He grew up in Taiwan where martial law restrained the society with censorship, and threats of violence from the Kuomintang were a brutal reality. The lifting of martial law in 1987 created a drastic change in Taiwanese society, which brought democracy as well as secured freedom of expression. Wu's critical view on socio-political issues grew significantly during this era of turmoil.

== Career ==
Wu received a B.F.A. from Chinese Culture University in 1980. Two years later, he became one of the founding members of the 101 Painting Society along with Yang Maolin. They aimed to import Neo-expressionism, which was flourishing in Europe and the United States at the time, and interpreted the style based on Taiwanese experience and aesthetics. The 101 Painting Society also aimed to challenge the minimalism style which was prevailing in Taiwan at the time.

== Works ==
=== Painting ===
Wu's Neo-expressionist paintings depicted taboos and sensitive subjects that addressed political issues in his early career. Wu's exhibition of Four Eras (1990) at the Taipei Fine Arts Museum consisted of four large paintings of political leaders Chiang Kai-shek, Chiang Ching-kuo, Mao Zedong, and Deng Xiaoping. Each of these large-scale paintings is almost four meters in width. In the portraits, Wu boldly portrayed people's struggles and oppression, and depicted them inside the torsos of the former rulers. By juxtaposing the portraits of the mainland Chinese and the Taiwanese former rulers, Wu intended to generate a new dialogue for the future.

=== Digital Photography ===
Wu's work delves deeply into Taiwanese identity as he attempts to reveal its hybrid nature. For the series of A Dream of Spring Night (春宵夢 1994-), he aimed to evoke nostalgia of the past era. A Dream of Spring Night II (1995) and IV (1997) were created using mixed-media, including installations. He installed a sepia-colored portrait of a girl based on photograph taken at a photo studio, in a small dark room. The expressionless young girl posed properly with her hands cupping her breasts, hiding her identity by wearing a pair of retro sunglasses. The picture frame was decorated with light bulbs and fake flowers. As a viewer stepped into the room, a pop song from the 1950s called "Happy Sailing" would suddenly start playing, and the light bulbs started flickering along with the rhythm. The 1950s was an important decade for Wu as it symbolized the time when Taiwanese identity was integrated in a flash moment after centuries of colonization.

By 2000, Wu's medium shifted from oil painting to digital photography. Wu said, "Before I take a single photograph, I do a rough 3D mapping-out on the computer. I take everything into account right down to the finest details, like the facial expressions, the movement of clothing in the wind and the visual path a viewer will take when perusing the work." Wu's digital photography imitates portrait studio backdrops and vintage posters, using themes from Chinese myths, folklore, and religion.

Wu's theme began to explore social issues based on Taoism, Buddhism, and karma. Show the Mutual Concern of the People in the Same Boat (2002) is metaphorical as Wu explained that "the belief of Buddhists and Taiwanese people in karma lies behind that artwork." In Wu's work, four paddlers are on a dragon boat with an overcasting sky in the background. Each man resembles a clown as they have white painted faces and wear bright yellow overalls. Their feet are sticking out from the bottom of the boat, trying to maintain balance using wooden shoes that are used in Chinese traditional circus.

== Exhibitions ==
Wu had been included in many group exhibitions since he finished his education in 1980. After seven years, he was invited to have his solo show at the Taipei Fine Arts Museum and exhibited Syndrome of Hurting. Upon its success, he was invited to hold another solo show at the museum in 1990, and showed Four Eras series.

Wu's work has been shown internationally, including at the Museum of Contemporary Art, Taipei, Taiwan (2014, 2009); Tina Keng Gallery, Taipei, Taiwan (2013) and Beijing, China (2012); Taipei Fine Arts Museum, Taipei, Taiwan (2011, 2009, 1990, 1987); the Kaohsiung Museum of Fine Arts, Kaohsiung, Taiwan (2011, 2010); the Soho Photo Gallery, New York, New York (2010); the Hong Kong Art Centre, Hong Kong, China (2010); Eslite Gallery, Taipei, Taiwan (2010); National Museum of Fine Arts, Taichung, Taiwan (2009); the National Art Museum of China, Beijing, China (2009); the Taipei Cultural Center, New York, New York (2008); and MOMA Contemporary, Fukuoka, Japan (1997).

Wu has also been included in the 1st Fukuoka Asian Art Triennial (1999) at the Fukuoka Asian Art Museum, 2nd Asia Pacific Triennial (1996) at the Queensland Art Gallery, and selected as one of the artists to represent Taiwan at the 47th International Art Exhibition of the La Biennale di Venezia (1997) and exhibited as a solo artist for the 56th International Art Exhibition - La Biennale di Venezia (2015).

== Awards ==
- 2009 The Jury's Special Awards of The 7th Annual Taishin Arts Awards
- 1998 Won Creation Award of Lin Chung-Shun Foundation
- 1994 Prize of Taipei Biennial of Contemporary Art
- 1986 New Trend Prize of Contemporary Art Trends

== See also ==
- Taiwanese art
