= Chang Chao-Tang =

Taiwanese photographer and filmmaker (1943–2024)

- 張照堂
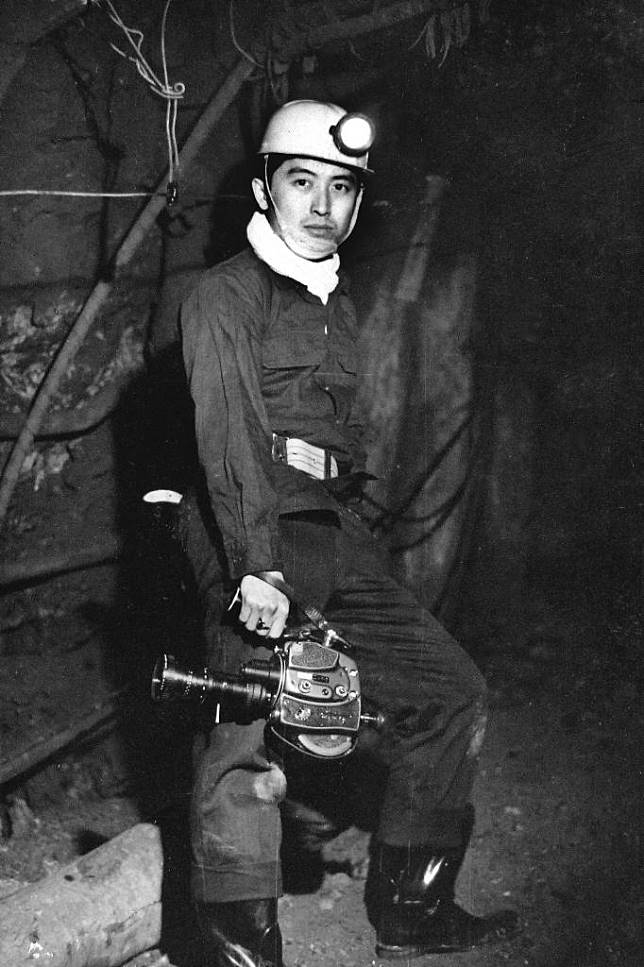
- Chang, 1970
- Born: November 17, 1943
- Died: April 2, 2024 (aged 80)
- Education: National Taiwan University (BS)
- Known for: Photography, filmmaking
- Awards: Golden Bell Awards 1980 The Boat Burning Festival; Best Cinematography for Documentary – 17th Golden Horse Awards 1980 Gu Cuo (The Old House); National Cultural Award 2011; Golden Horse Lifetime Achievement Award 2022; Outstanding Contribution Award – Taiwan International Documentary Festival 2024

Chang Chao-Tang (Chinese: 張照堂; 17 November 1943 – 2 April 2024) was a Taiwanese photographer, filmmaker, and educator. For his film work he received a Golden Bell Award, a National Cultural Award, an individual Golden Horse Award as well as the Golden Horse Lifetime Achievement Award. Chang's work is held in the collection of M+ in Hong Kong.

== Early life and education ==
Chang was born in Banqiao District, New Taipei City. After high school, he graduated from National Taiwan University with a Bachelor of Science (B.S.) in civil engineering.

== Life and work ==
Chang was an avant-garde photographer, a photojournalist, a cinematographer, and a filmmaker.

He made black and white photographs that, according to Jenny Zhang, "blend ideas of western surrealism and existentialism within Chinese ideology." For example, between 1962 and 1965, he photographed himself and friends with distorted bodies and faces, at derelict sites on the edge of the industrializing city. According to Tang Hsiang-yi writing in the Taipei Times, "images are intentionally out-of-focus, blurred or, in the case of the portraits, headless. Later, he will make a person's face or head blurry, covered or hooded in a plastic bag, yielding a sense of suffocation." In 1965, Chang had his first exhibition, Modern Photography, a two-person show with his teacher Cheng Shang-Hsi.

From 1968, he worked as a photojournalist for the state-owned China Television Company, making programs "that focused on subjects who were often overlooked by the official narrative of positivity, such as street vendors, traditional opera performers behind the scenes, and idle children at the park."

After an exhibition titled Farewell to Photography in 1974, Chang "departed from the avant-garde surrealist aesthetics seen in his early [photographic] work and started to produce a series of TV documentaries that mixed photojournalism, ethnography, experimental cinematography, and folk rock music."

From 2005, he began to experiment with colour photography.

From 1997 to 2009, he was a lecturer at Tainan National College of the Arts (now Tainan National University of the Arts) and was made an honorary professor upon his retirement.

Chang died on 2 April 2024, aged 80.

== Publications ==
=== Photography books by Chang ===
- In Search of Photos Past. Guang-hua Art Magazines Society, 1988. A survey of 20th century photography in Taiwan.
- Chang Chao-Tang. Youlhwadang, 2008.
- Moments in Time 1959–2005. Taoyuan, Taiwan: National Central University Art Center, 2010. In English and Chinese.
- The Invisible Contact 1959–1961. Self-published, 2010. In English and Chinese.
- Time: The Images of Chang Chao-Tang, 1959–2013. Taipei: Taipei Fine Arts Museum, 2013. ISBN 9789860381320. With essays by Chang Chao-Tang, Kuo Li-Hsin, Gu Zheng, Chang Shih-Lun, Sing Song-Yong, Ho Tung- Hung, and Shen Chao-Liang. In Chinese, and in English in some parts. Exhibition catalogue.

== Solo photography exhibitions ==
- Time: The Images of Chang Chao-Tang, 1959–2013, Taipei Fine Arts Museum, September–December 2013
- The Passage of Time, Taiwan Cultural Center, Tokyo, September–October 2015

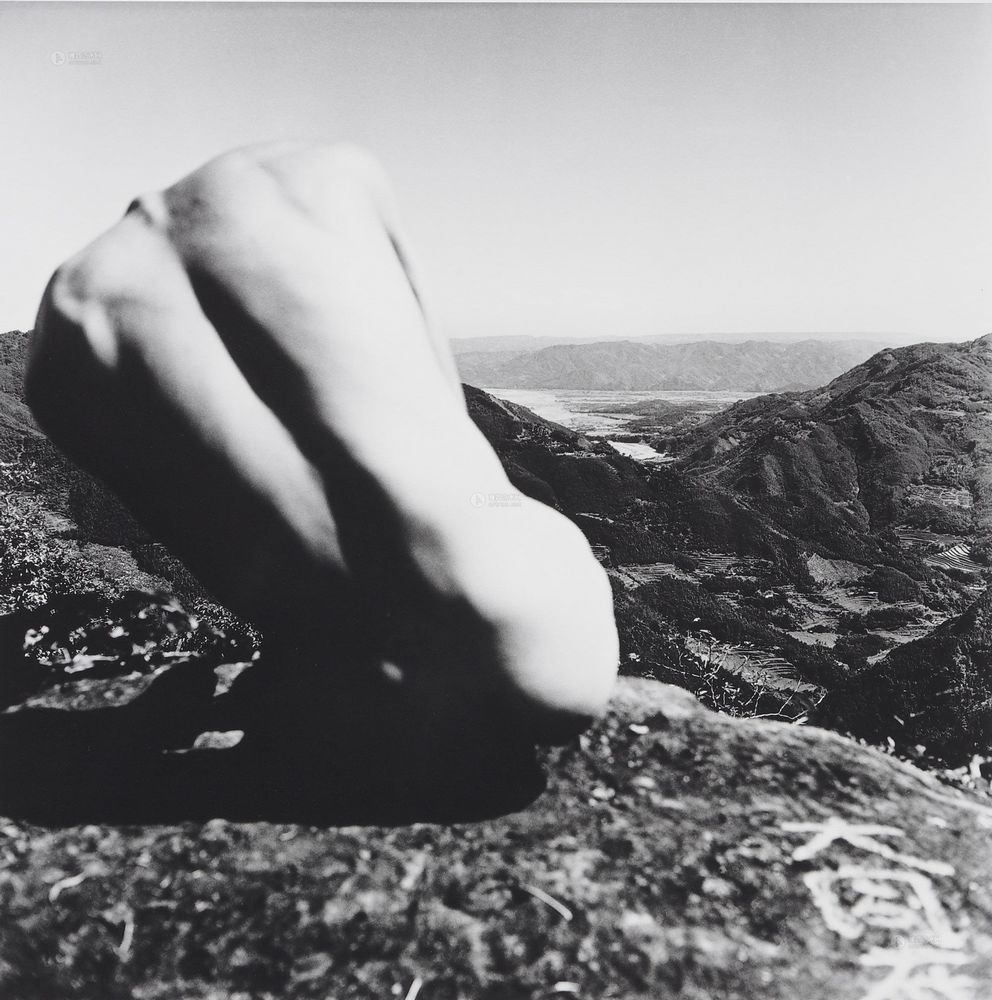
"新竹 五指山 1962" = Sinchu, Taiwan 1962

== Films ==
- China Behind (1974), cinematographer – directed by Tang Shu Shuen
- Homage to Hung-Tung (1978)
- The Boat Burning Festival = 王船祭典 (1979), director and cinematographer – cinematography also by Christopher Doyle; short; for China Television Company
- The Old House = Gu Cuo (1980)
- Woman of Wrath = Sha fu = 殺夫 (1984), cinematographer (as Chang Jaw Tarng) – directed by Chuang-Hsiang Tseng (as Tsenrg Juang-Shyang)
- Tang Dynasty Beautiful Male = Tang Chao qi li nan = 唐朝綺麗男 (1984), cinematographer and art director – directed by Chiu Kang-Chien
- The Glamorous Boys of Tang = 唐朝綺麗男 (1985) – directed by Chiu Kang-Chien
- Wo'men de Tiankong = Dan shui zui hou de lie che = 我們的天空 (1986), cinematographer – directed by I-Chen Ko; also known as Last Train to Tanshui
- Homage to Chen Da (2000)
- The Boat Burning Festival+ (2019)

== Awards ==
- 1980: Winner, best cinematography and editing category, Golden Bell Awards, Bureau of Audiovisual and Music Industry Development, for The Boat Burning Festival
- 1980: Winner, Best Cinematography for Documentary category, 17th Golden Horse Awards for Gu Cuo (The Old House)
- 1999: National Award for Arts, Taiwan
- 2011: Winner, 30th National Cultural Award, Executive Yuan of the Republic of China in Taiwan
- 2022: Golden Horse Lifetime Achievement Award at the 59th Golden Horse Awards, shared with Lai Cheng-ying
- 2024: Outstanding Contribution Award, Taiwan International Documentary Festival, Taipei

== Collections ==
Chang's work is held in the following permanent collection:

- M+, Hong Kong
