= National Taiwan Museum of Fine Arts =

Museum in West, Taichung, Taiwan

- 國立臺灣美術館
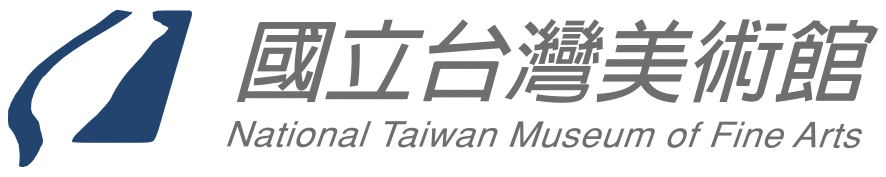

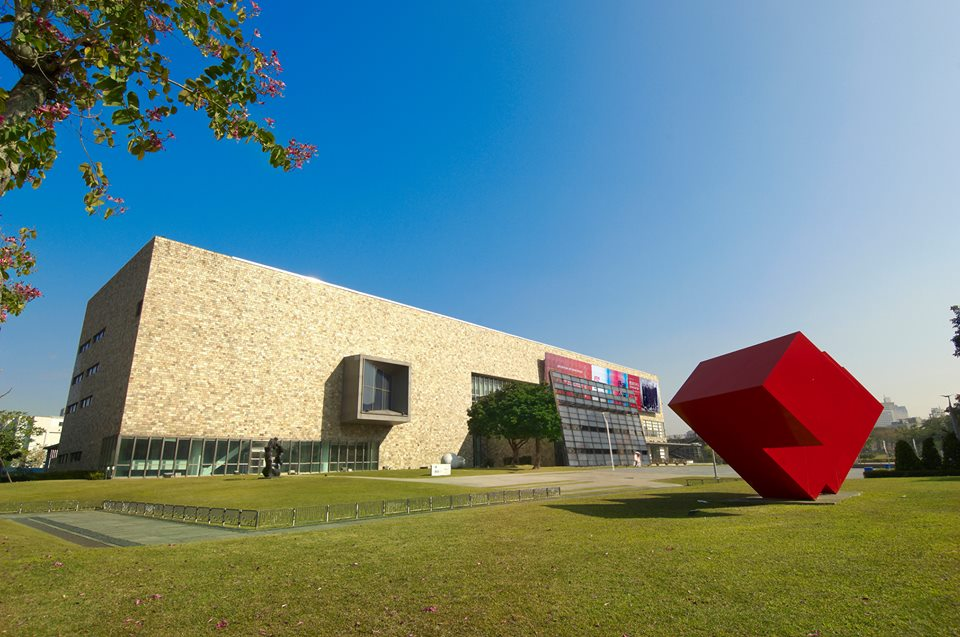
- Established: 26 June 1988
- Location: West, Taichung, Taiwan
- Coordinates: 24°08′28.9″N 120°39′48.9″E
- Type: art museum
- Visitors: 1,341,773 (2016)
- Director: Liang Yung Fei (梁永斐)
- Website: Official website

The National Taiwan Museum of Fine Arts (NTMoFA; traditional Chinese: 國立臺灣美術館; simplified Chinese: 国立台湾美术馆; pinyin: Guólì Táiwān Měishùguǎn) is a museum in West District, Taichung, Taiwan. NTMoFA was established in 1988 and is the first and the only national-grade fine arts museum in Taiwan. The major collections are works by Taiwanese artists, covering modern and contemporary Taiwanese arts. The museum covers 102,000 square meters, including the Public Outdoor Sculpture park, making it one of the largest museums in Asia.

National Taiwan Museum of Fine Arts was temporarily closed for renovation in 1999 due to damages caused by the 921 Earthquake and reopened in July 2004. From 2011 to 2016, NTMoFA attracted more than 1 million visitors each year.

== History ==
The National Taiwan Museum of Fine Arts opened on 26 June 1988 under the auspices of the Taiwan Provincial Government’s department of education; it was originally named Museum of Art. It was established under the policy to strengthen cultural development, on the basis of the needs of the people and recommendations from figures in the art world, held by Taiwan Provincial Government.

NTMoFA was closed in 1999 for renovation due to damages caused by the 921 Earthquake. It was later placed under the jurisdiction of the Council of Cultural Affairs (restructured as the Ministry of Culture on 20 May 2012) and renamed as National Taiwan Museum of Fine Arts, becoming Taiwan’s first and the only national-grade museum of fine arts. Since 2004, NTMoFA began to organize digital art exhibitions, events, and forums in addition to traditional exhibitions. Series of biennial exhibitions have also been established since 2007, expanding networks for international cooperation as well as the depth of dialogue in the art scene between Taiwan and the world.

== Architecture ==
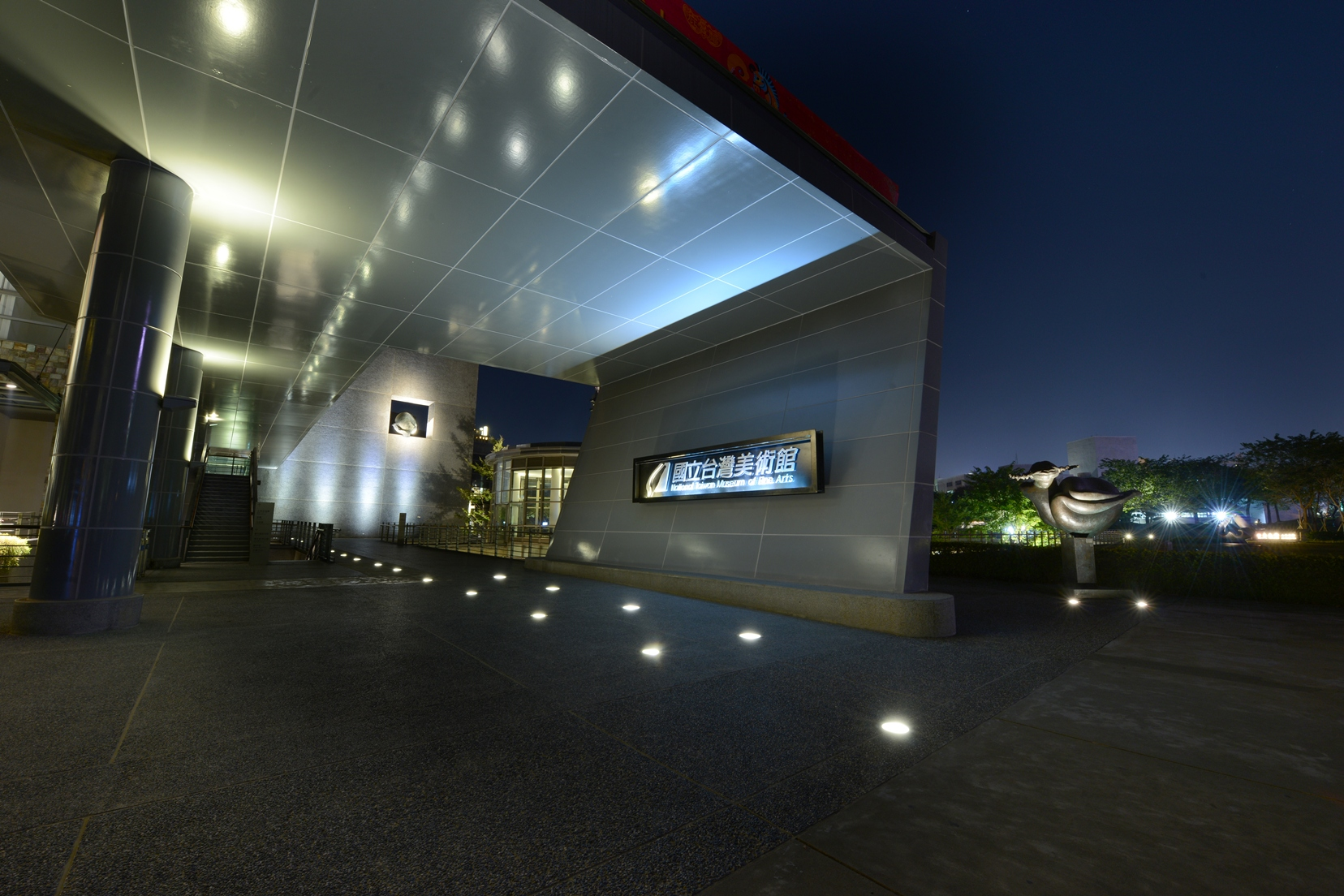
Evening view of NTMoFA

With a building area of 37,953 m^{2} and an outdoor courtyard area of 102,000 m^{2}, the National Taiwan Museum of Fine Arts contains 16 galleries, plus a gallery street and main lobby in the 4-story-building, which compose a total exhibition area of 13,525 m^{2}. This marks NTMoFA as one of the largest art museums in Asia.

The main building breaks the traditional architectural scheme that integrates the exterior views and activities with the performance and exhibition space. A transparent corridor connects the museum and outdoor nature scenes, creating a spatial transition and communicating a mutual awareness. The museum forms a communication bridge with the public through the extension of its urban greenbelt, the unifying of public services (including café and dining area, and the library) in order to encourage the general public to visit the museum.

The exterior of the Museum echoes the artistic atmosphere and contains a sculpture park that features 45 pieces of sculpture. These sculptures showcase the development of sculptural art in Taiwan. Along with the sculptures, the outdoor area also has a stone tablet forest with 50 calligraphic tablets that display traditional inkbrush styles, featuring the fine penmanship of renowned Taiwanese scholars who have been engraved onto stone. Calligraphy Greenway, a linear park, runs through the museum's outdoor space.

== Exhibitions ==
The National Taiwan Museum of Fine Arts systematically curates exhibitions around the central theme of the development of art in Taiwan, as well as international cultural and artistic exchanges, to form a path of communication between museum audience and the artworks. Series of biennial exhibitions, including the Asian Art Biennial (est. 2007), the Taiwan Biennial (est. 2008), the Contemporary Art Across the Strait Exhibition (est. 2009), and the International Biennial Print Exhibition expand the networks for international cooperation and deepen the dialogue in the art scene of Taiwan and the World. The National Taiwan Museum of Fine Arts has also organized "Venice Architecture Biennale-Taiwan Pavilion" since 2000, further promoting the interaction between Taiwan and the world and encouraging the mutual exchange of creativity and city development.

Under the program of the Cultural & Creative Industries Development Plan, the National Taiwan Museum of Fine Arts is in charge of the Digital Art Promotion Project, which aims to assist young artists in accumulating and expressing their creative momentum and to turn Taiwan into a hub of international digital art. Since 2004, international digital art exhibitions, forums, related activities have been held on-site to showcase the latest digital artworks from different countries. NTMoFA also established DigiArt (Digital Art Creativity and Resource Center) in 2007 with the mission to lay the foundation for the development of digital arts in Taiwan. In 2008, the Cyclorama Theater was constructed, housed commissioned works, and juried exhibitions. The Digital Technology and Visual Arts Collaborative Project (DTVACP) was initiated in 2012, aiming to promote cross-disciplinary collaboration between art and technology and to strengthen communication between Taiwanese and international digital arts communities.

List of Exhibitions

- Permanent exhibitions:
1. * Unique Vision: Highlights from the National Taiwan Museum of Fine Arts Collections
2. * Unique Vision II: Highlights from the National Taiwan Museum of Fine Arts Collections
- Theme Exhibitions
- Temporary Exhibitions
- Special Exhibitions

On 20 March 2021, the exhibition “Taiwanese Art Treasures Preserved Overseas” opened at the National Taiwan Museum of Fine Arts. The exhibition features 232 artworks by 195 artists and includes paintings, sculptures, and slides. The exhibition runs until 27 June 2021.

== Collection highlights ==
The National Taiwan Museum of Fine Arts expands its collection based on the regional characteristics of Taiwan, observing the interactions between Taiwanese art communities and their Asian counterparts. NTMoFA’s Collection Committee annually selects representative works that correspond with the museum’s collection policies. A wide range of artworks are also generously donated by different members of the society, representing an important part of the collection and a key public cultural resource of the museum. NTMoFA Collections

Open entries for young artists' works are called for annually under the Young Artist Collection Project, through which the outstanding works of a new generation of artists are collected by the museum. Young artist collections

== Service ==
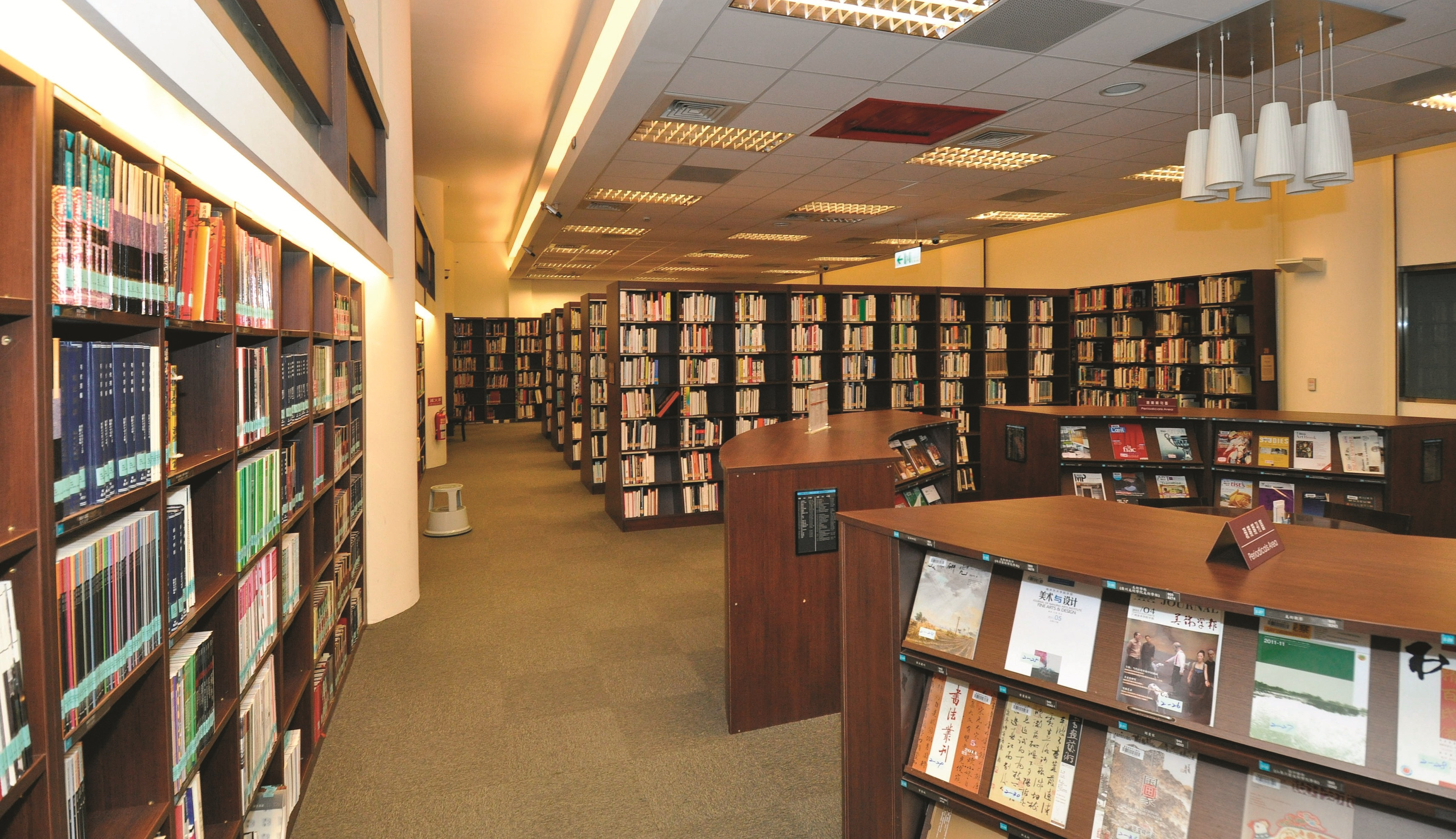
Library

Library The NTMoFA library committed to collecting, organizing, and preserving arts literature, references, and materials from Taiwan and other countries. As of June 2014, the library has 119,076 titles including 77,392 books, 29,086 periodicals, 2,712 digital resources, and 8,904 multi-media collections. Reader service also extends to the management of the Museum’s Digital Arts Creativity and Resource Center, E-Transit, Video Platforms, and the Children’s Picture Book Area. The library follows the museum’s opening hours.

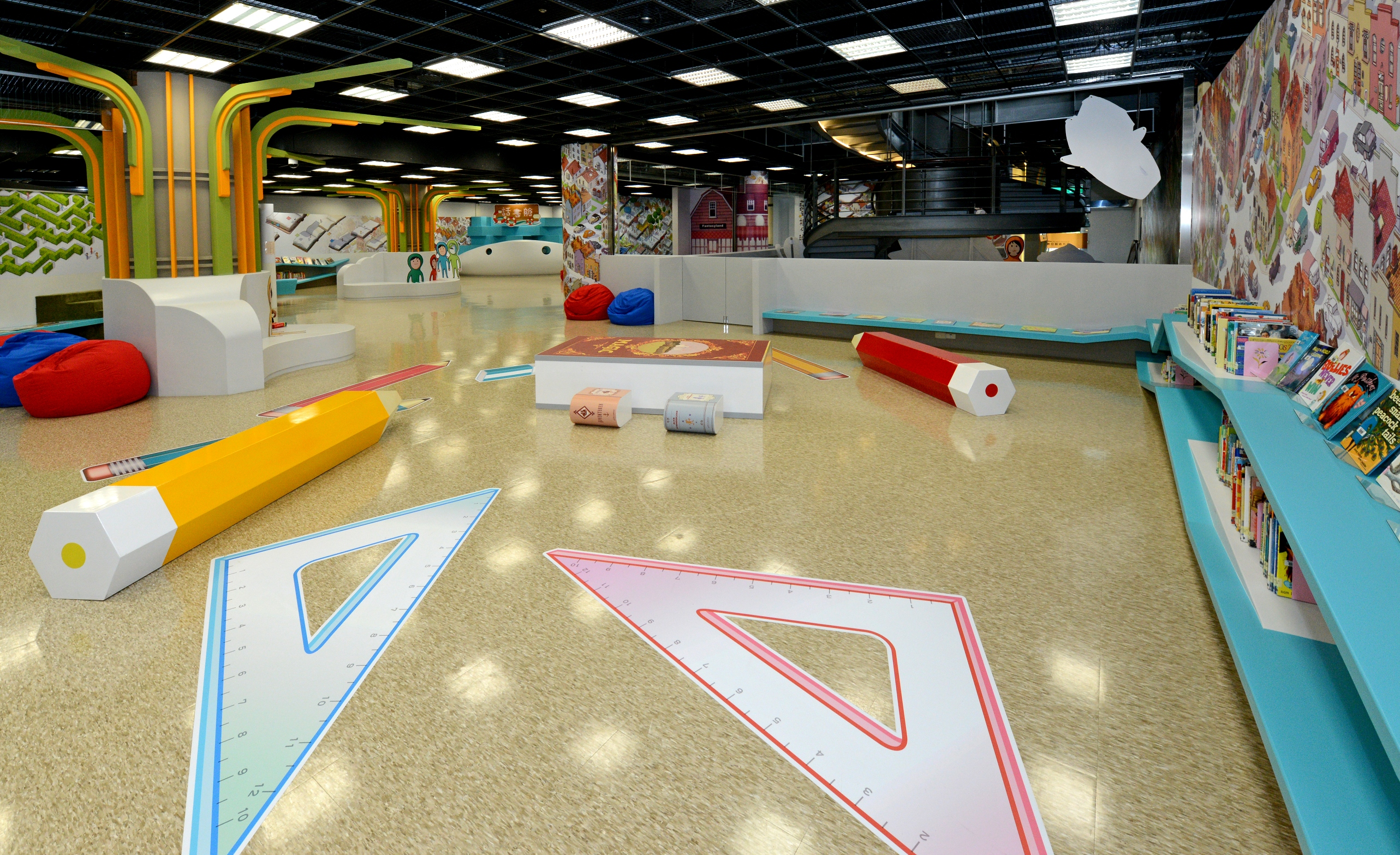
Children's Picture Book Area

Family Room National Taiwan Museum of Fine Arts has a specially designed Family Room for families with children. Promoting the concept of hands-on explorations, the Family Room provides various DIY activities that are designed based on museum exhibitions. A sense of creativity is inspired by taking various approaches to helping children develop an appreciation for originality in arts.

Hours & Admission

Monday: closed

Main Building:

Tuesday ~ Friday 12:00 ~18:00

Saturday 10:00 ~20:00

Sunday 10:00 ~18:00

E-Pavilion and Digiark:

Tuesday ~ Sunday 10:00 ~18:00

Guided Tours Daily regular guided tours at 10:30 and 14:30 Reserved guided tours are available for group of 15 or more. Reservations should be made online at least 2 weeks in advance.

Entry to NTMoFA is free except for special exhibitions.

== Transportation ==
From Taiwan Taoyuan International Airport: take Kingbus (Guoguang) or U Bus (Tunglien) towards Chao Ma Station. Get off at Sogo Department Store and take a taxi to National Taiwan Museum of Fine Arts.

From TR Taichung TRA station:

1. Take city bus 5, 75 to National Taiwan Museum of Fine Arts.
2. Take city bus 51 at Taichung Train Station Rear Entrance to Cultural Center.

From THSR Taichung Station: take shuttle bus #159 and get off at Tuku Station, walk for 15 minutes to National Taiwan Museum of Fine Arts.

Other city buses stops at National Taiwan Museum of Fine Arts or Cultural Center: 71, 23, 56, 30, 40, 89

By car:

- From Northern Taiwan: National Highway #3 → National Highway #1 → Taichung Interchange → Taiwan Boulevard → make a right turn at Mei-Tusen Rd → Wu-Chuan West Rd. intersection
- From Southern Taiwan:
1. National Highway #1: Nantun Interchange → Wu-Chuan West Rd → Mei-Tusen Rd
2. National Highway #3: Zhongtou Interchange → Zhoungtou Expressway → Wu-Chuan West Rd → Mei-Tusen Rd

== See also ==
- List of museums in Taiwan
- List of largest art museums
