= Statue of Shakyamuni Emerging =

Sculpture by Huang Tu-shui

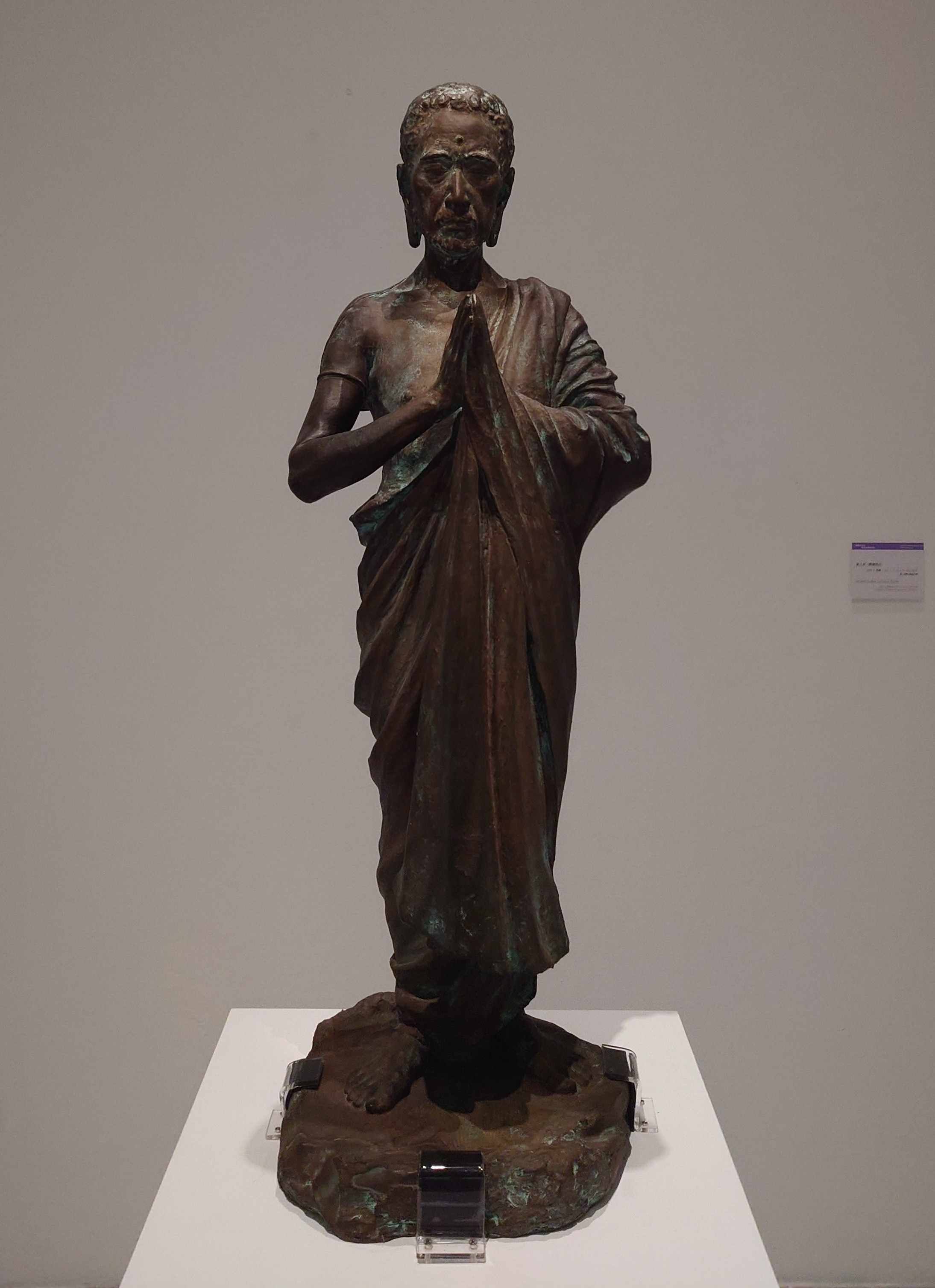
Bronze replica at
National Taiwan Museum of Fine Arts

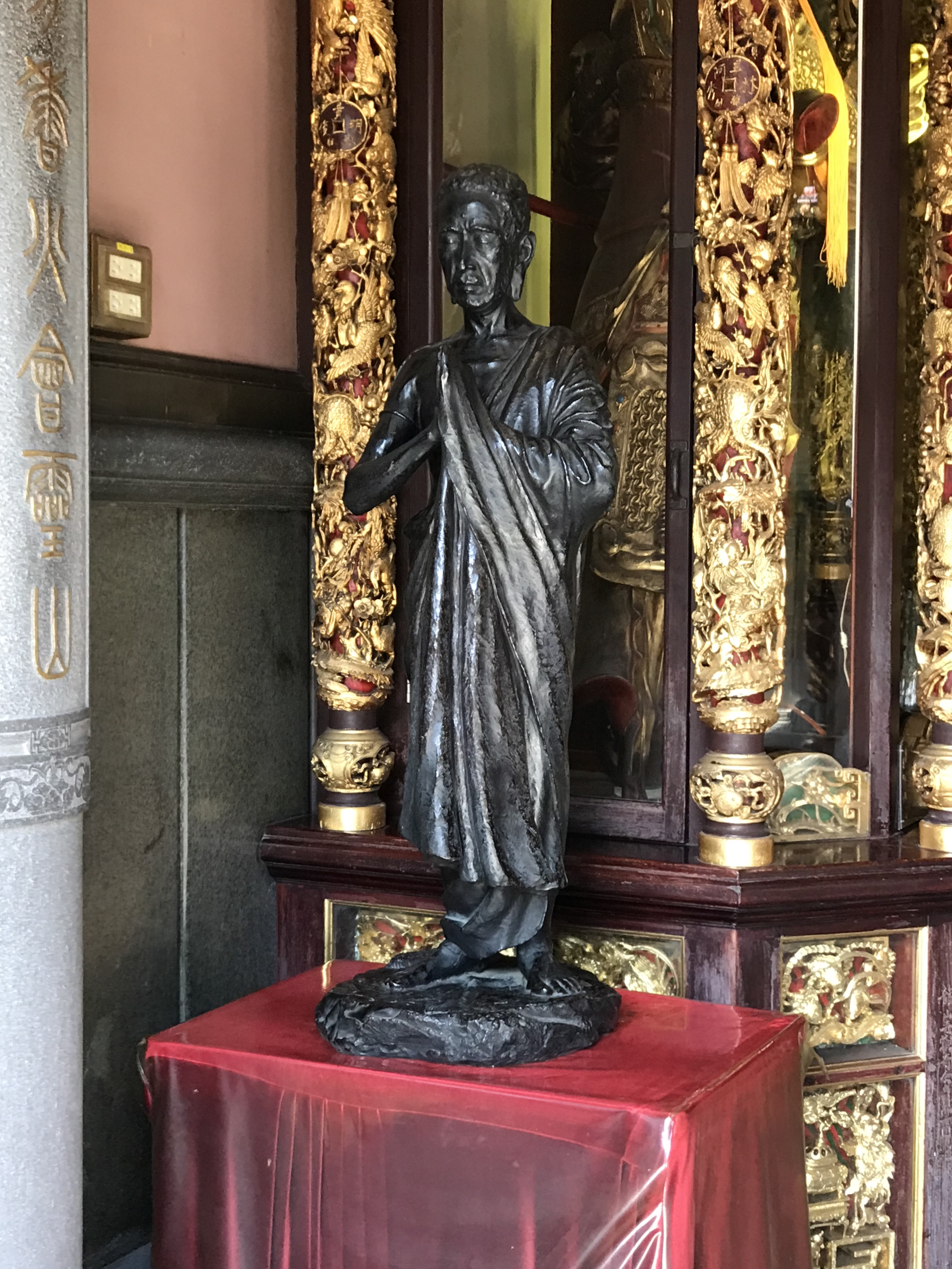
Replica at
Bangkah Lungshan Temple

Statue of Shakyamuni Emerging (Chinese: 釋迦出山像; lit. 'Statue of Shakyamuni Coming Out of the Mountain') is a woodcarving piece created by Taiwanese artist Huang Tu-shui in 1926. The replica of it has been listed as an important antiquity of the Republic of China.

== History ==
During the period of Japanese rule in Taiwan, although Huang Tu-shui became famous in the Teiten (Imperial Art Exhibition) of Japan, he was economically disadvantaged. The president of Taiwan Daily News, Akaishi Sadazo, once suggested that he should give up pure art creation and make smaller works to cater to the general audience to make a living. However, Huang Tu-shui refused to accept this suggestion. At that time, Wanhua residents were going to donate a statue of Sakyamuni to Longshan Temple, and Wei Ch'ing-tê presided over the fundraising. As a result, in the name of sculpting a Buddha statue, Wei raised funds for Huang Tu-shui to create this work.

The statue was completed in 1926 and brought back to Taiwan at the end of the year, and was enshrined in Longshan Temple.

In 1945, during the Taipei Air Raid, the Statue of Shakyamuni Emerging, enshrined in the side hall of Longshan Temple, was destroyed. Later, the Council for Cultural Affairs (now Ministry of Culture) invited Huang Chao-mo to complete the restoration in 1989. On October 30 of the same year, the Council for Cultural Affairs donated five bronze replicas to the National Museum of History, National Taiwan Museum of Fine Arts, Kaiyuan Temple in Tainan, Kaohsiung Museum of Fine Arts, and Longshan Temple, where the original wood carving was displayed.

== Composition ==
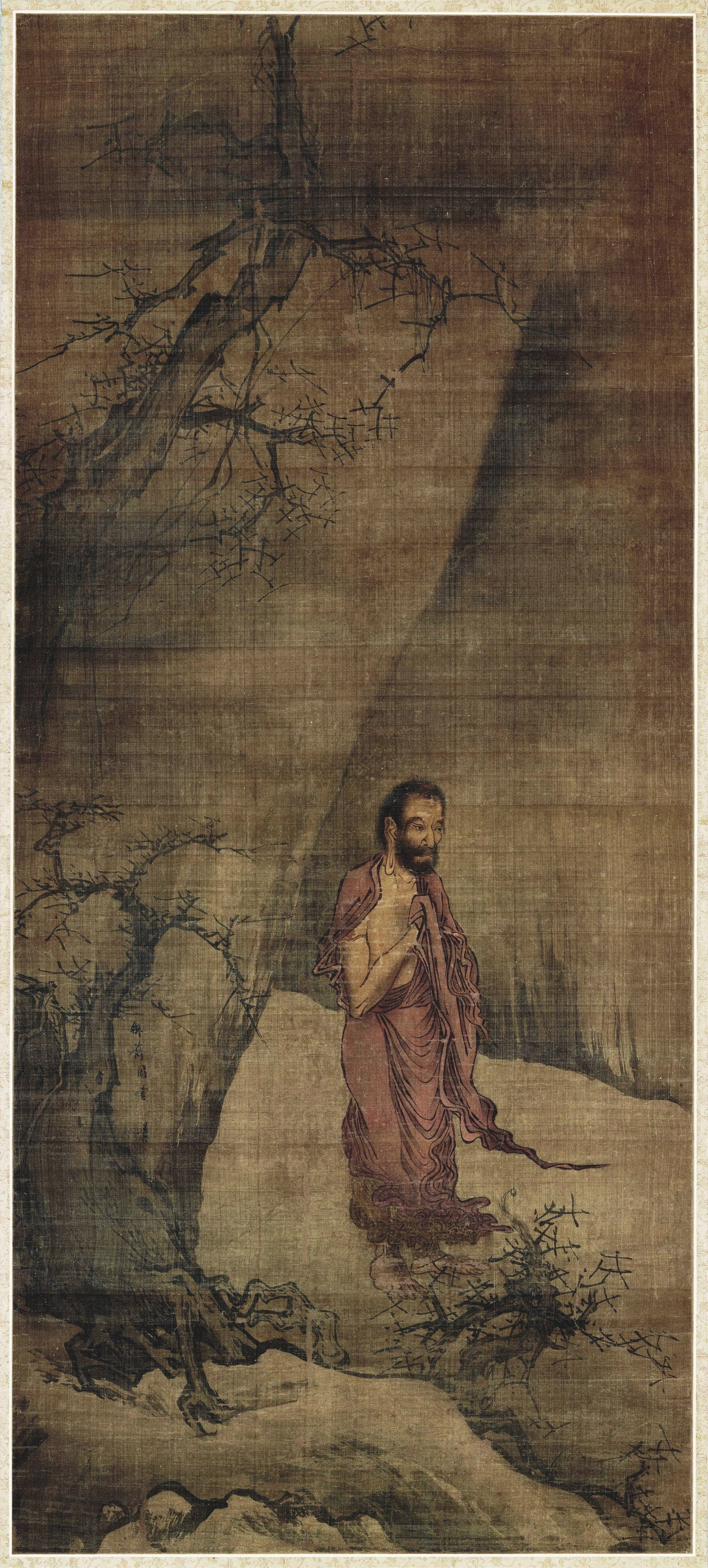
Liang Kai's Shakyamuni Emerging from the Mountains, 13th century

Huang Tu-shui's design did not follow the traditional style for Buddha sculptures. He was inspired by the painting Shakyamuni Emerging from the Mountain by Liang Kai, a painter from the Song dynasty.

Huang carved the appearance of the Shakyamuni Buddha, who eventually became enlightened after nine years of practice and descended the mountain. Therefore, the sculpture's name is the Statue of Shakyamuni Emerging.

The Buddha stands dignified with palms folded, pulling a drooping robe to form two pulling forces. The two forces are closed by a rounded hem and a pair of bare feet, balanced and open. Huang created the statue by first making a clay sculpture and then turning it into a plaster statue, which was used as a mold to carve it out of wood.
