= Huang Tu-shui =

Taiwanese sculptor

- 黃土水
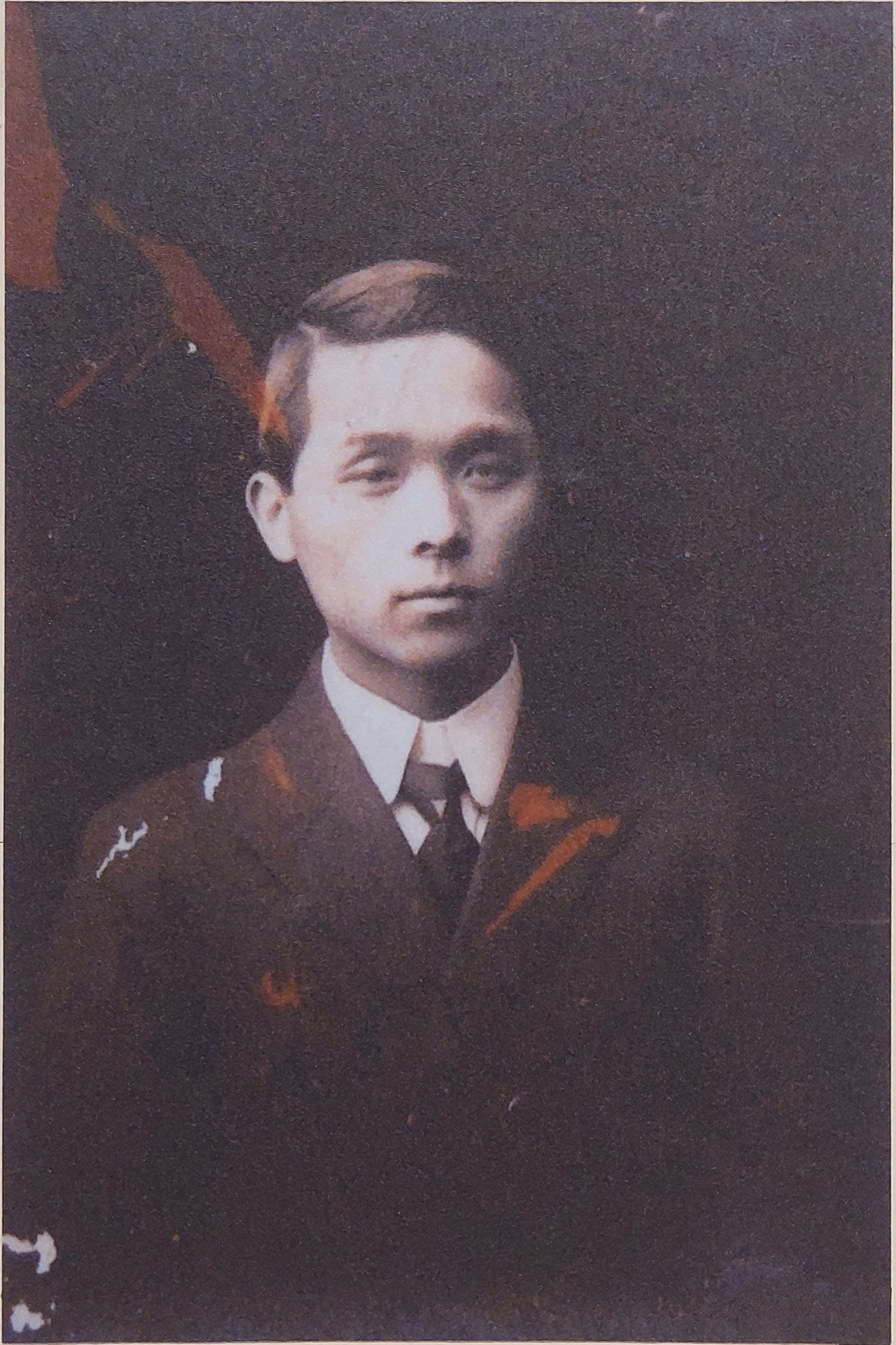
- Born: 3 July 1895; Wanhua, Taihoku, Japanese Taiwan
- Died: 21 December 1930 (aged 35); Ikebukuro, Tokyo, Japan
- Other name: N̂g Thô͘-chúi
- Occupation: Sculptor

Huang Tu-shui (Chinese: 黃土水; pinyin: Huáng Tǔshuǐ; Pe̍h-ōe-jī: N̂g Thô͘-chúi; 1895–1930) was a pioneer of modern sculpture in Taiwan. From his youth, Huang was familiar with the traditional carving of Taiwan, and was influenced by modern Western styles during his studies in Tokyo.

== Biography ==
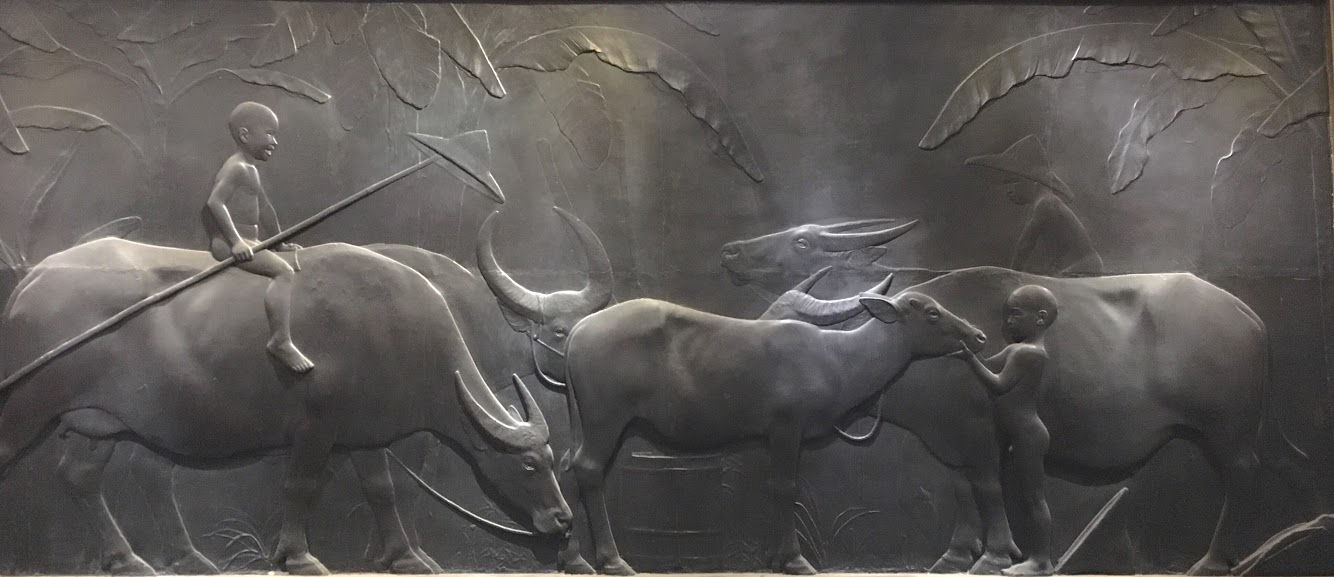
Huang's last and most famous work, The Water Buffalo (水牛群像; Shuǐniú Qúnxiàng, 1930). Plaster cast, located in Taipei's Zhongshan Hall

Huang was born on 3 July 1895 in Mengjia (or Manka; now known as Wanhua District), Taipei City, and his father was a rickshaw repairman. Huang's eldest brother had already died by the time he was born. Huang's elder surviving brother took up their father's trade and inspired young Huang to sculpt. Huang's father died when Huang was twelve, and the family moved to Dadaocheng. He was a student at Da Daocheng Elementary School, now called Taiping Elementary School.

Huang was trained in Tokyo, and later worked there, when Taiwan was part of the Japanese Empire. During Huang's time in Japan, he was mentored by sculptor Fumio Asakura. Six months after graduating from school, he was sponsored by a Taiwan Governor-General official to study carving at the Tokyo School of Fine Arts. He was the first Taiwanese student to attend the Tokyo School of Fine Arts, and also the first Taiwanese artist to be participate in the Imperial Art Exhibition of Japan (帝展, Teiten). He submitted the sculpture (Bust of a) Girl into the exhibition and later donated the work to Taiping Elementary School in Taipei.

During the last decade of his life, the focus of his works shifted more and more to local Taiwanese motifs, with Huang showing a particular taste for depicting water buffalo, a symbol of rural Taiwan. These works blended modern Western style with traditional Chinese elements.

Huang died on 26 December 1930 in Japan, at the age of 36, after contracting peritonitis. Huang is best known for his mural South Land, also known as Water Buffalo, which was completed just before his death. The work is on permanent display at Zhongshan Hall in Taipei, and Taiwanese writer Zhang Zhao Xuan has described it as "a national treasure".

== Selected works ==
- Teijiro Yamamoto (early work, plaster), a bust of Japanese politician Teijiro Yamamoto, kept in subject's birthplace, Sado, Niigata. Lent to National Taiwan Museum of Fine Arts for restoration and reproduction. A bronze version was made and displayed at Kaohsiung Bridge, until it also went to Sado at the end of World War II.
- Li Tieguai (李鐵拐; Lǐ Tiěguǎi, 1915), wooden figure depicting the Li Tieguai, one of the Eight Immortals in the Daoist religion.
- The Chubby Playing Boy (山童吹笛; Shāntóng Chuī Guǎi, 1918), plaster figure, original lost today. Recorded in the 1920 Imperial Exhibition.
- Water of Immortality, formerly Sweet Dew (甘露水; Gān Lùshuǐ, 1919), marble figure. Recorded in the imperial exhibition in 1921. Rediscovered by Lin Mun-lee in 2021, after the work had been lost fifty years previously.
- Bust of a Girl (女孩胸像; Nǚhái Xiōngxiàng, 1920), gift of the artist to his old elementary school (Taiping Elementary School in Taipei).
- Posing Woman (擺姿勢的女人; Bǎi Zīshì de Nǚrén, 1922), original lost today. Recorded in the 1922 Imperial Exhibition.
- Mikadofasan and Sikahirsch (帝雉, 華鹿; Dìzhì Huálù, 1922), a gift to the Japanese imperial house, now in the imperial court office of Tokyo.
- In the Country (郊外; Jiāowài, 1924), bronze sculpture of a water buffalo with two herons, original lost today. Recorded in the 1924 Imperial Exhibition.
- Sculpture created to commemorate Crown Prince Hirohito's 1923 visit to Taiwan, given to him as a gift.
- In the South (南國的風情; Nánguó de Fēngqíng, 1927). Relief of a water buffalo herd, original lost today.
- Statue of Shakyamuni Emerging (釋迦出山; Shìjiā Chū Shān, 1927). Commissioned on behalf of Taipei's Lungshan Temple, a wooden sculpture representing Gautama Buddha. Destroyed by an air raid during World War II, later reconstructed using a remaining plaster design. Copies can be also found in the Taipei Fine Arts Museum, the Taipei National History Museum, the Kaohsiung Museum of Fine Arts, Taipei's Lungshan Temple, Tainan's Kaiyuan Temple, and with the artist's family.
- Busy Portrait of Prince Kuni Kuniyoshi and His Wife (邇宮邦彥親王夫婦像; Ĕr Gōng Bāngyàn Fūfù Xiàng, 1928). Owned by the Japanese emperor.
- Bust of Tomoe Takagi (1929). Commissioned in 1929 by Taiwan Electricity Company executive Hayanosuke Nagata for Tomoe Takagi Donated to National Changhua Senior High School in 2015 by the widow of Takagi's grandson.
- The Water Buffalo (水牛群像; Shuǐniú Qúnxiàng, 1930). Plaster cast, last and most famous work of the artist. The original is located in Taipei's Zhongshan Hall, with copies in the Taipei Fine Arts Museum and the Kaohsiung Museum of Fine Arts (bronze cast).

== See also ==
- Taiwanese art
