= Judicial Building =

Government building in Zhongzheng, Taipei, Taiwan

- 司法大廈; Sīfǎ Dàxià (Mandarin); Su-hoat Tāi-hā (Taiwanese); Sṳ̂-fap thai-ha (Hakka)
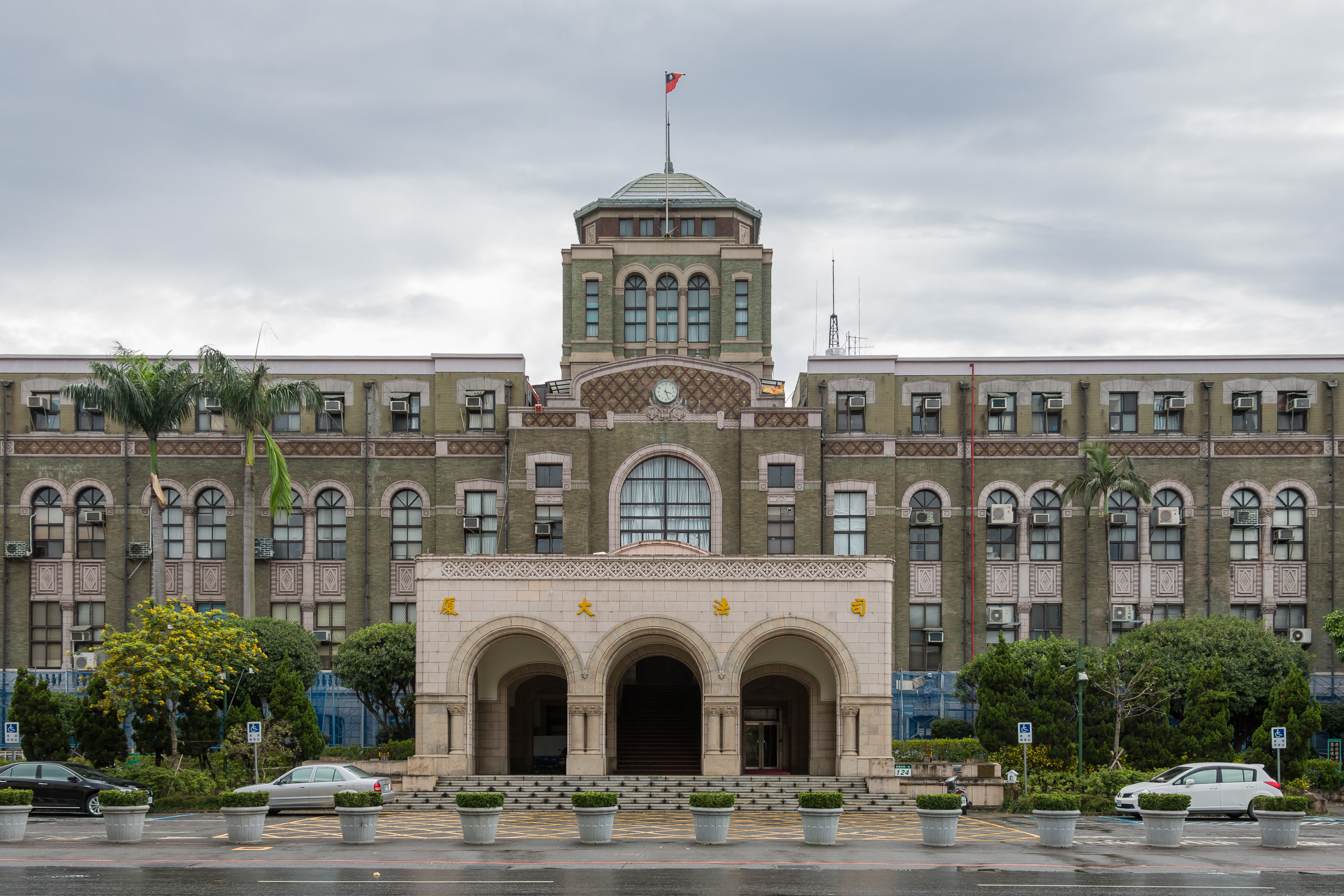
- Interactive map of the Judicial Building area
- Former names: High Court of the Government-General of Taiwan (臺灣總督府高等法院)

General information
- Location: Zhongzheng, Taipei, Taiwan
- Coordinates: 25°02′16.8″N 121°30′43.0″E
- Groundbreaking: 1929
- Completed: 1934

Height
- Architectural: Transition

Technical details
- Floor count: 4

Design and construction
- Architect: Kaoru Ide
- Main contractor: Katsura Shokai Corporation, Ikedagumi Corporation

National monument of Taiwan
- Type: Government Office
- Designated: 30 July 1998

The Judicial Building (Chinese: 司法大廈; pinyin: Sīfǎ Dàxià; Pe̍h-ōe-jī: Su-hoat Tāi-hā) is a governmental building in Zhongzheng District, Taipei, Taiwan. It houses several judicial agencies of Taiwan, including

- Judicial Yuan — the judiciary and constitutional court of the government of the Republic of China (Taiwan),
- Taiwan High Court,
- Taiwan High Prosecutors Office, and
- Disciplinary Sanction Court.

== History ==
Originally constructed as the High Court of the Government-General of Taiwan (臺灣總督府高等法院, Taiwan Sōtokufu Kōtō Hōin), it was a major governmental building of the Japanese era. It was the highest-level judicial institution of its day, though still subordinate to the Governor-General of Taiwan's office. It held authority over the district courts and prosecutor's offices of Taipei and Taichung. Construction began on the building in 1929 and was completed in 1934.

== Architecture ==
The building was designed by the Japanese architect Ide Kaoru, whose other well-known works include the Executive Yuan building and Zhongshan Hall in Taipei. Originally it had three floors, with one more added later. The building is laid out in the Chinese character for "sun" (日)· Designed along minimalist lines in an eclectic style, the building features two skylights for ventilation and ambient lights, as well as arched doors and windows.

Its light green exterior wall tiles served to enhance air defence. One of its unusual features is the roof of the central tower. Octagonal with a prominent rim and a rippled surface, it is helmet-shaped in a manner reminiscent of the bell-and drum tower of Lungshan Temple of Manka, Wanhua District. This incorporation of local Taiwanese architectural forms was an element of the Imperial Crown Style, reflecting the Japanese imperialist government's ideology of the Greater East Asia Co-Prosperity Sphere through a fusion of local design features.
