= National Changhua Senior High School =

Coordinates: 24.0723°N 120.5520°E

- 國立彰化高級中學
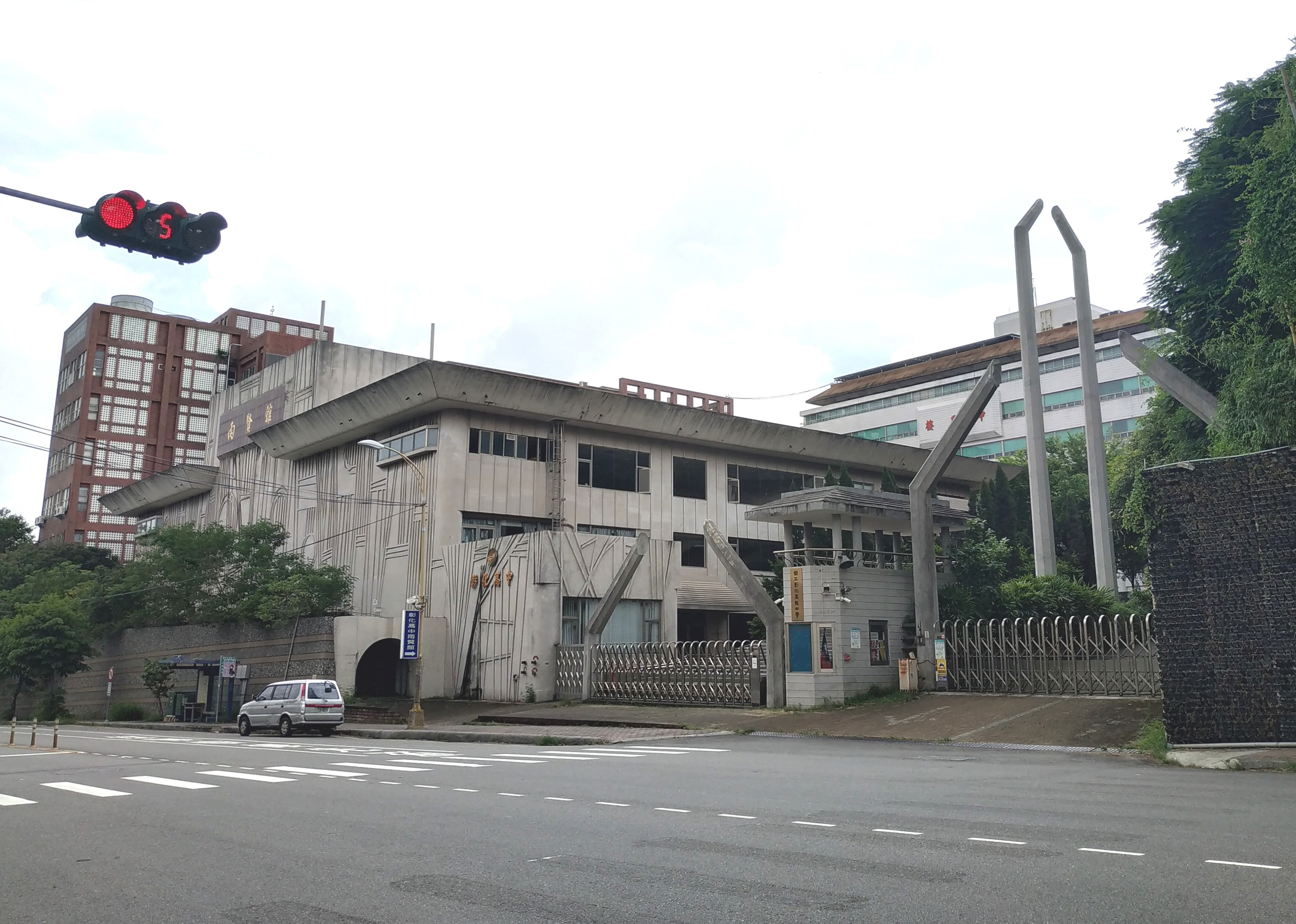
- Changhua City, Changhua County, Taiwan; 500; Taiwan

Information
- Type: Public
- Motto: 誠實榮譽 (Be honest and honourable.)
- Established: 1942
- Headmaster: Yan-huang Wang
- Staff: 200
- Grades: 10-12
- Years offered: 3
- Gender: Boys
- Age range: 15-18
- Enrollment: 2400
- Classes: 63
- Hours in school day: 10 - 14
- Campus size: 63669 square meters
- Athletics conference: HBL(High School Basketball League in Taiwan)
- Sports: Basketball, Baseball, Volleyball, Table Tennis
- Mascot: Snail
- Team name: Red Lightning
- Website: www.chsh.chc.edu.tw

The National Changhua Senior High School (CHSH; Chinese: 國立彰化高級中學) is a Taiwanese high school for boys, located in Changhua City, Changhua County, Taiwan. CHSH was established in 1942 during World War II and the late years of Japanese rule.

The school is accessible south east from Changhua Station of Taiwan Railway.

== Notable alumni ==
- Stan Shih (施振榮), the founder, president, and chairman of Acer Inc.
- Henry Lee (forensic scientist) (李昌鈺), Taiwanese-American forensic scientist
- Richie Jen (任賢齊), singer, actor
- Tsai Chih Chung (蔡志忠), cartoonist
- Yan Hong-sen (顏鴻森), academic, politician; former curator of National Science and Technology Museum and former vice president of National Cheng Kung University
- Louis Lee (李羅權), physicist; former director of the National Applied Research Laboratories and the National Space Organization
- Wang Sheng-hong (王盛弘), writer
- Chiu Chuang-chin (邱創進), politician
- Chang Juu-en (張祖恩), engineer and former minister of the Environmental Protection Administration
- Kuo Lin-yung (郭林勇), politician; former Vice-Minister of Justice
- Delon Wu (吳德朗), doctor, medical expert; associate professor of University of Illinois at Chicago, professor of Keck School of Medicine of USC, co-founder of Linkou Chang Gung Memorial Hospital, the first chancellor of Chang Gung University College of Medicine

== See also ==
- Education in Taiwan
