= Ide Kaoru =

Japanese architect

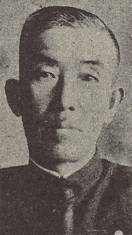
- Born: 1879; Gifu Prefecture
- Died: 1944 (aged 64–65)
- Education: Tokyo Imperial University
- Occupation: Architect
- Buildings: Executive Yuan Building, Judicial Yuan Building, Zhongshan Hall

Ide Kaoru
- Traditional Chinese: 井手薰
Transcriptions
Standard Mandarin
- Hanyu Pinyin: Jǐngshǒu xūn

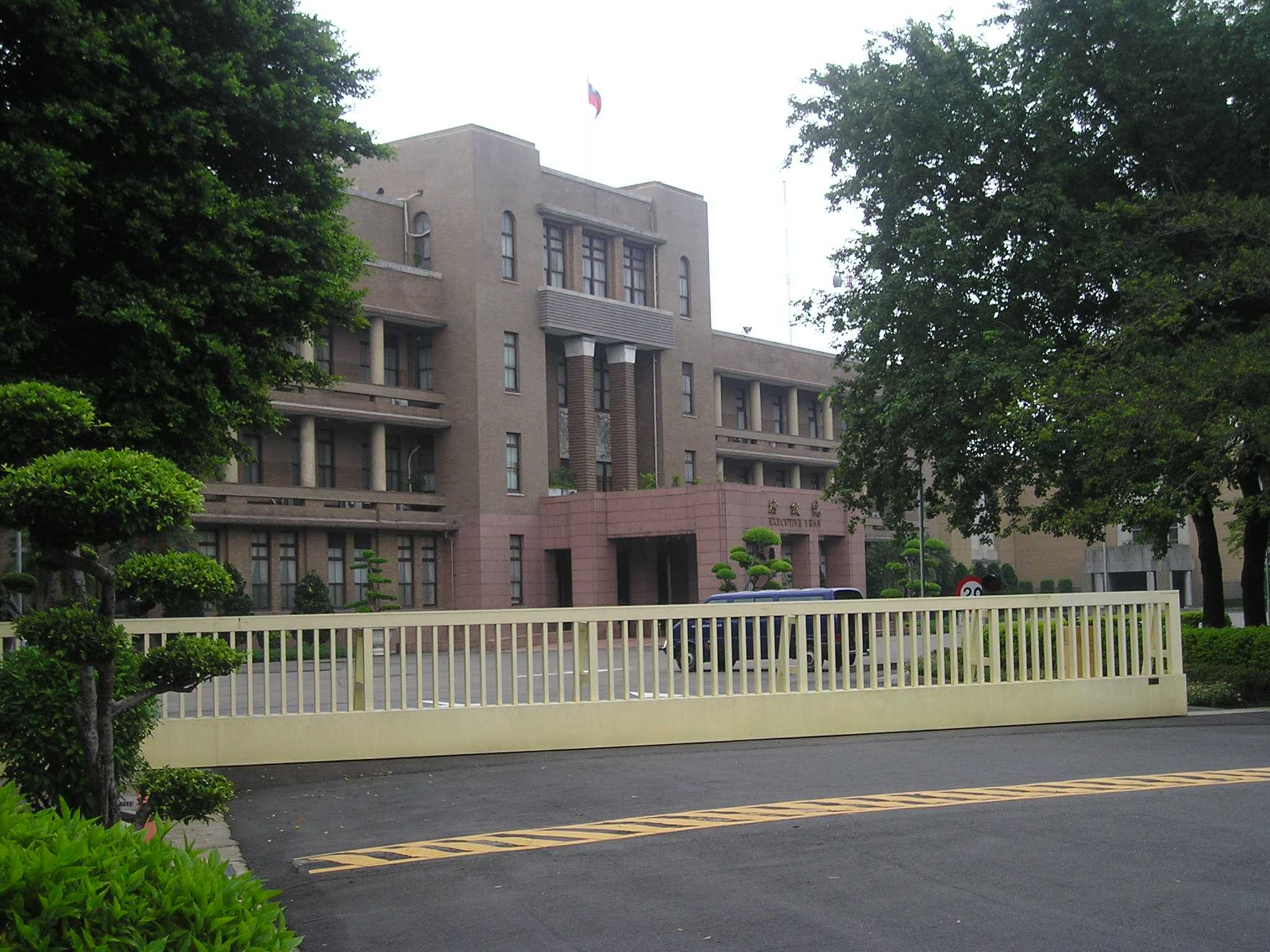
The Executive Yuan is one of the main seats of government in Taipei.

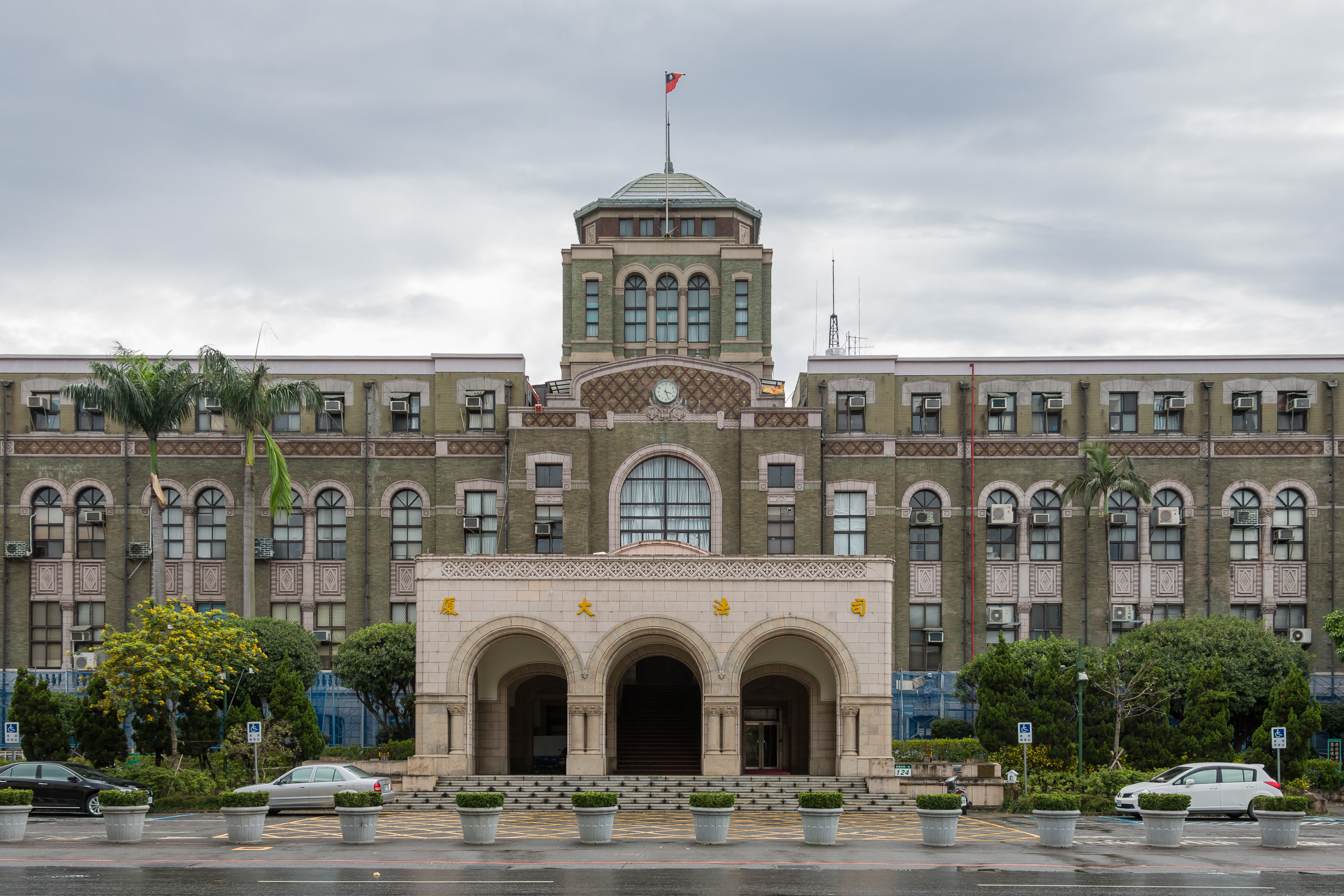
Judicial Yuan Building, originally constructed as the High Court.

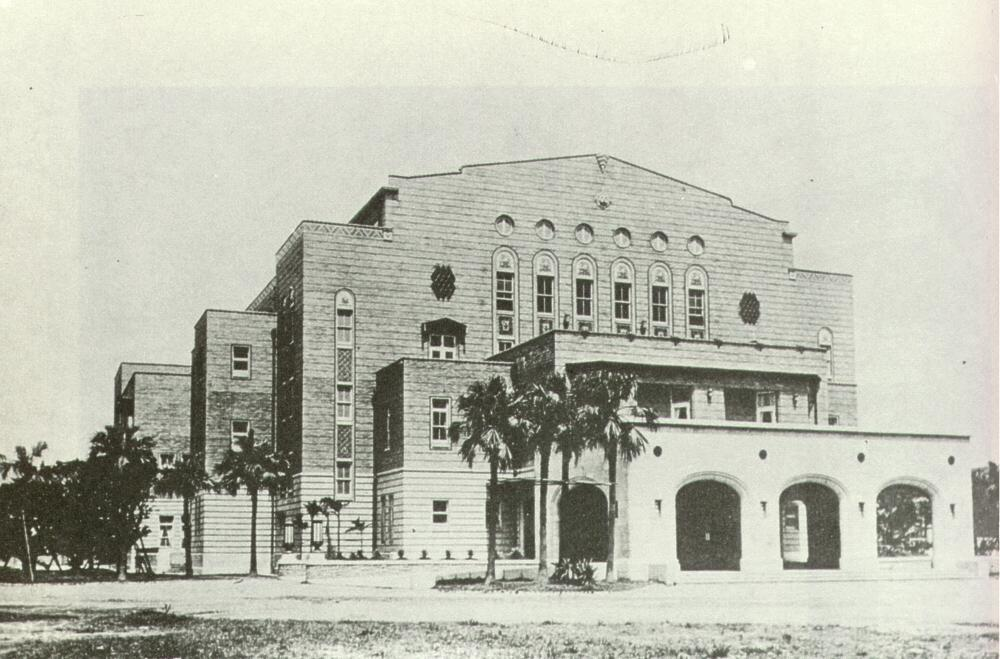
Taipei Zhongshan Hall, originally Taipei City Public Auditorium, as it appeared in 1940.

Ide Kaoru (井手薰,いで かおる, February 6, 1879 - May 11, 1944) was Chief Architect of the Governor-General's Office in Taiwan, when the island was part of the Japanese Empire. He held office in the Building and Repairs section of the Japanese Government-General in Taiwan, and was mainly involved with government and municipal building projects. His distinctive architectural ideas influenced the Taiwanese architectural profession. He was born in Gifu Prefecture Japan.

Ide Kaoru favoured a "localisation" approach to Taiwan's architecture. He was influenced by Modernism, and in 1929 was elected President of the Taiwan Architectural Association (台湾建築学会, Taiwan Kenchiku Gakkai). He was an advocate of using reinforced concrete, and this featured in almost all his works. Seismic resistance was of the highest priority, as Taiwan is prone to earthquakes.

Amongst Ide's most notable works was the Zhongshan Hall in Taipei, which remains in daily use today as a concert hall and cultural centre. Over the years, many receptions have been held there for heads of state and foreign dignitaries, and in 1992 it was designated a Class Two National Historical Site. He also designed the Judicial Yuan Building in the Imperial Crown style, which was completed in 1934. His design for the Executive Yuan building (completed 1940) was influenced by Art Deco and the work of Frank Lloyd Wright.

Ide graduated from Tokyo Imperial University in 1906, then moved to Taiwan in 1911. He was one of the few Japanese architects to immerse himself professionally in Taiwan, and stayed there for more than thirty years. He also wrote extensively on the subject of architecture.

== Notable works ==
- Taipei Presbyterian Church (1916)
- Chienkung Shrine (Kenkō Jinja, 建功神社, 1928) N.B. Heavily modified from its original design after WWII.
- Taipei University School Building and Lecture Hall (1928)
- Taipei Taiwan Education Hall (1931)
- Judicial Office Building (1934)
- Commemorative Exposition of the Beginning of the Governance of Taiwan for 40 years (1935)
- Hsinchu Police Headquarters (1935)
- Taipei Zhongshan Hall (1936, originally Taipei City Public Auditorium)
- Kaohsiung Customs House (1936)
- Taipei Police Headquarters (1936)
- Chiayi Police Headquarters (1937)
- Executive Yuan building (1940)
