= Taiwan Buffalo =

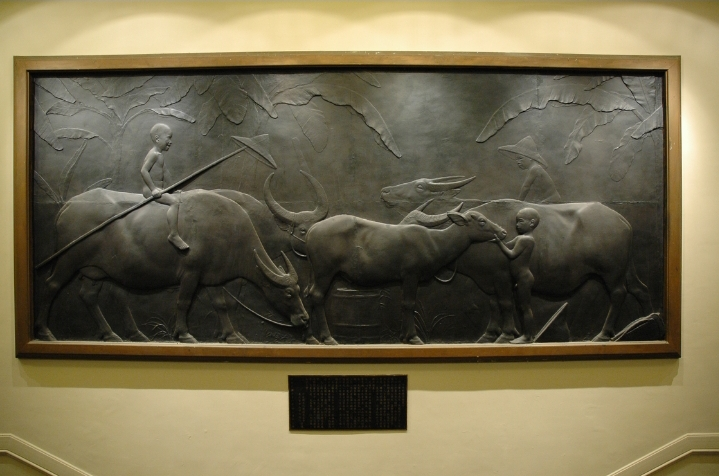
Taiwan Buffalo at Zhongshan Hall

Taiwan Buffalo (also known as Taiwan Buffalos, or Water Buffalo) is a plaster bas-relief work, which was completed in 1930 by the Taiwanese sculptor Huang Tu-shui. It is regarded as an important work in the history of Taiwanese art by art history researchers such as Hsiao Chong-ray and Yen Chuan-ying. The original work is currently being displayed at Zhongshan Hall, Taipei.

== History ==
Huang Tu-shui created this large-scale sculpture 555 cm wide and 250 cm high in his studio in Ikebukuro, Tokyo, Japan, using bas-relief techniques. After completing this work, Huang Tu-shui died of appendicitis complicated by peritonitis on 21 December 1930 due to overwork. This work was therefore unable to participate in the upcoming Teiten (Imperial Art Exhibition).

In 1937, Huang Tu-shui's widow, Liao Chiu-kui, donated this work to the Taipei Municipal Office. Due to its huge size and fear of the plaster cracking, this work was first cut into eight pieces of plaster, and then transported back to Taiwan with Japanese ships. The work was later put back together when it arrived in Taiwan, and was displayed on the central wall of the staircase landing between the second and third floor of the newly completed Taipei City Public Auditorium, which is now Zhongshan Hall. The original joint marks from the cutting can still be visibly observed on the work itself.

On 2 March 2009, the Council for Cultural Affairs (now the Ministry of Culture) announced that this sculpture was recognized as a national treasure. It is the first work of the 20th century to be on the current National Treasure List.

== Composition ==
This work represents a peaceful scene of traditional rural areas in Taiwan in the early years. The composition shows three shepherd boys and five buffaloes under plantains. The standing position of the shepherd boys and the inclination of the bamboo pole held by the child on the left form a stable triangular composition, breaking the monotonous parallel formed by the back of the buffaloes and the ground. In the composition, the bamboo hats imply sunshine and the banana leaves imply a gentle breeze. The naked shepherd boys, the bull buffaloes, and the lush weeds on the ground imply a rural atmosphere.
