= Pu Tiansheng =

Taiwanese sculptor

- 蒲添生
- Born: 19 June 1912; Chiayi, Taiwan
- Died: 31 May 1996 (aged 83); Taipei, Taiwan
- Other name: Pu Tian-shen
- Education: Asakura Fumio
- Alma mater: Kawabata Painting School; Imperial Art School (Musashino Art University); Asakura Sculpting Studio; Tokyo School of Fine Arts
- Occupation: Sculptor
- Known for: Founder of Taiwan's first bronze casting factory
- Notable work: Sun Yat-sen (sculpture) 國父孫中山(銅像); Poet (sculpture) 詩人 (銅像)
- Television: La Grande Chaumiere Violette 紫色大稻埕 (2016 TV series)
- Spouse: Chen Ziwei
- Awards: Gamecock (Glue Color painting) recipient of the Hsinchu Art Exhibition Prize. 鬥雞（膠彩畫作）新竹美展首獎；1925; Poet (composed in 1947) selected by the Salon des Artistes Français
Pu Tiansheng
- Traditional Chinese: 蒲添生
Transcriptions

Pu Tiansheng (or Pu Tian-shen, Chinese: 蒲添生, 19 June 1912–31 May 1996) was a well-known Taiwanese sculptor. He created Taiwan's first ever likeness of Sun Yat-sen, today on display in front of Taipei Zhongshan Hall. He was a pioneer of modern sculpture in Taiwan and founded Taiwan's first bronze-casting factory.

== Early life ==
Born into a family of traditional painters in 1912, Pu Tiansheng's father Pu Ying ran the Wenjin picture framing shop on Chiayi's Mei Street (renamed Chengren St. after the war). Pu Tiansheng's talents in painting were directly influenced by his childhood environment. At the age of fourteen, his glue color painting Gamecock (鬥雞) won first place at the Hsinchu Art Exhibition.

In 1929, Pu Tiansheng joined the Chun-Meng Painting Society established by his neighbor Lin Yushan and Pan Chunyuan, a painter from Tainan. Members of the Chun-Meng Painting Society group were devoted to the study of Oriental painting, and included artists such as Zhu Futing and Xu Qinglian.

== Education ==
In 1931, Pu Tiansheng went to study abroad in Japan, where he entered the Kawabata Painting School. He was admitted to the Japanese painting division of Imperial Art School (today's Musashino Art University) in the following year, and later transferred to the Sculpting division.

In 1934, Pu Tiansheng left school and entered the Asakura Sculpting Studio to continue his art studies. This private school was founded by the noted sculptor Fumio Asakura. Asakura also instructed Huang Tushui when Huang was studying in the graduate school at the Tokyo School of Fine Arts. Pu Tiansheng spent eight years at the Asakura Sculpture Studio and, in 1940, his work People of the Sea (海民) was selected for the 2600th Kōki Anniversary Art Exhibition (this was the Ministry of Education Art Exhibition, but the name of the event changed for this particular year in commemoration of the anniversary of the founding of Japan's Imperial line).

== Work and Public Life ==
In 1941, Pu Tiansheng returned to Taiwan and assisted in establishing the sculpting division of the Tai–Yang Art Exhibition. He also submitted his work "Wife" for the exhibition. In 1945, Pu and his family moved from Chiayi to Taipei and established Taiwan's first bronze casting factory. Through the introduction of his father-in-law Chen Cheng-po, he began to work on memorial images of government officials and created Taiwan's first ever likeness of Sun Yat-sen, today on display in front of Taipei Zhongshan Hall.

Pu Tiansheng also served as a juror for the Taiwan Provincial Art Exhibition and lectured on sculpting at the Provincial Education Building's Sculpting Seminar. He was a pioneer of modern sculpture in Taiwan, and his famous works included: Poet (詩人), his rendering of Lu Xun's contemplative pose; a female nude work entitled Light of Spring (春之光), selected for 1957 Japan Fine Art Exhibition (Nitten); and his work, Movement (運動系列), inspired by the female gymnastic movements.
