= Wang Sheng-hong =

Taiwanese writer

Wang Sheng-hong (Chinese: 王盛弘; born 1970) is a Taiwanese writer.

== Biography ==
Wang was born in Hemei village in Changhua County, Taiwan in 1970, growing up in a farming family with an illiterate mother and a father who only received basic education. Though his parents did not excel at explaining the world, their actions served as a model for honesty, warmth and kindness. As a youth, Wang enjoyed reading the works of Qi Jun and Yukio Mishima, and exchanged letters with the former for twenty years, discussing the giving and receiving among family and friends, as well as their shared love for various other topics. Meanwhile, the author Yukio sparked his interest in passion, immorality, and life and death.

Wang graduated from Darong Elementary School, Hemei Middle School, Changhua High School, the Mass Communications Department of Fu Jen Catholic University, and the Graduate School of Taiwanese Culture of the National Taipei University of Education. He has worked for a long time in media services, and was once awarded as an editor for newspaper supplements.

Wang moved north in 1988, keeping his roots firmly in the farm while exploring new possibilities in the city. Although he sought shelter in this new place, yet kept his home close to his heart. After finishing his mandatory military service in 1995, Wang worked in Taipei, where he felt like a seed that fell far from his tree, yet once he landed in this new fertile land, he gained confidence in himself and put down firm roots. In 2001 he packed up and traveled alone to England, France and Spain for almost three months, greatly expanding his worldview. In London’s Chelsea Physic Garden he discovered a Spanish pineapple hanging from dead wood, with no roots to nourish it, surviving on nothing but the moisture in the air. This inspired Wang, who then decided he wanted to become a true citizen of the world.

Wang is gay and often writes reflections on his sexuality in his work .

== Works ==
Although interested in literature, art, gardening, and observing every facet of society, Wang also takes pleasure in traveling and exploring the mysteries of nature. After returning to Taiwan, Wang wrote Walk Carefully (2-fishes Publishing Co, 2006) based on his travels, the first in his Triangular Prism trilogy. The book was widely acclaimed by scholars and readers alike, with Nan Fang-shuo stating, “I will not be miserly in recommending this book, as that would be simply impossible for me to do!”

Triangular Prism is like a series of concentric circles moving inward toward a core, describing Wang’s experiences and thoughts during his trip to Europe, his sentiments and history in Taipei, and his childhood before leaving far from home at the age of 18. In Keyword: Taipei (Marco Polo, 2008), the second book of the trilogy, Wang takes us to the 228 Peace Park, Jianguo Flower Market, Yangming Mountain, Yongkang Street, Dehui Street, Guling Street, Waishuang Creek, Danshui, Pingxi, and various night markets and gyms, drawing up a series of literary landmarks and woven stories.

== Awards ==
Wang’s favorite works are prose, and he was selected for the “Thirty Years of Elite Taiwan Literature: Thirty Prose Authors.” He has received over ten awards, including the Ling Rong San Literature Award (2007), the National Science Council Literature Prize (2006), the China Times Literature Award (2005), the Taipei Literary Works Scholarship (2002), the Ministry of Education Literary Achievement Award (2000), the Liang Shih-chiu Literary Award (1999, 1996) the Taiwan Provincial Literature Award (1998), the Huang Xi Literature Award (1998, 1997), the Taiwan Provincial Ministry of Education Literature and Arts Award (1998), the Wang Shi-fan Literature Prize (1997), and the Taiwan News Post Annual Author Prize (1996, 1995). In addition, he has also received numerous publishing and artistic subsidies from the National Culture and Arts Foundation. Wang’s works have been part of a wide variety of literary collections, and are used in general education courses in university and supplementary teaching materials for middle school.

== Bibliography ==
- Thirteen Cities (Marco Polo Publishing, 2010; Simplifed Chinese edition published by Longmen Bookstore of China, 2011)
- Keyword: Taipei (Marco Polo Publishing, 2008)
- Walk Carefully (2-fishes Publishing Co, 2006; Simplifed Chinese edition published by Longmen Bookstore of China, 2011)
- Take Me With You, Moonlight (Yi Fang Publishing, 2003)
- One Man (Elite Books, 2001)
- Herb Records (Wisdom Books, 2000; recommended by the Government Information Office for supplemental reading for elementary and middle school students, title later changed to City Gardener)
- Facades and Plain Colors (Chiu-Ko Publishing, 2000; title later changed to Stay, or Go Peach Blossoms Opening (Elite Books, 1998))
