= Liang Kai =

Chinese painter

Liang Kai (Chinese: 梁楷; pinyin: Liáng Kǎi; c. 1140 - c. 1210) was a Chinese painter of the Southern Song Dynasty. He was also known as Madman Liang because of his very informal pictures. He was born in Shandong and worked in Lin An (later Hangzhou). He is known to have studied with the master Jia Shigu. He was awarded the rank of Painter-in-Attendance at the court of Jia Tai (1201-1204 CE, Southern Song Dynasty) where he was known for mastery in painting figures, landscapes, and other minor subjects. He was also awarded the Golden Belt, however he left it behind when he left his position at court to practise Chan Buddhism.

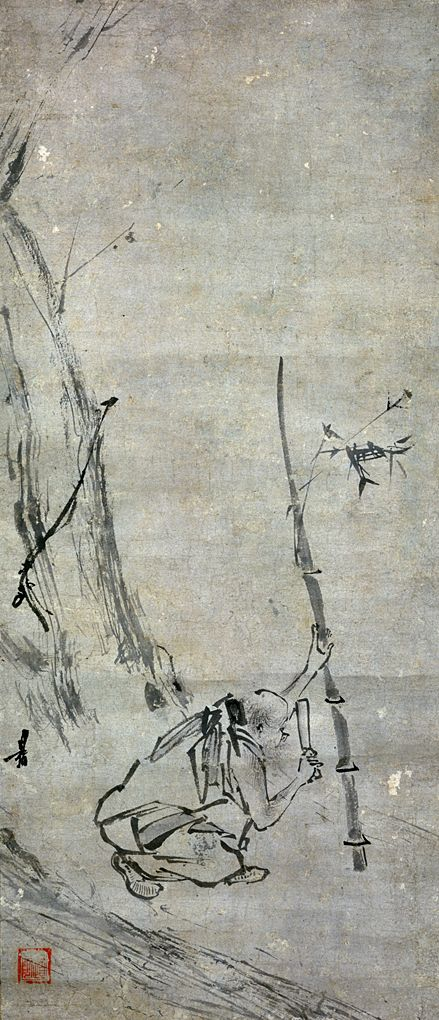
Sixth Chan Patriarch Chopping Bamboo, early 13th century. Hanging scroll, Tokyo National Museum.

== Painting style ==
Liang Kai is most famous for originating or developing the "Xie Yi" (sometimes translated as "sketch style") of painting, where the objective is to evoke the subject or atmosphere with minimal use of detail; it requires a profound mastery of painting technique and perfect concentration, but also allows for the beauty of accidental effects. The Xie Yi style is closely associated with the "sudden enlightenment", "mindfulness", and "spontaneity" aspects of this school of Buddhism. Works generally attributed to Liáng Kǎi include: painting of the poet Li Bai, the Drunken Celestial (A Sage), The Sixth Patriarch Cutting Bamboo, and in a more academic style, a series called the Eight Eminent Monks paintings.

The Sixth Chan Patriarch in particular exemplifies Chan Buddhism. It depicts Huineng, a Chan master, crouching as he chops bamboo. This follows the idea of mundane tasks taking on spiritual value in accordance with the philosophy. The painted scene shows the patriarch's "Chan moment" in which he finally attains enlightenment through the resonating sound of the blade. The holy figure is drawn scruffy and almost caricature-like. This was meant to suggest that he is free from worldly concerns like appearance and social status/expectation. In this deceptively simple painting, Liang uses pale and wet brushstrokes. However, several dark lines are scattered throughout, as seen in the vine growing around the tree on the left side of the image, and accents on Huineng's clothing. Liang's style of abbreviated, expressive painting, along with his ability to casually create compelling images is what made him famous among Chan monks.

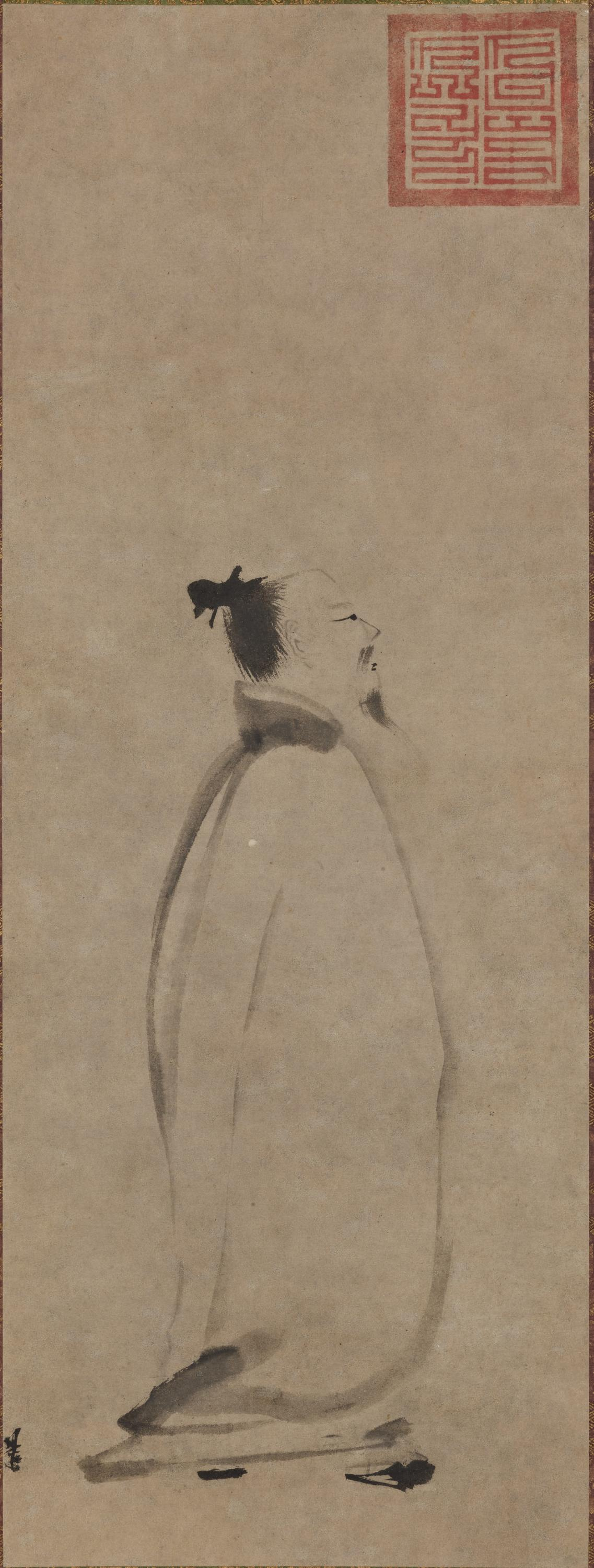
Li Bai Strolling

Drunken Celestial

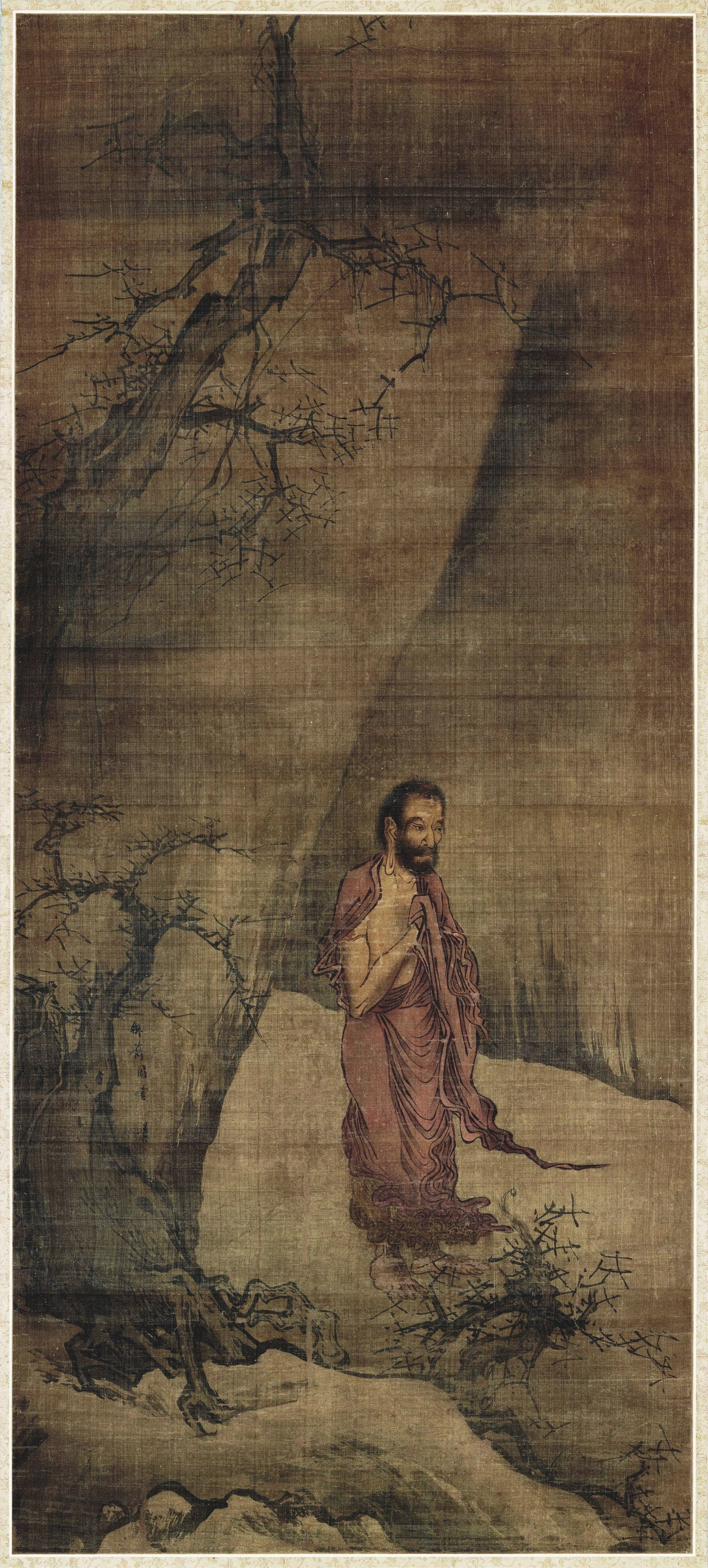
Shakyamuni Emerging from the Mountains

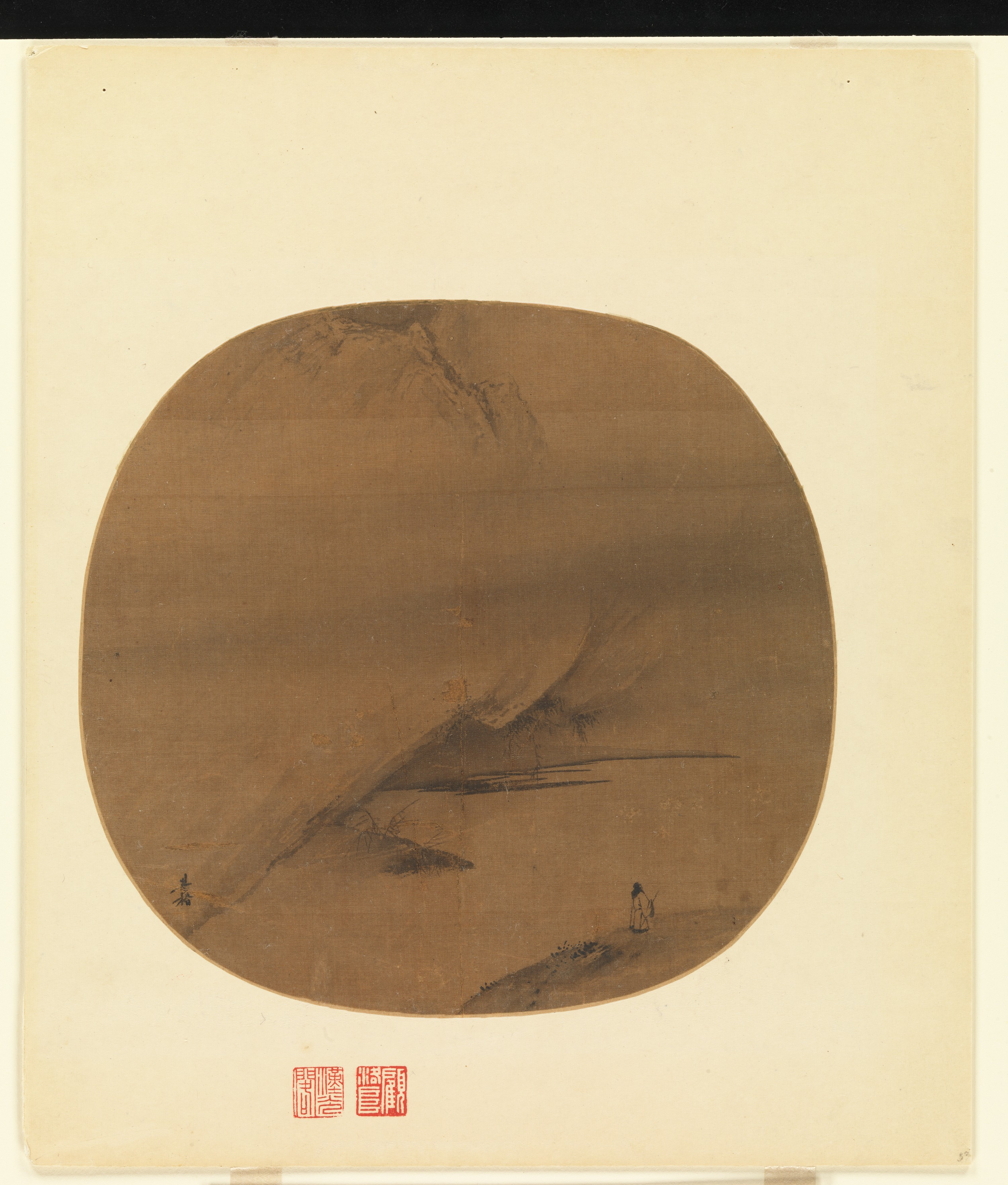
Poet strolling by a marshy bank

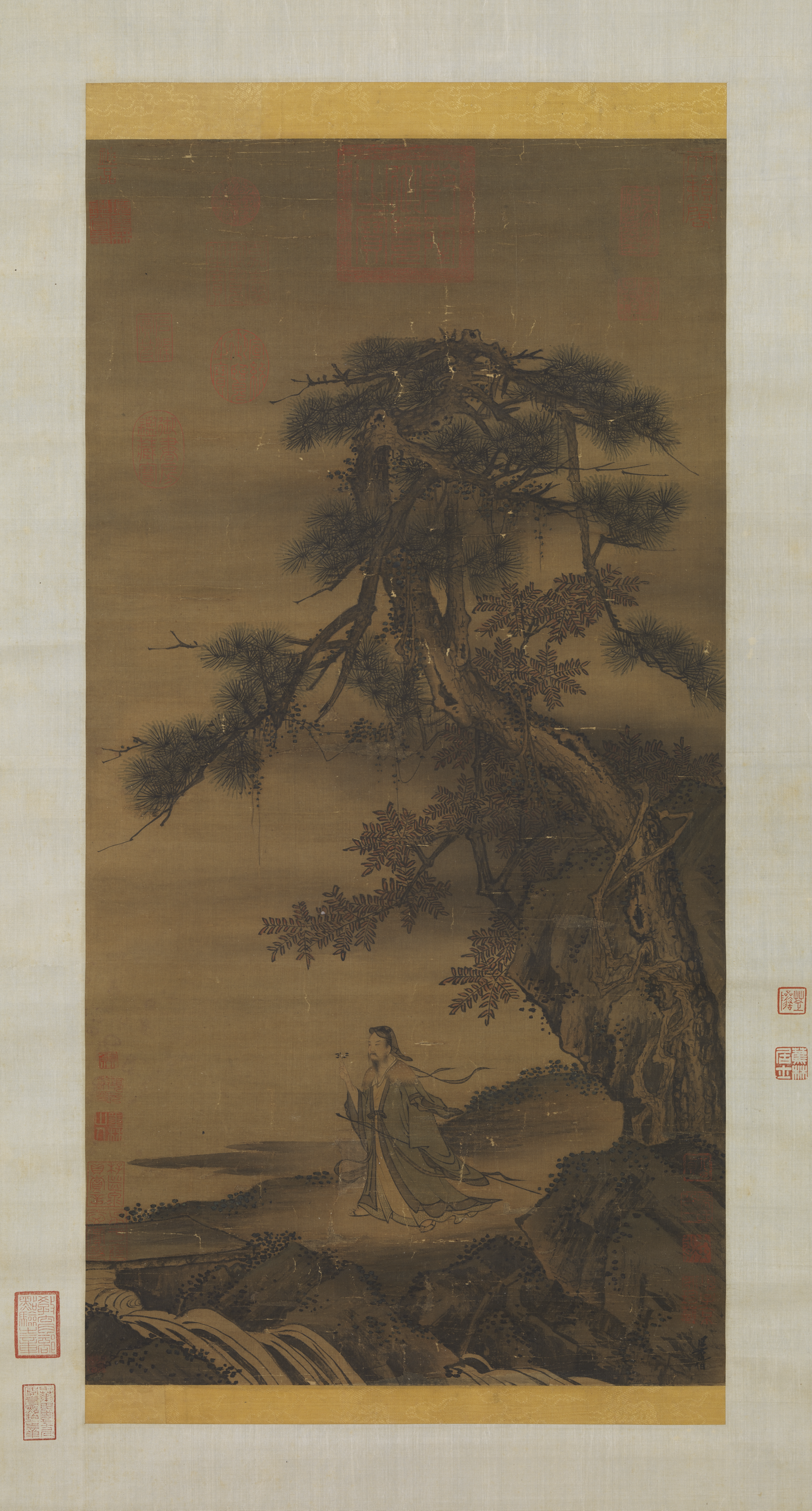
Gentleman of the Eastern Fence

== See also ==
- Shussan Shaka, a painting motif
