= Zhongshan Hall =

Auditorium in Taipei, Taiwan

Coordinates: 25.043148°N 121.510082°E

- 中山堂
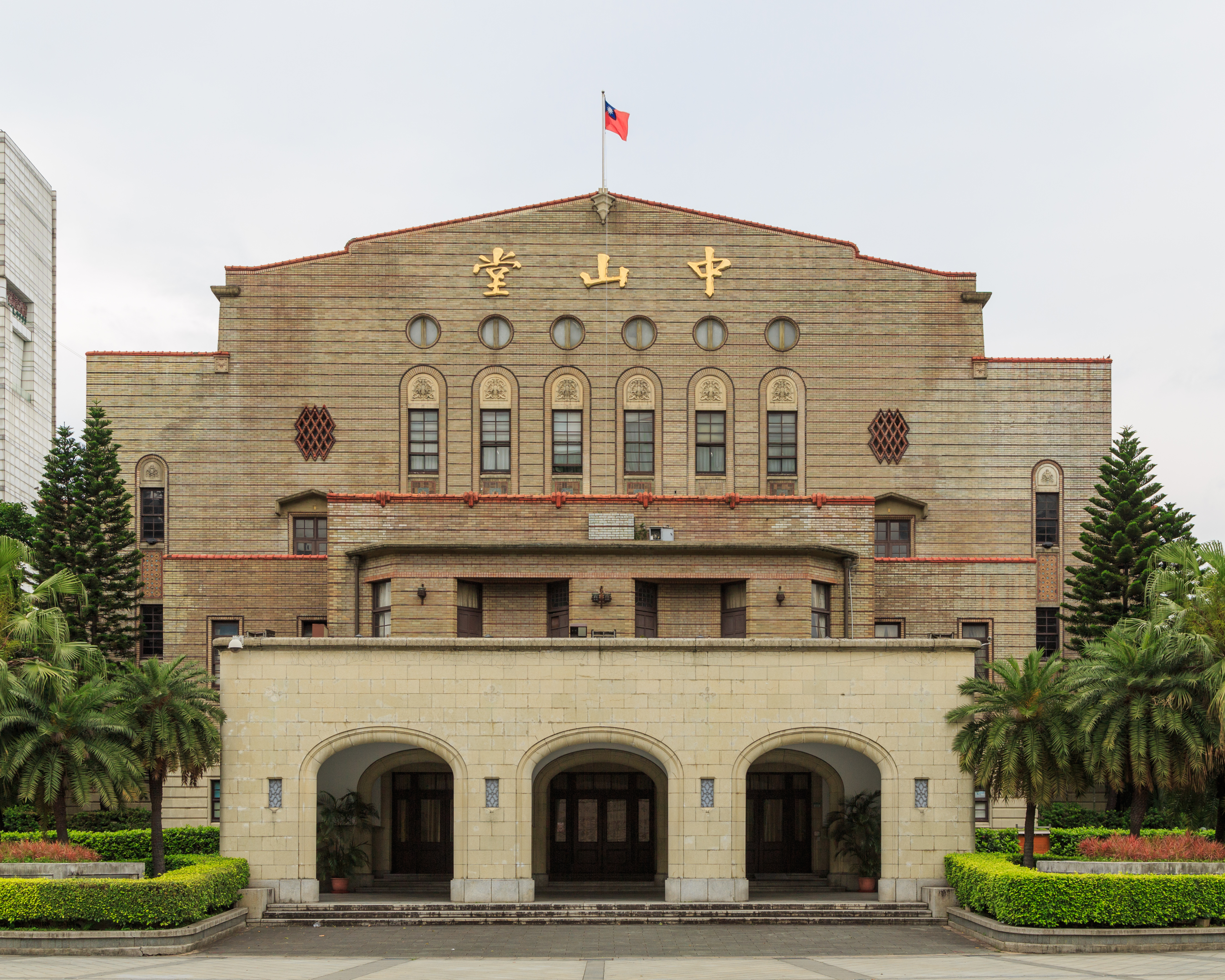
- The Zhongshan Hall facade
- Interactive map of the Zhongshan Hall area
- Former names: Taipei City Public Auditorium
- Alternative names: Chungshan Hall

General information
- Location: Zhongzheng, Taipei, Taiwan, No. 98, Yanping South Road; Zhongzheng District, Taipei City 10042; Taiwan
- Current tenants: Taipei City Government
- Construction started: 23 November 1932
- Completed: 26 November 1936

Technical details
- Floor count: 4
- Floor area: 113,750 square feet

Design and construction
- Architect: Ide Kaoru

Website
- english.zsh.gov.taipei (in English)

Zhongshan Hall (Chinese: 中山堂; pinyin: Zhōngshān Táng) is a historic building which originally functioned as the Taipei (Taihoku) City Public Auditorium (public hall). It is located at 98 Yanping South Road in the Ximending neighborhood of Zhongzheng District, Taipei, Taiwan. In 1992, it was recognized by the government as a historic site.

== History ==
As a tribute to mark the ascension of the Emperor Showa in 1928, the Japanese government in Taiwan dismantled the Qing dynasty government office in Taipeh (Taipei) and began the plan to erect the Taihoku City Public Auditorium (臺北公會堂, Taihoku Kōkaidō). Construction began on 23 November 1932 and was completed on 26 November 1936. Ide Kaoru, the main architect serving as chief engineer in Taiwan under the Japanese government, used the full cost of 980,000 yen and 94,500 workers.

The four-story steel structure of the building was designed to be fire-resistant and to withstand severe earthquakes and typhoons. The original building was faced in light green tile to make it less visible to aerial bombers. The windows are adorned with classical designs in a Spanish Islamic style. With 44,179 square feet (4,104.4 m^{2}) for the ground floor, the total area of the City Public Auditorium was 113,750 square feet (10,568 m^{2}), making it the fourth largest city Public Auditorium in Japan at that time. It was smaller than only the City Public Halls of Tokyo, Osaka, and Nagoya.

After Taiwan's handover to the Republic of China in 1945 after World War II, the Chief of the Taiwan Provincial Administrative Office, Chen Yi represented the Allies and accepted a formal surrender from the Japanese. The surrendering Japanese commander was Ando Rikichi, last Japanese Governor-General of Taiwan. The former Taihoku City Public Auditorium was renamed Chungshan (Zhongshan) Hall in honor of Sun Yat-sen and functioned as an official meeting place under the Chinese government. The hall was one of more than 125 public halls which pre-dated the KMT's takeover which were either demolished or renamed to Zhongshan Hall. In addition new halls built by the KMT on military bases and in state-owned enterprise factories were also named Zhongshan Hall.

Zhongshan Hall has always been one of the formal reception areas for welcoming foreign guests and diplomats. Former guests have included US President Richard Nixon, South Korean President Syngman Rhee, President of South Vietnam Ngo Dinh Diem, Philippine President Carlos P. Garcia, Iranian Shah Mohammad Reza Pahlavi, and others. Zhongshan Hall has also hosted memorial ceremonies such as the signing of the Sino-American Mutual Defense Treaty and three formal inauguration ceremonies of the second, third, and fourth presidency and vice-presidency of the Republic of China.

== Current use ==
The hall has several auditoriums currently used for arts performances such as chamber and orchestral music, traditional Chinese music, voice/choir, opera, dance, ceremonies, and exhibits.

- Zhongzheng Auditorium: This Grand Meeting Hall was the largest indoor meeting venue at the time, seating over 2,000 people since it was created on 27 December 1936. After World War II, it was the only concert hall in Taipei. Until Zhongshan Hall on Yangming Shan was completed in 1993, the National Assembly leased this hall. It is historic as Chiang Kai-Shek announced he would take office again and held his inaugural ceremony here.
- Guangfu Auditorium - The Grand Ballroom: Guangfu Auditorium is a two-story high rise hall with Islamic design and holds 500 people seated or 1,000 people unseated. This auditorium is historic as on 25 October 1945 it was the venue for the surrender ceremony of the Taiwan District of China warzone. The Japan and Republic of China governments signed the peace treaty here and the surrender of Japan was accepted here as well.
- Fortress Auditorium: In addition to indoor meeting areas, Zhongshan Hall was designed with a spacious plaza for outdoor activities. Speakers can stand on the second floor east balcony when addressing the audience on the plaza. Chiang Kai-Shek made four inaugural speeches here.
- Zhongshan Hall Square
- Taipei Lecture Hall

=== Notable features ===
- Sun Yat-Sen statue: In the plaza, there is a bronze statue of Sun Yat-Sen sculpted by Pu Tiansheng. Pu used a picture of Sun making a speech in Nagasaki, Japan in 1924 as a model for the sculpture. The unveiling took place on 10 October 1949
- Feet-Washing Basin: The feet-washing basin was used by people to wash the dust off their feet before entering public places such as the Taipei Public Meeting Hall in the Japanese Occupational Era.
- The Water Buffalo (水牛群像; Shuǐniú Qúnxiàng, 1930) by Huang Tu-shui is located on the central stairway between the second and third floor. The plaster relief was Huang's last work, measuring 5.55 by 2.50 meters, and portrays a southern state with tropical plants, Taiwanese buffaloes, and naked children with straw hats.

== Notable events ==
- Golden Horse Film Festival and Awards (3rd, 4th, 5th, 7th, 8th, 9th, 10th, 11th)
- Retrocession of Taiwan

== Transportation ==
Exit No. 5 of the Taipei Metro's Ximen Station provides access to the hall. There is also an underground parking lot.

== Gallery of images ==
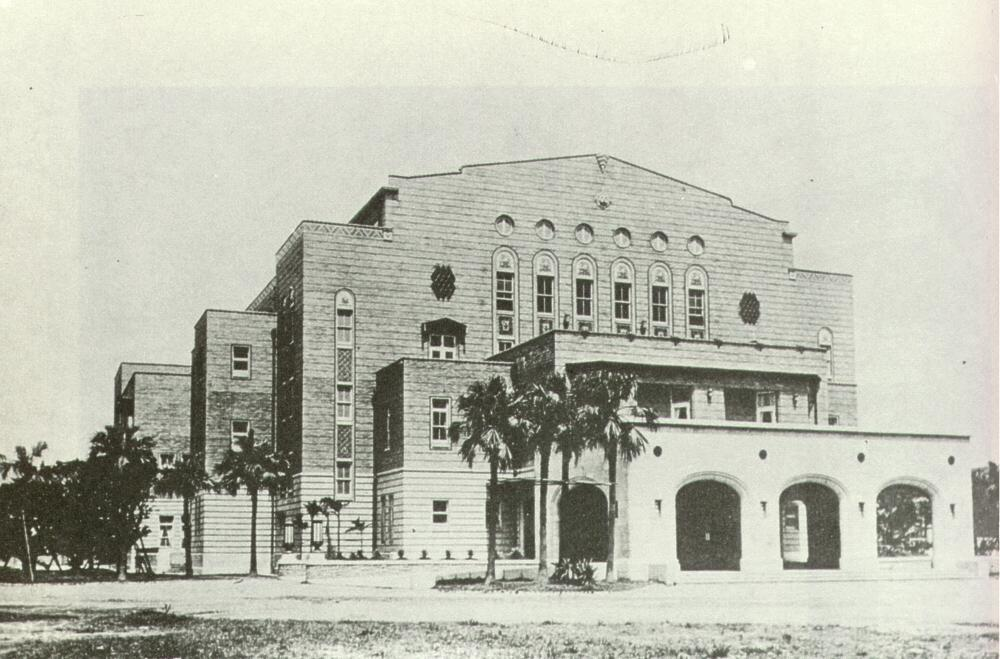
Taipei Zhongshan Hall as it appeared in 1940.

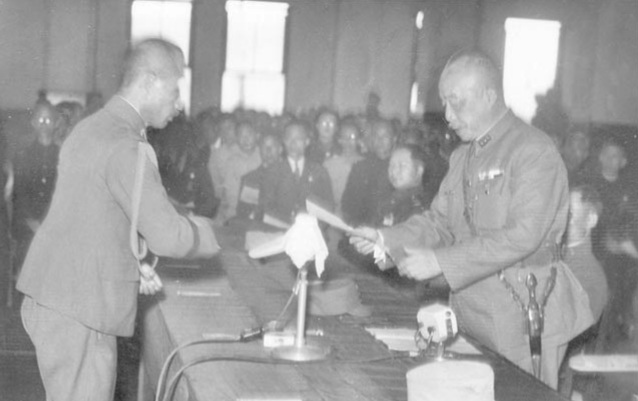
Chen Yi (right) accepting the acceptance receipt of Order No. 1 signed by Rikichi Andō (left), the last Japanese Governor-General of Taiwan, in Zhongshan Hall.

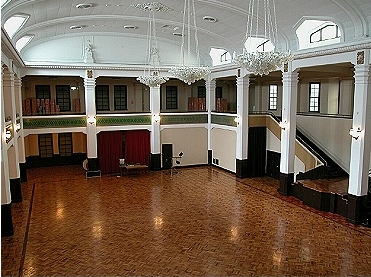
The Japanese Instrument of Surrender was signed in this room on 25 October 1945.

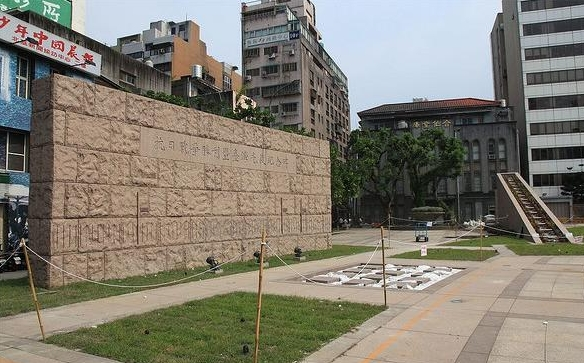
Resistance against Japan and Taiwan Retrocession Memorial Wall.

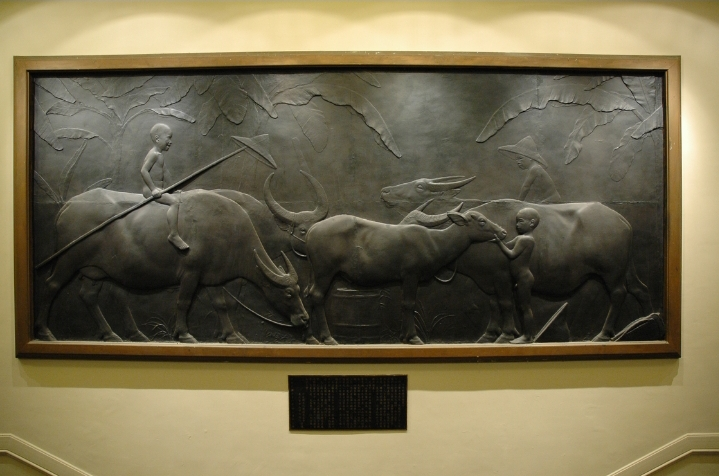
The Water Buffalo (水牛群像), completed in 1930 by Huang Tu-shui (1895–1930). Plaster cast.

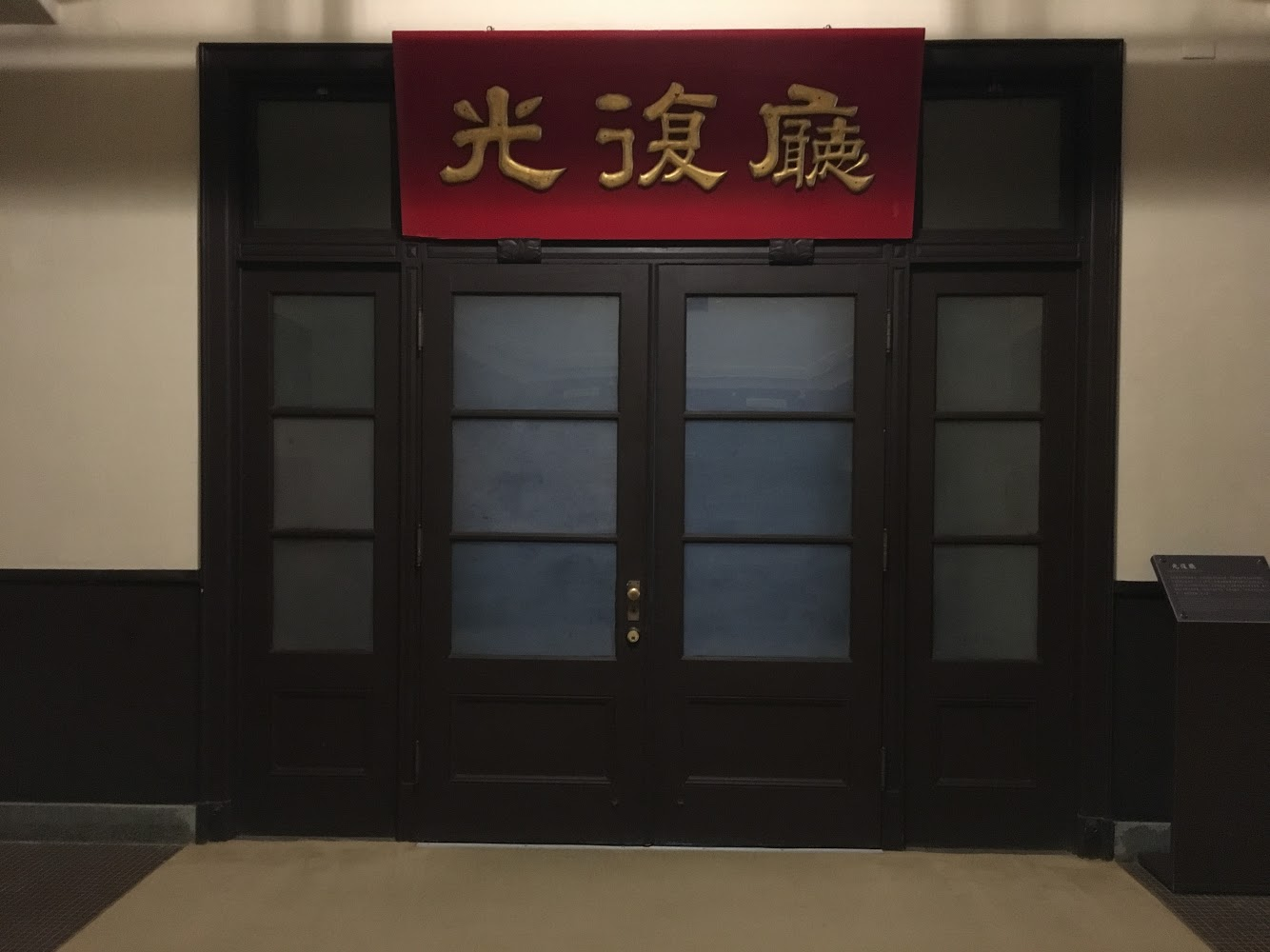
The entrance to Guangfu Auditorium.

Entrance to Zhongzheng Auditorium

Zhongshan Hall at night

== See also ==
- Retrocession Day
- Chung-Shan Building
- List of museums in Taiwan
- Nanjing Great Hall of the People
