= Wei Ch'ing-tê =

Wei Ch'ing-tê in his youth.

Wei Ch'ing-tê (Chinese: 魏清德;1887–1964), born in Hsinchu, Taiwan, with the courtesy name Jun An (潤庵) and pseudonyms Ai Ni Tzu (佁儗子) and Chih Tsun Yuan (尺寸園), was a journalist, writer, translator, and collector. He was honored as a poet laureate and his works have been compiled and published in eight volumes as The Complete Works of Wei Ch'ing-tê (魏清德全集) by the National Museum of Taiwan Literature.

Wei Ch'ing-tê, due to his long-term role as the editor-in-chief of Han Chinese and poetry at the largest official newspaper in Taiwan, Taiwan Daily News, made extensive use of the media's advantages and dedicated himself to promoting arts and culture. He wrote newspaper columns reviewing artists and introducing art pieces in calligraphy, paintings, inscriptions, the current state of book and painting collections, and the activities of both Chinese and Japanese literati.

During the beginning stage of Taiwan's movements of arts, he played a pivotal role in promoting, evaluating, and sponsoring artistic endeavors. He was quite an influencer in the literary community of Taiwan at the time.

== Works ==
Scholars frequently praised Wei Ch'ing-tê's performance in classical Chinese literature and language. He participated actively in numerous poetry societies and served as vice president of the largest poetry society in Taipei, Ying Poetry Society. Receiving recognition from literati in both Taiwan and Japan, he was also the only Taiwanese member of the Japanese Han poetry group Na-Ga Poetry Society.

However, most of his poetry was published in newspapers. Only a small portion was officially published. There was no formal publication of his essays or fiction. Therefore, there are a limited number of surviving works. These published poems often revolved around themes of landscapes, travel, and interpersonal interactions. Wei authored works including Man-hsien's Song and Verse Anthology (滿鮮吟草) and Jun-an Song and Verse Anthology (潤庵吟草).

Having received teacher training, he also possessed a significant understanding of Western thought, the developments of the New Literature Movement, and relevant contemporary issues. He published over a hundred articles in newspapers, many of which offered insightful commentary on Taiwan's reality and even delved into issues concerning the transmission and transplantation of modernity under Japanese colonial rule.

Additionally, Wei Ch'ing-tê wrote and translated more than twenty pieces of popular Chinese fiction for Taiwan Daily News and Han Chinese Taiwan Daily News (漢文臺灣日日新報). His adaptations of detective fiction, in particular, were distinctive and established him as an important writer of popular fiction during the Japanese rule period in Taiwan.
