= Shussan Shaka =

Subject in East Asian Buddhist art and poetry

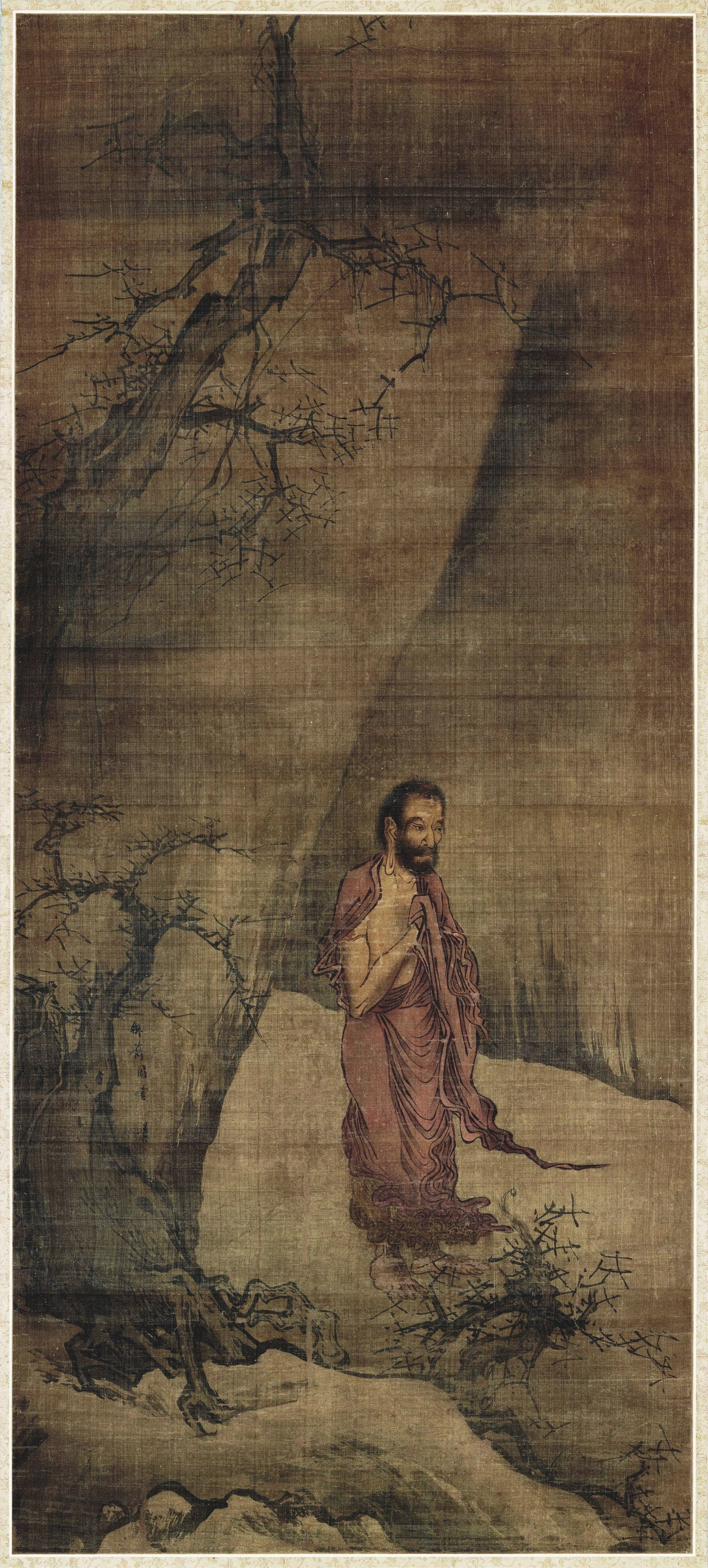
Liang Kai, Śākyamuni Descending the Mountain After Asceticism, Southern Song Dynasty (Chinese), 13th century, hanging scroll, ink and color on silk, 118.4 x 52.0 cm, Tokyo National Museum.

Shussan Shaka (Japanese: 出山釈迦 shussan shaka; Chinese: 出山釋迦 chūshān shìjiā; English: Śākyamuni Descending from the Mountain) is a subject in East Asian Buddhist art and poetry, in which Śākyamuni Buddha returns from six years of asceticism in the mountains, having realized that ascetic practice is not the path to enlightenment. The story of Shussan Shaka is an important subject in painting from both China and Japan, but rarely or never found in Buddhist art outside of East Asia, where a mountain retreat is not part of the story of this part of the Buddha's life.

According to the story, Śākyamuni, after leaving his palace, retreated into the mountains to seek enlightenment. Accompanied by five other ascetics, he meditated and fasted to a severe extent, his body becoming thin and emaciated. After six years, Sujata, a young girl, gave Śākyamuni a quantity of milk rice, which he ate. Once he made this decision to end his fast, the five people practicing asceticism with him were disappointed and left him. So, a solitary Śākyamuni descended the mountain, left the life of extreme austerity behind him, and traveled instead to Gaya, the city that would become known as the famous site of his enlightenment under the bodhi tree.

As a subject in art, Shussan Shaka is distinctive in its emphasis on the humanity of the historical Buddha, who in this and some other East Asian subjects is often given a beard, and a realistic, rather thin and dishevelled appearance, in contrast to traditional depictions of the Buddha in art. Key interpretive debates about paintings on this theme pivot on the question of whether the artist portrays Śākyamuni as enlightened or not.

== Origins ==
=== Emergence in China ===
Since different Buddhist traditions have different beliefs about Śākyamuni's journey to enlightenment, there is no universal version of the biography of the historical Buddha. The story of Shussan Shaka is not present in traditional Mahayana Buddhist texts or artwork, indicating that this part of Śākyamuni's biography was a Chan Buddhist innovation of the tenth century. While reference to Śākyamuni's six years of asceticism is present in the Buddhacarita, no mountain locale is mentioned in that text, and indeed the traditional locations for Śākyamuni's life after the Great Departure are all broadly in the Indo-Gangetic Plain, although the Vulture Peak in the Rajgir Hills in Bihar was a favourite place in his later life. The mountain setting was likely of Chinese origin because in Chinese Buddhism, Daoism, and Confucianism alike, mountains are believed to be holy places, and Daoist sages in particular often retreated to mountains for meditation.

Shussan Shaka was popularized as a subject in painting in the thirteenth century during the Chinese Song Dynasty (960–1279), the period during which Chan reached its height in China. It became a particularly prevalent feature of paintings produced in the Chan temples of Zhejiang Province. The artist credited with initiating this motific tradition is the Northern Song literatus Li Gonglin (1049–1106). Though not extant, Li Gonglin's Shussan Shaka is referenced in inscriptions on other Shussan Shaka paintings, which have led scholars to this conclusion. Li's painting style involved fine lines and precise brushwork. In general, Chinese paintings of Shussan Shaka followed one of two styles: the first was the traditional Chinese style that featured color, thin outlines, and detailed depictions of figure and landscape, while the second was the characteristically Zen style of monochrome painting, thicker lines with a 'spontaneous' quality, and fewer landscape elements. The former was the earlier style, common in the Song Dynasty, while into the Yuan Dynasty (1271–1368) it was the latter style that prevailed.

=== Transmission to Japan ===
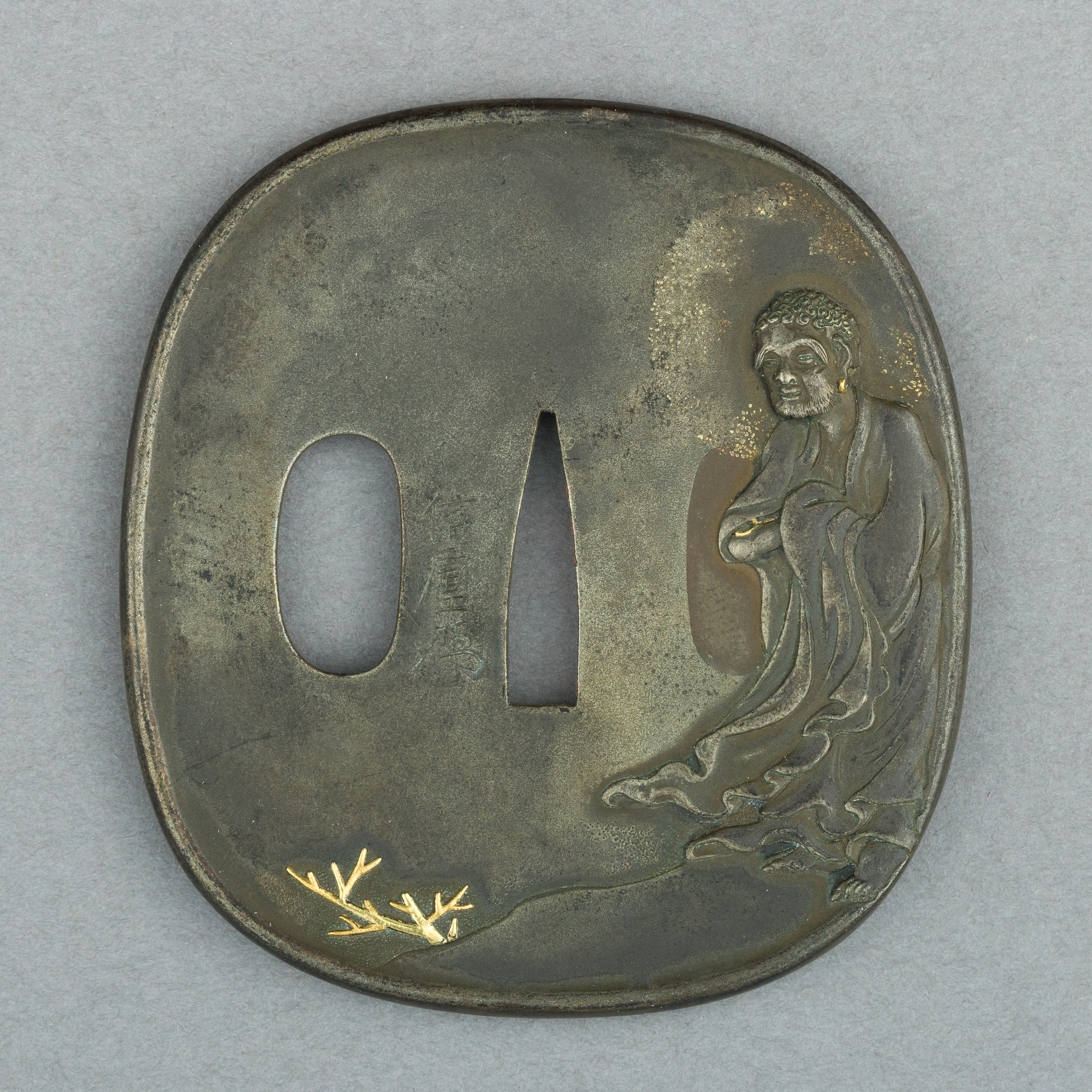
Japanese tsuba (sword guard), Edo Period

Chan Buddhism was transmitted from China to Japan (where it is known as Zen) during the thirteenth century, along with the unique styles and motifs of the Chan painting tradition. For example, in the fourteenth century, the famous Shussan Shaka by Chinese painter Liang Kai (ca. 1140-ca. 1210) was transported by Zen monks to Japan, where it inspired later Japanese paintings. Hence, early Japanese renditions of Shussan Shaka were based closely on Chinese models. Since Japanese priests were often the ones transporting paintings back to their home country, Chinese Shussan Shaka paintings often ended up in Japanese monasteries, and subsequent copies or imitations were created in monastery ateliers. In Japan, Shussan Shaka became particularly associated with the Rinzai sect of Zen Buddhism and saw more prolonged popularity as a painting subject than in China, even into the Edo Period. In Japan, unlike in China, this Zen painting motif was on rare occasions translated to other forms of art, such as print illustration and sculpture.

== Significance ==
=== Role in Early Chan/Zen ===
Though part of a broader tradition in Buddhist art and literature across Asia of depicting Śākyamuni during his years of asceticism, the story of Shussan Shaka in particular is unique to Zen. Typically, Zen spurned iconographic depictions of Buddhist deities as seen in the art of other sects. However, early Zen placed great emphasis on the centrality of Śākyamuni Buddha, whose role had become downplayed in recent Mahayana Buddhism. This emphasis was tied to the task of establishing an authoritative Zen patriarchal lineage traceable all the way back to the historical Buddha. Hence, according to Helmut Brinker and Hiroshi Kanazawa, the chief function of the motif of Shussan Shaka is to demonstrate "Śākyamuni's role as earthly religion founder." For this reason, portrayals of Śākyamuni descending the mountain after asceticism generally call viewers' attention to the human frailty of this important figure, grounding him in the earthly as opposed to deifying him. Śākyamuni appears starved and tired, his body is gaunt and bony, and his face may bear a dismayed expression. He is also commonly depicted as a monk.

In addition to its relevance to lineage claims, Shussan Shaka also reflects important beliefs and practices of the Zen religious tradition. For instance, Śākyamuni's weariness as he walks down from the mountain suggests that enlightenment does not come easily. The solitariness of Śākyamuni's descent reflects Zen teaching about the importance of individual spirituality and solitary meditation. At the same time, his return to society after retreating to the mountains may also suggest that self-realization is fostered by living in community with others. That Śākyamuni's hands are always concealed by the folds of his robe rather than forming a mudra resonates with the Zen Buddhist virtue of wordlessness. Finally, the narrative of the story itself in conjunction with artists' emphasis on earthliness suggests, in accordance with Zen teaching, that enlightenment is not found by completely cutting off oneself from the world.

Historically, paintings on this motif had a relatively small audience, circulating among the overlapping networks of literati elites and Chan monks. In ritual use, Shussan Shaka paintings are hung on the walls of Rinzai Zen temples during the holiday celebrating the enlightenment of Śākyamuni Buddha. Seven days of meditation begin on the eighth day of the twelfth month, at the conclusion of which an image of Shussan Shaka is displayed and the mantra of Great Compassion said before it. This practice suggests that Śākyamuni's years of asceticism and self-denial in the mountains are indeed tied to his enlightenment in the religious understanding of these Zen practitioners.

=== Interpretive debates ===
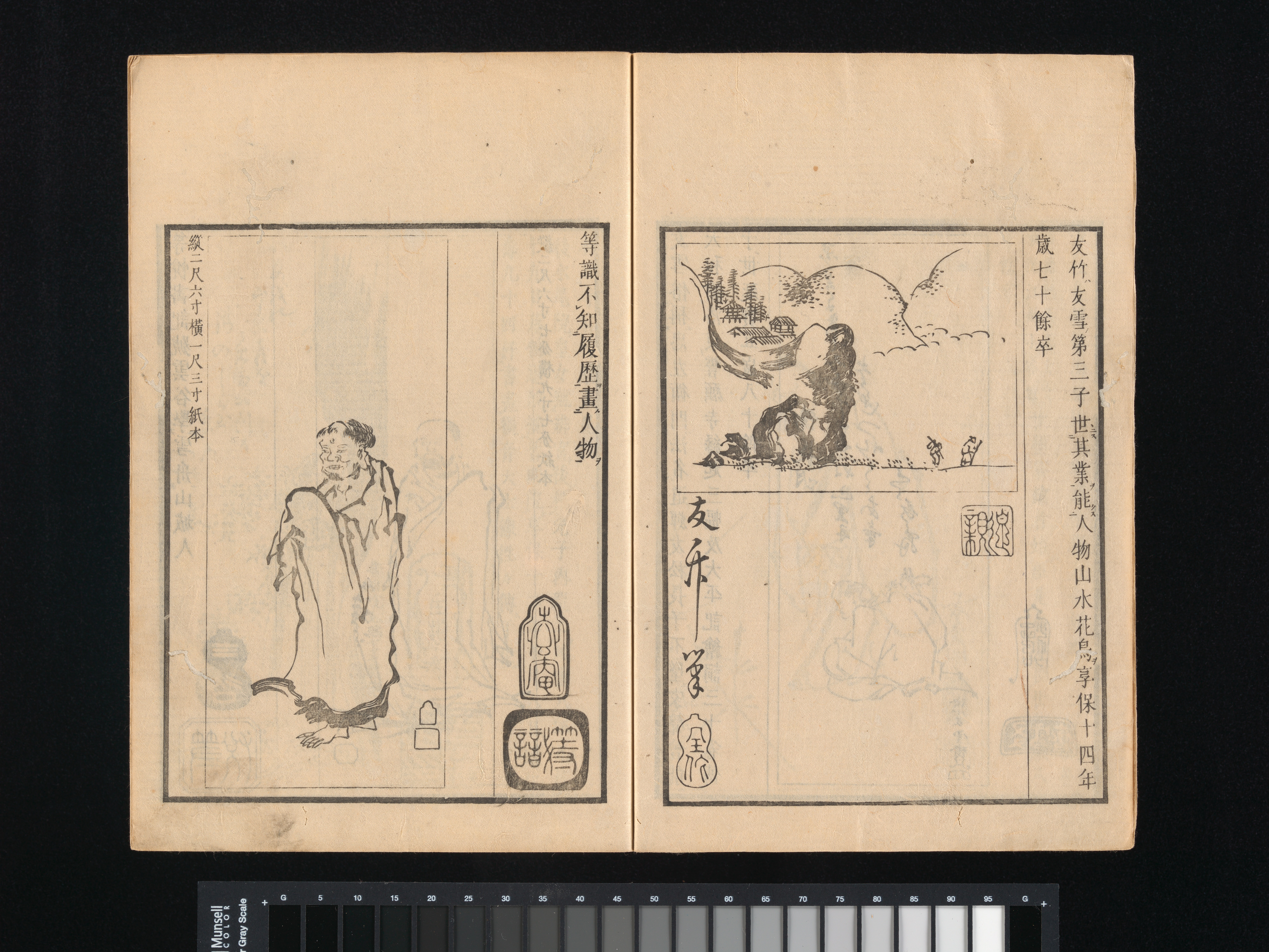
Japanese book illustratiion, 1809

In interpreting Chinese and Japanese paintings of Shussan Shaka, a key question for scholars is whether the Śākyamuni depicted is the already enlightened Buddha or simply a man disillusioned with austerities but yet to become the "enlightened one." Among scholars, two opposing schools of thought persist on this issue. However, Zen adherents tend to favor the former view: that Śākyamuni attained enlightenment during his time in the mountains. This would suggest that Śākyamuni is portrayed as a bodhisattva, forestalling nirvana and descending from the mountain to assist others on the path to enlightenment. In light of this reading, Śākyamuni's subsequent meditation and what is conventionally understood as his enlightenment under the bodhi tree at Gaya then also poses an interpretive challenge to scholars.

Although Shussan Shaka paintings indeed present viewers with the emaciated frame of a distinctly human Śākyamuni, the question of enlightenment is complicated by the presence in some paintings of symbols and iconography indicating holiness. Some artists paint Śākyamuni with a halo, an uṣṇīṣa, or an urna, each of which may signify enlightenment. In Japanese Shussan Shaka paintings, the baldness on top of Śākyamuni's head can also represent an uṣṇīṣa. Most Chinese Shussan Shaka paintings do not feature a halo, which scholars therefore understand as primarily a Japanese innovation. Apart from the use of religious symbols, poetic inscriptions also animate discussions on the enlightened status of Śākyamuni in a given painting. For instance, according to Helmut Brinker, the following colophon by the Zen master Zhongfeng Mingben (1263–1323) suggests an interpretation of Shussan Shaka as an enlightened Buddha returning to the world to spread his wordless teaching:

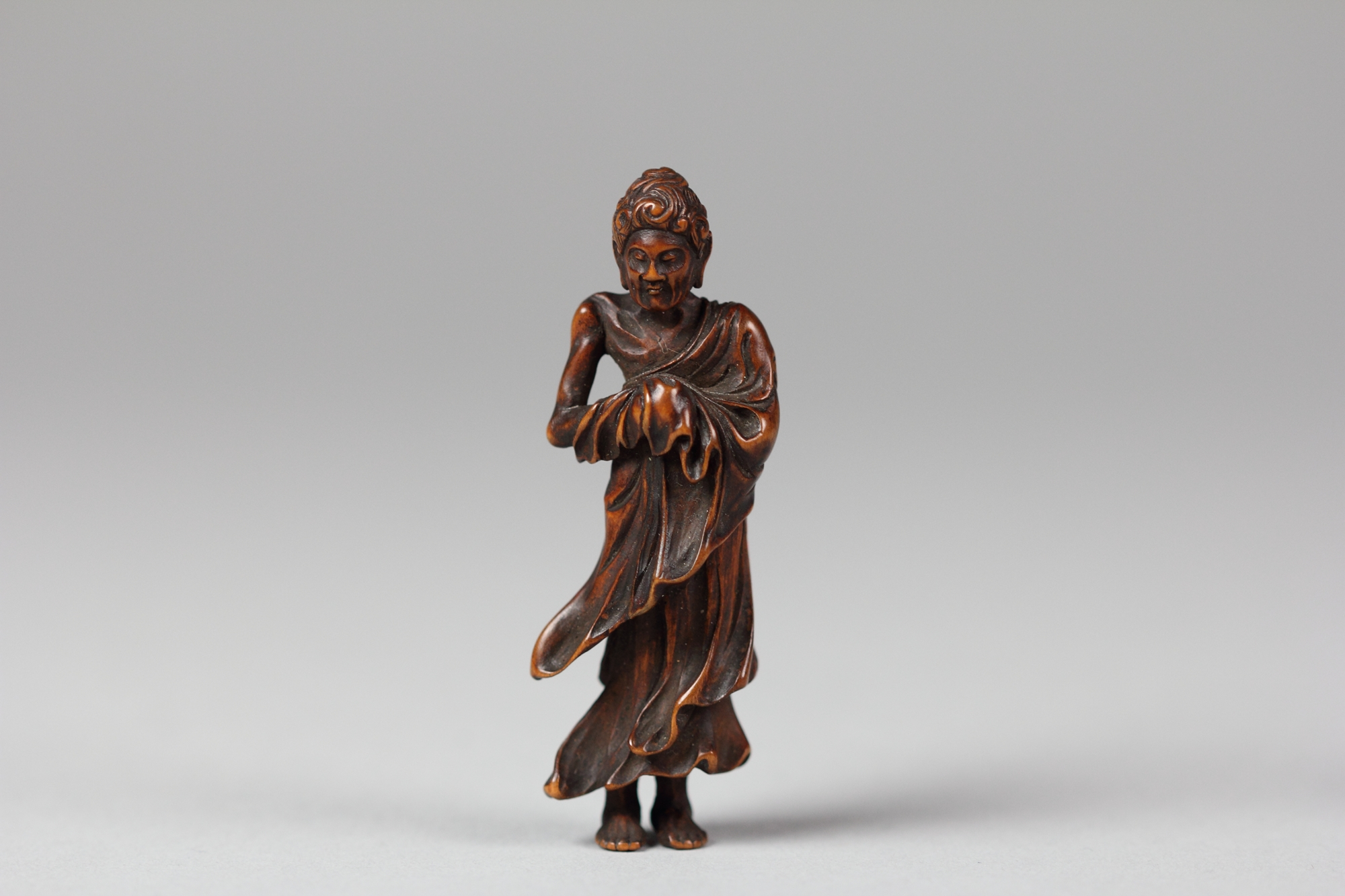
19th-century wood netsuke

He who emerges from the mountains and has entered the mountains:
That is originally You.
If one calls him "You"
It still is not he.
The venerable master Shijia (Śākyamuni) comes.
Ha, ha, ha...! He glances over ten million miles of billows.
Huanzhu Mingben salutes with respectfully folded hands.

— Zhongfeng Mingben

While some Zen masters' inscriptions situate them in the same camp as Mingben, Brinker suggests that still others favor the alternative reading of Shussan Shaka as a portrait of a man still seeking self-realization, or at least to cast doubt on the completeness of his enlightenment. One example is the following colophon by Songyuan Chongyo (1132–1202):

At midnight he passed over the city wall
With the beauty of a dragon and the air of a phoenix.
He got loose from foolery and let go silliness.
[But] the Honorable [Śākyamuni] was not aware of it.
The day he came out of the mountains [because] he
could no [longer] bear hunger and cold,
He forcibly spoke of the six years as the time of completing his way.

— Songyuan Chongyo

== In Chinese painting ==
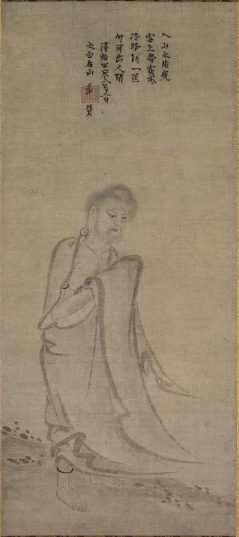
Śākyamuni Emerging from the Mountains, Southern Song Dynasty (Chinese), 1244, hanging scroll, ink on paper, 166.37 x 49.85 cm, Cleveland Museum of Art.

=== Liang Kai's Shussan Shaka ===
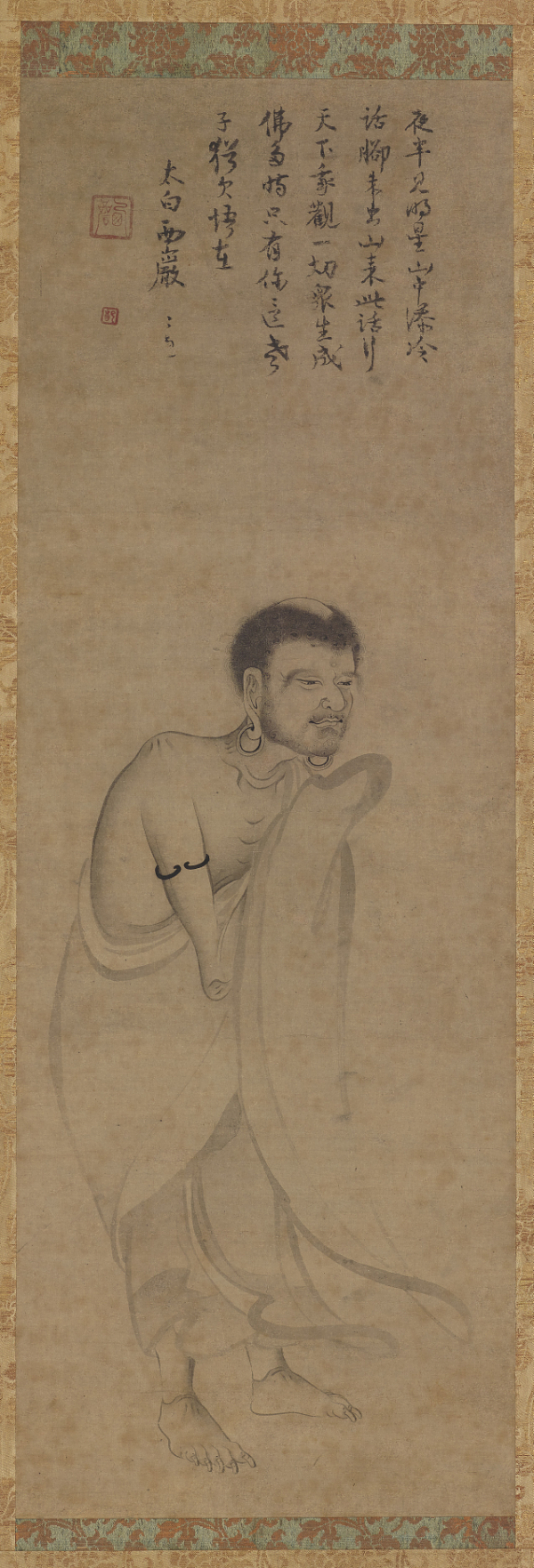
Traditionally attributed to Hu Zhifu, Śākyamuni Emerging from the Mountains, Southern Song Dynasty, mid 13th century, hanging scroll, ink on paper, 92 x 31.7 cm, Freer Gallery of Art.

Liang Kai's Śākyamuni Descending the Mountain After Asceticism, from the first half of the 13th century and now in the Tokyo National Museum, is one of the oldest extant Shussan Shaka paintings, and the most famous. Produced under the patronage of Emperor Ningzong or Emperor Lizong of the Southern Song dynasty, it is a classic example of a Shussan Shaka in the Chinese orthodox style. There is no inscription on this painting other than the artist's signature, which identifies him as "Painter-in-Attendance" at the Imperial Academy.

Liang Kai was not a Zen monk painter, but after he abandoned his position at the Imperial Academy and turned to a lifestyle of heavy drinking, his portraits came to suggest influences of the Chan painting tradition. Since his Shussan Shaka pre-dates this move, however, it bears the mark of his earlier work: a carefully planned and executed "academic" style. According to the analysis of Hiroshi Kanazawa, Liang Kai's Shakyamuni Descending the Mountain After Asceticism presents the viewer with an as yet unenlightened Śākyamuni.

=== The Cleveland Shussan Shaka ===
The painting of Shussan Shaka at the Cleveland Museum of Art is the oldest extant ink monochrome rendition of this theme. Although its artist is unknown, the work is based on the style of the painter Li Que. A member of the Southern Song literati who interacted closely with Chan priests, Li Que had in turn studied Liang Kai's later work, and was known for his spontaneous painting style.

Although depicting the same subject, the Cleveland Shussan Shaka differs radically in style from Liang Kai's version. In contrast to Liang Kai's Shussan Shaka, the Cleveland version includes only the ground and no other landscape elements. There is also much sparser detail on Śākyamuni's face and body. The artist has employed mostly light, washy ink tonalities with some dark details for an effect known as "apparition painting."

The Cleveland Shussan Shaka bears an inscription attributed to the Zen priest Chijue Daochong, (1170–1251), which reads:

Since entering the mountain, too dried out and emaciated
Frosty cold over the snow,
After having a twinkling of revelation with impassioned eyes
Why then do you want to come back to the world?

— Chijue Daochong

In Brinker's view, Chijue Daocheng's poem exhibits an interpretation of this image as a portrait of the Buddha returning to society having already attained enlightenment, or "revelation," in the mountains. However, Carla M. Zainie notes that Chijue Daochong's tone of questioning leaves this point open to debate.

=== The Freer Shussan Shaka ===
Scholars date the Chinese Shussan Shaka painting at the Freer Gallery of Art between 1239 and 1260, most likely close to 1250. This painting of Śākyamuni Emerging from the Mountains has been dubiously attributed to Hu Zhifu, a man about whom little historical information is available.

This monochrome Shussan Shaka is characteristic of Chan painting style in the late-Southern Song and Yuan Dynasties. While the work overall appears very carefully composed and executed, the fine detail of Sakyamuni's face and body is juxtaposed with the less meticulous character of his robes. The painter of the Freer Shussan Shaka went yet further than the painter of the Cleveland Shussan Shaka by eschewing background and landscape elements altogether.

The painting bears an inscription by Xiyan Liaohui (1198–1262), a Chan abbot originally from Sichuan. Xiyan Liaohui's inscription, brushed in the "running script" style and emulating the hand of Wuzhun Shifan, reads:

At midnight he saw the morning star.
In the mountains his cold words had increased.
Before his feet emerged from the mountains
These words were running through the world:
"I see that all living [creatures] are completed into Buddhas since some time.
There is only You, old fellow, who is still lacking complete Enlightenment.

— Wuzhun Shifan

Helmut Brinker characterizes the tone of this colophon as "desperate" and "despairing," belying "frustration" and "discontent," presenting to the reader a Śākyamuni who has not yet reached his goal.

== In Japanese painting ==
=== The Seattle Shussan Shaka ===
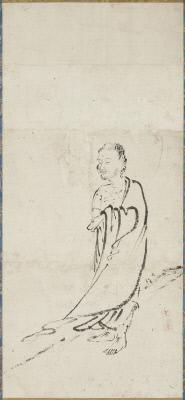
Śākyamuni Descending the Mountain, late 13th century (Japanese), hanging scroll, ink on paper, 90.8 x 41.9 cm, Seattle Art Museum.

This anonymous work housed at the Seattle Art Museum is the earliest known Japanese Shussan Shaka painting in existence today. It is a 13th century Japanese painting based on a 12th century Chinese prototype. In turn, this important painting was used as a model for subsequent versions in Japan. A seal on the Seattle Shussan Shaka, along with its style and materials, associates it with the painting workshops of Kozanji, a monastery in Kyoto.

This Shussan Shaka has the simple, abbreviated quality of a sketch. Like the Cleveland Shussan Shaka, the only landscape element depicted on this hanging scroll is the ground on which Śākyamuni walks.

=== The Choraku-ji Shussan Shaka ===
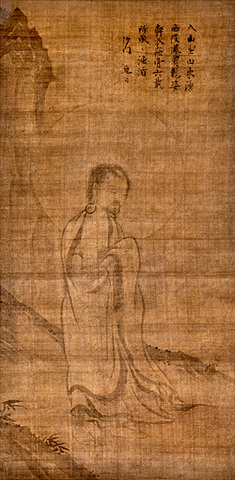
Shussan Shaka, Nambokucho Period (Japanese), 14th century, hanging scroll, ink on silk, 72.7 x 36.1 cm, Choraku-ji Collection, Japan.

Although the artist of the Choraku-ji Shussan Shaka is unknown, the style of the painting leads scholars to infer that the creator of this work was a Zen priest rather than a trained painter.

While Hiroshi Kanazawa posits that this portrait of Shussan Shaka is modeled after Liang Kai's famous rendition, Carla M. Zainie suggests it is evidently inspired by the Cleveland Shussan Shaka, to which it also bears stylistic similarities. For instance, the monochrome Choraku-ji painting is characterized by variations in ink tonality and dynamically modulated brushstrokes like the Cleveland version.

The inscriber of this work was also a Zen priest, identified as Dongming Huizhi (Japanese: Tōmyō E'nichi), who lived from 1272–1340. In 1309, this priest of Chinese origin relocated to Japan, where he went on to establish a monastery in Kamakura. His inscription reads:

He enters the mountains and returns from the mountains. In the East it flows rapidly, in the West it disappears. He has the bearing of a Phoenix and the manner of a Dragon. He is draped in silk, but emaciated to the bone. This is what he achieved in six years of asceticism: He became utterly confused.

According to Helmut Brinker, Huizhi's emphasis on Śākyamuni's state of confusion suggests that the man in the painting has not yet achieved self-realization. Yet, Carla M. Zainie suggests that Huizhi's colophon remains open to interpretation due to the fact that "confused" could alternatively be taken to signify a kind of spiritual revelation.

=== Mori Sosen's Shussan Shaka ===
The motif of Shussan Shaka saw renewed popularity in art and worship during the Edo Period (1603–1868), when Zen painting came to exert its influence on broader Japanese art and culture. Hence, Mori Sosen's Shaka Descending from the Mountains at the Nelson-Atkins Museum of Art constitutes not only an example of a much later (ca. 1800) Shussan Shaka painting, but also a significant divergence in composition and style from conventional representations of this motif. It may be inspired by an earlier Shussan Shaka from the Kano School.

The artist Mori Sosen was not a Zen monk but rather a professional "town painter" supported by patronage. He is most well known for his realistic paintings of monkeys, which artistic background Patricia J. Graham suggests allowed him to bring an element of playfulness to the religious subject matter of Shussan Shaka. His portrayal of Śākyamuni in a humble and somewhat whimsical manner suggest the influence of the iconoclastic strain of Zen art. Like its predecessors, Mori Sosen's Shussan Shaka stresses the humanity and ordinariness of the historical Buddha. In her analysis, Graham suggests that this resonates with the egalitarian quality of Zen beliefs about universal buddha-nature and the accessibility of enlightenment.

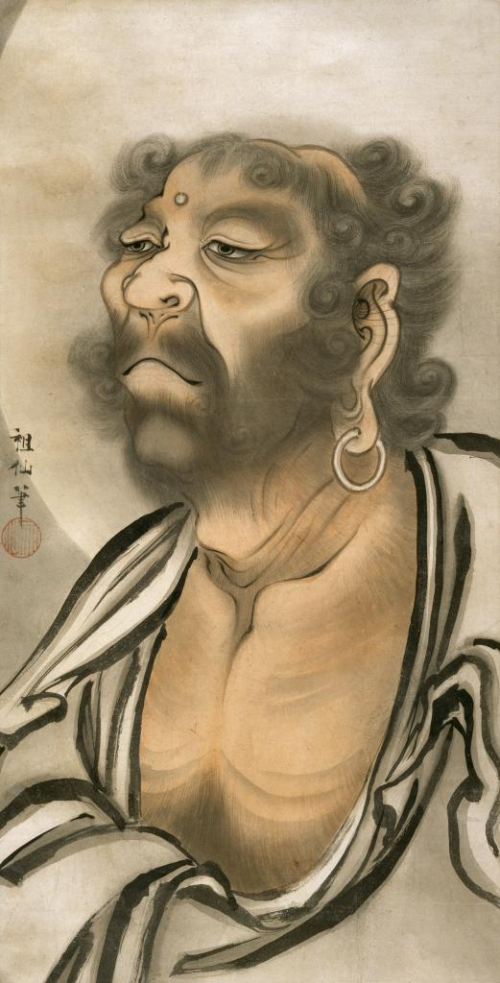
Mori Sosen, Shaka Descending from the Mountains, ca. 1800, hanging scroll, ink and light color on paper, 106.68 x 54.93 cm, Nelson-Atkins Museum of Art.

== Bibliography ==
- Brinker, Helmut. "Shussan Shaka in Sung and Yüan Painting." Arts Orientalis 9 (1973): 21–40.
- Brinker, Helmut. "Zen Masters in Words and Images." Art of Japan: Paintings, Prints and Screens: Selected articles from Orientations 1984–2002, 195–204. Hong Kong: Orientations Magazine, Ltd., 2002.
- Brinker, Helmut and Hiroshi Kanazawa. "Themes and Genres of Zen Painting: The Historical Buddha Sakyamuni." Zen: Masters of Meditation in Images and Writings, trans. Andreas Lesinger, 131–135. Zurich: Artibus Asiae, 1997.
- Cummings, Mary. "Austerities." The Lives of the Buddha in the Art and Literature of Asia., 153–161. Ann Arbor: University of Michigan Center for South and Southeast Asian Studies, 1982.
- Graham, Patricia J. "Professional Icon-Makers." Faith and Power in Japanese Buddhist Art, 1600–2005, 127–249. Honolulu: University of Hawaii Press, 2007.
- Kanazawa, Hiroshi. "Shaka Descending the Mountain." Japanese Ink Painting: Early Zen Masterpieces, trans. Barbara Ford, 84–87. Tokyo: Kodansha International Ltd., 1979.
- Kuwayama, George. "The Buddha Image in China." Light of Asia: Buddha Sakyamuni in Asian Art, ed. Pratapaditya Pal, 165–174. Los Angeles: Los Angeles County Museum of Art, 1984.
- Pal, Pratapaditya. "The Legendary Life of Buddha Sakyamuni." Light of Asia: Buddha Sakyamuni in Asian Art, ed. Pratapaditya Pal, 37–128, but mainly 96-100. Los Angeles: Los Angeles County Museum of Art, 1984.
- Poster, Amy G. "The Buddha Image in Japan." Light of Asia: Buddha Sakyamuni in Asian Art, ed. Pratapaditya Pal, 183–250. Los Angeles: Los Angeles County Museum of Art, 1984.
- Zainie, Carla M. "Sources for Some Early Japanese Ink Paintings." The Bulletin of the Cleveland Museum of Art 65, no. 7 (Sep., 1978): 232–246.
