= Surfing at the 2026 Asian Games – Women's shortboard =

Women's shortboard at the 2026 Asian Games
- Venue: Long Beach, Tahara
- Date: 25–29 September 2026
- Competitors: 21 from 12 nations

Medalists
gold medal	Mirai Ikeda	Japan
silver medal	Yang Siqi	China
bronze medal	Minami Nonaka	Japan

The women's shortboard competition at the 2026 Asian Games took place from 25 to 29 September 2026 at Long Beach in Tahara, Aichi Prefecture, Japan. Surfing made its debut as an official Asian Games sport at the Aichi–Nagoya Games, and the men's and women's shortboard events also served as qualifiers for the 2028 Summer Olympics in Los Angeles.

Japan's Mirai Ikeda won the gold medal, defeating China's Yang Siqi 11.64 to 7.57 in the gold medal match, securing a provisional quota place for Japan at the 2028 Olympics. Yang's silver was China's first-ever Asian Games medal in surfing. The bronze medal went to Ikeda's compatriot Minami Nonaka, who beat Indonesia's Jasmine Michelle Studer 9.06 to 7.10 in the bronze medal match.

== Competition format ==
The competition consisted of six rounds. Each surfer's two highest-scoring waves counted towards their heat total, with each wave scored from 0.1 to 10 on the basis of the difficulty, innovation and progression, variety, combination, speed, power and flow of the manoeuvres performed.

- Round 1: 8 heats of three surfers each (three heats contained only two surfers). The winner of each heat (8 surfers) advanced directly to Round 3, while the remaining surfers (13) moved to Round 2, the first elimination round.
- Round 2: 8 heats of two surfers each, three of which were byes. The winner of each heat advanced to Round 3, while the loser was eliminated.
- Round 3 (round of 16): 8 heats of two surfers each; the winner advanced to the quarter-finals.
- Quarter-finals: 4 heats of two surfers each; the winner advanced to the semi-finals.
- Semi-finals: 2 heats of two surfers each; the winners advanced to the gold medal match and the losers to the bronze medal match.
- Finals: the gold medal match and the bronze medal match.

== Schedule ==
All times are Japan Standard Time (UTC+09:00).

Date	Time	Round
Friday, 25 September 2026	07:00	Round 1
Sunday, 27 September 2026	07:00	Round 2
Sunday, 27 September 2026	13:30	Round 3
Tuesday, 29 September 2026	08:52	Quarter-finals
Tuesday, 29 September 2026	11:50	Semi-finals
Tuesday, 29 September 2026	13:29	Finals

== Results ==
=== Round 1 ===
The first round was non-elimination. Surfers were drawn into eight heats of three surfers each, with the top surfer advancing straight to Round 3 and the bottom two surfers going to Round 2.

==== Heat 1 ====
Rank	Athlete	Waves		Total score	Notes
Rank	Athlete	1	2	Total score	Notes
1	Juralyn Espanola (PHI)	6.17	4.77	10.94	R3
2	Nilbie Blancada (PHI)	5.00	4.40	9.40	R2
3	Mona Rasidah Abdul Rashid (MAS)	0.93	0.83	1.76	R2

==== Heat 2 ====
Rank	Athlete	Waves		Total score	Notes
Rank	Athlete	1	2	Total score	Notes
1	Jin Shuhan (CHN)	4.00	3.73	7.73	R3
2	Kya Jo Heuer (INA)	2.73	2.30	5.03	R2
3	Fatema Akter (BAN)	2.50	0.42	2.92	R2; PEN1

==== Heat 3 ====
Rank	Athlete	Waves		Total score	Notes
Rank	Athlete	1	2	Total score	Notes
1	Isabel Higgs (THA)	5.67	3.50	9.17	R3
2	Chen Wan-yu (TPE)	2.93	2.60	5.53	R2
3	Sugar Shanti Gayen (IND)	2.67	1.17	3.84	R2

==== Heat 4 ====
Rank	Athlete	Waves		Total score	Notes
Rank	Athlete	1	2	Total score	Notes
1	Minami Nonaka (JPN)	7.50	5.17	12.67	R3
2	Aminath Thaanees Shiran (MDV)	0.93	0.50	1.43	R2

==== Heat 5 ====
Rank	Athlete	Waves		Total score	Notes
Rank	Athlete	1	2	Total score	Notes
1	Mirai Ikeda (JPN)	5.83	5.10	10.93	R3
2	Kamali Prakash (IND)	2.67	1.07	3.74	R2

==== Heat 6 ====
Rank	Athlete	Waves		Total score	Notes
Rank	Athlete	1	2	Total score	Notes
1	Yang Siqi (CHN)	4.93	4.83	9.76	R3
2	Im Su-jung (KOR)	3.00	2.00	5.00	R2
3	Mariyam Rahil Naseem (MDV)	0.70	0.63	1.33	R2

==== Heat 7 ====
Rank	Athlete	Waves		Total score	Notes
Rank	Athlete	1	2	Total score	Notes
1	Jasmine Michelle Studer (INA)	4.80	4.00	8.80	R3
2	Lee Na-la (KOR)	4.50	2.60	7.10	R2

==== Heat 8 ====
Rank	Athlete	Waves		Total score	Notes
Rank	Athlete	1	2	Total score	Notes
1	Annissa Flynn (THA)	5.00	3.80	8.80	R3
2	Chung Yun-jung (TPE)	3.33	3.23	6.56	R2
3	Camille Marie Spaccarotella (SGP)	1.73	1.53	3.26	R2

=== Round 2 ===
In the second round surfers were drawn into eight heats of two surfers each, with the winner advancing to Round 3 (round of 16) and the loser being eliminated. Because only 13 surfers progressed from Round 1, heats 1, 4 and 5 were byes, with Nilbie Blancada, Chung Yun-jung and Kya Jo Heuer advancing automatically.

==== Heat 1 ====
Rank	Athlete	Waves		Total score	Notes
Rank	Athlete	1	2	Total score	Notes
—	Nilbie Blancada (PHI)	—	—	—	Bye

==== Heat 2 ====
Rank	Athlete	Waves		Total score	Notes
Rank	Athlete	1	2	Total score	Notes
1	Lee Na-la (KOR)	4.50	3.70	8.20	R3
2	Mariyam Rahil Naseem (MDV)	0.70	0.50	1.20	E

==== Heat 3 ====
Rank	Athlete	Waves		Total score	Notes
Rank	Athlete	1	2	Total score	Notes
1	Kamali Prakash (IND)	4.17	3.40	7.57	R3
2	Camille Marie Spaccarotella (SGP)	2.50	2.00	4.50	E

==== Heat 4 ====
Rank	Athlete	Waves		Total score	Notes
Rank	Athlete	1	2	Total score	Notes
—	Chung Yun-jung (TPE)	—	—	—	Bye

==== Heat 5 ====
Rank	Athlete	Waves		Total score	Notes
Rank	Athlete	1	2	Total score	Notes
—	Kya Jo Heuer (INA)	—	—	—	Bye

==== Heat 6 ====
Rank	Athlete	Waves		Total score	Notes
Rank	Athlete	1	2	Total score	Notes
1	Mona Rasidah Abdul Rashid (MAS)	1.43	1.17	2.60	R3
2	Aminath Thaanees Shiran (MDV)	0.80	0.50	1.30	E

==== Heat 7 ====
Rank	Athlete	Waves		Total score	Notes
Rank	Athlete	1	2	Total score	Notes
1	Sugar Shanti Gayen (IND)	3.83	3.50	7.33	R3
2	Chen Wan-yu (TPE)	3.00	2.40	5.40	E

==== Heat 8 ====
Rank	Athlete	Waves		Total score	Notes
Rank	Athlete	1	2	Total score	Notes
1	Im Su-jung (KOR)	4.83	3.90	8.73	R3
2	Fatema Akter (BAN)	2.67	1.17	3.84	E

=== Bracket ===
The bracket from the round of 16 onwards was determined by the results of rounds 1 and 2. The winner of each head-to-head heat qualified for the next round.

Round 3; 27 September
Jasmine Michelle Studer (INA)	11.64
Kamali Prakash (IND)	5.93
Juralyn Espanola (PHI)	10.20
Nilbie Blancada (PHI)	10.00
Annissa Flynn (THA)	9.83
Chung Yun-jung (TPE)	7.43
Mirai Ikeda (JPN)	18.53
Mona Rasidah Abdul Rashid (MAS)	2.37
Minami Nonaka (JPN)	14.60
Sugar Shanti Gayen (IND)	5.17
Kya Jo Heuer (INA)	12.53
Jin Shuhan (CHN)	9.80
Yang Siqi (CHN)	11.00
Im Su-jung (KOR)	8.63
Isabel Higgs (THA)	12.10
Lee Na-la (KOR)	7.97

Quarter-finals; 29 September
Jasmine Michelle Studer (INA)	10.67
Juralyn Espanola (PHI)	6.64
Annissa Flynn (THA)	5.43
Mirai Ikeda (JPN)	10.67
Minami Nonaka (JPN)	8.10
Kya Jo Heuer (INA)	6.97
Yang Siqi (CHN)	15.80
Isabel Higgs (THA)	10.84

Semi-finals; 29 September
Jasmine Michelle Studer (INA)	8.17
Mirai Ikeda (JPN)	10.83
Minami Nonaka (JPN)	8.84
Yang Siqi (CHN)	13.83

Gold medal match 29 September
(gold) Mirai Ikeda (JPN)	11.64
(silver) Yang Siqi (CHN)	7.57
Bronze medal match 29 September
(bronze) Minami Nonaka (JPN)	9.06
Jasmine Michelle Studer (INA)	7.10

=== Round 3 ===
In the third round (round of 16) surfers were drawn into eight heats of two surfers each, with the winner advancing to the quarter-finals and the loser being eliminated.

==== Heat 1 ====
Rank	Athlete	Waves		Total score	Notes
Rank	Athlete	1	2	Total score	Notes
1	Jasmine Michelle Studer (INA)	6.67	4.97	11.64	QF
2	Kamali Prakash (IND)	3.00	2.93	5.93	E

==== Heat 2 ====
Rank	Athlete	Waves		Total score	Notes
Rank	Athlete	1	2	Total score	Notes
1	Juralyn Espanola (PHI)	5.13	5.07	10.20	QF
2	Nilbie Blancada (PHI)	5.27	4.73	10.00	E

==== Heat 3 ====
Rank	Athlete	Waves		Total score	Notes
Rank	Athlete	1	2	Total score	Notes
1	Annissa Flynn (THA)	5.33	4.50	9.83	QF
2	Chung Yun-jung (TPE)	4.93	2.50	7.43	E

==== Heat 4 ====
Rank	Athlete	Waves		Total score	Notes
Rank	Athlete	1	2	Total score	Notes
1	Mirai Ikeda (JPN)	9.53	9.00	18.53	QF
2	Mona Rasidah Abdul Rashid (MAS)	1.50	0.87	2.37	E

==== Heat 5 ====
Rank	Athlete	Waves		Total score	Notes
Rank	Athlete	1	2	Total score	Notes
1	Minami Nonaka (JPN)	7.60	7.00	14.60	QF
2	Sugar Shanti Gayen (IND)	2.67	2.50	5.17	E

==== Heat 6 ====
Rank	Athlete	Waves		Total score	Notes
Rank	Athlete	1	2	Total score	Notes
1	Kya Jo Heuer (INA)	6.83	5.70	12.53	QF
2	Jin Shuhan (CHN)	4.93	4.87	9.80	E

==== Heat 7 ====
Rank	Athlete	Waves		Total score	Notes
Rank	Athlete	1	2	Total score	Notes
1	Yang Siqi (CHN)	5.83	5.17	11.00	QF
2	Im Su-jung (KOR)	4.50	4.13	8.63	E

==== Heat 8 ====
Rank	Athlete	Waves		Total score	Notes
Rank	Athlete	1	2	Total score	Notes
1	Isabel Higgs (THA)	6.27	5.83	12.10	QF
2	Lee Na-la (KOR)	4.50	3.47	7.97	E

=== Quarter-finals ===
The women's quarter-finals took place on 29 September 2026.

==== Heat 1 ====
Rank	Athlete	Waves		Total score	Notes
Rank	Athlete	1	2	Total score	Notes
1	Jasmine Michelle Studer (INA)	6.50	4.17	10.67	SF
2	Juralyn Espanola (PHI)	3.47	3.17	6.64	E

==== Heat 2 ====
Rank	Athlete	Waves		Total score	Notes
Rank	Athlete	1	2	Total score	Notes
1	Mirai Ikeda (JPN)	6.17	4.50	10.67	SF
2	Annissa Flynn (THA)	4.33	1.10	5.43	E

==== Heat 3 ====
Rank	Athlete	Waves		Total score	Notes
Rank	Athlete	1	2	Total score	Notes
1	Minami Nonaka (JPN)	4.33	3.77	8.10	SF
2	Kya Jo Heuer (INA)	3.67	3.30	6.97	E

==== Heat 4 ====
Rank	Athlete	Waves		Total score	Notes
Rank	Athlete	1	2	Total score	Notes
1	Yang Siqi (CHN)	8.17	7.63	15.80	SF
2	Isabel Higgs (THA)	5.67	5.17	10.84	E

=== Semi-finals ===
==== Heat 1 ====
Rank	Athlete	Waves		Total score	Notes
Rank	Athlete	1	2	Total score	Notes
1	Mirai Ikeda (JPN)	6.33	4.50	10.83	F
2	Jasmine Michelle Studer (INA)	4.17	4.00	8.17	3/4

==== Heat 2 ====
Rank	Athlete	Waves		Total score	Notes
Rank	Athlete	1	2	Total score	Notes
1	Yang Siqi (CHN)	7.83	6.00	13.83	F
2	Minami Nonaka (JPN)	4.97	3.87	8.84	3/4

=== Bronze medal match ===
Rank	Athlete	Waves		Total score	Notes
Rank	Athlete	1	2	Total score	Notes
1	Minami Nonaka (JPN)	5.33	3.73	9.06	3rd place, bronze medalist(s)
2	Jasmine Michelle Studer (INA)	3.77	3.33	7.10	4th

=== Gold medal match ===
Rank	Athlete	Waves		Total score	Notes
Rank	Athlete	1	2	Total score	Notes
1	Mirai Ikeda (JPN)	5.97	5.67	11.64	1st place, gold medalist(s)
2	Yang Siqi (CHN)	4.00	3.57	7.57	2nd place, silver medalist(s)
