= 2026 Asian Games =

Multi-sport event in Aichi and Nagoya, Japan

20th Asian Games
- Host city: Aichi Prefecture and Nagoya, Japan
- Motto: Imagine One Asia (Japanese: ここで、ひとつに, Hepburn: Koko de, hitotsu ni)
- Nations: 46 (including the ART team)
- Athletes: 10,787
- Events: 469 in 43 sports (71 disciplines)
- Opening: 19 September 2026
- Closing: 4 October 2026
- Opened by: Naruhito; Emperor of Japan
- Closed by: Joaan bin Hamad Al Thani; President of the Olympic Council of Asia
- Athlete's Oath: Ryoichi Akamatsu; Yuki Tanaka
- Judge's Oath: Chiaki Tadanori; Rie Tanaka
- Torch lighter: Koji Murofushi; Shigenobu Murofushi
- Main venue: Paloma Mizuho Stadium
- Website: aichi-nagoya2026.org

Summer

Winter

The 2026 Asian Games (2026年アジア競技大会, 2026-nen Ajia Kyōgi Taikai), officially the XX Asian Games (第二十回アジア競技大会) and also known as Aichi–Nagoya 2026 (愛知・名古屋2026), was a multi-sport event held in Aichi Prefecture in Japan from 19 September to 4 October 2026 though several competitions started from 10 September. Nagoya, the capital city of Aichi Prefecture, is the third Japanese city to host the Asian Games, after Tokyo in 1958 and Hiroshima in 1994. Though Aichi Prefecture was the primary host, the competitions took place in three other prefectures and Tokyo Metropolis as well. The event returned to its traditional four-year cycle, after the postponement of 2022 edition to 2023 due to the COVID-19 pandemic. The Games marked the 75th anniversary of the 1951 Asian Games held in New Delhi, India.

China topped the medal tally for the twelfth consecutive time. Some 54 world, 89 Asian and 212 Asian Games records were broken during the Games. Thai sprinter Puripol Boonson and Chinese swimmer Yu Zidi were announced as the most valuable players.

== Bidding process ==
The Olympic Council of Asia (OCA) welcomed the joint proposal from Aichi Prefecture and its capital Nagoya to host the Games at their annual general assembly session in Da Nang, Vietnam, on 25 September 2016. The joint bid proposal almost did not happen due to financial differences between the two interested parties; these were resolved in 2015 and 2016, allowing the joint bid to be accepted. The OCA originally planned to choose the 2026 host city in 2018, but brought the planning date forward due to the intensity of the region's sporting calendar, including two consecutive Winter Olympic Games and FIFA World Cups between 2018 and 2022 (held in Pyeongchang and Beijing, as well in Russia and Qatar) as well as the Summer Olympic Games (held in Tokyo in 2020).

2026 Asian Games bidding results
City	NOC	Result
Aichi and Nagoya	Japan	Unanimous

== Development and preparations ==
=== Costs ===
The city of Nagoya received an estimate of roughly ¥85 billion ($560 million) in costs from the Aichi Prefecture government for the Games, 30% of which is expected to be covered by sponsorships and other revenue, while the remainder is planned to be split on a 70–30 basis between Nagoya and Aichi Prefecture. In February 2023, the cost was reported to have ballooned to ¥140.5 billion ($927 million). In September 2026, the cost had risen to ¥370 billion ($2.4 billion). Aichi Prefecture governor Hideaki Ōmura named the weakening value of the yen... since 2021, geopolitical instability and rising prices for resources as contributors to the heightened budget. He highlighted that relying on a cruise ship and temporary accommodation for the athletes’ village and prioritising existing venues helped save ¥100 billion.

=== Athletes' Village ===
The Aichi–Nagoya Organising Committee originally intended to construct an athletes' village on the former site of the Nagoya Racecourse in Minato-ku, Nagoya, but decided not to due to high construction material costs and to avoid the development becoming a white elephant post-Games. Instead, they chose to have several athletes' villages spread across the prefecture. Around 4,000 to 5,000 athletes were hosted in the Costa Serena cruise ship docked at the Kinjo Pier. Some 2,000 athletes were hosted in temporary wooden villas styled after shipping containers at the Port of Nagoya Garden Wharf, which would be reused as disaster response units and tourist lodging after the Games. The rest of the athletes were housed in several hotels across the prefecture and outlying cities. For example, athletes that were competing in swimming and diving resided at the Tokyo Bay Shiomi Prince Hotel.

Because the Games are taking place towards the end of the Pacific typhoon season, organisers have put in place several contingency plans if athletes were to be evacuated from the cruise ship due to tsunamis, typhoons or other natural disasters. Record-breaking torrential rain hit Nagoya on 8 September 2026, 2 days before the start of competitions, causing widespread flash flooding. Several hundred athletes housed in temporary structures in the port area of the city were told to evacuate by officials. While leaking roofs were observed at some venues, no major damage was reported. Nagoya city mayor Ichirō Hirosawa ruled out any major disruption to the Games as a result of the floods, however a special event featuring SKE48 was cancelled due to the inclement weather.

=== Venues ===
In addition to Nagoya, several events spread across cities across Aichi Prefecture, and some venues in the Greater Tokyo Area that also hosted events during the 2020 Summer Olympics, as well as Gifu, Osaka, and Shizuoka prefectures, making the first-ever decentralized venues in history. Cycling events are scheduled to be held at the Izu Velodrome in Izu, Shizuoka. Some aquatic events were originally scheduled to be held at the Rainbow Pool, but with less than three years to go, OCA pointed out that the facilities did not meet World Aquatics' regulations. After discussions, it was decided to move the swimming events to the Tokyo Aquatics Centre, and the equestrian events to the Tokyo Equestrian Park; water polo was also moved to the Nippon Gaishi Hall's Rainbow Pool.

Hisaya Ōdori Park and Oasis 21 host a fan zone, celebration and cultural exchange hub during both Asian and Asian Para Games, known as One Asia World. It was inspired by the Champions Park at Jardins du Trocadéro that was held during the 2024 Summer Olympics in Paris, France.

==== Nagoya ====
Venues		Events	Capacity	Status
Paloma Mizuho Sports Park	Stadium	Ceremonies	35,000	Existing, replacement
Paloma Mizuho Sports Park	Stadium	Athletics (track and field, marathon start/finish)	35,000	Existing, replacement
Paloma Mizuho Sports Park	Rugby Stadium	Rugby sevens	10,400	Existing, renovated
Paloma Mizuho Sports Park	Rugby Stadium	Football (men's preliminaries)	10,400	Existing, renovated
Paloma Mizuho Sports Park	Arena	Sepak takraw	1,158	Existing
Aichi Budokan		Combat sports (ju-jitsu, kurash)	1,504	Existing
Aichi Budokan		Wushu	1,504	Existing
Aichi International Arena		Basketball	15,000	New
Aichi International Arena		Judo	15,000	New
Aichi Prefectural Government Office and Nagoya City Hall Loop Course		Athletics (race walk)	—N/a	Temporary
CS Asset Minato Soccer Stadium		Football (men's and women's preliminaries)	6,700	Existing, renovated
Higashi Sports Center		Padel	981	Existing
Higashi Sports Center		Teqball	981	Existing
Higashiyama Park Tennis Center		Tennis	4,000 (centre court)	Existing, renovated
Higashiyama Park Tennis Center		Soft tennis	4,000 (centre court)	Existing, renovated
Inae Sports Center		Combat sports (mixed martial arts)	2,232	Existing
Inae Sports Center		Wrestling	2,232	Existing
Kinjō-futō Station Square		3x3 basketball	1,000	Temporary
Nagoya City Trade and Industry Center		Weightlifting	TBA	Existing with temporary stands
Nagoya International Exhibition Hall	Hall 1	Sport climbing	TBA	Existing with temporary stands
Nagoya Velodrome BMX Race Course		Cycling (BMX racing)	156	Existing
Nippon Gaishi Hall	Rainbow Hall	Gymnastics	10,000	Existing, renovated
Nippon Gaishi Hall	Rainbow Pool	Aquatics (water polo)	3,500	Existing, renovated
Obata Ryokuchi Urban Forest		Cycling (mountain bike)	—N/a	Existing
Takeda Teva Ocean Arena		Squash	2,569	Existing, renovated

==== Aichi Prefecture ====
Venues		Cities	Events	Capacity	Status
Anjō Sports Park	Softball Ground	Anjō	Softball	2,500	Existing, renovated
Anjō Sports Park	Multipurpose Ground	Anjō	Modern pentathlon	1,700	Existing
Kaiyoh Yacht Harbor		Gamagōri	Sailing	TBA	Existing
Gamagōri City Triathlon Venue		Gamagōri	Triathlon	—N/a	Temporary
Hekinan Ryokuchi Beach Court		Hekinan	Beach volleyball	TBA	Existing with temporary stands
Ichinomiya City Municipal Gymnasium		Ichinomiya	Badminton	2,002	Existing
Toyoda Gosei Memorial Gymnasium		Inazawa	Handball (preliminaries and finals)	3,500	Existing
Wave Stadium Kariya		Kariya	Football (men's and women's preliminaries)	2,602	Existing
Kasugai Country Club		Kasugai	Golf	TBA	Existing
Kasugai City General Gymnasium		Kasugai	Handball (preliminaries)	5,000	Existing
Park Arena Komaki		Komaki	Volleyball (men's and women's preliminaries, women's final)	3,000	Existing
Miyoshi Lake		Miyoshi	Canoeing (sprint)	TBA	Existing with temporary stands
Nishio City Gymnasium		Nishio	Boxing	2,174	Existing
Kōrogi Athletic Park		Nisshin	Cricket	2,000	Existing with temporary stands
Okazaki Central Park	General Gymnasium	Okazaki	Volleyball (men's and women's preliminaries, men's final)	2,620	Existing
Okazaki Central Park	Multipurpose Square	Okazaki	Archery	TBA	Temporary
Okazaki Central Park	Baseball Stadium	Okazaki	Baseball (preliminaries)	20,000	Existing, renovated
Shinshiro Cycling Road Course		Shinshiro	Cycling (road)	—N/a	Temporary
Akabane Long Beach		Tahara	Surfing	TBA	Temporary
Tōkai Citizens Gymnasium		Tōkai	Kabaddi	1,300	Existing
Aichi International Exhibition Center	Hall B	Tokoname	Skateboarding	TBA	Existing with temporary stands
Aichi International Exhibition Center	Hall C	Tokoname	Cycling (BMX freestyle)	TBA	Existing with temporary stands
Aichi International Exhibition Center	Hall D	Tokoname	Esports	TBA	Existing with temporary stands
Aichi International Exhibition Center	Hall F	Tokoname	Fencing	TBA	Existing with temporary stands
Aichi International Exhibition Center	Hall F	Tokoname	Breaking	TBA	Existing with temporary stands
Toyohashi City General Gymnasium		Toyohashi	Karate	3,000	Existing
Toyohashi City General Gymnasium		Toyohashi	Taekwondo	3,000	Existing
Toyohashi Municipal Baseball Stadium		Toyohashi	Baseball (preliminaries and finals)	15,895	Existing, renovated
Aichi Prefectural Shooting Range		Toyota	Shooting	TBA	Existing, renovated
Sky Hall Toyota		Toyota	Table tennis	6,500	Existing
Toyota Stadium		Toyota	Football (men's preliminaries and finals)	45,000	Existing
Yahagigawa Canoe Slalom Course		Toyota	Canoeing (slalom)	TBA	Existing with temporary stands

==== Outlying venues ====
Venues	Cities/Wards	Prefectures	Events	Capacity	Status
Gifu Nagaragawa Stadium	Gifu	Gifu Prefecture	Football (women's preliminaries)	26,109	Existing
Nagaragawa International Regatta Course	Kaizu	Gifu Prefecture	Rowing	TBA	Existing with temporary stands
Gifu Prefectural Green Stadium	Kakamigahara	Gifu Prefecture	Field hockey	1,630	Existing
Nagai Stadium	Osaka	Osaka Prefecture	Football (men's and women's preliminaries)	47,853	Existing
Shizuoka Stadium	Fukuroi	Shizuoka Prefecture	Football (women's preliminaries and finals)	50,889	Existing
Furuhashi Hironoshin Memorial Hamamatsu Swimming Center	Hamamatsu	Shizuoka Prefecture	Aquatics (artistic swimming)	2,200	Existing
Izu Velodrome	Izu	Shizuoka Prefecture	Cycling (track)	3,600	Existing
Tokyo Aquatics Centre	Kōtō	Tokyo	Aquatics (diving, swimming)	10,000	Existing
Tokyo Equestrian Park	Setagaya	Tokyo	Equestrian	1,500	Existing

=== Torch relay ===
The torch relay began on 18 August with a flame-lighting event in front of the 1958 Asian Games and 1964 Summer Olympics legacy cauldron near the Japan National Stadium in Tokyo. Another flame-lighting event was held on 20 August at the Hiroshima Peace Memorial Park in Hiroshima, host of the 1994 Games. The main relay ran from 22 August to 18 September, concluding the day before the opening ceremony. Both flames were united through the use of a concave mirror, and the relay started at Nagoya Castle, passing across 40 municipalities of Aichi Prefecture and all 16 wards of Nagoya. 1,000 torchbearers took part. The torch design, as well as the relay routes were unveiled on 11 June, 100 days until the opening ceremony. There was also a torch relay for school children held from 7 to 15 September involving 14 schools.

== Ceremonies ==
=== Opening ceremony ===
The opening ceremony was held on 19 September 2026 at 18:00 to 20:00 JST (UTC+09:00) at Paloma Mizuho Stadium. Its theme was "Harmonic Heart Beat", and Japanese filmmaker Yukihiko Tsutsumi was appointed as the creative director of the ceremonies. It was attended and opened by Emperor Naruhito.

=== Closing ceremony ===
The closing ceremony was held on 4 October 2026 at 18:00 to 19:30 JST (UTC+09:00) at Paloma Mizuho Stadium. It included a cultural presentation, closing remarks, and the formal handover to Doha, Qatar, as hosts of next edition in 2030, the first since 2006.

== The Games ==
=== Sports ===
The 2026 Asian Games includes 469 medal events in 43 sports, a decrease of 12 events over Hangzhou 2022; Freestyle BMX, mixed martial arts, padel, surfing, teqball and virtual taekwondo made their Asian Games debut.

In April 2025, the organising committee approved the inclusion of cricket and mixed martial arts to the programme, following a request from OCA. In addition, open water swimming was removed from the programme. In December 2025, OCA approved the inclusion of padel and teqball to the programme, with all costs covered by the respective international federations of the sport. Later in June 2026, the OCA approved the inclusion of virtual taekwondo to the programme, making it the first-ever virtual sport event.

2026 Asian Games sports programme
- Aquatics
  - Artistic swimming (2)
  - Diving (10)
  - Swimming (41)
  - Water polo (2)
- Archery (10)
- Athletics (50)
- Badminton (7)
- Baseball
  - Baseball (1)
  - Softball (1)
- Basketball
  - Basketball (2)
  - 3x3 basketball (2)
- Boxing (11)
- Breaking (2)
- Canoeing
  - Slalom (6)
  - Sprint (12)
- Combat sports
  - Ju-jitsu (8)
  - Kurash (6)
  - Mixed martial arts (6)
- Cricket (2)
- Cycling
  - BMX racing (2)
  - Freestyle BMX (2)
  - Mountain bike (2)
  - Road (4)
  - Track (12)
- Equestrian (details)
  - Dressage (2)
  - Eventing (2)
  - Jumping (3)
- Esports (11)
- Fencing (12)
- Field hockey (2)
- Football (2)
- Golf (4)
- Gymnastics
  - Artistic (14)
  - Rhythmic (2)
  - Trampoline (2)
- Handball (2)
- Judo (15)
- Kabaddi (2)
- Karate (15)
- Modern pentathlon (4)
- Padel (2)
- Rowing (14)
- Rugby sevens (2)
- Sailing (14)
- Sepak takraw (6)
- Shooting (28)
- Skateboarding (4)
- Sport climbing (6)
- Squash (5)
- Surfing (2)
- Table tennis (7)
- Taekwondo
  - Taekwondo (10)
  - Virtual taekwondo (1)
- Tennis
  - Soft tennis (5)
  - Tennis (5)
- Teqball (5)
- Triathlon (3)
- Volleyball
  - Beach volleyball (2)
  - Volleyball (2)
- Weightlifting (16)
- Wrestling (18)
- Wushu (15)

- Five regional sports that were nominated by each region of the Olympic Council of Asia:
1. Wushu (East Asia)
2. Sepak takraw (Southeast Asia)
3. Kabaddi (South Asia)
4. Kurash (Central Asia)
5. Jujitsu (West Asia)
- Three sports that were part of the 2024 Summer Olympics and are not part of the core Asian Games programme:
1. Breaking
2. Skateboarding
3. Surfing
- Three sports and disciplines proposed by the organising committee:
1. Baseball
2. Softball
3. Karate
- Seven sports and disciplines proposed by the Olympic Council of Asia:
1. Cricket
2. Esports
3. Mixed martial arts
4. Padel
5. Squash
6. Teqball
7. Virtual taekwondo

== Participating nations ==
All 45 National Olympic Committees who were members of the Olympic Council of Asia sent delegations. A refugee team partook for the first time in the Asian Games.

Participating National Olympic Committees
- Afghanistan (50)
- Asian Refugee Team (2)
- Bahrain (128)
- Bangladesh (188)
- Bhutan (13)
- Brunei (6)
- Cambodia (60)
- China (815)
- North Korea (107)
- Hong Kong (581)
- India (500)
- Indonesia (424)
- Iran (305)
- Iraq (14)
- Japan (932)
- Jordan (73)
- Kazakhstan (557)
- Kuwait (119)
- Kyrgyzstan (174)
- Laos (66)
- Lebanon (39)
- Macau (85)
- Malaysia (349)
- Maldives (42)
- Mongolia (299)
- Myanmar (59)
- Nepal (136)
- Oman (71)
- Pakistan (165)
- Palestine (70)
- Philippines (452)
- Qatar (254)
- Saudi Arabia (138)
- Singapore (302)
- South Korea (792)
- Sri Lanka (156)
- Syria (40)
- Chinese Taipei (480)
- Tajikistan (103)
- Thailand (690)
- Timor-Leste (13)
- Turkmenistan (35)
- United Arab Emirates (153)
- Uzbekistan (397)
- Vietnam (348)
- Yemen (17)

== Calendar ==
OC	Opening ceremony	●	Event competitions	●	Event finals	CC	Closing ceremony

September/October 2026		September																					October				Events
September/October 2026		10 Thu	11 Fri	12 Sat	13 Sun	14 Mon	15 Tue	16 Wed	17 Thu	18 Fri	19 Sat	20 Sun	21 Mon	22 Tue	23 Wed	24 Thu	25 Fri	26 Sat	27 Sun	28 Mon	29 Tue	30 Wed	1 Thu	2 Fri	3 Sat	4 Sun	Events
Ceremonies											OC															CC	—N/a
Aquatics
Aquatics	Artistic swimming																	●	1	1							2
Aquatics	Diving																	2	2	2	2	2					10
Aquatics	Swimming											7	7	6	7	7	7										41
Aquatics	Water polo											●	●	●	●	1		●	●	●	●	●		●	1		2
Archery																		●	●	●	●	3	2	3	2		10
Athletics															2	4	7	7	11	10	9						50
Badminton												●	●	●	●	2	●	●	●	●	5						7
Baseball
Baseball	Baseball												●	●	●		●	●	1								1
Baseball	Softball																	●	●	●	●	●	●	●	1		1
Basketball
Basketball	Basketball	●	●	●	●	●		●	●	●	●	1	●	●		●	●	1									2
Basketball	3x3 basketball												●	●	●	●	2										2
Boxing													●	●	●	●	●	●	●	●	●	●		11			11
Breaking																								●	2		2
Canoeing
Canoeing	Slalom																				●	2	2	2			6
Canoeing	Sprint														●	4	4	4									12
Combat sports
Combat sports	Ju-jitsu																						3	3	2		8
Combat sports	Kurash																		2	2	2						6
Combat sports	Mixed martial arts											●	●	6													6
Cricket									●	●		●		1		●	●	●		●	●		●		1		2
Cycling
Cycling	BMX																		2	2							4
Cycling	Mountain biking															1	1										2
Cycling	Road cycling											2		1	1												4
Cycling	Track cycling																				2	3	3	4			12
Equestrian														●	2		1	●	1				1		●	2	7
Esports														●	2	1	●	2	1	1	1	1	1	1			11
Fencing														2	2	2	2	2	2								12
Field hockey										●		●	●	●	●	●	●	●	●	●		●	●	1	1		2
Football						●	●	●	●	●		●	●	●	●		●	●			●	●		1	1		2
Golf																						●	●	●	4		4
Gymnastics
Gymnastics	Artistic												1	1	2	5	5										14
Gymnastics	Rhythmic																						●	●	2		2
Gymnastics	Trampolining																		2								2
Handball											●	●	●	●	●		●	●	1	●	1						2
Judo																						4	5	5	1		15
Kabaddi													●	●	●	●	●	2									2
Karate												4	4	4	3												15
Modern pentathlon								●	●	●		4															4
Padel																				●	●	●	●	●	2		2
Rowing															●	14											14
Rugby sevens																							●	●	2		2
Sailing																		●	●	●	●	●	2	7	5		14
Sepak takraw												●	●	●	●	●	2		●	●	2	●	●	●	2		6
Shooting												2	2	1	6	3	3	2	●	2	4	1	2				28
Skateboarding																●	2	●	2								4
Sport climbing																					●	2	2	●	2		6
Squash															●	●	●	●	3	●	●	●	●	2			5
Surfing																	●	●	●	2							2
Table tennis												●	●	●	●	2	●	1	2	2							7
Taekwondo
Taekwondo	Taekwondo																						2	4	4		10
Taekwondo	Virtual taekwondo																							1			1
Tennis
Tennis	Tennis																		●	●	●	●	●	2	3		5
Tennis	Soft tennis									●		2	1	●	2												5
Teqball									●	●	●	5															5
Triathlon												2	1														3
Volleyball
Volleyball	Beach volleyball											●	●	●	●	●	●	●	●	●	●	●	●	1	1		2
Volleyball	Indoor volleyball							●	●	●		●	●	1					●	●	●		●	●	1		2
Weightlifting															2	2	2	2	2	2	4						16
Wrestling																						4	4	5	5		18
Wushu												2	2	2	2	7											15
Daily medal events		0	0	0	0	0	0	0	0	0	0	31	18	25	33	56	39	25	33	26	32	22	29	51	47	2	469
Cumulative total		0	0	0	0	0	0	0	0	0	0	31	49	74	107	163	202	227	260	286	318	340	369	420	467	469	469
September/October 2026		September																					October				Events
September/October 2026		10 Thu	11 Fri	12 Sat	13 Sun	14 Mon	15 Tue	16 Wed	17 Thu	18 Fri	19 Sat	20 Sun	21 Mon	22 Tue	23 Wed	24 Thu	25 Fri	26 Sat	27 Sun	28 Mon	29 Tue	30 Wed	1 Thu	2 Fri	3 Sat	4 Sun	Events

Source: Aichi-Nagoya 2026

== Medal table ==
The top 10 ranked NOCs at these Games are listed below.

* Host nation (Japan)

2026 Asian Games medal table
Rank	Nation	Gold	Silver	Bronze	Total
1	China	169	89	83	341
2	Japan*	83	95	91	269
3	South Korea	39	43	68	150
4	India	21	27	37	85
5	Uzbekistan	21	25	24	70
6	Iran	19	18	15	52
7	Thailand	18	13	21	52
8	Kazakhstan	12	24	48	84
9	Hong Kong	11	19	24	54
10	Bahrain	11	5	6	22
11–40	Remaining NOCs	66	111	212	389
Totals (40 entries)		470	469	629	1,568

== Marketing ==
=== Emblem ===
The emblem of the Games was unveiled during a ceremony on 1 April 2020. Each colour has its own meaning, with purple representing the iris laevigata, gold for shachihoko, the golden tiger-fish roof ornaments which are the symbol of Nagoya Castle, and green representing environmental consciousness.

=== Mascot ===
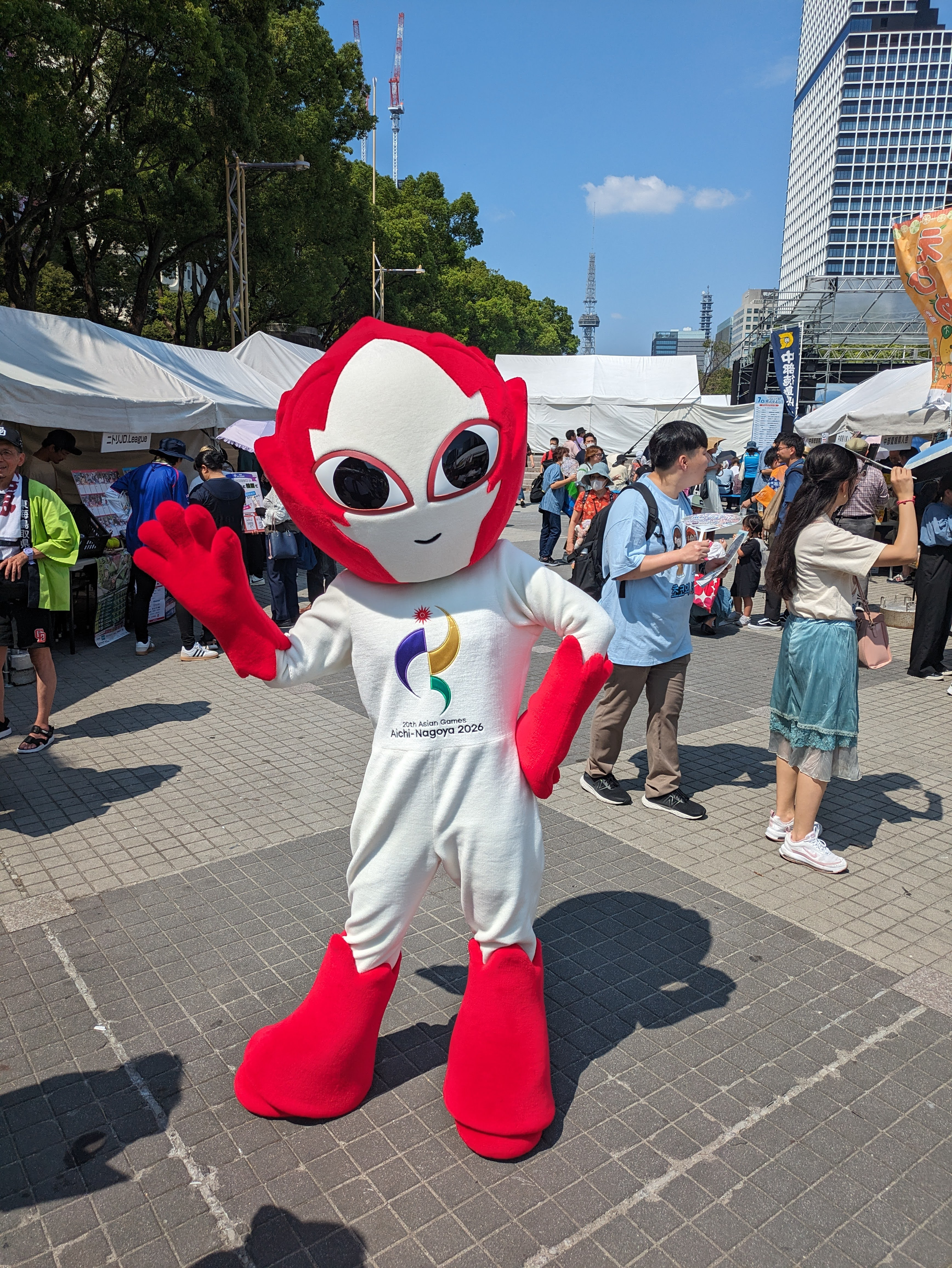
Mascot of the 20th Asian Games, Honohon, at an event in Nagoya in September 2024

The mascot of the Games, Honohon (Japanese: ホノホン) was unveiled on 14 July 2024. Its design is based on the shachihoko.

=== Motto ===
The official motto of the 2026 Asian Games, "Imagine One Asia" was announced on 1 April 2020 to mark six years before the opening ceremony.

=== Corporate sponsorship ===
Sponsors of the 2026 Asian Games
Prestige Partners
- 361 Degrees
- Aeon
- Bornan Sports Technology
- Central Japan Railway Company
- Chubu Electric Power
- GL events
- Toyota
Official Partners
- Canon Inc.
- Dafeng Industry
- Denso
- JTB Corporation
- MUFG Bank
- Nippon Telegraph and Telephone
- Nitori
- Otsuka Pharmaceutical (Pocari Sweat)
- Shanghai Yude Energy
- Tobu Top Tours
Official Sponsors
- Aisin
- ALSOK
- Chubu Centrair International Airport
- Daido Steel
- Kowa
- Meitetsu
- PIA Corporation
- Rinnai
- Taishan Sports
- Toho Gas
- Toyota Industries
- Toyota Tsusho
Official Suppliers
- Bandai Namco Entertainment
- Brother Industries
- Capcom
- Chunichi Shimbun
- Congrès Inc.
- Convention Linkage
- Fuji Baking
- Global Hospitality Group
- Hibino
- Japan Airlines
- Japan Post Holdings
- JGC Parallel Technologies
- JTEKT
- Kioxia
- Konami
- Lenovo
- MCJ (Mouse Computer)
- NEC
- NGK Corporation
- Niterra
- Noritake
- Okaya & Co.
- Paloma
- Sega
- SNK
- Starting Future
- Tencent Esports
- The Yomiuri Shimbun
- Toyoda Gosei
- Toyota Auto Body
- Toyota Boshoku
- Transtech LED
- Weathernews Inc.
- Yonex

=== Music ===
The official theme song for the Games, "Beyond the Sky", performed by INI, was released on 5 August 2026; It was also created as a fight song for all athletes. The second official song for the games, "Love Beat", performed by Kana Nishino featuring Japanese girl group NiziU.

== Broadcasting ==
=== Host broadcasters ===
Rights holder	Ref
CMG-IMP	

=== Rights holding broadcasters ===
Country/region	Rights holder	Ref
Unsold markets	Asian Games TV	
Brunei	RTB; Astro	
China	CMG; CCTV	
Hong Kong	i-Cable Communications Limited	
India	Sony Sports Networks	
Indonesia	TVRI Sport; Emtek; RANS Entertainment	
Japan	JNN; CBC; MBS; TBS; Abema; U-Next	
Macau	TDM	
Malaysia	RTM; Astro	
Mongolia	NTV	
MENA	beIN Sports	
Nepal	Kantipur Max	
Pakistan	PTV Sports; Ten Sports; Tamasha; Tapmad	
Philippines	Cignal; One Sports	
Singapore	Mediacorp	
South Korea	Korean Consortium; KBS; MBC; SBS; TV Chosun; SPOTV; JTBC; Naver Sports; CHZZK	
Taiwan (Chinese Taipei)	ELTA TV (Note: Lead Broadcaster; for Chunghwa Telecom MOD and OTT (ELTA.tv and Hami Video)); CTS (Note: Terrestrial and Cable TV only); EBC; Videoland	
Thailand	SAT; NBT; T Sports 7; Monomax Sports TV; 9MCOT HD; One31; Thairath TV; PPTV HD 36; AIS Play	
Vietnam	VTV	

== Concerns and controversies ==
=== Organisational issues during preparation ===
In December 2024, reports emerged of tensions between the Olympic Council of Asia and the organising committee. The OCA was reportedly unimpressed with the pace at which the organising committee was preparing for the Games and demanded improvements in more than 10 areas, including transportation and accommodation. Insider sources also said that the Aichi-Nagoya organising committee was in danger of breaching the host city contract and the OCA was looking to terminate it unless substantial improvements were made.

On 11 April 2025, French event management firm GL events was awarded the contract to deliver the 2026 Asian Games and Asian Para Games. A Japanese firm was not given the contract owing to corruption and bid-rigging scandals by Dentsu at the 2020 Summer Olympic and Paralympic Games in Tokyo, as well as the Expo 2025 in Osaka. The appointment of GL events had attracted controversy from the beginning and the company almost immediately ran into problems, with several key documents and processes not being finalised until as late as October 2025, more than three months overdue.

At the time it was awarded, the contract was estimated to be worth around ¥63 billion ($414 million), however added debts and organisational delays caused the deficit to increase to just over ¥81 billion ($510 million) within the space of a few months. Professor Kyoko Kida of Chukyo University attributed the organisational failures before and during the Games to a lack of involvement by Japanese companies when contracts were initially awarded. She also pointed out that the Aichi-Nagoya organising committee was composed mostly of government and prefectural officials, the majority of whom had vanishingly little experience in organising major international events.

=== Exceeded athlete and official quota ===
The organising committee originally budgeted 15,000 athletes and officials to enter the Games. Due to an increased number of added events which were mandated by the Olympic Council of Asia, the number has been reportedly exceeded by upwards of 2,000, with the revised figure put at around 17,000—roughly 11,000 athletes and 6,000 officials. The governor of Aichi Prefecture, Hideaki Ōmura, stated that arrangements and budgets based on the host city's contract would not be able to accommodate more than 15,000, saying organisers had "neither the manpower nor the budget" to make arrangements for the additional participants. Organisers had asked the OCA to keep athlete and officials numbers below the original limit, and late additions were told to arrange their own accommodation.

On 19 August 2026, a month before the opening ceremony, the competition schedule was modified in line with reducing athlete numbers, which resulted in the cancellation and rescheduling of some events, leading to confusion from athletes and sports organisations, and already purchased tickets by spectators being voided.

On 28 August 2026, AINAGOC and the OCA jointly released a statement to clear up the "incorrect media reports", stating that the number of athletes and officials was changing on a daily basis, and the final number has not been determined. All athletes and officials that had registered by the July deadline would be provided with Games-appropriate accommodation. In addition, it was decided that some officials would be allowed to arrange their own accommodation through their respective NOC.

=== Athlete accommodation issues ===
Several athletes and officials have complained about the wooden villas where some are staying at the Port of Nagoya Garden Wharf. Vice president of the Korea Basketball Association, Jung Jae-yong, said that the compact nature of the villas doesn't allow taller athletes to "stretch their legs out on the beds". Byeon Jun-hyeong, who is a part of South Korea men's basketball team roster, had a leaking sink and soaked floor in his villa, shown through a video he posted on their social media. Jung also said that organisers have not responded to any concerns raised. Reports specified that the standard bed length in the container-style units was around 195 centimetres, which several delegations said was inadequate for taller athletes, alongside complaints of cramped shower spaces. Aichi Prefecture governor Ōmura stated the accommodation arrangements to be "functional", saying organisers were responding to individual complaints as they arose and would continue to improve conditions, while maintaining that the priority for those housed aboard the Costa Serena was athlete safety.

Organisers bypassed a traditional centralized Athletes' Village. Instead, they are utilizing local hotels, temporary container-style wooden cabins, and the Costa Serena cruise ship. A surge in registrations to over 17,000 participants (well over the budgeted 15,000) has left housing extremely tight, and the passengers sparked anger over the athletes participation. Director general of the OCA Husain Al-Musallam's statement at a press conference about the Athletes' Village issues, but doing so would have left them with a white elephant after the curtain comes down on the multi-sport event.

Some delegations also faced issues when registering upon arrival at their accommodations. In one such case, an athlete and two coaches from the Indian wushu team arrived at the cruise ship to discover that their names were not listed on the accommodation records, leading to a two hour delay. The Malaysian and Vietnamese delegations also complained of lengthy procedures when checking in to their accommodation. Accommodation manager Yuta Matsuo acknowledged the issues teams were facing and stated that the organising committee was "already taking concrete steps to improve the environment for the athletes, including their living conditions during their stay".

In a separate incident, Indian gymnast Pranati Nayak and her coach Ashok Mishra were mistakenly allotted the same cabin aboard the Costa Serena upon arrival, raising concerns over mixed-gender room allocation; the Indian Olympic Association intervened and separate accommodation was arranged at around 1:30 am, though a further clerical error—a missing letter in Mishra's name—meant his new booking could not initially be located in the ship's register.

=== Cricket facilities and Indian accommodation issues ===
At the end of August 2026, representatives of several members of the Asian Cricket Council raised concerns over the cricket venue; Kōrogi Sports Park in Nisshin. Most complained about the lack of proper dressing rooms and the pitch not being readied for competition.

Organisers moved to ease concerns over a potential accommodation crunch by confirming that lodging has been arranged for more than 17,000 athletes and officials registered for the event. The official statement also came days after it was reported that even the Board of Control for Cricket in India (BCCI) was upset with the facilities for the cricketers. An ANI report claimed that the Indian board was contemplating sending a 'B' team if the facilities are not improved.

=== Diplomatic and political issues ===
On 14 September 2026, a ceremony was held at Kintaicho Port to commemorate the docking of the Costa Serena cruise. One of the performances featured three performers dressed as historical figures symbolising Japan's Sengoku period: Oda Nobunaga, Toyotomi Hideyoshi, and Tokugawa Ieyasu referred to as the "Three Outstanding Men of Nagoya". This prompted criticism from the South Korean delegation, because of Hideyoshi involvement in Imjin War. The organising committee insisted that there was no intent to cause offence or push political messages, however South Korea's chef-de-mission warned that the delegation would "make clear its position regarding parts where political issues intervene in sports".

Prior to a men's field hockey match on 18 September 2026 between Bangladesh and South Korea, the national anthem of North Korea was mistakenly played instead of the South Korean anthem. The stadium announcer apologised a short time later upon realising the mistake. The organising committee later sent the South Korean team a written apology for the incident, describing it as a "major human error" and setting out the steps it would take to prevent recurrences, such as having multiple staff members check the system before anthems are played. A day later, at a Hong Kong–South Korea women's handball match, no anthem was played for either team, which left both teams confused.

On 18 September 2026, the Chinese Taipei delegation refused to take part in their flag-raising ceremony in protest after Taiwan's sports minister Lee Yang was barred from taking part. The OCA stated that the flag-raising ceremonies were intended for athletes and team officials only and government ministers were not permitted to attend. Lee was eventually granted permission to attend the ceremony, causing it to be delayed by an hour.

On 25 September 2026, during a baseball match between Chinese Taipei and China, political tensions over Taiwan's identification at Olympic-affiliated events resurfaced after a spectator was asked to put away a towel bearing the word "Taiwan," saying it violated the Asian Games' ban on political messages. The fan complained, but several spectators who witnessed the interaction began chanting "Team Taiwan" in protest, according to a video of the incident. A sign was placed outside the venue prohibiting the display of the Republic of China flag and the Rising Sun flag, however some spectators changed clothes after entering the stadium or smuggled flags in despite the ban.

On 3 October 2026, following the men's football final, the flag of South Korea failed to raise during the medal ceremony following their 1-0 victory over Japan. The team later caused widespread controversy in South Korea after their team captain Lee Gi-hyuk and several teammates celebrated the fact that their gold medals would grant them an exemption from compulsory military service. Lee later apologised for his remarks, as did the rest of the team. The incident prompted debate on whether gold medal winning athletes should be granted exemptions from national service.

=== Logistic problems ===
On 16 September 2026, there was widespread system disruption which prevented delegations from taking the chartered shuttle buses from Chubu Centrair International Airport to their accommodations. Almost all of the Chinese gymnastics team was stranded at the airport due to issues with the system, preventing the team from boarding their scheduled shuttle bus. Athletes from China, South Korea, Vietnam and Thailand were left to sleep on the floor of the nearby Aichi Sky Expo as a result of their records going missing from the system and issues with the shuttle buses.

Meanwhile, teams from India and South Korea complained of significant disruption to Games transportation. On 16 September 2026, South Korea's under-23 football team arrived to a recovery training session 20 minutes later than expected as there was no bus scheduled to take them there, leaving organisers scrambling to find a replacement. The previous day, the driver of the team's bus mistakenly took the team to the baseball venue, causing the team to arrive at their competition venue 30 minutes later than scheduled. India's shooting team raised concerns over lengthy commutes to and from Games venues and accommodation, with a journey from the athletes' village to the shooting venue in Toyota taking as long as 2 hours and up to 50 kilometres (30 miles) apart.

After a baseball game in a rural area, functionally the only available transport option back to the city for spectators was a shuttle bus service that only arrived every 15 minutes. Footage showed thousands of people waiting in line late at night. One interviewee claimed to have waited over an hour to board.

On 28 September, the official bus carried the Pakistan men's national volleyball team went to the wrong venue. This incident caused their group game with Uzbekistan to be delayed by 45 minutes.

=== Ticket sales and local reception ===
Local enthusiasm ahead of the Games was reported as muted, with data compiled by the organising committee as of 7 September showing that, of 41 ticketed sports, ten events—including football, baseball/softball, field hockey and cricket—had sold under 60 percent of available tickets. Governor Ōmura said sales were going "fairly well" overall, particularly for marquee events, but acknowledged that lesser-known sports had struggled to draw local interest. Journalists covering the opening ceremony noted the large number of empty seats at the stadium, despite organisers previously claiming that tickets for the event had sold out.

Director general of the OCA Husain Al-Musallam later cited typhoon warnings in Japan on the day of the ceremony and restrictions on where audience members could sit as factors for the low attendance. Secretary general of the organising committee Satoshi Murate insisted that over 90% of tickets for the ceremony had been sold, but blamed the empty seats on no-shows.

Empty seats remained an issue throughout the Games. The women's football semi-final between Japan and South Korea at Shizuoka Stadium was played to a crowd of just 998 spectators, despite the stadium having the capacity for around 50,000 people. A match earlier in the tournament between China and Hong Kong at Gifu Nagaragawa Stadium had an audience of just 179 people. Director general of the organising committee Takaaki Osami attributed low audience numbers in some events to spectators purchasing tickets for whole sessions, but only arriving and staying when Japanese athletes were scheduled to appear, causing discrepancies in the number of seats being filled. Director of ticketing Takashi Yamazaki admitted in a press conference on 30 September that the number of empty seats in venues was "disappointing" and blamed poor weather and a lack of enthusiasm from the public as reasons for the high numbers of vacant seats. He added that ticket sales usually surge in the latter period of an event, however that has not been the case on this occasion.

=== Doping ===
Thai badminton player Pitchamon Opatniputh became the first known doping case of the Games after testing positive for the banned diuretic furosemide. The International Testing Agency (ITA) said she had been notified of an apparent anti-doping rule violation and provisionally suspended pending resolution of the case. On 26 September, Turkmen karateka Dayanch Keletliyev tested positive for meldonium. The next day, Uzbek mixed martial artist Nodirbek Shavkatov, bronze medallist in the men's modern 71 kg event, became the first medallist of the Games to fail a drug test after meldonium was found in a sample collected out of competition on 22 September; he was provisionally suspended. Uzbek canoeist Pavel Eigel was also provisionally suspended after an adverse finding in a sample collected on 23 September.

=== Judging controversies ===
On 21 September 2026, following the women's traditional 60kg mixed martial arts semi-finals, Indian fighter Suchika Tariyal was criticised for unsportsman behaviour for refusing to shake the hand of her competitor, Singaporean Tiffany Teo, after losing in a controversial tiebreaker match. The bout ended in a draw after the second period resulting in a one minute extra time period, during which Tariyal managed to get Teo down just as the buzzer sounded. Both athletes initially celebrated afterwards, however the referee ruled in Teo's favour.

India lodged a controversial challenge which saw the result for the second period declared a draw with the winner being determined based on each athlete's weigh-in that morning, which Teo also won. Tariyal was visibly upset by the decision and did not initially shake hands with her opponent or the referee, only doing so after being consoled by her coach. She eventually took the bronze medal in that event, India's first ever Asian Games medal in mixed martial arts. Teo later took gold, Singapore's first gold medal of the Games.

== See also ==
- Asian Games celebrated in Japan
  - 1958 Asian Games – Tokyo
  - 1994 Asian Games – Hiroshima
- 2026 Asian Para Games

== Notes ==
Preceded by Hangzhou	Asian Games; Aichi Prefecture and Nagoya; XX Asian Games (2026)	Succeeded by Doha
