= Surfing at the Asian Games =

Surfing competitions at the Asian Games

- Governing bodies
- Events: 0 (mixed)

Games
- 1951; 1954; 1958; 1962; 1966; 1970; 1974; 1978; 1982; 1986; 1990; 1994; 1998; 2002; 2006; 2010; 2014; 2018; 2022; 2026
- Medalists

Surfing made its official competitive debut at the Asian Games during the 2026 Asian Games held in Aichi–Nagoya, Japan. The continental multi-sport competition runs under the technical regulation of the Olympic Council of Asia (OCA) alongside the Asian Surfing Federation (ASF).

Following the successful inclusion of surfing at the 2020 Summer Olympics in Tokyo and its continuation at the 2024 Summer Olympics in Paris, the Olympic Council of Asia officially approved the sport's integration into the core Asian Games program to capture growing international engagement with youth-centric action sports.

== History ==
=== Olympic pathways and inclusion ===
Following the successful integration and popular debut of surfing at the 2020 Summer Olympics in Tokyo and its continuation at the 2024 Summer Olympics in Paris, the Olympic Council of Asia (OCA) faced mounting pressure to capture the international momentum surrounding youth-centric action sports. In line with the OCA's strategic efforts to modernize the continental sports program, the federation officially approved surfing's inclusion into the core program of the Asian Games cycle.

Prior to its introduction to the main Asian Games program, surfing made early continental multi-sport appearances under variant formats, notably featuring at the Asian Beach Games starting with the inaugural 2008 edition in Bali, Indonesia. Furthermore, the 2026 Asian Games tournament was designated by the International Surfing Association (ISA) as a crucial link in the global pyramid, acting as the definitive pathway to award the first Continental qualification slots for the 2028 Summer Olympics in Los Angeles.

=== Inaugural debut (2026) ===
The sport made its definitive primary debut at the 2026 Asian Games in Aichi Nagoya, Japan, with competitions held from September 25 to September 29, 2026. The inaugural iteration featured a field of 48 competitors representing 17 National Olympic Committees (NOCs), establishing a landmark geographic expansion for the sport as developing surfing nations like Bangladesh and Afghanistan successfully fielded athletes via continental qualifying pathways.

== Events ==
Surfing at the Asian Games centers on shortboard events, divided equally by gender to mirror the format established by the International Surfing Association (ISA) for Olympic competition.

Event	2026	Years
Men's shortboard	X	1
Women's shortboard	X	1
Total Events	2	

== Competition format and venues ==
Due to the geographic and meteorological requirements of wave riding, surfing competitions are held at coastal ocean beach venues rather than the primary centralized stadium clusters of the host cities. The inaugural events were held at Akabane Long Beach in Tahara, a location renowned for consistent swells along the Pacific coast of Japan.

Competitions are conducted using standard heat-based elimination brackets. Surfers are evaluated by a panel of judges scoring individual waves on a scale of 0.1 to 10.0 based on speed, power, flow, and the difficulty of maneuvers executed on the wave face.

== Qualification framework ==
The qualification pathways for the Asian Games are governed directly by the Asian Surfing Federation. The total athlete quota is strictly limited to 48 competitors (24 men and 24 women), with National Olympic Committees (NOCs) restricted to entering a maximum of four athletes (two per gender).

=== Continental ranking pathways ===
Direct entry slots were earned based on competitive performance over a two-year cycle via the Asian Surfing Championships (ASC). Under the official ASF framework, quota places were distributed as follows:

- Regional Zone Champions: The highest-ranked NOC from each of the five designated Asian surfing regions (Central, East, South, Southeast, and West Asia) earned 1 automatic quota spot per gender at both the 2024 and 2025 championships.
- Open Quota Allocation: The remaining 14 available positions per gender were awarded equally based on the overall multi-nation open tier standings across both qualifying iterations.

=== Qualifying cycles (2024–2025) ===
The definitive trials were split across two major continental championship events:

1. 2024 Asian Surfing Championships (Thulusdhoo, Maldives): Held from August 17–24, 2024, this event secured the first major wave of qualifiers, including regional zone titles for nations such as Iran (Central), China (East), the Maldives (South), and Indonesia (Southeast).
2. 2025 Asian Surfing Championships (Mahabalipuram, India): Held from August 3–12, 2025, in Tamil Nadu, this served as the final direct qualification meet. Notable performances, such as South Korea's Kanoa Heejae taking the men's open gold, finalized the provisional team allotments for the Games.

== Editions ==
Edition	Year	Host City	Host Nation	Venue	Best Nation
XX	2026	Nagoya	Japan	Akabane Long Beach, Tahara	Japan

== Medal table ==
Rank	Nation	Gold	Silver	Bronze	Total
1	Japan (JPN)	2	0	1	3
2	China (CHN)	0	1	0	1
2	Indonesia (INA)	0	1	0	1
4	Philippines (PHI)	0	0	1	1
Totals (4 entries)		2	2	2	6

== Participation ==
A total of 17 nations qualified and fielded athletes in the surfing competitions at the Asian Games:

- Afghanistan
- Bangladesh
- China
- India
- Indonesia
- Iran
- Japan
- Lebanon
- Malaysia
- Maldives
- Philippines
- Saudi Arabia
- Singapore
- South Korea
- Sri Lanka
- Chinese Taipei
- Thailand

== See also ==
- Surfing at the Summer Olympics
- Asian Surfing Championships
