= Shuwa System =

Japanese publishing company (1974–2025)

Shuwa System Co., Ltd
- Native name: 株式会社秀和システム
- Romanized name: Kabushiki gaisha Shūwa Shisutemu
- Type: Kabushiki gaisha
- Industry: Information and communication
- Founded: December 1974
- Defunct: 4 July 2025 (bankruptcy estate established)
- Headquarters: Toyo, Kōtō, Tokyo
- Key people: Takeshi Nagano (bankruptcy trustee)
- Products: Personal computer and business book publishing Original software plans, releases, and sales
- Website: www.shuwasystem.co.jp

Shuwa System Co., Ltd (株式会社秀和システム, Kabushiki gaisha Shūwa Shisutemu) was a Japanese publisher. It published books that were about personal computers, business, and other topics. It began bankruptcy proceedings on 4 July 2025. Shuwa System Shinsha of the Two Virgins Group inherited the publisher's business.

== History ==
The company was founded in December 1974. During this time, it was a dormant company. Seven years later, the company reopened its business as Shuwa System Trading. In 1983, the company was accused of software piracy by Microsoft. In 1995, it changed its name to Shuwa System. Eleven years later, Shuwa System became a subsidiary of MCJ. On 22 December 2015, MCJ transferred all shares of Shuwa System to Ueno Group, and the company was under the capital stock of Ueno Group. On 15 February 2016, Shuwa System amalgamated Ueno Group in a reverse takeover; five years later, it acquired Funai in a takeover.

On 1 July 2025, Shuwa System went into insolvency, and the publication business had trouble continuing operations. A declaration about the publication business being transferred to another company was made. Three days later, the company received commencement of bankruptcy proceedings from the Tokyo District Court. The total debt was about ¥5 billion. The next week, Two Virgins Group received the publication business's transfer, and the same group's Warm and Beautiful announced that it changed its name to Kabushiki Gaisha Shuwa System Shinsha. On 8 September 2025, Shuwa System Shinsha disseminated a press release about starting its publication business.
