= MCJ =

MCJ may refer to:

- MCJ (company), a Japanese company
- MCJ and Cool G, a former Canadian hip hop duo
- Men's Central Jail, a Los Angeles County jail
