= Yang Siqi =

Chinese surfer (born 2007)

Personal information
- Born: 10 February 2009 (age 17) Liangshan Yi Autonomous Prefecture, Sichuan, China

Sport
- Country: China
- Sport: Surfing
- Event: Shortboard
Medal record
Women's surfing
Representing China
Asian Games
| Silver medal – second place | 2026 Aichi–Nagoya | Women's shortboard |

Yang Siqi (Chinese: 杨思琪; pinyin: Yáng Sīqí; born 10 February 2009) is a Chinese surfer. She won the silver medal in the women's shortboard at the 2026 Asian Games.

== Early life ==
Yang was born in the mountain area of Liangshan Yi Autonomous Prefecture. She began her surfing career at the age of nine. At the age of 13, she already compete in the World Surf League.

== Career ==
Yang made her international debut at the 2019 World Junior Surfing Championships.

In 2024, Yang qualified to compete at the 2024 Summer Olympics that held in Teahupo'o reef pass, Tahiti, and reaching to the third round.

In 2026, Yang competed at the inaugural edition of surfing at the Asian Games. She won the silver medal in the women's shortboard.
