= Mirai Ikeda =

Japanese surfer (born 2007)

Personal information
- Born: 7 November 2007 (age 19) Omaezaki, Shizuoka Prefecture, Japan

Sport
- Country: Japan
- Sport: Surfing
- Event: Shortboard
Medal record
Women's surfing
Representing Japan
Asian Games
Gold medal – first place	2026 Aichi–Nagoya	Women's shortboard

Mirai Ikeda (池田 未来, Ikeda Mirai; born 7 November 2007) is a Japanese surfer. She won the gold medal in the women's shortboard at the 2026 Asian Games.

== Early life ==
Ikeda began her surfing career at a young age in her hometown of Omaezaki. In her juniors, she represented by K's Project, the same management agency as Shino Matsuda. She was selected as a designated "Elite Junior Athlete" in both 2020 and 2021.

== Career ==
In 2026, Ikeda competed at the inaugural edition of surfing at the Asian Games. She won the gold medal in the shortboard, and that qualified her to compete at the 2028 Olympics.
