= Iiyama (company) =

Japanese electronics company

iiyama Corporation
- Industry: Computer hardware, Electronics
- Founded: 1972 in Iiyama, Japan
- Founder: Kazuro Katsuyama
- Headquarters: 2-12-5 Iwamotochō, Chiyoda-ku, Tokyo, Japan
- Area served: Worldwide
- Key people: Shinji Takeichi (CEO)
- Products: Monitors
- Number of employees: 200+
- Website: iiyama.com

iiyama is a brand name of Mouse Computer Corporation (株式会社マウスコンピューター, Kabushiki Gaisha Mausu Konpyūtā). It produces liquid crystal display (LCD) monitors and LED display panels. It was previously an independent Japanese computer electronics company called iiyama Corporation (株式会社イーヤマ, Kabushikigaisha Īyama) with its headquarters in Chiyoda-ku, Tokyo. iiyama was founded in 1972 by Kazuro Katsuyama, named after the city of Iiyama in Nagano Prefecture, Japan. The company was bought in January 2006 by MCJ, which includes Mouse Computer Corporation. The headquarters of iiyama was moved to Europe in October 2008. The CEO since January 2006 has been Takeichi Shinji.

== History ==
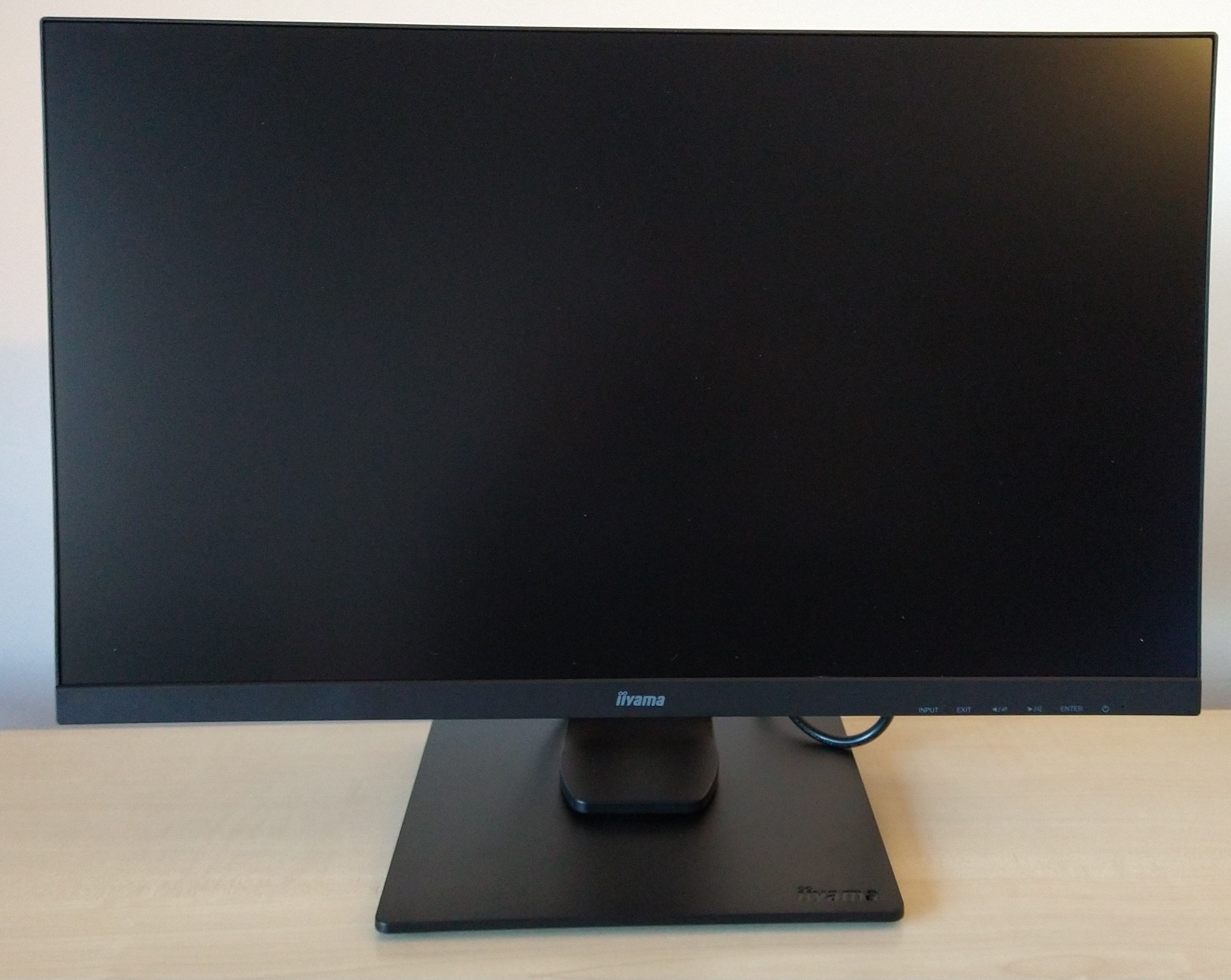
An iiyama monitor from 2019

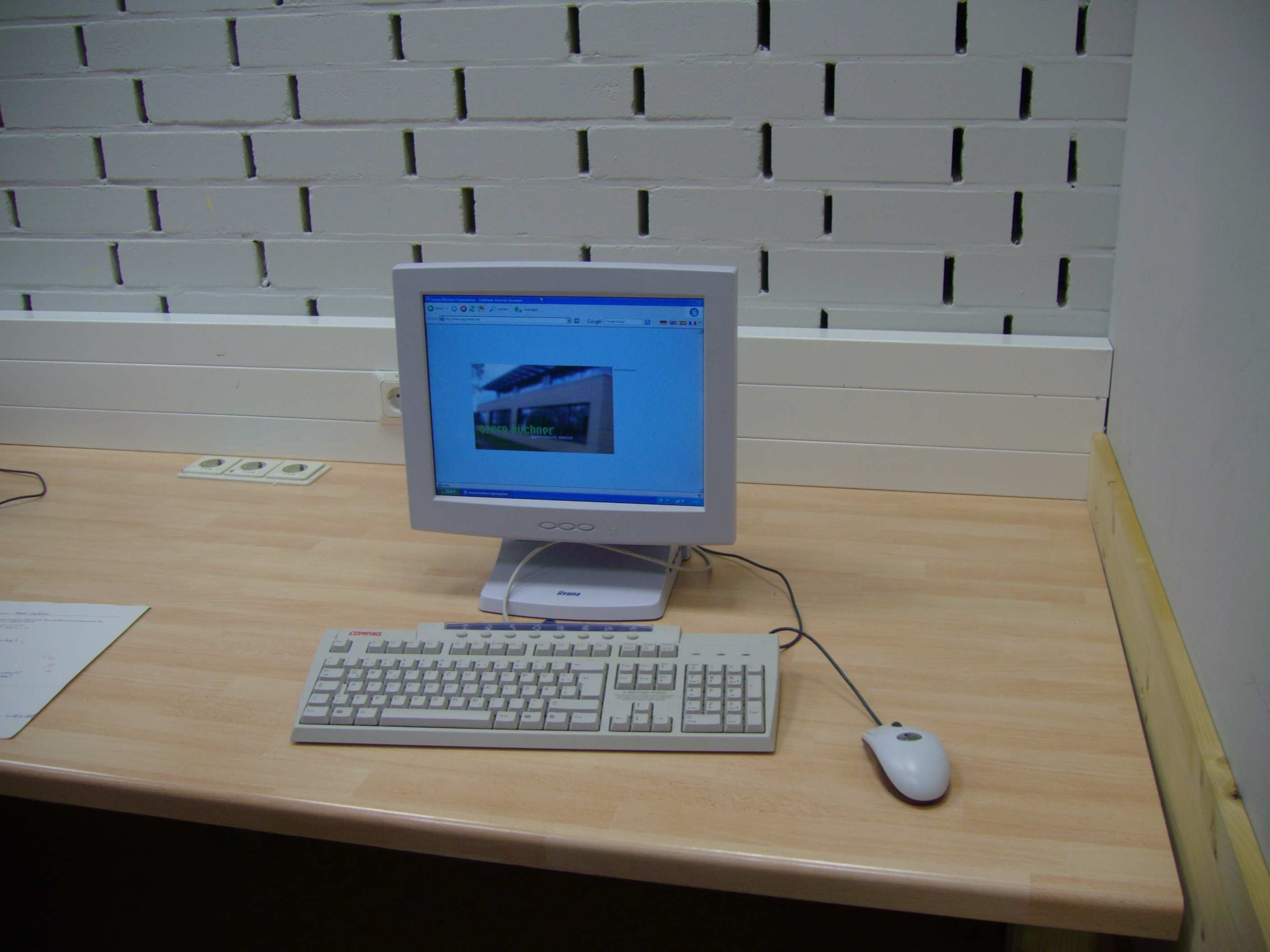
An iiyama monitor, shown with a keyboard and mouse

Founded in March 1972 as Iiyama Electric Corporation (飯山電機株式会社) by 23-year-old bank employee Kazuro Katsuyama, it first started manufacturing television boards and substrates for Mitsubishi at a local plant in Nagano Prefecture. They started producing black and white TVs in 1976 and color TVs in 1979, followed by computer monitors under its own brand name in 1981 which then became its main product range.

The company expanded to the Western market in 1987 and in the 1990s opened up offices in Philadelphia, Germany, Poland, France, UK, Sweden, the Czech Republic, Taiwan, and its international head office in the Netherlands, where it is registered as iiyama Benelux B.V. By 1993 it was the leading monitor supplier in Japan with a 21% market share. The first LCDs were released by iiyama in 1997.

In 2001 it merged with e-yama to create iiyama Co., Ltd. (株式会社イーヤマ), and its headquarters moved to Nagano. In 2006 holding company MCJ bought iiyama and renamed it to iiyama Co., Ltd. (株式会社iiyama), moving its base to Chūō, Tokyo. In October 2008 iiyama Corporation became part of Mouse Computer Co., Ltd., one of MCJ's companies.

== See also ==
- Iiyama Vision Master Pro series
