= Paloma Mizuho Sports Park =

Sports venue in Nagoya, Japan

- Mizuho Park (名古屋市瑞穂公園)
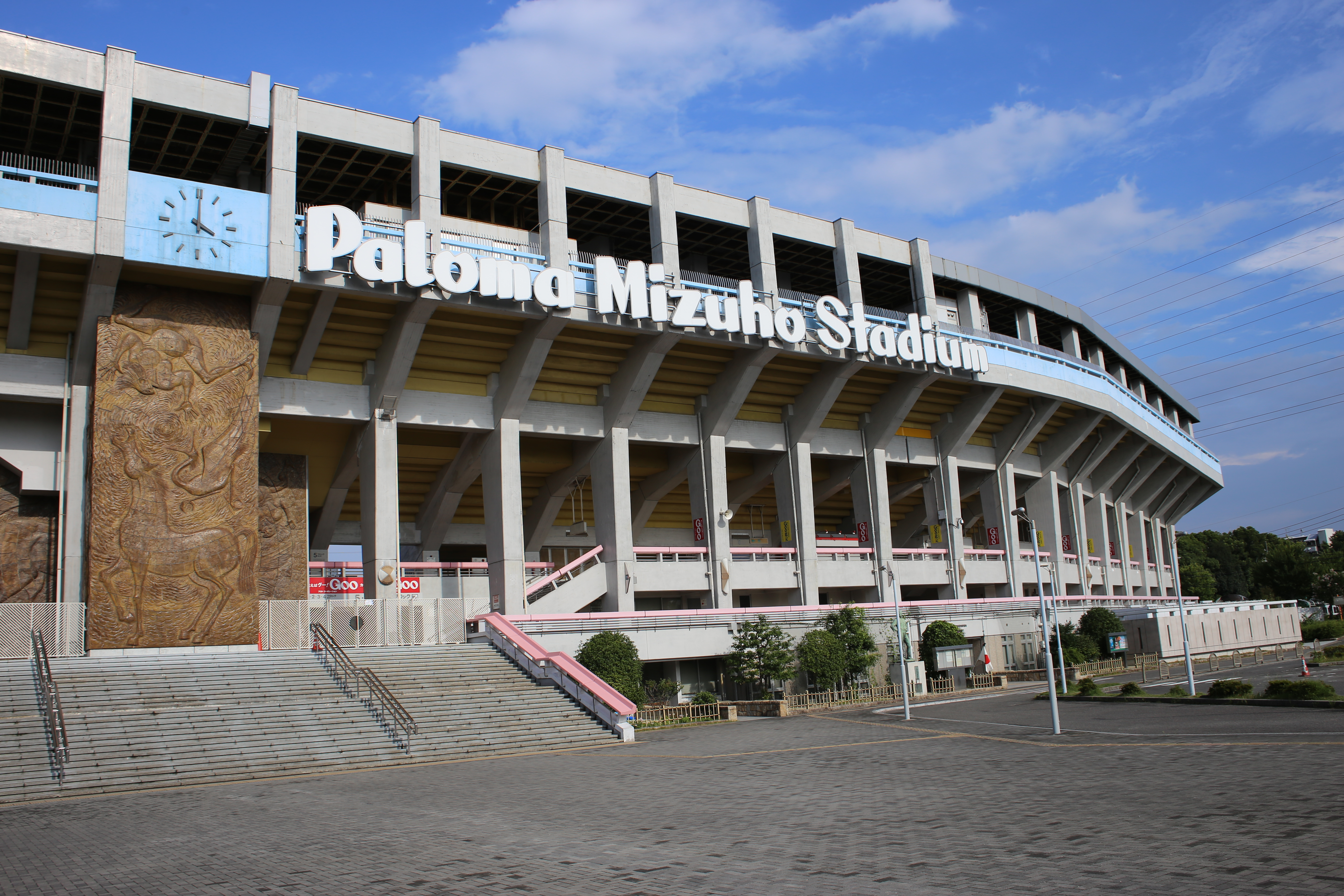
- Paloma Mizuho Stadium
- Interactive map of Paloma Mizuho Sports Park
- Type: Sports park
- Location: 5-1 Yamashita-dori, Mizuho-ku, Nagoya, Aichi Prefecture, Japan
- Coordinates: 35°07′21.72″N 136°56′34.72″E
- Area: 24.46 ha (60.4 acres)
- Owner: Nagoya
- Operator: Nagoya City Sports and Education Association

Paloma Mizuho Sports Park (Japanese: パロマ瑞穂スポーツパーク), formerly known as Nagoya City Mizuho Park (名古屋市瑞穂公園), is a sports park in Mizuho-ku, Nagoya, Aichi Prefecture, Japan. It covers approximately 24.46 ha (60.4 acres) and contains a number of sports facilities, including an athletics stadium, rugby ground, baseball stadium, gymnasium, tennis courts and swimming facilities.

The park is designated as a municipal sports park under the Nagoya City Mizuho Park Ordinance. The fee-based sports facilities within the park are collectively referred to as Mizuho Sports Ground.

== Facilities ==
The park contains several major sporting facilities.

=== Paloma Mizuho Stadium ===
The park's main athletics stadium is used for athletics and association football. It is one of the principal facilities of the sports complex.

=== Paloma Mizuho North Athletics Field ===
The North Athletics Field is a Japan Association of Athletics Federations Class 3 certified athletics stadium. It has an all-weather 400-metre track with eight lanes, a natural-grass field and seating for approximately 3,000 spectators.

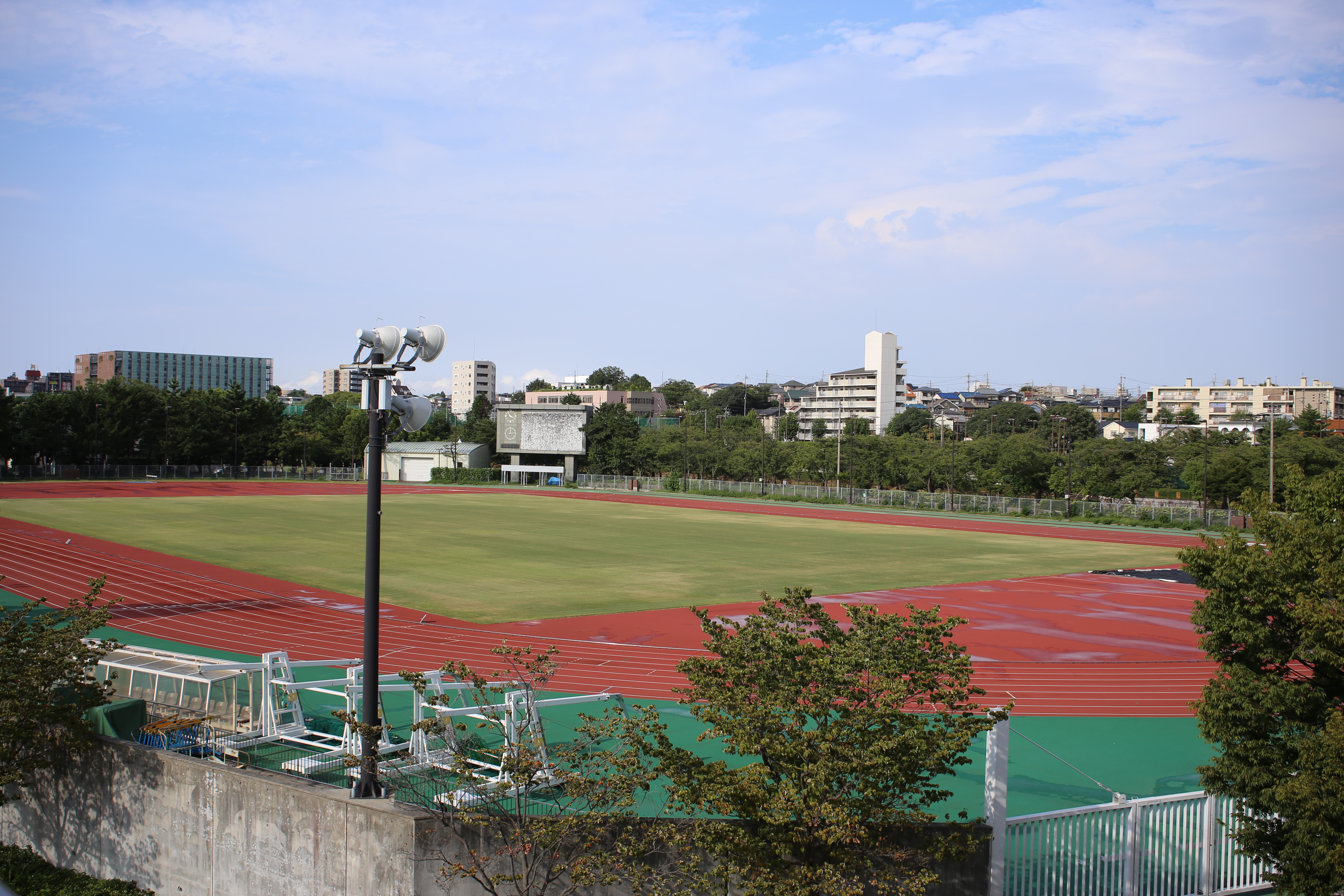
Paloma Mizuho North Athletics Field

=== Paloma Mizuho Arena ===
Paloma Mizuho Arena is an indoor sports facility containing three competition halls and meeting rooms. It was constructed on the former site of Tanabe Athletics Field.

Paloma Mizuho Arena

=== Paloma Mizuho Rugby Stadium ===
The park contains a rugby stadium and a separate rugby practice ground.

Paloma Mizuho Rugby Stadium

=== Paloma Mizuho Baseball Stadium ===
The baseball stadium has a field measuring approximately 14,411 m^{2} (155,120 sq ft), with 99.1 m (325 ft) foul lines and a 122 m (400 ft) centre-field distance. It has seating for approximately 18,600 spectators.

Paloma Mizuho Baseball Stadium

=== Other facilities ===
Other facilities in the park include:

- Paloma Mizuho Sumo Arena
- Paloma Mizuho Tennis Courts
- Archery range
- Kyūdō range
- Indoor swimming pool
- Training pool
- Training room
- Accommodation and training rooms
- Recreation area

The tennis complex has nine courts and seating for approximately 1,000 spectators.

== Recreation ==
In addition to its sports facilities, the park contains several public recreation areas, including East Plaza, South Plaza, North Plaza, Light Plaza, Children's Plaza, Waterfront Plaza, Kage Plaza, Komorebi Plaza and Yasuragi Plaza. The park also contains the Oguruwa shell midden, a prehistoric archaeological site, as well as walking paths and pedestrian bridges.

== Naming rights ==
In January 2015, Paloma was selected as the naming-rights sponsor for the facilities of Mizuho Sports Ground. The naming-rights agreement began on 1 April 2015 for an annual fee of ¥60 million.

Under the agreement, the complex became known as Paloma Mizuho Sports Park, while individual facilities received Paloma-branded names. However, official facility names are used for certain international competitions subject to naming-rights restrictions, including competitions governed by international federations.

The park is scheduled to serve as the main venue for the 2026 Asian Games, jointly hosted by Aichi Prefecture and Nagoya.

== Transportation ==
The park is served by the Nagoya Municipal Subway.

- Mizuho Sports Stadium Station on the Meijō Line is approximately 3–10 minutes' walk away.
- Mizuho Sports Ground West Station on the Sakura-dori Line is approximately 10–15 minutes' walk away.
- Aratamabashi Station on the Meijō and Sakura-dori lines is approximately 10 minutes' walk away.
