= Iiyama Vision Master Pro =

The Iiyama Vision Master Pro computer monitor line was manufactured by Iiyama, a high-end manufacturer of LCD and CRT monitors, as an advanced version of the Vision Master line.

== Overview ==
This CRT monitor was manufactured in the 1990s, and has been discontinued. For a year from April 1997 to April 1998, this monitor was at the top of PCWorld's chart as a Best Buy. According to PC Pro magazine, it dominated the UK monitor market at around that period.

This line was succeeded by the Iiyama Vision Master ProLite LCD monitor series, later rebranded as simply ProLite.

== Models ==
=== Vision Master Pro 17 ===
The Iiyama Vision Master Pro 17 computer monitor was released by Iiyama in 1997.

==== Technical specifications ====
Screen - The monitor was a CRT with a phosphor area diagonal: 41 cm (16 in), dot pitch of 0.26 mm. The screen had a short persistence phosphor with an anti-reflection and anti-static coating. The horizontal sync frequency was 27.0–86.0 kHz, and the vertical sync frequency was 50–160 Hz. The maximum video resolution was 1600 × 1200, non-interlaced. In 2000 this model received a tube upgrade: a Mitsubishi Diamondtron FD tube with 0.24 mm dot pitch was equipped.

Video connectors - The two standard input connections are 5-BNC and D-sub mini 15 pin.

Power - The monitor operated on a standard 120 V 60 Hz line or 230 V 50 Hz, consuming a maximum of 110 W of power. Standby power was 10 W maximum, and suspend mode was 6 W maximum.

=== Pro 400 ===
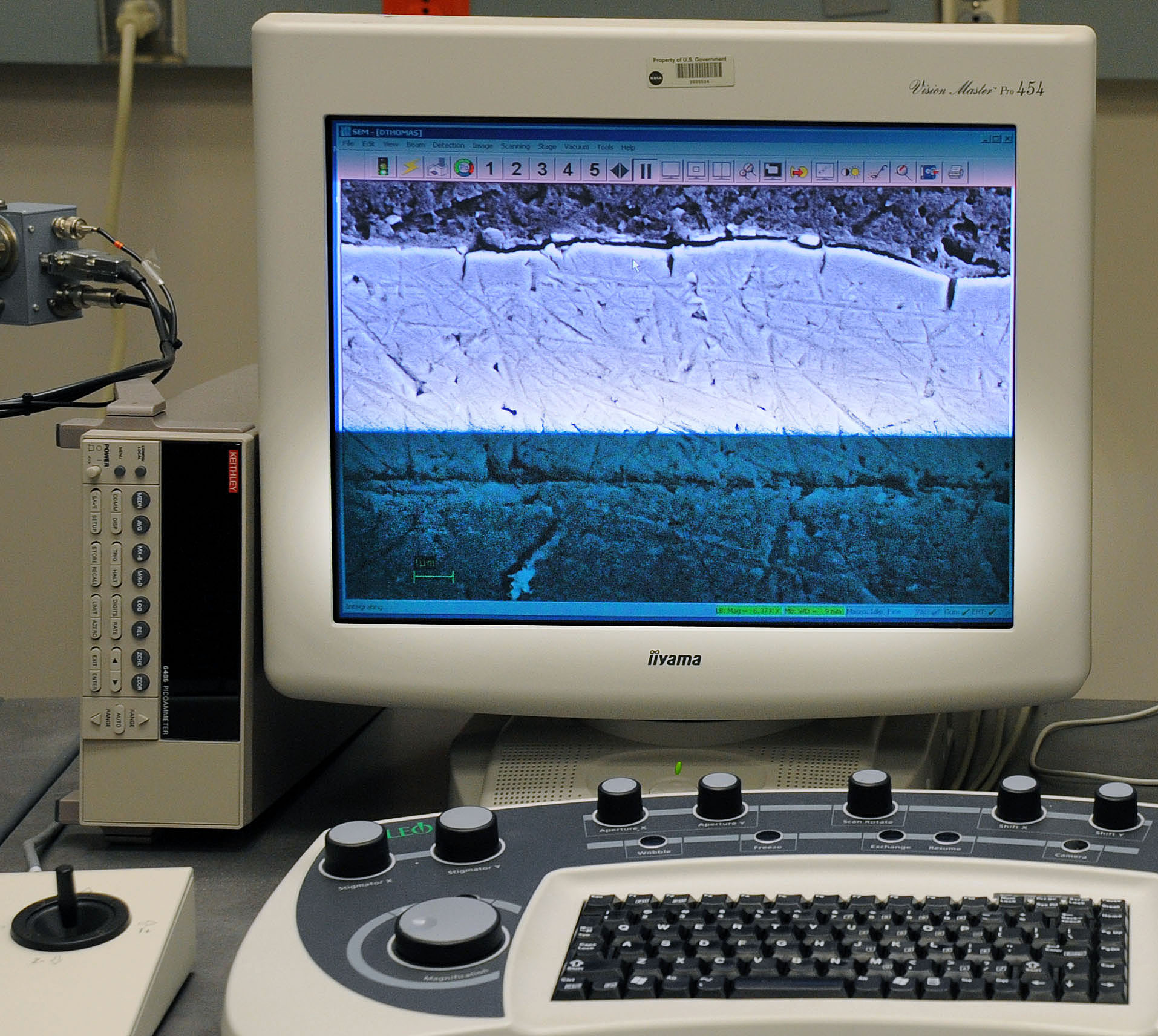
Iiyama Vision Master Pro 454, at NASA Space Flight Center

=== Pro 510 ===
Released in 1999
