= Surfing at the 2026 Asian Games =

- Venue: Akabane Long Beach
- Dates: 26–28 September 2026
- Competitors: 44 from 16 nations

Surfing competitions at the 2026 Asian Games are scheduled to be held between September 25 and 29, 2026 at Akabane Long Beach beach in Tahara, Japan. This marked the sport's debut at the Asian Games.

A total of two shortboard events, one per gender, were contested.

== Medal summary ==
=== Medal table ===
* Host nation (Japan)

Rank	NOC's	Gold	Silver	Bronze	Total
1	Japan*	2	0	1	3
2	China	0	1	0	1
2	Indonesia	0	1	0	1
4	Philippines	0	0	1	1
Totals (4 entries)		2	2	2	6

=== Medalists ===
Event	Gold	Silver	Bronze
Men's shortboard	Kanoa Igarashi; Japan	I Made Pajar Ariyana; Indonesia	Jayuard Alciso; Philippines
Women's shortboard	Mirai Ikeda; Japan	Yang Siqi; China	Minami Nonaka; Japan

== Qualification ==
A total of 48 surfers qualified to compete at the games. Each region in Asia was given a quota spot (for both genders) at each the 2024 and 2025 Asian Surfing Championships. The remaining 14 quotas per event were awarded equally among the two Asian Championships. A NOC could enter a maximum of surfers (two per gender). The final quota allocation was announced on June 5, 2026.

=== Qualification summary ===
NOC	Men	Women	Total
Afghanistan	1		1
Bangladesh	1	1	2
China	2	2	4
India	2	2	4
Indonesia	2	2	4
Iran	1		1
Japan	2	2	4
Lebanon	2		2
Malaysia	1	1	2
Maldives	2	2	4
Philippines	2	2	4
Singapore		1	1
South Korea	2	2	4
Sri Lanka	1		1
Chinese Taipei		2	2
Thailand	2	2	4
Total: 16 NOCs	23	21	44

=== Men ===
Event		Dates	Venue	Quota	Qualifier(s)
2024 Asian Surfing Championships top NOC per zone	Central	17–24 August 2024	(Maldives) Thulusdhoo	1	Iran
2024 Asian Surfing Championships top NOC per zone	East	17–24 August 2024	(Maldives) Thulusdhoo	1	China
2024 Asian Surfing Championships top NOC per zone	South	17–24 August 2024	(Maldives) Thulusdhoo	1	Maldives
2024 Asian Surfing Championships top NOC per zone	Southeast	17–24 August 2024	(Maldives) Thulusdhoo	1	Indonesia
2024 Asian Surfing Championships top NOC per zone	West	17–24 August 2024	(Maldives) Thulusdhoo	1	Lebanon
2024 Asian Surfing Championships next best NOC's		17–24 August 2024	(Maldives) Thulusdhoo	~~7~~ 6	Philippines; India; ~~Chinese Taipei~~; Sri Lanka; South Korea; Thailand; Bangladesh
2025 Asian Surfing Championships top NOC per zone	Central	2–11 August 2025	(India) Tamil Nadu	1	Afghanistan
2025 Asian Surfing Championships top NOC per zone	East	2–11 August 2025	(India) Tamil Nadu	1	South Korea
2025 Asian Surfing Championships top NOC per zone	South	2–11 August 2025	(India) Tamil Nadu	1	India
2025 Asian Surfing Championships top NOC per zone	Southeast	2–11 August 2025	(India) Tamil Nadu	1	Indonesia
2025 Asian Surfing Championships top NOC per zone	West	2–11 August 2025	(India) Tamil Nadu	1	Lebanon
2025 Asian Surfing Championships next best NOC's		2–11 August 2025	(India) Tamil Nadu	~~7~~ 6	China; Philippines; Malaysia; Japan; Thailand; ~~Chinese Taipei~~; Maldives
Reallocation		—N/a		1	Japan
				~~24~~ 23	

=== Women ===
Event		Dates	Venue	Quota	Qualifier(s)
2024 Asian Surfing Championships top NOC per zone	Central	17–24 August 2024	(Maldives) Thulusdhoo	~~1~~ 0	~~Iran~~
2024 Asian Surfing Championships top NOC per zone	East	17–24 August 2024	(Maldives) Thulusdhoo	1	Japan
2024 Asian Surfing Championships top NOC per zone	South	17–24 August 2024	(Maldives) Thulusdhoo	1	Maldives
2024 Asian Surfing Championships top NOC per zone	Southeast	17–24 August 2024	(Maldives) Thulusdhoo	1	Indonesia
2024 Asian Surfing Championships top NOC per zone	West	17–24 August 2024	(Maldives) Thulusdhoo	~~1~~ 0	~~Saudi Arabia~~
2024 Asian Surfing Championships next best NOC's		17–24 August 2024	(Maldives) Thulusdhoo	7	China; Philippines; Thailand; Chinese Taipei; South Korea; India; Singapore
2025 Asian Surfing Championships top NOC per zone	Central	2–11 August 2025	(India) Tamil Nadu	~~1~~ 0	—N/a
2025 Asian Surfing Championships top NOC per zone	East	2–11 August 2025	(India) Tamil Nadu	1	Japan
2025 Asian Surfing Championships top NOC per zone	South	2–11 August 2025	(India) Tamil Nadu	1	India
2025 Asian Surfing Championships top NOC per zone	Southeast	2–11 August 2025	(India) Tamil Nadu	1	Thailand
2025 Asian Surfing Championships top NOC per zone	West	2–11 August 2025	(India) Tamil Nadu	~~1~~ 0	~~Saudi Arabia~~
2025 Asian Surfing Championships next best NOC's		2–11 August 2025	(India) Tamil Nadu	~~7~~ 8	China; Indonesia; Chinese Taipei; South Korea; Philippines; Malaysia; Bangladesh; Maldives
				~~24~~ 21	

- No athlete from Central Asia was eligible, meaning an additional quota was available.
