= Aichi Prefectural Government Office =

Government building in Nagoya, Japan

Coordinates: 35°10′48.8″N 136°54′24.1″E

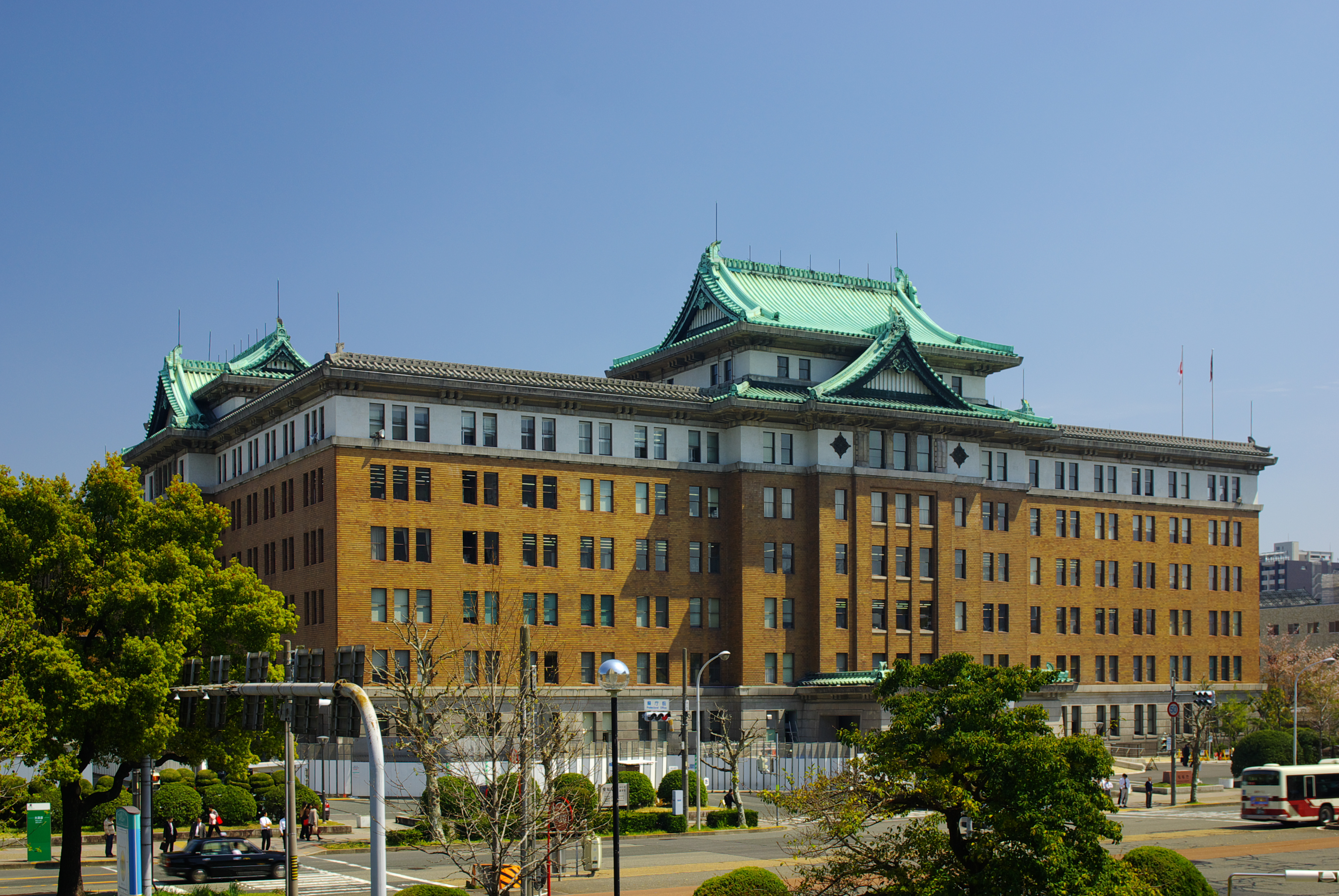
Main building of the Aichi Prefectural Office

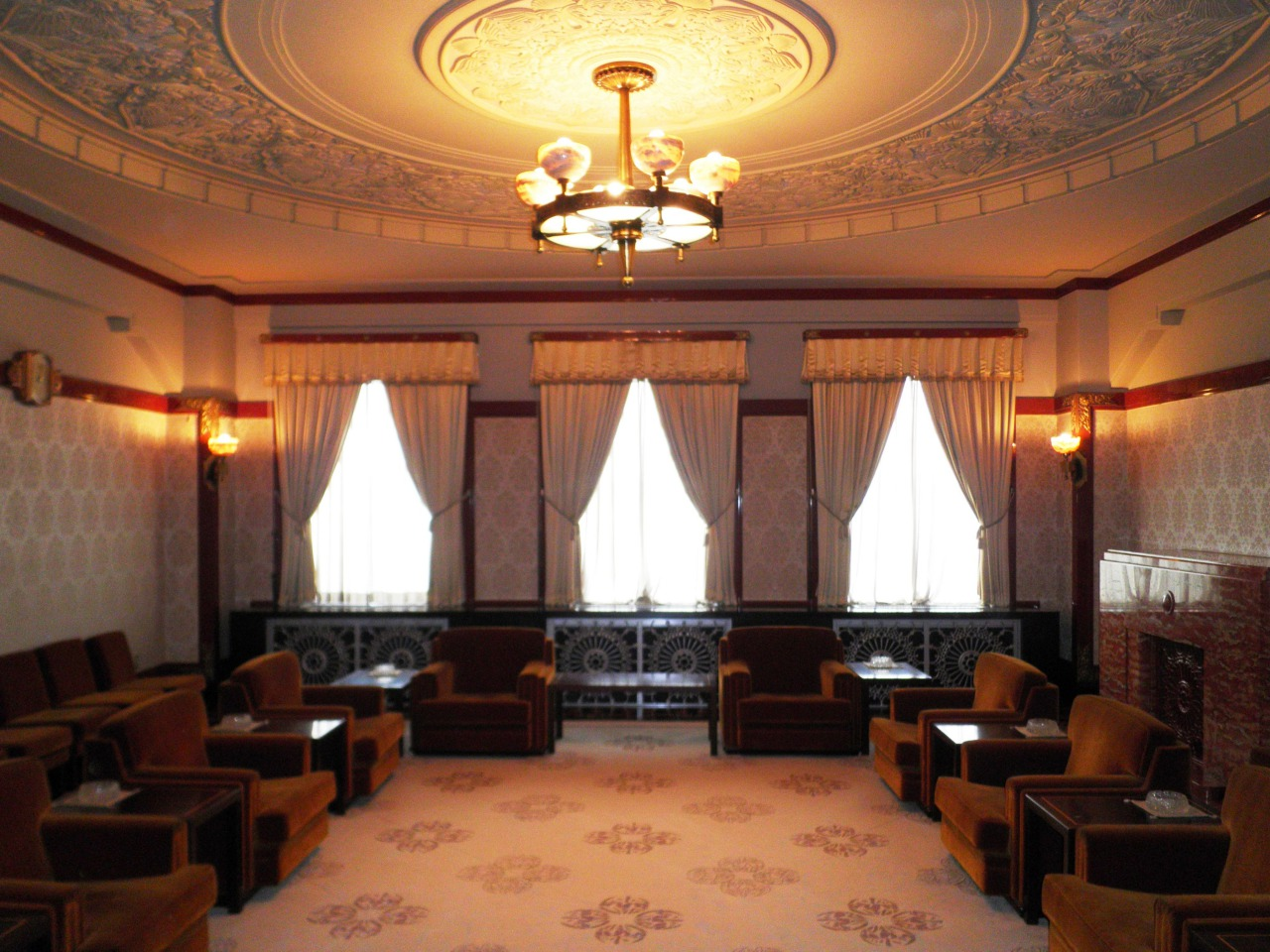
Room for honoured guests

The Aichi Prefectural Government Office (Japanese: 愛知県庁 Aichi Kenchō) is the main building of the government of Aichi Prefecture. It is located in the city of Nagoya.

== History ==
The building was constructed before the Second World War and is in the Imperial Crown style, a mixture of western and traditional Japanese architecture. The close proximity to Nagoya Castle is reflected in the decorative roof of the structure. It is located right next to Nagoya City Hall.

The building survived the U.S. air raids of World War II.
