= Furuhashi Hironoshin Memorial Hamamatsu Swimming Center =

Swimming venue in Hamamatsu, Japan

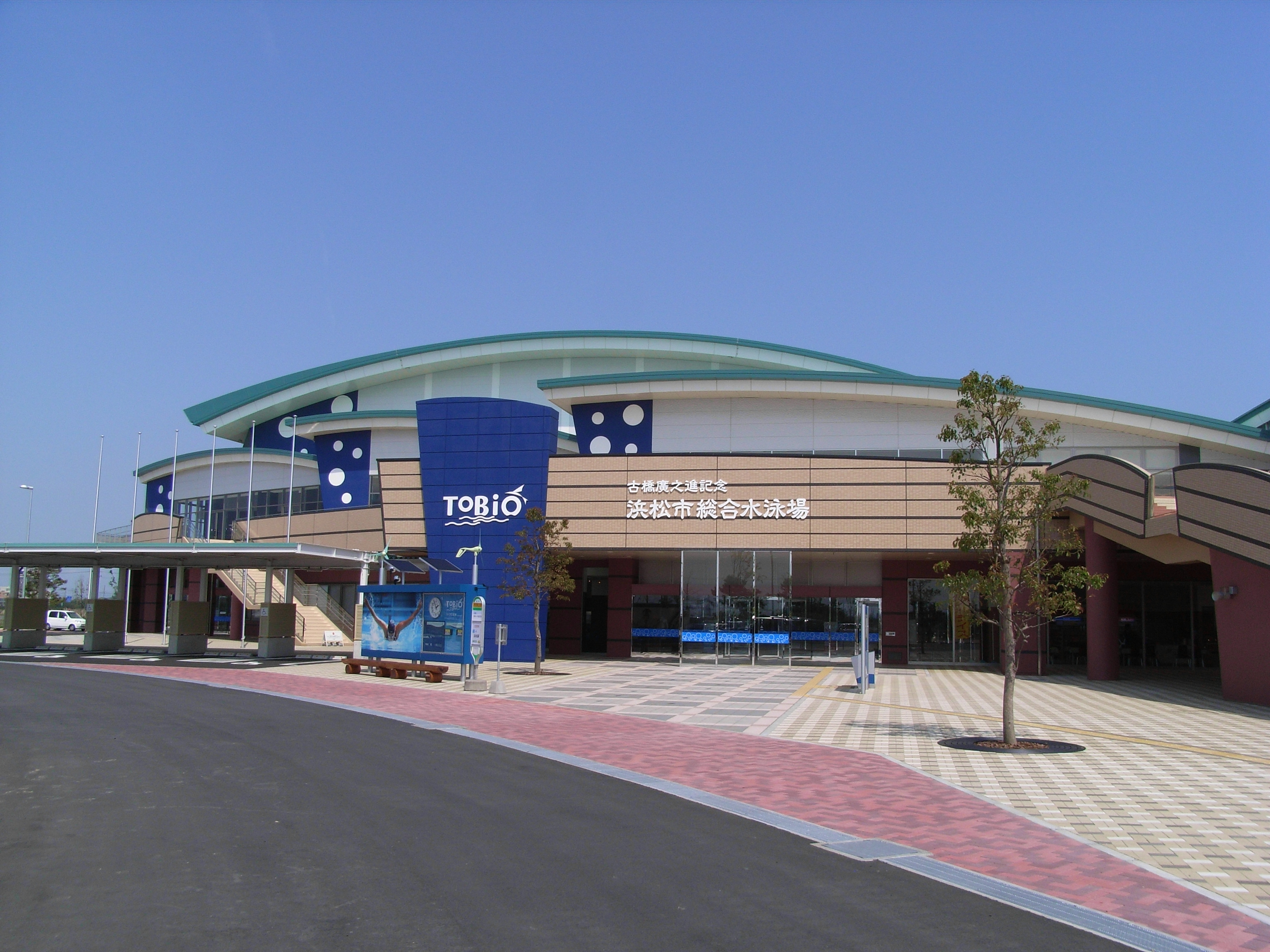
- Furuhashi Hironoshin Memorial Hamamatsu Swimming Center "ToBiO"
- Interactive map of Furuhashi Hironoshin Memorial Hamamatsu Swimming Center
- Full name: Furuhashi Hironoshin Memorial Hamamatsu Swimming Center "ToBiO"
- Address: 23982-1 Shinohara, Chūō-ku, Hamamatsu, Shizuoka Prefecture, Japan
- Coordinates: 34°40′31.29″N 137°40′15.63″E

Construction
- Opened: February 7, 2009

Furuhashi Hironoshin Memorial Hamamatsu Swimming Center (古橋廣之進記念浜松市総合水泳場, Furuhashi Hironoshin Kinen Hamamatsu-shi Sōgō Suieijō) is a swimming facility in Chūō-ku, Hamamatsu, Shizuoka Prefecture, Japan. It opened on February 7, 2009. The facility is commonly known by its nickname ToBiO.

The swimming center is operated under a designated management system by Hamamatsu Blue Wave, whose representative company is Central Sports Co., Ltd..

== Background ==
The swimming center was constructed together with the Seibu Waste Treatment Plant as Hamamatsu's first PFI project. It was also constructed as a successor to the municipal indoor swimming pool adjacent to the aging Enoshima Swimming Center.

A public competition was held to select the facility's nickname. The name ToBiO was chosen in connection with the achievements of swimmer Hironoshin Furuhashi, who was born in Hamamatsu. An exhibition area dedicated to Furuhashi's career and achievements is located inside the facility.

Furuhashi died in Rome, Italy, in August 2009 while visiting the city for the 2009 World Aquatics Championships, approximately six months after the swimming center opened.

The area surrounding the swimming center forms part of the Shinohara district expansion area of Enshūnada Coastal Park, which is being developed by Shizuoka Prefecture and Hamamatsu City. The 2016 basic concept for Enshūnada Coastal Park designated the area as a disaster-prevention and sports zone. Plans for the area include a baseball stadium intended to serve as a replacement site for Hamamatsu Stadium and facilities for disaster preparedness.

== Facilities ==
The swimming center has a total floor area of 17,752 m², a building area of 12,385 m², and a site area of 35,184 m². The building is constructed of reinforced concrete and steel and has two above-ground floors and one basement floor.

=== Pools ===
Pool	Dimensions and type	Certification	Notes
Main pool	50 m × 10 lanes; depth 0–3 m	International standard, 8 lanes	Equipped with a movable floor. Can also be divided into two short-course pools.
Diving pool	25 m × 25 m; depth 0–5 m	International standard	Equipped with a movable floor. Shares spectator seating with the main pool.
Sub pool	25 m × 8 lanes	National standard	Has separate spectator seating.
Leisure pools	Indoor leisure pool; children's and infants' pool; outdoor leisure pool; outdoor children's pool		The outdoor leisure pool and outdoor children's pool operate only during summer. The outdoor children's pool is free of charge.

The facility also includes a gym and studios, a bath and sauna, a restaurant, a museum room documenting the history of swimming in Japan, a shop, and a swim mill, a vertically circulating water tank available for exclusive use.

== History ==
In 2009, the year the swimming center opened, it hosted the Japan Swimming Championships, the 54th Japan Swimming Technique Championships, and the 26th Japan Para Swimming Championships.

In 2010, the facility hosted the first All-Japan Student Lifesaving Pool Competition.

In 2011, the 2011 Tōhoku earthquake and tsunami caused damage to the Tokyo Tatsumi International Swimming Center, resulting in the cancellation of the Japan Swimming Championships. A selection meet for athletes for international competitions was subsequently held at ToBiO as a replacement.

In 2013, the swimming center hosted the Japan Open in synchronized swimming, and in 2015 it hosted the Japan Intercollegiate Swimming Championships.

The Tobiuo Cup National Children's Swimming Competition, which had previously been held at the outdoor 50-meter pool of Enoshima Swimming Center, moved to ToBiO from its 24th edition in 2009. The 30-minute swimming endurance event has also been held at ToBiO since 2009.

In September 2011, approximately one-third of the roof was blown away by Typhoon Talas. The main pool, sub pool and gymnasium resumed operations relatively quickly, while the diving pool remained closed for a period before subsequently reopening.

=== Major competitions ===
- 2009 – Japan Swimming Championships
- 2011 – International competition national team selection meet
- 2013 – Japan Open in synchronized swimming
- 2015 – Japan Intercollegiate Swimming Championships
- 2022 – Tsubasa Japan Diving Cup and international competition national team selection meet

== Transportation ==
=== Public transportation ===
The swimming center can be reached from Hamamatsu Station on the Tokaido Shinkansen and Tokaido Main Line. Entetsu Bus services from platform 4 of the Hamamatsu Station Bus Terminal operate on route 16-4 via Kasuga-chō and Horie-chō to Hamamatsu Swimming Center. The journey takes approximately 30 minutes.

=== By car ===
From the Shizuoka direction, the facility can be reached from the Hamamatsu Interchange of the Tōmei Expressway by traveling toward Toyohashi on National Route 1, turning left at the Shinohara-higashi intersection, and continuing for approximately 500 meters.

From the Nagoya direction, drivers can exit at the Hamamatsu Nishi Interchange, turn right onto Shizuoka Prefectural Route 65, travel south, continue straight through the Tsuboi-chō intersection on National Route 1, turn left approximately 300 meters later, and continue for approximately 1.5 kilometers.
