= Akabane Long Beach =

Surfing beach and sports venue in Tahara, Aichi Prefecture, Japan

- 赤羽根ロングビーチ
- Pacific Long Beach
- Interactive map of Akabane Long Beach
- Address: Japan
- Location: 137 Ishiki, Takamatsucho, Tahara, Aichi Prefecture
- Coordinates: 34.6072°N 137.2144°E
- Owner: Tahara City
- Type: Sand beach, coastal break

Tenants
- 2026 Asian Games (Surfing); All Japan Surfing Championships

Akabane Long Beach, commonly referred to internationally as Pacific Long Beach, is a prominent coastal sand beach and surfing venue situated along the southern Omotehama Coast of the Atsumi Peninsula in Tahara, Aichi Prefecture, Japan. Facing the Pacific Ocean, the beach is widely recognized within Japanese maritime sports culture as a premier domestic break, serving as a frequent host site for major national and international surfing competitions since 1995. It was selected by the Aichi-Nagoya Asian Games Organizing Committee (AINAGOC) as the official home venue for surfing's program debut during the 2026 Asian Games.

== Surf characteristics and environment ==
The beach is characterized by wide sandy expanses and a steady coastal wind profile generated by its geography on the Atsumi Peninsula. Its orientation to the Pacific Ocean exposes the venue to multi-directional oceanic swells, allowing for consistent, year-round wave sets that accommodate shortboard and longboard disciplines alike.

Peak wave quality is generally recorded during the late summer and early autumn months, coinciding with the Northwest Pacific typhoon season (August to October), which produces optimal high-energy swell conditions. The venue features well-developed public support facilities directly flanking the dunes, including continuous Wi-Fi access, permanent locker facilities, public showers, and administrative layout space for judging structures.

== Major events ==
Akabane Long Beach has long served as a core competitive hub for the Nippon Surfing Association (NSA) and the Asian Surfing Federation (ASF). The beach frequently acts as the baseline site for the All Japan Surfing Championships. In September 2026, the venue transitioned into a continental multi-sport facility for the 2026 Asian Games surfing competition.

The events saw temporary viewing scaffolding deployed along National Highway 42 and the surrounding clifftop roadways to accommodate international media and spectators.

== Access ==
The beach is located adjacent to Japan National Route 42. By rail, it is accessed via the Toyohashi Railroad Atsumi Line, terminating at Mikawa-Tahara Station, where public shuttle links operate down to the Akabane beach boundary during official competitive meets.
