= Nagoya City Hall =

Government building in Nagoya, Japan

Coordinates: 35°10′53.21″N 136°54′22.92″E

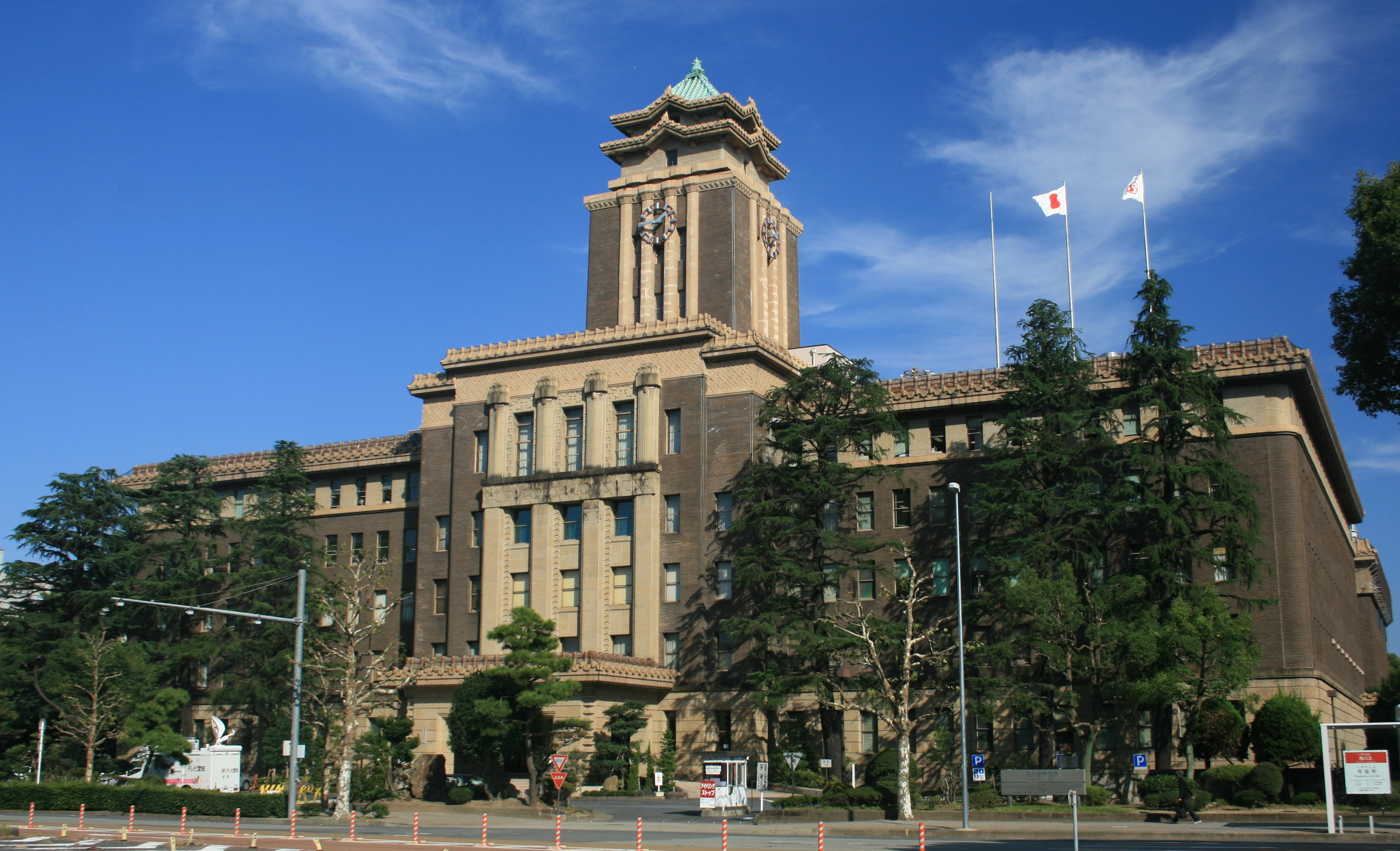
Nagoya City Hall

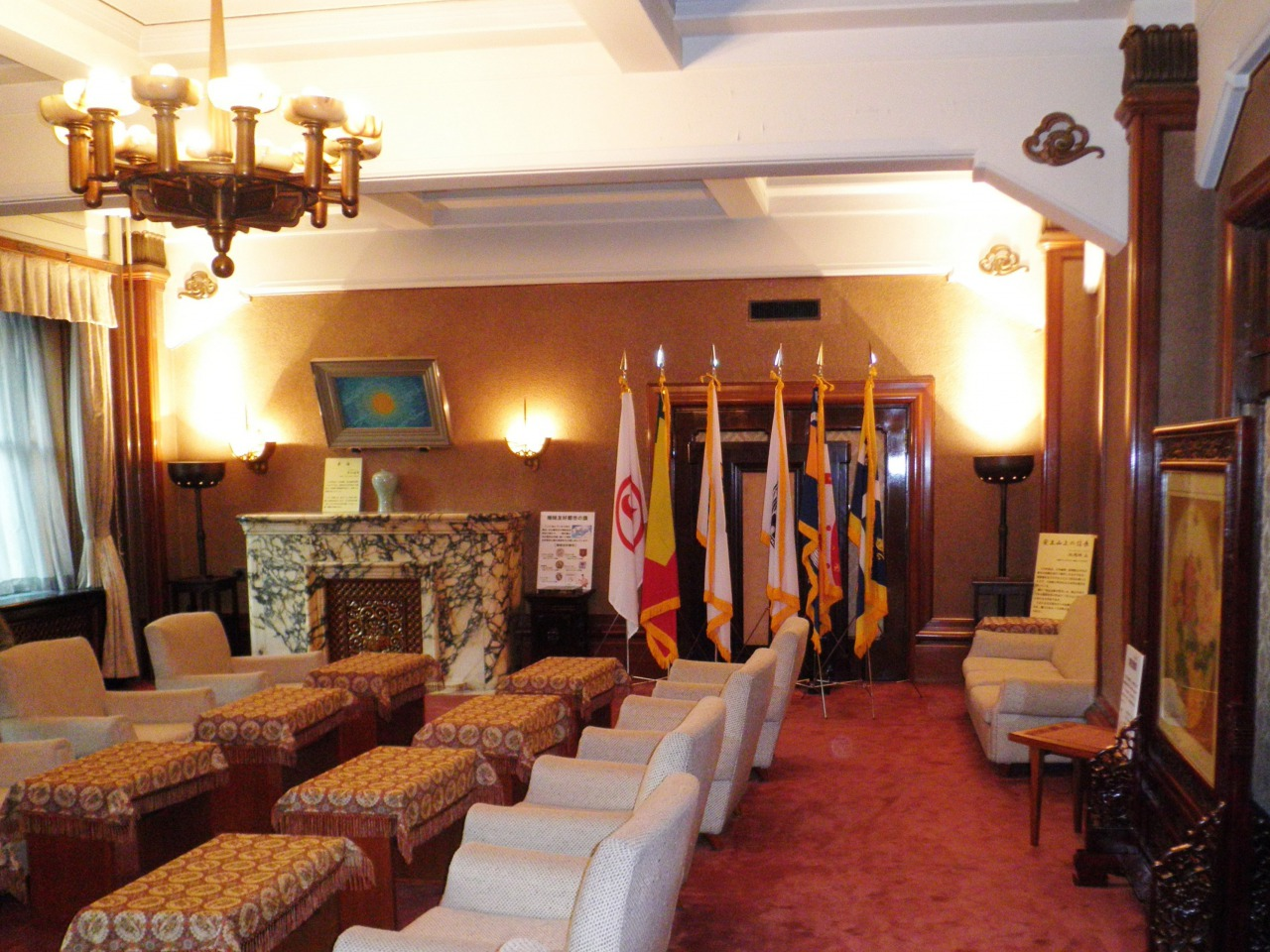
Room for honoured guests

Nagoya City Hall (名古屋市役所, Nagoya Shiyakusho) is the city hall of the city of Nagoya, Japan.

It is designed in the Imperial Crown style, a fusion Japanese and modern style. It survived the bombings of World War II and is registered as a Tangible Cultural Property of Japan.

It is located close to the Aichi Prefectural Government Office.

== History ==
The present main building was built on September 6, 1933.

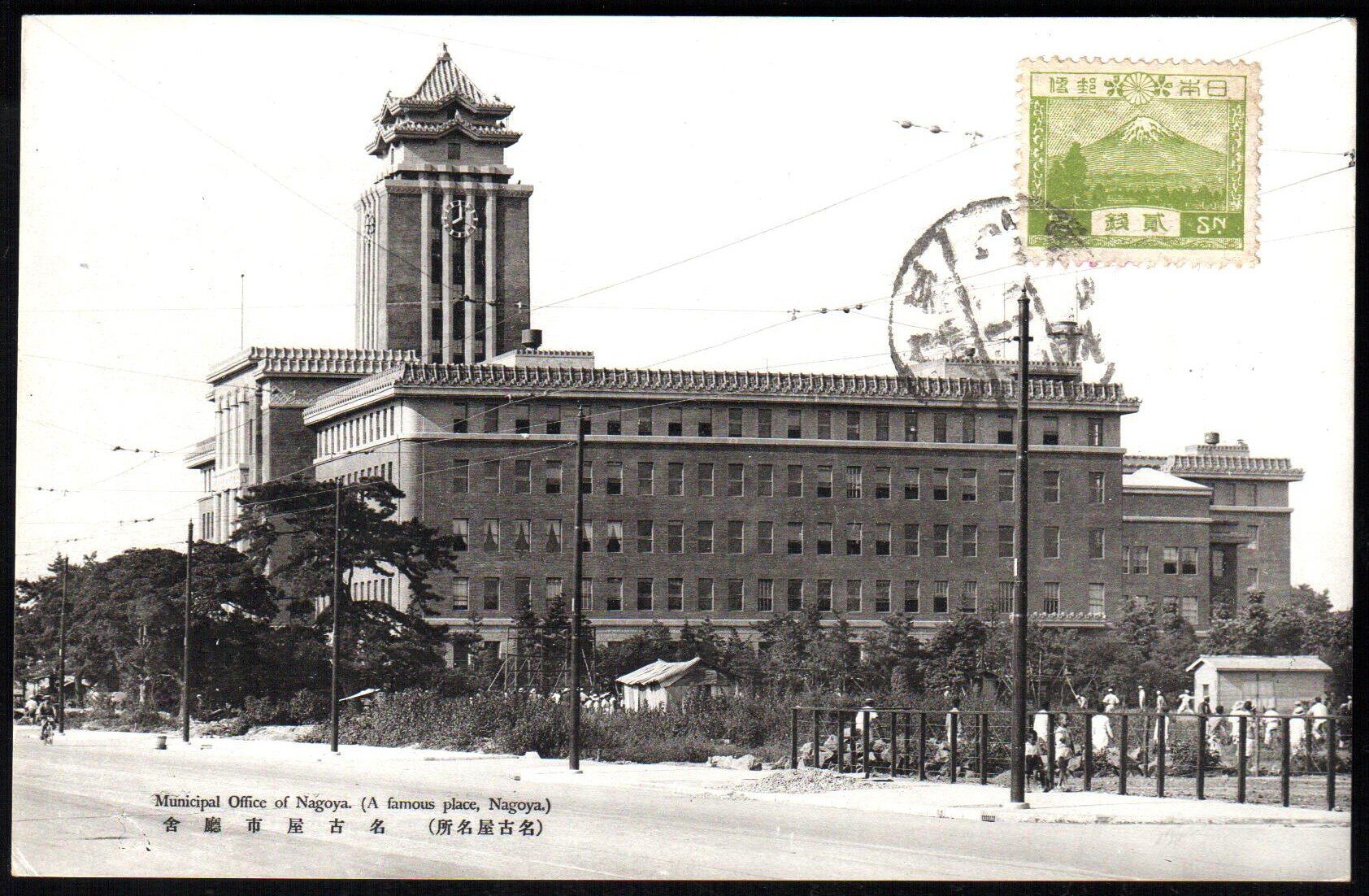
Japan 1934 stamped photo postcard showing the municipal office of Nagoya

== Location ==
1-1, Sannomaru 3-chome, Naka-ku, Nagoya, Japan (Postal code 460-8508).
