= MCJ (company) =

Japanese holding company

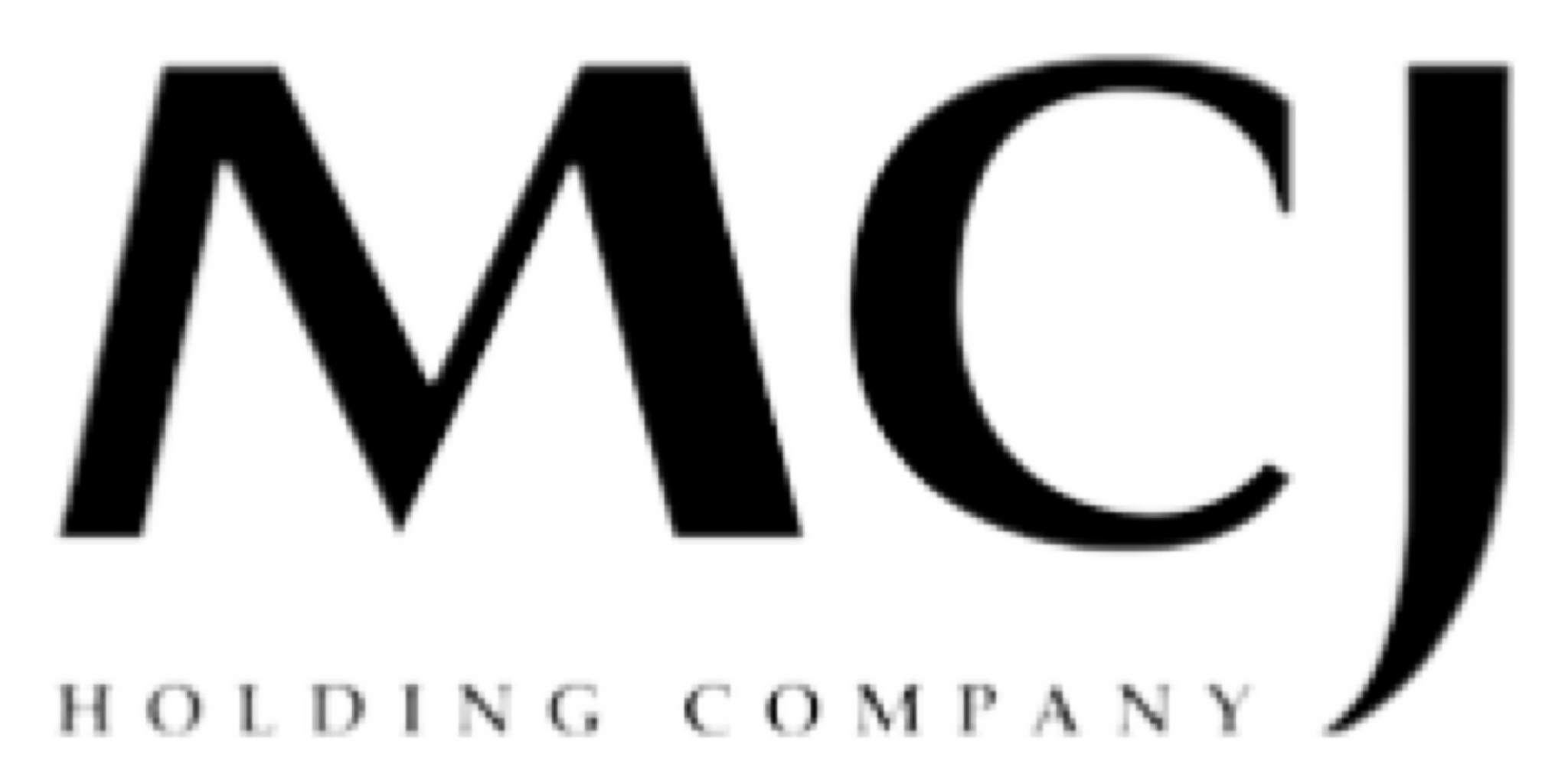
- Native name: 株式会社MCJ
- Romanized name: Kabushiki-gaisha MCJ
- Type: Holding company
- Industry: Electronics
- Founded: August 3, 1998; 27 years ago
- Headquarters: 3F Kanda TKM Building, 15 Kanda Ashiya, Chiyoda, Tokyo, Japan
- Area served: Worldwide
- Key people: Yuji Takashima (Chairman and CEO)
- Products: Electronics, Computer hardware, Information and communications technology
- Revenue: 124.5 billion yen in sales (March 2018)
- Total assets: 64.5 billion yen (March 31, 2018)
- Number of employees: 2,020 (March 31, 2018)
- Website: www.mcj.jp

MCJ Co., Ltd. (株式会社MCJ, Kabushiki-gaisha MCJ) is a Japanese company active in the personal computer, entertainment, information and communication industries.

MCJ itself is a holding company, responsible for the management of the group companies. MCJ Group companies include Mouse Computer Co., Ltd, UNIT.COM INC., Tekwind Co., Ltd, iiyama Benelux B.V., R-Logic International Pte Ltd and aprecio Corporation Ltd. R-Logic, which provides repair services for IT products, was converted into a subsidiary in January 2018 when MCJ acquired a 60 percent stake in the company.
