= Esports at the 2026 Asian Games =

- Venue: Aichi International Exhibition Center Hall D
- Dates: 22 September – 2 October 2026
- Competitors: 537 from 29 nations

Esports at the 2026 Asian Games were held at Aichi International Exhibition Center, from 22 September to 2 October 2026.

This was the second edition of the Asian Games that featured esports as a medal event, after first debuting as a demonstration event in 2018.

== Background ==
On 8 July 2023, the Olympic Council of Asia officially added esports to the 2026 Asian Games calendar with the Japan Esports Union and the Asian Electronic Sports Federation as co-organizers.

In November 2024, the OCA was planning to remove esports from the Asian Games with plans to create a separate competition for non-traditional sports including chess and card games.

On 6 February 2025, the OCA's executive board approved 11 video game titles for the esports tournament, and finalised on 22 February 2025 with an updated line-up, which included 13 video game titles in 11 events.

Additionally, Virtual Taekwondo (VTKD) a virtual reality fighting game based on conventional taekwondo will also feature in the Asian Games. Although VTKD is grouped with the taekwondo event rather than considered as esports for the purpose of the games calendar.

== Schedule ==
The schedule is as follows:

P	Preliminary rounds	E	Elimination stage	¼	Quarter-finals	½	Semifinals	F	Finals

Event↓/Date →	22; Tue	23; Wed			24; Thu		25; Fri		26; Sat			27th Sun			28th Mon		29; Tue		30; Wed			1 Thu	2 Fri
eFootball	P	¼	½	F	—N/a																		
Gran Turismo 7	P	½	F		—N/a																		
Honor of Kings	—N/a											P		¼	½	F	—N/a						
Naraka: Bladepoint	—N/a	P			½	F	—N/a																
Puyo Puyo Champions	—N/a				P				¼	½	F	—N/a											
Identity V	—N/a														P				¼	½	F	—N/a	
League of Legends	—N/a																P					½	F
Mobile Legends: Bang Bang	—N/a																P		¼		½	F	—N/a
Pokémon Unite	—N/a						P					¼	½	F	—N/a								
PUBG Mobile	—N/a														E		E	F	—N/a				
Competitive Martial Arts (Note: Covers three titles: Street Fighter 6, Tekken 8, The King of Fighters XV – This is a team competition with only one medal to be awarded.)	—N/a	P					¼	½	F			—N/a											

== Games ==
The following are the events and the corresponding game titles and platforms for the esports competition for the 2026 Asian Games.

Event / Game title		Platform	No. of players
eFootball		PC	2 (Team; one player per platform)
eFootball		Mobile	2 (Team; one player per platform)
Gran Turismo 7		PlayStation 5	1 (Single)
Honor of Kings		Mobile	5 (Team)
Naraka: Bladepoint		PC	Team
Puyo Puyo Champions		PC	1 (Single)
Identity V		Mobile	7 (Team)
League of Legends		PC	5 (Team)
Mobile Legends: Bang Bang		Mobile	5 (Team)
Pokémon Unite		Nintendo Switch	6 (Team)
PUBG Mobile		Mobile	5 (Team)
Fighting games	Street Fighter 6	PlayStation 5	3 (Team; one player per title)
Fighting games	Tekken 8	PlayStation 5	3 (Team; one player per title)
Fighting games	The King of Fighters XV	PlayStation 5	3 (Team; one player per title)

== Qualification ==
Qualification tournaments were held for six events covering six video game titles in Ho Chi Minh City, Kuala Lumpur, and Singapore.

Games	Date	Venue	Teams qualified
Identity V	30 May–1 June 2026	Singapore	China; Chinese Taipei; Hong Kong; Indonesia; Japan; Malaysia; Philippines; South Korea; Thailand; Vietnam
Naraka: Bladepoint	4–5 June 2026	Singapore	China; Chinese Taipei; Hong Kong; Indonesia; Malaysia; Philippines; Thailand; Vietnam
League of Legends	12–14 June 2026	(Malaysia) Kuala Lumpur	Chinese Taipei; Hong Kong; India; Malaysia; Saudi Arabia; South Korea; United Arab Emirates; Vietnam
Honor of Kings	13–21 June 2026	(Malaysia) Kuala Lumpur	China; Hong Kong; Indonesia; Kazakhstan; Laos; Malaysia; Myanmar; Nepal; Philippines; South Korea; Thailand; Vietnam
Mobile Legends: Bang Bang	18–21 June 2026	Singapore	Cambodia; Hong Kong; Indonesia; ~~Iran~~; Jordan; Kazakhstan; Malaysia; Mongolia; Myanmar; Philippines; Saudi Arabia; Uzbekistan
PUBG Mobile	19–21 June 2026	(Vietnam) Ho Chi Minh City	China; Chinese Taipei; Indonesia; Japan; Jordan; Kazakhstan; Myanmar; Nepal; Pakistan; South Korea; Thailand; Vietnam

== Medalists ==
Event	Gold	Silver	Bronze
eFootball	Iran; Hassan Pajani; Abolfazl Aghaeinasab	Malaysia; Farish Luzman; Muhd Hariz Hazmi Hakimin	Japan; Ekuya Kida; Yuga Chatani
eFootball	Iran; Hassan Pajani; Abolfazl Aghaeinasab	Malaysia; Farish Luzman; Muhd Hariz Hazmi Hakimin	Uzbekistan; Abubakir Iminjonov; Farrukh Mirkhamitov
Gran Turismo 7	Taj Izrin Aiman Taj Madira; Malaysia	Naif Al-Faleh; Saudi Arabia	Kim Young-chan; South Korea
Honor of Kings	China; Huang Yaoqin; Wang Ke; Xu Bicheng; Meng Jiajun; Zhao Hayu; He Weijia	Malaysia; Nicholas Ng; Chen Tat Yann; Lim Chee Hong; Chong Han Hui; Ryan Na; Lee Han Siang	Hong Kong; Kong Tsz Kin; Cheng Ka Hin; Kwok Ho Wa; Chui Sum Ki; Li Ka Hing; Deng Xin Zhan
Honor of Kings	China; Huang Yaoqin; Wang Ke; Xu Bicheng; Meng Jiajun; Zhao Hayu; He Weijia	Malaysia; Nicholas Ng; Chen Tat Yann; Lim Chee Hong; Chong Han Hui; Ryan Na; Lee Han Siang	Philippines; Dragon Dajao; Golden Dajao; Charles Esguerra; Chammy Nazarrea; Justine Tan; Jhon Tungol
Naraka: Bladepoint	China; Xu Kunbin; Sui Xiangyun; Wang Tongrong; Tan Xujie; Wang Feng	Thailand; Sahawat Phonngam; Nopparat Pidkwamlab; Kevin Lemoine; Wachirawut Changsoi; Jongrak Kampangkaew	Chinese Taipei; Liu Tang-shiun; Yan Kai-en; Chen Shang-yi; Yeh Chih-yu; Cheng Hsu-yu
Naraka: Bladepoint	China; Xu Kunbin; Sui Xiangyun; Wang Tongrong; Tan Xujie; Wang Feng	Thailand; Sahawat Phonngam; Nopparat Pidkwamlab; Kevin Lemoine; Wachirawut Changsoi; Jongrak Kampangkaew	Vietnam; Trần Công Tính; Lại Nguyễn Anh Khoa; Hồng Phát; Lại Nguyễn Anh Khoa; Diệp Chí Hiếu
Puyo Puyo Champions	Yuki Kurihara; Japan	Kang Dong-shin; South Korea	Tanarak Wongkitikun; Thailand
Puyo Puyo Champions	Yuki Kurihara; Japan	Kang Dong-shin; South Korea	Kuo Tzu-ang; Chinese Taipei
Identity V	China; Lu Yahui; Fan Siqi; Mu Xinyue; Chen Mingming; Shi Xiangwei; Sun Le; Lu Shujia	Japan; Ryo Kamiya; Yuto Awata; Masumi Konuma; Masahiro Uemura; Ryuhi Oyama; Kentaro Maeda; Masaki Uenaka	Malaysia; Gan Hong Ming; George Shan Yuan Chin; Yiau Wen Fang; Vincent Kai Liang Yii; Nicky Jung Hong Ho; Ng Wei Hao; Euggee Cheah
Identity V	China; Lu Yahui; Fan Siqi; Mu Xinyue; Chen Mingming; Shi Xiangwei; Sun Le; Lu Shujia	Japan; Ryo Kamiya; Yuto Awata; Masumi Konuma; Masahiro Uemura; Ryuhi Oyama; Kentaro Maeda; Masaki Uenaka	Chinese Taipei; Cheng Kai-sheng; Chen Kuang-yeh; Chu Tang-yao; Tang Sheng-chun; Chang Chun-ming; Chuang Po-chun; Su Bin-cheng
League of Legends	South Korea; Choi Woo-je; Lee Sang-hyeok; Kim Geon-woo; Ryu Min-seok; Kim Geon-bu; Lee Min-hyeong	Chinese Taipei; Lin Yu-en; Liu Jia-hao; Chiu Tzu-chuan; Yu Jun-jia; Tsai Ming-hung; Chen Yi-chin	Vietnam; Nguyễn Đăng Khoa; Trần Duy Sang; Đinh Anh Tài; Lê Văn Hoàng Hải; Trần Duy Đức; Hoàng Công Nghĩa
League of Legends	South Korea; Choi Woo-je; Lee Sang-hyeok; Kim Geon-woo; Ryu Min-seok; Kim Geon-bu; Lee Min-hyeong	Chinese Taipei; Lin Yu-en; Liu Jia-hao; Chiu Tzu-chuan; Yu Jun-jia; Tsai Ming-hung; Chen Yi-chin	Saudi Arabia; Khalid Al-Zahrani; Ajwad Wazzan; Nawaf Al-Juaid; Nawaf Al-Khowaiter; Sahal Waggass; Abdolaziz Al-Mubarak
Mobile Legends: Bang Bang	Myanmar; Han Htoo Swe; Hein Htet Oo; Kyaw Thuya; Myo Myint Ko Ko Kyaw; Shine Lin Aung	Indonesia; Syauki Fauzan Sumarno; Muhammad Affan Wahyudi; Dalvin Ramadhana Putra; Alexander Owen Marcetami Buhe; Albert Neilsen Iskandar; Arif Fudin Dingarai Putra	Malaysia; Muhammad Qayyum Ariffin; Muhammad Danial Mohamad Fuad; Muhammad Haqqullah; Hazziq Danish Mohamad Rizwan; Muhammad Danish Fitri Razman; Muhamad Razif Sazali
Mobile Legends: Bang Bang	Myanmar; Han Htoo Swe; Hein Htet Oo; Kyaw Thuya; Myo Myint Ko Ko Kyaw; Shine Lin Aung	Indonesia; Syauki Fauzan Sumarno; Muhammad Affan Wahyudi; Dalvin Ramadhana Putra; Alexander Owen Marcetami Buhe; Albert Neilsen Iskandar; Arif Fudin Dingarai Putra	Mongolia; Otgonbayar Lkhagvasuren; Tegshjargal Bagabandi; Erdenesuren Erdenebileg; Bayarsaikhan Tengis; Tumurbaatar Ermuunbaatar
PUBG Mobile	Thailand; Nuttawut Muensa; Sathit Thanormchit; Supachai Singkaew; Pawarit Wongthonghatsachai; Phumrapee Wannalertsakul	China; He Jianghong; He Ruibo; Chen Yumeng; Liu Jinshan; Li Haokui	Pakistan; Muhammad Huzaifa; Shayan Asad; Falak Shar Memon; Hasnain Rahman; Syed Sameer
Pokémon Unite	Japan; Hiroki Sato; Shouki Takada; Mashika Shirakawa; Koto Toba; Renta Higashi; Yudai Koseko	Indonesia; Deni Ardiyanto; Novrizal Diananta Said; Marcello Hillers; GM Judha Raja Panggabean; Muhammad Haikal Irawan	South Korea; Park Sung-soon; Cho Min-hyeok; Jin Su-been; Kim Jae-young; Lee Jih-wan
Pokémon Unite	Japan; Hiroki Sato; Shouki Takada; Mashika Shirakawa; Koto Toba; Renta Higashi; Yudai Koseko	Indonesia; Deni Ardiyanto; Novrizal Diananta Said; Marcello Hillers; GM Judha Raja Panggabean; Muhammad Haikal Irawan	Philippines; Lance David; Ducke Harnold Leoncio; Lawrence Anthony Gatmaitan; Kim Rey Salazar; Robert Jon Mempin; Michael Vaughn Ocio
Competitive Martial Arts	South Korea; Yeon Jea-gil; Bae Jae-min; Lee Kwang-noh	Japan; Kojiro Higuchi; Daichi Nakayama; Akihito Sawada	Saudi Arabia; Shaman Abdullah Alzaaqi; Badr Abdulaziz Alomair; Osama Mohammed Alhujili
Competitive Martial Arts	South Korea; Yeon Jea-gil; Bae Jae-min; Lee Kwang-noh	Japan; Kojiro Higuchi; Daichi Nakayama; Akihito Sawada	Hong Kong; Wong Yuk Cheung; Yeh Man Ho; Lin Hin Hei

== Medal table ==
* Host nation (Japan)

Rank	Nation	Gold	Silver	Bronze	Total
1	China	3	1	0	4
2	Japan*	2	2	1	5
3	South Korea	2	1	2	5
4	Malaysia	1	2	2	5
5	Thailand	1	1	1	3
6	Iran	1	0	0	1
6	Myanmar	1	0	0	1
8	Indonesia	0	2	0	2
9	Chinese Taipei	0	1	3	4
10	Saudi Arabia	0	1	2	3
11	Hong Kong	0	0	2	2
11	Philippines	0	0	2	2
11	Vietnam	0	0	2	2
14	Mongolia	0	0	1	1
14	Pakistan	0	0	1	1
14	Uzbekistan	0	0	1	1
Totals (16 entries)		11	11	20	42

== Participating nations ==
- Bahrain (6)
- Cambodia (6)
- China (23)
- Chinese Taipei (33)
- Hong Kong (43)
- Indonesia (34)
- India (15)
- Iran (3)
- Japan (25) (hosts)
- Jordan (15)
- Kazakhstan (25)
- Kyrgyzstan (3)
- Laos (5)
- Malaysia (44)
- Mongolia (9)
- Myanmar (17)
- Pakistan (8)
- Palestine (5)
- Philippines (30)
- Qatar (3)
- Saudi Arabia (18)
- Singapore (8)
- South Korea (36)
- Syria (3)
- Tajikistan (3)
- Thailand (29)
- United Arab Emirates (13)
- Uzbekistan (12)
- Vietnam (23)
