= Esports at the Asian Games =

- Governing bodies: AESF (Asia)
- Events: 11 (mixed)

Games
- 1951; 1954; 1958; 1962; 1966; 1970; 1974; 1978; 1982; 1986; 1990; 1994; 1998; 2002; 2006; 2010; 2014; 2018; 2022; 2026; Demonstration sport years indicated in italics
- Medalists

Esports has been one of the regular Asian Games sports since 2022 edition in Hangzhou, China. It was first introduced as a demonstration sport in 2018 in Jakarta and Palembang.

== History ==
Esports made its debut at the Asian Games alongside traditional sports in the 2018 edition in Jakarta and Palembang as demonstration event. The event featured six titles – games for mobile and PC. Esports became a medal event in the 2022 Asian Games held in Hangzhou, China in 2023 boosting the discipline's bid for recognition as a legitimate sport. The event for the postponed games, featured seven titles. Hearthstone was supposed to be the eight title but was scrapped due to license expiry issue.

The discipline is still set to be held in the 2026 Asian Games in Aichi and Nagoya, Japan.

== Editions ==
Games	Year	Host city	Best nation
XIX	2022	Hangzhou, China	China
XX	2026	Nagoya–Aichi, Japan	China

== Events ==
Event	18	22	26	Years
Individual
Clash Royale	d			0
EA Sports FC Online		X		1
eFootball	d (Note: Pro Evolution Soccer 2018 at the time)		X	1
Gran Turismo 7			X	1
Hearthstone	d			0
Naraka: Bladepoint			X	1
Puyo Puyo Champions			X	1
StarCraft II	d			0
Street Fighter V		X	(Note: Street Fighter 6 along with two other titles will be contested in the "Competitive Martial Arts" event)	1
Team
Arena of Valor; Honor of Kings (Note: Both games are recognised as different versions of the same game.)	d	X	X	2
Dota 2		X		1
Dream Three Kingdoms 2		X		1
Identity V			X	1
League of Legends	d	X	X	2
Mobile Legends: Bang Bang			X	1
Pokémon Unite			X	1
PUBG Mobile		X	X	2
Competitive Martial Arts			X (Note: Covers three titles: Street Fighter 6, Tekken 8, The King of Fighters XV. Only one medal will be awarded.)	1
Total	0	7	11	18

== Medal table ==
As of 2026 edition

Rank	Nation	Gold	Silver	Bronze	Total
1	China (CHN)	7	1	1	9
2	South Korea (KOR)	4	2	3	9
3	Thailand (THA)	2	2	3	7
4	Japan (JPN)	2	2	1	5
5	Malaysia (MAS)	1	3	3	7
6	Iran (IRI)	1	0	0	1
6	Myanmar (MYA)	1	0	0	1
8	Chinese Taipei (TPE)	0	3	5	8
9	Indonesia (INA)	0	2	0	2
10	Hong Kong (HKG)	0	1	2	3
10	Saudi Arabia (KSA)	0	1	2	3
12	Mongolia (MGL)	0	1	1	2
13	Philippines (PHI)	0	0	2	2
13	Vietnam (VIE)	0	0	2	2
15	Pakistan (PAK)	0	0	1	1
15	Uzbekistan (UZB)	0	0	1	1
Totals (16 entries)		18	18	27	63

== Participating nations ==
Nation	18	22	Years
Bahrain		4	1
China	13	31	2
Chinese Taipei	13	19	2
Hong Kong	9	31	2
India	9	15	2
Indonesia	17	13	2
Iran	3		1
Japan	3	12	2
Jordan		7	1
Kazakhstan	9	28	2
Kuwait		1	1
Kyrgyzstan	1	15	2
Laos	6	15	2
Macau		19	1
Malaysia	2	19	2
Maldives		13	1
Mongolia		10	1
Myanmar		16	1
Nepal		22	1
Pakistan	6		1
Palestine		12	1
Philippines		25	1
Qatar		4	1
Saudi Arabia	7	21	2
Singapore		1	1
South Korea	7	15	2
Sri Lanka	1	4	2
Tajikistan		12	1
Thailand	7	32	2
United Arab Emirates		10	1
Uzbekistan	1	23	2
Vietnam	17	26	2
Number of nations	18	30	
Number of athletes	131	475	
