= Cycling at the 2026 Asian Games – Women's keirin =

Women's keirin at the 2026 Asian Games
- Venue: Izu Velodrome
- Dates: 30 September 2026
- Competitors: 15 from 8 nations

Medalists
gold medal	Yuan Liying	China
silver medal	Wang Lijuan	China
bronze medal	Nurul Izzah Izzati Mohd Asri	Malaysia

The women's keirin event at the 2026 Asian Games was held on 30 September 2026.

== Schedule ==
All times are Japan Standard Time (UTC+09:00)

Date	Time	Event
Wednesday, 30 September 2026	10:25	First round
Wednesday, 30 September 2026	11:04	Repechage
Wednesday, 30 September 2026	15:00	Semifinals
Wednesday, 30 September 2026	16:02	Finals

== Results ==
Legend

- DNF — Did not finish

=== First round ===
==== Heat 1 ====
Rank	Athlete	Gap
1	Yuan Liying (CHN)	
2	Haruka Nakazawa (JPN)	+0.093
3	Cho Sun-young (KOR)	+0.229
4	Liu Shang-ying (TPE)	+0.374
	Samah Khaled (JOR)	DSQ

==== Heat 2 ====
Rank	Athlete	Gap
1	Nurul Izzah Izzati Mohd Asri (MAS)	
2	Yeung Cho Yiu (HKG)	+0.018
3	Chen Ching-yun (TPE)	+0.378
4	Minami Yamada (JPN)	+0.412
5	Sarita Kumari (IND)	+1.332

==== Heat 3 ====
Rank	Athlete	Gap
1	Wang Lijuan (CHN)	
2	Nur Alyssa Mohd Farid (MAS)	+0.128
3	Ng Sze Wing (HKG)	+0.673
4	Keerthi Chikka (IND)	+0.811
5	Kim Hae-un (KOR)	+1.006

=== Repechages ===
==== Heat 1 ====
Rank	Athlete	Gap
1	Cho Sun-young (KOR)	
2	Minami Yamada (JPN)	+0.483
3	Keerthi Chikka (IND)	+0.576
4	Sarita Kumari (IND)	+0.834

==== Heat 2 ====
Rank	Athlete	Gap
1	Ng Sze Wing (HKG)	
2	Kim Hae-un (KOR)	+0.023
3	Chen Ching-yun (TPE)	+0.049
4	Liu Shang-ying (TPE)	+0.055

=== Semifinals ===
==== Heat 1 ====
Rank	Athlete	Gap
1	Nur Alyssa Mohd Farid (MAS)	
2	Yuan Liying (CHN)	+0.220
3	Chen Ching-yun (TPE)	+0.408
4	Minami Yamada (JPN)	+0.487
	Yeung Cho Yiu (HKG)	DNF
	Ng Sze Wing (HKG)	DNF

==== Heat 2 ====
Rank	Athlete	Gap
1	Wang Lijuan (CHN)	
2	Nurul Izzah Izzati Mohd Asri (MAS)	+0.467
3	Haruka Nakazawa (JPN)	+0.478
4	Kim Hae-un (KOR)	+0.529
5	Keerthi Chikka (IND)	+1.450
6	Cho Sun-young (KOR)	+1.524

=== Finals ===
==== Final 7–12 ====
Rank	Athlete	Gap
1	Yeung Cho Yiu (HKG)	
2	Kim Hae-un (KOR)	+0.183
3	Ng Sze Wing (HKG)	+0.229
4	Keerthi Chikka (IND)	+0.293
5	Minami Yamada (JPN)	+0.336
6	Cho Sun-young (KOR)	+0.444

==== Final ====
Rank	Athlete	Gap
1st place, gold medalist(s)	Yuan Liying (CHN)	
2nd place, silver medalist(s)	Wang Lijuan (CHN)	+0.041
3	Nurul Izzah Izzati Mohd Asri (MAS)	+0.081
4	Haruka Nakazawa (JPN)	+0.286
5	Nur Alyssa Mohd Farid (MAS)	+0.625
6	Chen Ching-yun (TPE)	+0.999
