= Swimming at the 2026 Asian Games – Men's 200 metre butterfly =

Men's 200 metre butterfly at the 2026 Asian Games
- Venue: Tokyo Aquatics Centre
- Date: 25 September 2026
- Competitors: 26 from 18 nations

Medalists
gold medal	Wang Kuan-hung	Chinese Taipei
silver medal	Xu Fang	China
bronze medal	Kim Min-seop	South Korea

The men's 200 metre butterfly event at the 2026 Asian Games took place on 25 September 2026 at the Tokyo Aquatics Centre.

== Schedule ==
All times are Japan Standard Time (UTC+09:00)

Date	Time	Event
Friday, 25 September 2026	11:20	Heats
Friday, 25 September 2026	18:21	Final

== Records ==
Prior to this competition, the existing world, Asian and Games records were as follows.

World Record	Kristóf Milák (HUN)	1:50.34	Budapest, Hungary	21 June 2022
Asian Record	Daiya Seto (JPN)	1:52.53	Beijing, China	18 January 2020
Games Record	Tomoru Honda (JPN)	1:53.15	Hangzhou, China	29 September 2023

== Results ==
=== Heats ===
Rank	Heat	Athlete	Time	Notes
1	2	Wang Xizhe (CHN)	1:59.28	Q
2	3	Wang Kuan-hung (TPE)	1:59.40	Q
3	3	Tomoyuki Matsushita (JPN)	1:59.87	Q
4	2	Kim Min-seop (KOR)	2:00.27	Q
5	1	Park Jung-hun (KOR)	2:00.72	Q
6	3	Sajan Prakash (IND)	2:00.94	Q
7	1	Xu Fang (CHN)	2:01.03	Q
8	2	Surasit Thongdeang (THA)	2:01.05	Q
9	2	Dương Văn Hoàng Quý (VIE)	2:01.83	Q
10	3	Ho Chung Lun (HKG)	2:01.84	Q
11	1	Brandon Yap Yan Xi (SGP)	2:02.03	Reserve
12	3	Wongsakorn Patsamarn (THA)	2:02.32	Reserve
13	1	Emile Fouzai (QAT)	2:02.83	
14	3	Nguyễn Quang Thuận (VIE)	2:03.30	
15	2	Azman Ardi (SGP)	2:03.40	
16	1	Maxim Skazobtsov (KAZ)	2:03.41	
17	3	Tan Khai Xin (MAS)	2:04.94	
18	2	Soud Alenzi (KUW)	2:05.38	
19	1	Mohammad Alotaibi (KUW)	2:06.74	
20	1	Goh Li Jie (MAS)	2:10.19	
21	2	Mohamed Ismail (QAT)	2:11.15	
22	1	Belgudei Uyanga (MGL)	2:14.87	
23	2	Lau Kin Hei James (HKG)	2:18.78	
24	3	Munguntulga Ariunbold (MGL)	2:47.28	
	3	Mohammed Al Zaki (KSA)	DNS	
	2	Munzer Mark Kabbara (LBN)	DNS	

=== Final ===
Rank	Athlete	Time	Notes
1st place, gold medalist(s)	Wang Kuan-hung (TPE)	1:55.05	
2nd place, silver medalist(s)	Xu Fang (CHN)	1:55.65	
3rd place, bronze medalist(s)	Kim Min-seop (KOR)	1:55.94	
4	Wang Xizhe (CHN)	1:55.95	
5	Park Jung-hun (KOR)	1:56.87	
6	Tomoyuki Matsushita (JPN)	1:57.35	
7	Sajan Prakash (IND)	1:58.42	
8	Dương Văn Hoàng Quý (VIE)	1:59.15	
9	Surasit Thongdeang (THA)	2:01.24	
10	Ho Chung Lun (HKG)	2:02.15	
