= Sailing at the 2026 Asian Games – Men's ILCA 7 =

Men's ILCA 7 at the 2026 Asian Games
- Venue: Kaiyoh Yacht Harbor
- Date: 28 September – 2 October 2026
- Competitors: 18 from 18 nations

Medalists
gold medal	Ha Jee-min	South Korea
silver medal	Nicholas Halliday	Hong Kong
bronze medal	Khairulnizam Mohd Afendy	Malaysia

The men's ILCA 7 competition at the 2026 Asian Games was held from 28 September – 2 October 2026 at Kaiyoh Yacht Harbor in Gamagōri, Aichi, Japan.

The competition consisted of a nine-race qualification series followed by a two-race final for the top ten sailors.

Ha Jee-min won the gold medal, Nicholas Halliday took silver and Khairulnizam Mohd Afendy bronze.

== Schedule ==
All times are Japan Standard Time (UTC+09:00).

Date	Time	Event
Monday, 28 September 2026	11:00	Race 1–2
Wednesday, 30 September 2026	11:00	Race 3–5
Thursday, 1 October 2026	10:00	Race 6–9
Friday, 2 October 2026	11:00	Final

== Results ==
Legend

- DSQ — Disqualification
- DNE — Non-excludable disqualification
- DNF — Did not finish
- RET — Retired
- UFD — U flag disqualification

Rank	Athlete	Qualification series									Rec.	Final		Total	Net
Rank	Athlete	1	2	3	4	5	6	7	8	9	Rec.	F1	F2	Total	Net
1st place, gold medalist(s)	Ha Jee-min (KOR)	~~(19)~~; DSQ	5	5	1	1	4	4	3	1	0	3	6	9	9
2nd place, silver medalist(s)	Nicholas Halliday (HKG)	5	3	2	~~(7)~~	7	3	2	7	2	7	1	3	11	11
3rd place, bronze medalist(s)	Khairulnizam Mohd Afendy (MAS)	2	6	3	4	~~(9)~~	5	5	1	4	6	7	1	14	14
4	Vishnu Saravanan (IND)	8	9	1	3	6	7	1	6	~~(19)~~; RET	17	2	2	21	21
5	Ryan Lo (SGP)	3	7	7	8	3	~~(19)~~; UFD	3	2	3	12	6	7	25	25
6	Chusitt Punjamala (THA)	4	1	9	2	4	1	8	8	~~(12)~~	13	4	9	26	26
7	Haruto Kuroda (JPN)	~~(7)~~	4	4	5	5	6	6	5	5	16	8	8	32	32
8	Luo Junsuo (CHN)	1	2	~~(10)~~	10	8	2	19; DNE	4	7	25	5	4	34	34
9	Wu Tsai-chien (TPE)	6	8	6	9	~~(19)~~; RET	8	7	9	13	25	9	5	39	39
10	Muzammil Hassan (PAK)	12	~~(16)~~	8	13	2	13	9	12	8	25	10	10	45	45
11	Ilia Ignatev (KGZ)	11	10	11	6	~~(14)~~	9	10	11	11				93	79
12	Sultan Al-Owais (UAE)	9	11	~~(15)~~	15	10	10	12	10	6				98	83
13	Nhov Chan (CAM)	10	15	12	12	~~(19)~~; DSQ	11	15	13	9				116	97
14	Vladimir Chshankin (KAZ)	13	12	~~(19)~~; DSQ	14	11	12	11	14	16				122	103
15	Shahab Khatam (IRI)	~~(19)~~; DNF	14	14	11	13	14	13	16	15				129	110
16	Thach Phat (VIE)	15	13	16	~~(17)~~	15	17	16	15	10				134	117
17	Anton Tereshchenko (UZB)	16	~~(17)~~	13	16	12	15	14	17	14				134	117
18	Udara Deshabakthi Rajapaksha (SRI)	14	18	17	18	16	16	17	18	~~(19)~~; DNS				153	134
