= Karate at the 2026 Asian Games – Men's kumite 55 kg =

Men's kumite 55 kg at the 2026 Asian Games
- Venue: Toyohashi City General Gymnasium
- Date: 20 September 2026
- Competitors: 8 from 8 nations

Medalists
gold medal	Zholaman Bigabyl	Kazakhstan
silver medal	Khumoyunmirzo Khalimov	Uzbekistan
bronze medal	Thevendran Kaliana Sundram	Malaysia
bronze medal	Makhsatullo Muminov	Tajikistan

The men's kumite 55 kilograms competition at the 2026 Asian Games took place on 20 September 2026 at Toyohashi City General Gymnasium, Toyohashi. Kazakhstan's Zholaman Bigabyl won the gold medal, defeating Uzbekistan's Khumoyunmirzo Khalimov (9–1) in the final to win his first Asian Games medal.

Mohamad Moner Rezayee from Afghanistan was also on the start list but was disqualified during the official weight control due to being overweight and his name has been removed from the draw.

== Schedule ==
All times are Japan Standard Time (UTC+09:00)

Date	Time	Event
Sunday, 20 September 2026	12:50	Quarterfinals
Sunday, 20 September 2026	12:50	Semifinals
Sunday, 20 September 2026	12:50	Bronze medal bouts
Sunday, 20 September 2026	16:30	Final

== Results ==
Legend

- K — Won by kiken

=== Main bracket ===
Quarterfinals		Semifinals		Final
Thevendran Kaliana Sundram (MAS)	0
Khumoyunmirzo Khalimov (UZB)	3	Khumoyunmirzo Khalimov (UZB)	7
Rakesh Manandhar (NEP)	9	Rakesh Manandhar (NEP)	0
Natthakrit Ingloy (THA)	0			Khumoyunmirzo Khalimov (UZB)	1
Zholaman Bigabyl (KAZ)	7			Zholaman Bigabyl (KAZ)	9
Makhsatullo Muminov (TJK)	0	Zholaman Bigabyl (KAZ)	6
Muhammad Tegar Januar (INA)	2^{K}	Muhammad Tegar Januar (INA)	1
Ahmad Munib Aiman Hasimudin (BRU)	1

=== Repechage ===
Bronze medal bouts
Thevendran Kaliana Sundram (MAS)	9
Rakesh Manandhar (NEP)	1
Makhsatullo Muminov (TJK)	8
Muhammad Tegar Januar (INA)	0
