= Malaysia at the 2026 Asian Games =

- IOC code: MAS
- NOC: Olympic Council of Malaysia
- Website: olympics.com.my (in English)

in Aichi Prefecture and Nagoya, Japan 19 September – 4 October 2026
- Competitors: 352 in 30 sports
- Flag bearers: Muhd Azeem Fahmi; Tan Cheong Min
- Officials: 185
- Medals Ranked 11th: Gold 9 Silver 7 Bronze 16 Total 32

Asian Games appearances (overview)
- 1954; 1958; 1962; 1966; 1970; 1974; 1978; 1982; 1986; 1990; 1994; 1998; 2002; 2006; 2010; 2014; 2018; 2022; 2026

Other related appearances
- North Borneo (1954, 1958, 1962); Sarawak (1962)

Malaysia competed at the 2026 Asian Games in Aichi Prefecture and Nagoya, Japan, from 19 September to 4 October 2026. The Malaysian contingent comprised 352 athletes (203 men and 149 women) and 185 officials, and entered 156 events across 30 sports.

== Background ==
=== Preparation ===
The Olympic Council of Malaysia appointed the president of the Sepaktakraw Association of Malaysia, Datuk Sumali Reduan, as the chef de mission for the delegation, alongside appointments for the 2026 Commonwealth Games, 2026 Asian Beach Games, 2026 Youth Olympic Games, and 2027 SEA Games.

On 13 June 2026, the OCM appointed former squash player Mohd Azlan Iskandar and former tenpin bowler Syaidatul Afifah Badrul Hamidi as deputy chefs de mission to provide inspiration and motivation to strive for excellence and uphold the spirit of sportsmanship.

An initial July 2026 entry list comprised 347 athletes and 176 officials. By the flag-handover ceremony on 8 September, the final Malaysian delegation had increased to 537 members, comprising 352 athletes and 185 officials. Malaysia entered 156 of the 469 events in 30 sports and set a medal target of six gold, seven silver and 20 bronze medals, or 33 medals overall.

== Medal summary ==
Malaysia won 32 medals—nine gold, seven silver and 16 bronze. The nine gold medals equalled Malaysia's previous best Asian Games gold-medal haul, achieved at the 2010 Asian Games in Guangzhou. The contingent exceeded its six-gold target but finished one medal short of its overall target of 33 medals.

=== Medal by sport ===
Medals by sport
Sport	1st place, gold medalist(s)	2nd place, silver medalist(s)	3rd place, bronze medalist(s)	Total
Squash	4	0	1	5
Karate	2	0	3	5
Esports	1	2	2	5
Cycling – Track	1	1	2	4
Sepak takraw	1	1	0	2
Diving	0	1	2	3
Padel	0	1	0	1
Field hockey	0	1	0	1
Sailing	0	0	3	3
Wushu	0	0	2	2
Badminton	0	0	1	1
Total	9	7	16	32

=== Medal by date ===
Medals by date
Day	Date	1st place, gold medalist(s)	2nd place, silver medalist(s)	3rd place, bronze medalist(s)	Total
1	20 September	0	0	2	2
2	21 September	0	0	0	0
3	22 September	1	0	1	2
4	23 September	2	1	2	5
5	24 September	0	0	0	0
6	25 September	1	0	0	1
7	26 September	0	0	2	2
8	27 September	2	1	1	4
9	28 September	0	1	1	2
10	29 September	0	2	0	2
11	30 September	0	0	3	3
12	1 October	0	0	1	1
13	2 October	3	0	3	6
14	3 October	0	2	0	2
15	4 October	0	0	0	0
Total		9	7	16	32

=== Medallists ===
No.	Medal	Name	Sport	Event	Date
1	Gold	Adeola Fay Robert	Karate – Kumite	Women's –55kg	22 September
2	Gold	Taj Izrin Aiman Taj Madira	Esports	Gran Turismo 7	23 September
3	Gold	Shahmalarani Chandran	Karate – Kumite	Women's –50kg	23 September
4	Gold	Mohammad Syahir Mohd Rosdi; Muhammad Haziq Hairul Nizam; Muhammad Zulkifli Abd Razak; Muhammad Zarif Marican; Muhammad Hafizul Hayazi; Farhan Adam; Amirul Zazwan Amir; Mohamad Azlan Alias; Zuleffendi Sumari; Muhammad Afifuddin Mohd Razali; Muhammad Shahalril Aiman; Muhammad Noraizat Mohd Nordin; Aidil Azman Azwawi	Sepak takraw	Men's Team Regu	25 September
5	Gold	Ng Eain Yow	Squash	Men's Singles	27 September
6	Gold	Sivasangari Subramaniam	Squash	Women's Singles	27 September
7	Gold	Aifa Azman; Aira Azman; Rachel Arnold; Sivasangari Subramaniam	Squash	Women's Team	2 October
8	Gold	Azizulhasni Awang	Cycling – Track	Men's Keirin	2 October
9	Gold	Ameeshenraj Chandaran; Mohd Syafiq Kamal; Sanjay Jeeva; Ng Eain Yow	Squash	Men's Team	2 October
1	Silver	Farish Luzman; Hariz Hazmi Hakimin	Esports	eFootball	23 September
2	Silver	Elvis Priestly Clement; Enrique Maccartney Harold	Diving	Men's Synchronized 10 m Platform	27 September
3	Silver	Nicholas Ng Khai Shuan; Chen Tat Yann; Lim Chee Hong; Chong Han Hui; Ryan Na Jie Rong; Lee Han Siang	Esports	Honor of Kings	28 September
4	Silver	Mohammad Syahir Mohd Rosdi; Muhammad Zulkifli Abd Razak; Mohamad Azlan Alias; Muhammad Afifuddin Mohd Razali; Aidil Azman Azwawi	Sepak takraw	Men's Regu	29 September
5	Silver	Nurul Izzah Izzati; Nurul Aliana Syafika; Nur Alyssa Farid; Anis Amira Rosidi	Cycling – Track	Women's Team Sprint	29 September
6	Silver	Christian Didier Chin; Aidan Khairuddin Yunus	Padel	Men's Pairs	3 October
7	Silver	Malaysia men's national field hockey team: Marhan Jalil Fitri Saari; Faizal Saari Akhimullah Anuar Shello Silverius Zaimi Mat Deris Faiz Jali Ashran Hamsani Hafizuddin Othman Norsyafiq Sumantri Abu Kamal Azrai Aiman Rozemi Muhajir Abdu Rauf Shafiq Hassan Amirul Azahar Faris Harizan Azimuddin Kamaruddin Aminuddin Mohd Zain Andywalfian Jeffrynus Nur Aqilrullah Che	Field hockey	Men's Tournament	3 October
1	Bronze	Thevendran Kaliana Sundram	Karate – Kumite	Men's –55kg	20 September
2	Bronze	Sureeya Sankar Hari Sankar	Karate – Kumite	Men's –60kg	20 September
3	Bronze	Tan Cheong Min	Wushu – Taolu	Women's Nanquan & Nandao	22 September
4	Bronze	Muhammad Aiqal Asmadie; Mohamad Haznil Henry; Mukhriz Mazlan	Karate – Kata	Men's Team Kata	23 September
5	Bronze	Clement Ting	Wushu – Taolu	Men's Daoshu & Gunshu	23 September
6	Bronze	Ameeshenraj Chandaran; Rachel Arnold	Squash	Mixed Doubles	26 September
7	Bronze	Yong Rui Jie; Mohamad Nurqayyum	Diving	Men's Synchronized 3 m Springboard	26 September
8	Bronze	Ong Ker Ying; Lee Yiat Qing	Diving	Women's Synchronized 3 m Springboard	27 September
9	Bronze	Pearly Tan; Thinaah Muralitharan	Badminton	Women's Doubles	28 September
10	Bronze	Nurul Izzah Izzati	Cycling – Track	Women's Keirin	30 September
11	Bronze	Gan Hong Ming; George Chin Shan Yuan; Yiau Wen Feng; Vincent Yii Kai Liang; Nicky Ho Jun Hong; Ng Wei Hao; Cheah Euggee	Esports	Identity V	30 September
12	Bronze	Muhammad Qayyum Ariffin; Muhammad Danial Fuad; Muhammad Haqqullah; Hazziq Danish Rizwan; Danish Fitri Razman; Muhamad Razif Sazali	Esports	Mobile Legends: Bang Bang	30 September
13	Bronze	Azizulhasni Awang	Cycling – Track	Men's Sprint	1 October
14	Bronze	Khairulnizam Afendy	Sailing	Men's ILCA 7	2 October
15	Bronze	Muhammad Adam Aierell; Iqbal Nazham Musmuliadi	Sailing	Men's 29er	2 October
16	Bronze	Aina Zulaikha Azizul Rahman; Nor Izniey Humaira Azri	Sailing	Women's 29er	2 October

=== Multiple medallists ===
Name	Medal	Sport	Event
Sivasangari Subramaniam	Gold; Gold	Squash	Women's Singles; Women's Team
Ng Eain Yow	Gold; Gold	Squash	Men's Singles; Men's Team
Mohammad Syahir Mohd Rosdi; Muhammad Zulkifli Abd Razak; Mohamad Azlan Alias; Muhammad Afifuddin Mohd Razali; Aidil Azman Azwawi	Gold; Silver	Sepak takraw	Men's Team Regu; Men's Regu
Azizulhasni Awang	Gold; Bronze	Cycling – Track	Men's Keirin; Men's Sprint
Rachel Arnold	Gold; Bronze	Squash	Women's Team; Mixed Doubles
Ameeshenraj Chandaran	Gold; Bronze	Squash	Men's Team; Mixed Doubles
Nurul Izzah Izzati	Silver; Bronze	Cycling – Track	Women's Team Sprint; Women's Keirin

== Competitors ==
The following is a list of Malaysian entries by sport or discipline. The official delegation comprised 352 unique athletes—203 men and 149 women. Because athletes may be entered in more than one discipline, sport-by-sport entry counts should not be interpreted as a count of unique athletes.

Sport	Men	Women	Total
3x3 basketball	4	4	8
Archery	6	6	12
Athletics	12	8	20
Badminton	10	10	20
Basketball	0	12	12
Beach volleyball	0	2	2
Cricket	15	15	30
Cycling	6	5	11
Diving	6	4	10
Equestrian	1	1	2
Esports	44	0	44
Field hockey	20	20	40
Gymnastics	1	10	11
Judo	1	0	1
Ju-jitsu	1	0	1
Kabaddi	12	0	12
Karate	5	3	8
Modern pentathlon	1	1	2
Padel	2	2	4
Rowing	0	1	1
Rugby sevens	13	13	26
Sailing	6	6	12
Sepak takraw	12	9	21
Shooting	2	5	7
Sport climbing	1	1	2
Squash	4	4	8
Surfing	1	1	2
Swimming	9	0	9
Table tennis	2	0	2
Taekwondo	2	2	4
Weightlifting	2	0	2
Wushu	2	5	7
Total unique athletes	203	149	352

== Archery ==
Twelve archers represented Malaysia, comprising six men and six women competing across the compound and recurve categories.

Compound

Athlete	Event	Ranking round		Round of 64	Round of 32	Round of 16	Quarter-finals	Semi-finals	Final / BM	
Athlete	Event	Score	Rank	Opposition Score	Opposition Score	Opposition Score	Opposition Score	Opposition Score	Opposition Score	Rank
Mohd Juwaidi Mazuki	Men's individual	706	9 Q	—N/a	Komoto (JPN); W 149–145	Kim (KOR); L 145–147	Did not advance			
Aiman Syafiq Tariki	Men's individual	698	28	Did not advance						
Alang Ariff Aqil Ghazalli	Men's individual	703	14 Q	—N/a	Nguyen (VIE); W 148–147	Choi (KOR); L 145–149	Did not advance			
Mohd Juwaidi Mazuki; Aiman Syafiq Tariki; Alang Ariff Aqil Ghazalli	Men's team	2107	6 Q	—N/a		Bhutan; L 228–229	Did not advance			
Aina Syazwana Abdul Muhaimin	Women's individual	683	35	Did not advance						
Fatin Nurfatehah Mat Salleh	Women's individual	700	11 Q	—N/a	Alawadhi (UAE); W 144–143	Kaewchomphu (THA); W 147–146	Park (KOR); L 139–145	Did not advance		
Iman Aisyah Norazam	Women's individual	693	19 Q	—N/a	Chen F-y (TPE); L 145–145 (SO 9–10)	Did not advance				
Aina Syazwana Abdul Muhaimin; Fatin Nufatehah Mat Salleh; Iman Aisyah Norazam	Women's team	2076	8 Q	—N/a		Vietnam; L 227–229	Did not advance			
Mohd Juwaidi Mazuki; Fatin Nufatehah Mat Salleh	Mixed team	1406	7 Q	—N/a		Indonesia; L 156–156 (SO 18–19)	Did not advance			

Recurve

Athlete	Event	Ranking round		Round of 64	Round of 32	Round of 16	Quarter-finals	Semi-finals	Final / BM	
Athlete	Event	Score	Rank	Opposition Score	Opposition Score	Opposition Score	Opposition Score	Opposition Score	Opposition Score	Rank
Evan Rich Chong Qi Wei	Men's individual	672	19 Q	—N/a	Nguyen (VIE); W 6–5	Tang C-c (TPE); L 2–6	Did not advance			
Quik Chern Xin	Men's individual	649	31 Q	Mashev (KGZ); W 6–2	Kim (KOR); L 0–6	Did not advance				
Muhammad Haiqal Danish	Men's individual	646	43	Did not advance						
Evan Rich Chong Qi Wei; Quik Chern Xin; Muhammad Haiqal Danish	Men's team	1967	13 Q	—N/a		Chinese Taipei (TPE); L 1–5	Did not advance			
Joey Tan Xing Lei	Women's individual	619	28 Q	Tynalieva (KGZ); W 6–0	Li (TPE); L 3–7	Did not advance				
Ariana Nur Dania Zairi	Women's individual	643	20 Q	—N/a	Choirunisa (INA); L 0–6	Did not advance				
Ku Nurin Afiqah	Women's individual	606	44	Did not advance						
Joey Tan Xing Lei; Ariana Nur Dania Zairi; Ku Nurin Afiqah	Women's team	1868	12 Q	—N/a		Indonesia (INA); L 2-6	Did not advance			
Quik Chern Xin; Joey Tan Xing Lei	Mixed team	1315	13 Q	—N/a	Timor-Leste; W DNS	Chinese Taipei (TPE); L 4–5	Did not advance			

== Athletics ==
Twenty athletes, comprising 12 men and eight women, represented Malaysia at the Games.

=== Men ===
Track

Athlete	Event	Qualification		Semi-final		Final	
Athlete	Event	Time	Rank	Time	Rank	Time	Rank
Muhd Azeem Fahmi	100 metres	10.17	3 Q	10.25	8 Q	14.65	8
Muhammad Umaira Subri	100 metres	10.43	19 q	10.39 PB	19	Did not advance	
Danish Iftikhar Roslee	200 metres	21.04 SB	6 Q	20.76 SB	6 q	20.89 SB	6
Muhammad Haziq Akhir	200 metres	21.44	20 q	21.50	20	Did not advance	
Umar Osman	400 metres	46.91	17	Did not advance			
Wan Muhammad Fazri	800 metres	1:53.63	5	Did not advance			
Umar Osman	800 metres	1:48.74 PB	4	Did not advance			
Armin Zahryl Abd Latif	110 m hurdles	13.91	13	Did not advance			
Muhd Azeem Fahmi; Danish Iftikhar Roslee; Muhammad Umaira Subri; Muhammad Haziq Akhir; Pengiran Aidil Auf Hajam; Armin Zahryl Abd Latif	4 x 100 metres relay	39.99	5	Did not advance			

Field

Athlete	Event	Qualification		Final	
Athlete	Event	Score	Rank	Final	
Andre Anura	Long jump	6.59	15	Did not advance	
Jonah Chang Rigan	Shot put	—N/a		18.89	7
Irfan Shamsuddin	Discus throw	—N/a		56.37	10
Sadat Marzuqi Ajisan	Hammer throw	—N/a		62.58	14

=== Women ===
Track

Athlete	Event	Qualification		Semi-final		Final	
Athlete	Event	Time	Rank	Time	Rank	Time	Rank
Shereen Samson Vallabouy	400 metres	54.03	10	Did not advance			
Nor Aishah Rofina Aling; Shereen Samson Vallabouy; Izzatul Musfirah Kamal Azira; Nurul Wardatul Huwaida Hamka; Azreen Nabila Alias; Fatin Ilyana Mat Nayan	4 x 100 metres relay	45.24 SB	5	Did not advance			

Field

Athlete	Event	Final	
Athlete	Event	Score	Rank
Nani Sahirah Maryata	Shot put	15.07	8
Grace Wong Xiu Mei	Hammer throw	64.15	7

=== Mixed ===
Track

Athlete	Event	Qualification		Semi-final		Final	
Athlete	Event	Time	Rank	Time	Rank	Time	Rank
Muhd Azeem Fahmi; Danish Iftikhar Roslee; Pengiran Aidil Auf Hajam; Nor Aishah Rofina Aling; Shereen Samson Vallabouy; Izzatul Musfirah Kamal Azira	4 x 100 metres relay	42.64	6	Did not advance			

== Badminton ==
On 21 July 2026, the Badminton Association of Malaysia announced the 20 players who would be competing.

Men

Athlete	Event	Round of 64	Round of 32	Round of 16	Quarter-finals	Semi-finals	Final	
Athlete	Event	Opposition Score	Opposition Score	Opposition Score	Opposition Score	Opposition Score	Opposition Score	Rank
Leong Jun Hao	Singles	Bye	B Munkhbat (MGL); W 21–11, 21–14	A Farhan (INA); L 16–21, 11–21	Did not advance			
Justin Hoh	Singles	P Teeraratsakul (THA); W WDN	G Singha (BAN); W 21-8, 21-7	Loh K Y (SGP); L 14–21, 14–21	Did not advance			
Goh Sze Fei; Nur Izzuddin	Doubles	—N/a	Chiu H-c / Wang C-l (TPE); W 21-17, 21-14	T Hoki / Y Kobayashi (JPN); W 21–19, 21–16	Liang W K / Wang C (CHN); L 13–21, 17–21	Did not advance		
Aaron Chia; Tee Kai Wun	Doubles	—N/a	Abdurakhimov O/ Saidov D (TJK); W 21–6, 21–6	Kim W-h / Seo S-j (KOR); L 19–21, 16–21	Did not advance			
Leong Jun Hao; Justin Hoh; Goh Sze Fei; Nur Izzuddin; Aaron Chia; Tee Kai Wun; Eogene Ewe; Kong Wei Xiang; Goh Soon Huat; Chen Tang Jie	Team	—N/a		Mongolia; W 3–0	Indonesia; L 2–3	Did not advance		

Women

Athlete	Event	Round of 64	Round of 32	Round of 16	Quarter-finals	Semi-finals	Final	
Athlete	Event	Opposition Score	Opposition Score	Opposition Score	Opposition Score	Opposition Score	Opposition Score	Rank
Letshanaa Karupathevan	Singles	Chiu P-c (TPE); L 13–21, 13–21	Did not advance					
Wong Ling Ching	Singles	Bye	U Hooda (IND); L 21–14, 20–22, 21–19	Did not advance				
Pearly Tan; Thinaah Muralitharan	Doubles	—N/a	R A Rose / F Setianingrum (INA); W 21–13, 21–11	H Mijad / N Tungkasatan (THA); W 21–8, 21–12	T Jolly / G Gopichand (IND); W 21–18, 21–9	Liu S / Tan N (CHN); L 21–16, 20–22, 12–21	Did not advance	3rd place, bronze medalist(s)
Low Zi Yu; Aqilah Maisarah	Doubles	—N/a	Hsu Y-h / Lin J-y (TPE); L 10-21, 13-21	Did not advance				
Letshanaa Karupathevan; Wong Ling Ching; Pearly Tan; Thinaah Muralitharan; Low Zi Yu; Aqilah Maisarah; Oo Shan Zi; Eng Ler Qi; Cheng Su Yin; Shevon Jemie Lai	Team	—N/a		Hong Kong; W 3–0	South Korea; L 1–3	Did not advance		

Mixed

Athlete	Event	Round of 32	Round of 16	Quarter-finals	Semi-finals	Final	
Athlete	Event	Opposition Score	Opposition Score	Opposition Score	Opposition Score	Opposition Score	Rank
Chen Tang Jie; Cheng Su Yin	Doubles	A Jumar / U Akter (BAN); W 21–14, 21–9	Kim J-h / Jang H-j (KOR); L 16-21, 22-20, 19-21	Did not advance			
Goh Soon Huat; Shevon Jemie Lai	Doubles	Yang P-h / Hu L-f (TPE); W 21–14, 21–11	D Kapila / T Crasto (IND); L 20-22, 22-24	Did not advance			

== Basketball ==
=== 5x5 basketball ===
Athlete	Event	Group stage				Quarter-final	Semi-final	Final / BM	
Athlete	Event	Opposition Score	Opposition Score	Opposition Score	Rank	Opposition Score	Opposition Score	Opposition Score	Rank
Malaysia women	Women's tournament	South Korea; L 40–106	Chinese Taipei; L 59–98	Mongolia; L 81–89	4	Did not advance			

==== Women's tournament ====
Team roster

- Tan Sin Jie
- Sammi Tan
- Chia Mun Yi
- Tan Pei Jei
- Magdelene Low
- Sandra Choe
- Lim Jing Zhe
- Trixie Teo
- Foo Suet Ying
- Chong Yin Yin
- Yap Fook Yee
- Joey Sim

Preliminary Rounds – Group C

Pos	Team	Pld	W	L	PF	PA	PD	Pts	Qualification
1	South Korea	3	3	0	267	160	+107	6	Quarterfinals
2	Chinese Taipei	3	2	1	233	199	+34	5	Quarterfinals
3	Mongolia	3	1	2	217	245	−28	4	Quarterfinals
4	Malaysia	3	0	3	180	293	−113	3	

Source: aichi-nagoya2026.org

18 September 2026
10:00

Report

South Korea	106–40	Malaysia
Scoring by quarter: 22–10, 37–12, 22–10, 25–8
Pts: Lee S. 21; Rebs: Hong 12; Asts: An 10		Pts: Chong 9 Rebs: Phey Chyi, Yap 4 Asts: Foo 6

Aichi International Arena, Nagoya
Attendance: 7,791
Referees: Mohammad Taha (JOR), Hu Jing (CHN), Abdullah Al-Hejaili (KSA)

21 September 2026
16:00

Report

Malaysia	59–98	Chinese Taipei
Scoring by quarter: 13–18, 11–32, 16–25, 19–23
Pts: Tan P. J. 19; Rebs: Sammi, Chia 5 Asts: Foo, Chong 3		Pts: Han 14; Rebs: Hsiao 14; Asts: Lin Y. T. 11

Aichi International Arena, Nagoya
Attendance: 3,863
Referees: Budi Marfan (INA), Ami Takano (JPN), Mahsa Kargari (IRI)

22 September 2026
19:00

Report

Mongolia	89–81	Malaysia
Scoring by quarter: 18–14, 28–26, 20–9, 23–32
Pts: O. Khulan 31; Rebs: O. Khulan 12; Asts: Bat-erdene 7		Pts: Yap 16; Rebs: Tan S. 7 Asts: Tan S. 8

Aichi International Arena, Nagoya
Attendance: 5,883
Referees: Yuen Chun Yip (HKG), Mohammad Taha (JOR), Nattapong Jontapa (THA)

=== 3x3 basketball ===
Athlete	Event	Group stage				Play-in	Quarter-final	Semi-final	Final / BM	
Athlete	Event	Opposition Score	Opposition Score	Opposition Score	Rank	Opposition Score	Opposition Score	Opposition Score	Opposition Score	Rank
Chong Zhen Yang; Te Yi Hang; Pan Zheng Hao; Lim Ting Xuan	Men's tournament	Hong Kong; W 18–15	China; L 14-22	Iran; L 7–21	3 Q	Chinese Taipei; L 14–21	Did not advance			
Erica Ng Mun Shuen; Low Ler Yee; Sammi Tan; Elaine Chong Hui Lin	Women's tournament	Macau; W 14–3	Mongolia; W 17–11	Philippines; L 12–17	2 Q	Japan; L 9–13	Did not advance			

== Beach volleyball ==
Athlete	Event	Group stage			Round of 16	Quarter-final	Semi-final	Final / BM	
Athlete	Event	Opposition Score	Opposition Score	Rank	Opposition Score	Opposition Score	Opposition Score	Opposition Score	Rank
Goh Yu Heng; Rachael Goh Yu Jie	Women's tournament	Kim / Shin (KOR); L 1–2	Naraphornrapat / Kongphopsarutawadee (THA); L 0–2	3	Did not advance				

== Cricket ==
The Malaysian men's and women's cricket teams qualified through qualifying events held in West Coast and Kuala Lumpur.

Team	Event	Group stage			Quarter-final	Semi-final	Final / BM	
Team	Event	Opposition Score	Opposition Score	Rank	Opposition Score	Opposition Score	Opposition Score	Rank
Malaysia men's	Men's tournament	Hong Kong; W 84/2–82/9	Oman; Abandoned	1	Bangladesh; L NR	Did not advance		5
Malaysia women's	Women's tournament	—N/a			Sri Lanka; L 74/7–160/4	Did not advance		8

=== Men's tournament ===
Roster

- Pavandeep Jagjit Singh (17)
- Muhammad Azri Azhar Amaluz Zaman (88)
- Aslam Khan Malik (18)
- Rahim Khan Malik (21)
- Ainool Hafizs Md Yatim (10)
- Muhamad Syahadat Ramli (24)
- Vijay Unni Suresh (72)
- Muhammad Haziq Aiman Mohd Hafiz (19)
- Amirkhan Malik (25)
- Virandeep Singh (23)
- Sharvin Muniyandy (33)
- Muhammad Akram Abd Malek (56)
- Muhammad Wafiq Irfan Zarbani (11)
- Syed Aziz Mubarak (7)
- Muhammad Amir Azim Abd Shukor (8)

Group stage

Pos	Team	Pld	W	L	T	NR	Pts	NRR	Qualification
1	Malaysia	2	1	0	0	1	3	2.950	Advanced to the knockout stage
2	Hong Kong	2	1	1	0	0	2	−0.075	Advanced to the knockout stage
3	Oman	2	0	1	0	1	1	−2.050	Eliminated

Source: Cricinfo

Match 2
24 September 2026
14:00
Scorecard

Hong Kong; 81/9 (20 overs)	v	Malaysia; 84/2 (12 overs)
Shiv Mathur 29 (39); Pavandeep Singh 3/11 (4 overs)		Muhamad Syahadat 36* (32); Nasrulla Rana 2/23 (3 overs)

Malaysia won by 8 wickets
Kōrogi Sports Park, Nisshin
Umpires: Prageeth Rambukwella (SL) and Gazi Sohel (Ban)

- Hong Kong won the toss and elected to bat.

Match 6
26 September 2026
14:00
Scorecard

Malaysia	v	Oman

Match abandoned
Kōrogi Sports Park, Nisshin
Umpires: Nitin Menon (Ind) and Chris Thurgate (Jpn)

- No toss.
- No play was possible due to rain.

Quarter-final

Quarterfinal 4
29 September 2026
14:00
Scorecard

Bangladesh	v	Malaysia

Match abandoned
Kōrogi Sports Park, Nisshin
Umpires: Faisal Afridi (Pak) and Farooq Khan (Afg)

- No toss.
- No play was possible due to rain.
- Bangladesh advanced by virtue of being the higher-seeded team.

=== Women's tournament ===
Roster

- Mas Elysa (c)
- Nur Arianna Natsya (vc)
- Aina Najwa (wk)
- Winifred Duraisingam
- Wan Julia (wk)
- Ainna Hamizah Hashim
- Mahirah Izzati Ismail
- Aisya Eleesa
- Nur Dania Syuhada
- Amalin Sorfina
- Dhanusri Muhunan
- Musfirah Nur Ainaa
- Nazatul Hidayah Husna
- Nur Qalysha
- Nurin Imanina

Quarter-finals

Quarter-final 3
18 September 2026
09:00
Scorecard

Sri Lanka; 160/4 (20 overs)	v	Malaysia; 74/7 (20 overs)
Chamari Athapaththu 63 (37); Nurin Imanina 3/29 (4 overs)		Winifred Duraisingam 28 (47); Chamari Athapaththu 2/3 (2 overs)

Sri Lanka won by 86 runs
Kōrogi Sports Park, Nisshin
Umpires: Gayathri Venugopalan (Ind) and Saleema Imtiaz (Pak)

- Sri Lanka won the toss and elected to bat.

== Cycling ==
=== BMX freestyle ===
Athlete	Event	Seeding		Final	
Athlete	Event	Score	Rank	Score	Rank
Nur Airen Sofea	Women's park	25.7	6 Q	31.6	6

=== Track ===
Men

Athlete	Event	Qualifying		First Round / Round of 16				Round of 8				Quarter-finals		Semi-finals		Finals / BM / Pl.	
Athlete	Event	Time	Rank	Time	Rank	Repechage	Rank	Time	Rank	Repechage	Rank	Time	Rank	Time	Rank	Time/Score	Rank
Azizulhasni Awang	Keirin	—N/a		9.757	2 Q	—N/a								10.180	1 Q	10.330	1st place, gold medalist(s)
Shah Firdaus Sahrom	Keirin	—N/a		10.273	2 Q	—N/a								10.266	3 Q	10.678	5
Azizulhasni Awang	Sprint	9.467	3 Q	10.939	1 Q	—N/a		10.576	1 Q	—N/a		10.241; 10.101	1 Q	+0.172 +0.004	2 QB	18.462; 10.291	3rd place, bronze medalist(s)
Shah Firdaus Sahrom	Sprint	9.850	9 Q	10.537	2 R	10.687	1 Q	10.384	2 R	10.577	3	Did not advance					
Fadhil Zonis; Shah Firdaus Sahrom; Ridwan Sahrom; Akmal Nazimi Jusena	Team sprint	44.827	6 Q	44.210	4 QB	—N/a										44.341	4

Men's omnium

Athlete	Event	Points				Total	Rank
Athlete	Event	Points race	Elimination race	Scratch race	Tempo race	Total	Rank
Lau Newjoe	Omnium	28	30	24	28	110	7

Women

Athlete	Event	Qualifying		First Round / Round of 16				Round of 8				Quarter-finals		Semi-finals		Finals / BM / Pl.	
Athlete	Event	Time	Rank	Time	Rank	Repechage	Rank	Time	Rank	Repechage	Rank	Time	Rank	Time	Rank	Time/Score	Rank
Nurul Izzah Izzati	Keirin	—N/a		11.091	1 Q	—N/a								11.213	2 Q	10.952	3rd place, bronze medalist(s)
Nur Alyssa Farid	Keirin	—N/a		11.057	2 Q	—N/a								11.965	1 Q	11.496	5
Nurul Izzah Izzati	Sprint	10.764	6 Q	11.357	1 Q	—N/a		11.255	1 Q	—N/a		+0.076 +0.049	2	Did not advance			
Nur Alyssa Farid	Sprint	10.708	4 Q	11.321	1 Q	—N/a		11.583	1 Q	—N/a		11.246; 11.365	1 Q	+0.172 +0.110	2 QB	+0.792 +0.100	4
Nurul Izzah Izzati; Nurul Aliana Syafika; Nur Alyssa Farid; Anis Amira Rosidi	Team sprint	48.187	2 Q	48.023	2 QG	—N/a										48.566	2nd place, silver medalist(s)

== Diving ==
Men

Athlete	Event	Preliminary		Final	
Athlete	Event	Score	Rank	Score	Rank
Muhammad Syafiq Puteh	1m springboard	—N/a		323.25	6
Yong Rui Jie	1m springboard	—N/a		197.75	14
Muhammad Syafiq Puteh	3m springboard	325.95	10 Q	357.3	6
Yong Rui Jie	3m springboard	295.05	11 Q	337.8	12
Elvis Priestly Clement	10m platform	313.35	9 Q	352.10	8
Bertrand Rhodict Lises	10m platform	366.55	5 Q	375.10	5
Nurqayyum Nazmi; Yong Rui Jie	Synchronized 3m springboard	—N/a		345.81	3rd place, bronze medalist(s)
Elvis Priestly Clement; Enrique Maccartney Harold	Synchronized 10m platform	—N/a		377.52	2nd place, silver medalist(s)

Women

Athlete	Event	Preliminary		Final	
Athlete	Event	Score	Rank	Score	Rank
Ong Ker Ying	1m springboard	—N/a		208.85	6
Lee Yiat Qing	3m springboard	212.2	8 Q	204.6	8
Ong Ker Ying	3m springboard	225.6	5 Q	216	7
Nur Eilisha Rania	10m platform	222.1	10 Q	216.6	11
Pandelela Rinong	10m platform	243.8	8 Q	289.15	6
Lee Yiat Qing; Ong Ker Ying	Synchronized 3m springboard	—N/a		243.72	3rd place, bronze medalist(s)
Nur Eilisha Rania; Pandelela Rinong	Synchronized 10m platform	—N/a		247.29	4

== Equestrian ==
Dressage

Athlete	Horse	Event	Prix St-Georges		Intermediate I		Intermediate I Freestyle	
Athlete	Horse	Event	Score (%)	Rank	Score (%)	Rank	Score (%)	Rank
Diani Lee Cheng Ni	SAM 1108	Individual	56.677	43	59.764	39	Did not advance	

Jumping

Athlete	Horse	Event	Final			
Athlete	Horse	Event	1		2	
Athlete	Horse	Event	Time (s)	Rank	Time (s)	Rank
Shoorendran Nageswaran	Limelight AD	Individual	78.89	12	80.43	6

== Esports ==
As of 23 July 2026, Malaysia has qualified for five events through qualifying tournaments held in Ho Chi Minh City, Kuala Lumpur, and Singapore.

Gran Turismo 7

Athlete	Event	Qualification		Semi-final		Final						Rank
Athlete	Event	Result	Rank	Result	Rank	Race 1	Rank	Race 2	Rank	Race 3	Rank	Rank
Taj Izrin Aiman	Gran Turismo 7	2:12.004	5 Q	20:37.914	2 Q	14:36.103	2	20:00.106	2	25:07.185	1	1st place, gold medalist(s)

PUBG Mobile

Athlete	Event	WWCD	Place	Elims	Total	Rank
Nor Azmie Nazrie; Luqman Hakim Hasan; Faliq Fitri Faizul; Hazim Irfan Kamarudin; Rezza Shah Azmi	PUBG Mobile	0	21	26	47	10

Team

Athlete	Event	Group stage				Quarter-final	Semi-final	Final / BM	
Athlete	Event	Opposition Score	Opposition Score	Opposition Score	Rank	Opposition Score	Opposition Score	Opposition Score	Rank
Farish Luzman; Hariz Hazmi Hakimin	eFootball	Kazakhstan (KAZ); W 2–0	Tajikistan (TJK); W 2–0	—N/a	1 Q	Thailand (THA); W 2–0	Uzbekistan (UZB); W 2–0	Iran (IRI); L 2–4	2nd place, silver medalist(s)
Gan Hong Ming; George Chin Shan Yuan; Yiau Wen Feng; Vincent Yii Kai Liang; Nicky Ho Jun Hong; Ng Wei Hao; Cheah Euggee	Identity V	South Korea (KOR); W 2–0	Hong Kong (HKG); W 1–0	Vietnam (VIE); W 2–0	1 Q	Philippines (PHI); W 2–0	Japan (JPN); L 0–2	Did not advance	3rd place, bronze medalist(s)
Chang Ming Hao; Tuan Abdullah Tuan Ab Rashid; Cheong Eu Joon; Chan Boon Chong; Tan Chun Chung	Naraka: Bladepoint	Thailand (THA); L 0–2	China (CHN); L 0–2	Indonesia (INA); L 0–2	4	Did not advance			
Soh Jireh; Khairul Amirin Kamarulnizam; Ang Jing En; Lim Yew Siang; Eric Sia Sze Pin; Alvin Lim Ming Siang	League of Legends	United Arab Emirates (UAE); L 0–1	Vietnam (VIE); L 0–1	Saudi Arabia (KSA); L 0–1	4	—N/a	Did not advance		
Nicholas Ng Khai Shuan; Chen Tat Yann; Lim Chee Hong; Chong Han Hui; Ryan Na Jie Rong; Lee Han Siang	Honor of Kings	Kazakhstan (KAZ); W 2–0	Philippines (PHI); W 2–1	—N/a	1 Q	Myanmar (MYA); W 2–0	Hong Kong (HKG); W 2–0	China (CHN); L 0–4	2nd place, silver medalist(s)
Muhammad Qayyum Ariffin; Muhammad Danial Fuad; Muhammad Haqqullah; Hazziq Danish Rizwan; Danish Fitri Razman; Muhamad Razif Sazali	Mobile Legends: Bang Bang	Indonesia (INA); W 2–0	Saudi Arabia (KSA); W 2–1	—N/a	1 Q	Jordan (JOR); W 2–0	Myanmar (MYA); L 0–2	Did not advance	3rd place, bronze medalist(s)
Derek Chan Cheong Kei; Darren Lam Chun Kit; Chye Lik Hen; Ng Zun Shen; Ng Zun Yang; Lam Wei Heng	Pokémon Unite	Chinese Taipei (TPE); L 0–2	Kazakhstan (KAZ); W 2–0	Philippines (PHI); L 0–2	3 Q	Indonesia (INA); L 0–2	Did not advance		

== Field hockey ==
The Malaysian men's and women’s hockey squads qualified after finishing in the top five at the 2022 Asian Games.

Summary

Key:

- P – Match decided by penalty-shootout.

Team	Event	Group stage						Semi-final	Final / BM / Pl		
Team	Event	Opposition Score	Opposition Score	Opposition Score	Opposition Score	Opposition Score	Rank	Opposition Score	Opposition Score	Opposition Score	Rank
Malaysia men’s	Men's tournament	Uzbekistan; W 7–0	Oman; W 7–0	Thailand; W 10–0	Pakistan; W 5–4	China; W 5–0	1 Q	South Korea; W 2–1	India; L 1–5	–	2nd place, silver medalist(s)
Malaysia women’s	Women's tournament	Kazakhstan; W 5–0	Bangladesh; W 3–1	China; L 0–4	Chinese Taipei; W 5–0	South Korea; L 1–2	3	Did not advance	Indonesia; W 3–0	Thailand; W 4–0	5

=== Men's tournament ===
Team squads

The following is the Malaysia roster in the men's field hockey tournament of the 2026 Asian Games.

Head coach: (South Africa) Brendon Carolan

6. Marhan Jalil (C)
7. Fitri Saari
10. Faizal Saari
11. Akhimullah Anuar
15. Shello Silverius
16. Zaimi Mat Deris (GK)
18. Faiz Jali
20. Ashran Hamsani
21. Hafizuddin Othman (GK)
22. Norsyafiq Sumantri
23. Abu Kamal Azrai
24. Aiman Rozemi
26. Muhajir Abdu Rauf
27. Shafiq Hassan
29. Amirul Azahar
30. Faris Harizan
31. Azimuddin Kamaruddin
32. Aminuddin Mohd Zain
35. Andywalfian Jeffrynus
46. Nur Aqilrullah Che

Preliminary round

Pos	Team	Pld	W	D	L	GF	GA	GD	Pts	Qualification
1	Malaysia	5	5	0	0	34	4	+30	15	Semi-finals
2	Pakistan	5	4	0	1	28	8	+20	12	Semi-finals
3	China	5	3	0	2	13	10	+3	9	Fifth place classification
4	Thailand	5	2	0	3	5	28	−23	6	Fifth place classification
5	Uzbekistan	5	1	0	4	6	20	−14	3	Ninth place game
6	Oman	5	0	0	5	4	20	−16	0	Eleventh place game

Source: FIH
Rules for classification: 1) points; 2) matches won; 3) goal difference; 4) goals for; 5) head-to-head result; 6) field goals for.

20 September 2026
13:00

Malaysia	7–0	Uzbekistan
Sumantri 11'; Fa. Saari 15', 24', 43'; Kamaruddin 36'; Azrai 59'; Jali 60'	Report

Gifu Prefectural Green Stadium
Umpires:
Khalid Hussain (HKG)
Hideki Kinoshita (JPN)

22 September 2026
15:00

Malaysia	7–0	Oman
Fa. Saari 3', 43'; Rozemi 17'; Azrai 24', 57'; Silverius 30'; Anuar 57'	Report

Gifu Prefectural Green Stadium
Umpires:
Deepak Joshi (IND)
Mohammad Shahbaz Ali (BAN)

24 September 2026
09:00

Thailand	0–10	Malaysia
	Report	Fa. Saari 18', 35'; Abdu Rauf 20'; Azrai 21', 41'; Mohd Zain 28'; Hamsani 35'; Silverius 55'; Jali 59'; Anuar 60'

Gifu Prefectural Green Stadium
Umpires:
Khalid Hussain (HKG)
Lim Hong-Zhen (SGP)

26 September 2026
13:00

Malaysia	5–4	Pakistan
Silverius 5', 56'; Fa. Saari 23'; Fi. Saari 45'; Azrai 57'	Report	Khan 3', 39', 43', 46'

Gifu Prefectural Green Stadium
Umpires:
You Hyo-sik (KOR)
James Unkles (AUS)

28 September 2026
09:00

China	0–5	Malaysia
	Report	Fi. Saari 13'; Anuar 22'; Hamsani 24'; Fa. Saari 43'; Azrai 59'

Gifu Prefectural Green Stadium
Umpires:
Lim Hong-Zhen (SGP)
Mohammad Shahbaz Ali (BAN)

Semi-final

1 October 2026
19:00

Malaysia	2–1	South Korea
Azrai 40', 45'	Report	Lee G. 42'

Gifu Prefectural Green Stadium
Umpires:
Sean Rapaport (RSA)
Lim Hong-Zhen (SGP)

Gold medal match

3 October 2026
19:00

India	5–1	Malaysia
Harmanpreet 11', 57'; Jugraj 23'; Hardik 42'; Lakra 54'	Report	Silverius 14'

Gifu Prefectural Green Stadium
Umpires:
Sean Rapaport (RSA)
Lim Hong-Zhen (SGP)

=== Women's tournament ===
Team squads

The following is the Malaysia roster in the women's field hockey tournament of the 2026 Asian Games.

Head coach: (Malaysia) C.R Kumar

2. Zati Muhamad
4. Siti Mohd
6. Zawiatul Hartomo
7. Azmyra Azhairy
9. Nurhanie Tarmizi
11. Nur Azhar
12. Nur Mazlan
13. Nur Mohd
14. Siti Shaikh
17. Anith Humaira Baharudin
18. Nur Shamine Azureen
19. Insyirah Effarizal
20. Fitrinur Ramlee (GK)
21. Fatin Sukri
22. Siti Husain
25. Khairunnisa Mohd
26. Nuramirah Zulkifli
27. Nurmaizatul Syafi
32. Nur Zainal (GK)
35. Noor Hasliza Ali (C)

Preliminary round

Pos	Team	Pld	W	D	L	GF	GA	GD	Pts	Qualification
1	China	5	5	0	0	46	0	+46	15	Semi-finals
2	South Korea	5	4	0	1	20	5	+15	12	Semi-finals
3	Malaysia	5	3	0	2	14	7	+7	9	Fifth place classification
4	Chinese Taipei	5	2	0	3	8	21	−13	6	Fifth place classification
5	Bangladesh	5	0	1	4	6	30	−24	1	Ninth place game
6	Kazakhstan	5	0	1	4	4	35	−31	1	Eleventh place game

Source: FIH
Rules for classification: 1) points; 2) matches won; 3) goal difference; 4) goals for; 5) head-to-head result; 6) field goals for.

18 September 2026
19:00

Malaysia	5–0	Kazakhstan
Zulkifli 9', 21'; Mohd 12'; Azhar 17', 49'	Report

Gifu Prefectural Green Stadium
Umpires:
Liu Xiaoying (CHN)
Rama Potnis (IND)

21 September 2026
19:00

Bangladesh	1–3	Malaysia
Akter 25'	Report	Zulkifli 40', 59'; Muhamad 44'

Gifu Prefectural Green Stadium
Umpires:
Yu Tian (CHN)
Kim Yoon-seon (KOR)

23 September 2026
19:00

Malaysia	0–4	China
	Report	Yu 2'; Zhong 25', 44'; Zhang 47'

Gifu Prefectural Green Stadium
Umpires:
Daulet Urmanov (KAZ)
Aleisha Neumann (AUS)

25 September 2026
19:00

Chinese Taipei	0–5	Malaysia
	Report	Mohd 9'; Shaikh 10'; Zulkifli 12'; Husain 15+', 50'

Gifu Prefectural Green Stadium
Umpires:
Liu Xiaoying (CHN)
Zarina Ilyassova (KAZ)

27 September 2026
15:00

Malaysia	1–2	South Korea
Syafi 60'	Report	Park Seu. 15+'; An 29'

Gifu Prefectural Green Stadium
Umpires:
Aleisha Neumann (AUS)
Liu Xiaoying (CHN)

Fifth place Crossover

30 September 2026
11:30

Malaysia	3–0	Indonesia
Muhamad 20'; Mohd 41', 55'	Report

Gifu Prefectural Green Stadium
Umpires:
Valerie Koh (SGP)
Yu Tian (CHN)

Fifth place match

2 October 2026
14:00

Malaysia	4–0	Thailand
Mohd 14', 18'; Azhar 22'; Mazlan 53'	Report

Gifu Prefectural Green Stadium
Umpires:
Kelly Hudson (NZL)
Aleisha Neumann (AUS)

== Gymnastics ==
=== Artistic ===
Men's individual

Athlete	Event	Qualification		Final	
Athlete	Event	Score	Rank	Score	Rank
Sharul Aimy	Men's vault	13.833	5 Q	13.499	8

Women's team

Athlete	Event	Qualification						Final					
Athlete	Event	Apparatus				Total	Rank	Apparatus				Total	Rank
Athlete	Event	VT	UB	BB	FX	Total	Rank	VT	UB	BB	FX	Total	Rank
Rachel Yeoh Li Wen	Women's team	—N/a	14.000	12.200	—N/a	147.864	5 Q	—N/a	13.900	12.333	—N/a	149.063	5
Cadence Teh Zi Qi	Women's team	11.800	11.833	~~11.400~~	11.900	147.864	5 Q	12.133	11.966	12.733	11.933	149.063	5
Nicole Wong Ziyi	Women's team	~~11.633~~	~~DNS~~	11.900	~~DNS~~	147.864	5 Q	—N/a				149.063	5
Marissa Zaiful Azian	Women's team	12.833	—N/a		11.633	147.864	5 Q	12.866	—N/a		11.900	149.063	5
Yeap Kang Xian	Women's team	12.933	12.166	12.266	12.400	147.864	5 Q	12.900	11.933	11.933	12.533	149.063	5
Total	Women's team	37.566	37.999	36.366	35.933	147.864	5 Q	37.899	37.799	36.999	36.366	149.063	5

Women's individual

Athlete	Event	Qualification						Final					
Athlete	Event	Apparatus				Total	Rank	Apparatus				Total	Rank
Athlete	Event	VT	UB	BB	FX	Total	Rank	VT	UB	BB	FX	Total	Rank
Rachel Yeoh Li Wen	Uneven bars	—N/a	14.000	—N/a		14.000	5 Q	—N/a	12.733	—N/a		12.733	7
Rachel Yeoh Li Wen	Balance beam	—N/a		12.200	—N/a	12.200	20	Did not advance					
Cadence Teh Zi Qi	All-around	—N/a						11.800	11.833	11.400	11.900	46.933	15
Cadence Teh Zi Qi	Uneven bars	—N/a	11.833	—N/a		11.833	19	Did not advance					
Cadence Teh Zi Qi	Balance beam	—N/a		11.400	—N/a	11.400	33	Did not advance					
Cadence Teh Zi Qi	Floor exercise	—N/a			11.900	11.900	25	Did not advance					
Nicole Wong Ziyi	All-around	—N/a						11.633	DNS	11.900	DNS	DNF	
Nicole Wong Ziyi	Uneven bars	—N/a	DNS	—N/a				Did not advance					
Nicole Wong Ziyi	Balance beam	—N/a		11.900	—N/a	11.900	24	Did not advance					
Nicole Wong Ziyi	Floor exercise	—N/a			DNS	—N/a		Did not advance					
Marissa Zaiful Azian	Vault	12.849	—N/a			12.849	8 Q	12.733	—N/a			12.733	8
Marissa Zaiful Azian	Floor exercise	—N/a			11.633	11.633	31	Did not advance					
Yeap Kang Xian	All-around	—N/a						12.933	12.166	12.266	12.400	49.765	11
Yeap Kang Xian	Uneven bars	—N/a	12.166	—N/a		12.166	17	Did not advance					
Yeap Kang Xian	Balance beam	—N/a		12.266	—N/a	12.266	19	Did not advance					
Yeap Kang Xian	Vault	13.049	—N/a			13.049	6 Q	12.983	—N/a			12.983	7
Yeap Kang Xian	Floor exercise	—N/a			12.400	12.400	19	Did not advance					

=== Rhythmic ===
Athlete	Event	Qualification				Final			
Athlete	Event	Apparatus		Total	Rank	Apparatus		Total	Rank
Athlete	Event	5 Balls	3 Hoops & 2 Clubs	Total	Rank	5 Balls	3 Hoops & 2 Clubs	Total	Rank
Maia Ong Xiao Han	Group all-around	14.650	18.700	33.350	10 R2				
Victoria Tan Fu Hui	Group all-around	14.650	18.700	33.350	10 R2				
Low Ee Shuen	Group all-around	14.650	18.700	33.350	10 R2				
Carol Na Yuan Qi	Group all-around	14.650	18.700	33.350	10 R2				
Bernice See Qin Nin	Group all-around	14.650	18.700	33.350	10 R2				

== Judo ==
Athlete	Event	Round of 16	Quarter-final	Semi-final	Final / BM	Rank
Athlete	Event	Opposition Score	Opposition Score	Opposition Score	Opposition Score	Rank
Amir Daniel Abdul Majeed	Men's -81 kg	Fujiwara (JPN); L Ippon	Did not advance			

== Ju-jitsu ==
Men

Athlete	Event	Round of 32	Round of 16	Quarter-final	Semi-final	Final / BM	Rank
Athlete	Event	Opposition Score	Opposition Score	Opposition Score	Opposition Score	Opposition Score	Rank
Adam Akasyah	-77 kg	Al-Kuzai (JOR); W 50–0	Koo (KOR); L 0–2	Did not advance			

== Kabaddi ==
Athlete	Event	Group stage					Semi-final	Final	
Athlete	Event	Opposition Score	Opposition Score	Opposition Score	Opposition Score	Rank	Opposition Score	Opposition Score	Rank
Harvison Loud Lourdasamy; Vicram Ravidran; Navindran Subramaniam; Madhava Rao Rama Naidu; Navinessh Ragunathen; Navin Kannan; Muralitaran Suresh; Suresh Leong Kim Seng; Nashwein Nair Kumaran; Sivabalan Ravichandran; Devinthirakumaar Vijayan Kumaran; Prithiswaran Kaliyappan	Men's tournament	Pakistan; L 22–65	Thailand; L 23–65	Iran; L 33–67	Nepal; L 52–73	5	Did not advance		

== Karate ==
Kata

Athlete	Event	Round of 16	Repechage	Quarter-finals	Semi-finals	Final / BM	
Athlete	Event	Opposition Score	Opposition Score	Opposition Score	Opposition Score	Opposition Score	Rank
Mohamad Haznil Henry	Men's individual	Fong MH (MAC); L 0–5	Tu C-h (TPE); W 5–0	—N/a		Hung (HKG); L 0–5	4
Muhammad Aiqal Asmadie; Mohamad Haznil Henry; Mukhriz Mazlan	Men's team	—N/a		Bye	Kuwait; L 0–5	Vietnam; W 3–2	3rd place, bronze medalist(s)

Kumite

Athlete	Event	Round of 16	Quarter-finals	Repechage	Semi-finals	Final / BM	
Athlete	Event	Opposition Score	Opposition Score	Opposition Score	Opposition Score	Opposition Score	Rank
Thevendran Kaliana Sundram	Men's –55 kg	—N/a	Khalimov (UZB); L 0–3	—N/a		Manandhar (NEP); W 9–1	3rd place, bronze medalist(s)
Sureeya Sankar Hari Sankar	Men's –60 kg	Hosen (BAN); W 5–0	Gurbanmyradow (TKM); W 3–2	—N/a	Abdelhamid (QAT); L 1–7	Chu (VIE); W 10–2	3rd place, bronze medalist(s)
Shahmalarani Chandran	–50 kg	Fong MW (MAC); W 8–0	Jaman (BAN); W 5–4	—N/a	Alimardanova (UZB); W 3–2	Tsang YT (HKG); W 0–0 (Hantei)	1st place, gold medalist(s)
Adeola Fay Robert	Women's –55 kg	Jasem (KUW); W 9–1	Rakhimova (UZB); W 8–7	—N/a	Samasheva (KAZ); W 5–4	Saeidabadi (IRI); W 6–4	1st place, gold medalist(s)
Zakiah Adnan	Women's –61 kg	—N/a	Gong L (CHN); L 1–8	Shimada (JPN); L 1–1	Did not advance		

== Modern pentathlon ==
Two pentathletes represented Malaysia at the Games.

Athlete	Event	Fencing ranking round (épée one touch)		Semi-finals													Final												
Athlete	Event	Fencing ranking round (épée one touch)		Fencing		Obstacles			Swimming (100 m freestyle)			Laser-run (10 m laser pistol / 3000 m cross-country)			Total points	Final rank	Fencing		Obstacles			Swimming			Laser-run			Total points	Final rank
Athlete	Event	V–D	Rank	Rank	MP points	Time	Rank	MP points	Time	Rank	MP points	Time	Rank	MP points	Total points	Final rank	Rank	MP points	Time	Rank	MP points	Time	Rank	MP points	Time	Rank	MP points	Total points	Final rank
Aw Jian Ting	Men	7–28	34	15	206	39.52	17	327	59.86	12	301	13:37.30	17	483	1317	16	Did not advance												
Lim Pei Yao	Women	9–23	27	13	210	EL			1:11.88	13	241	10:10.79	15	350	801	15	Did not advance												

== Padel ==
Athlete	Event	Round of 16	Quarter-final	Semi-final	Final / BM	Rank
Athlete	Event	Opposition Score	Opposition Score	Opposition Score	Opposition Score	Rank
Christian Didier Chin; Aidan Khairuddin Yunus	Men's pairs	Khabibulin / Danilov (KAZ); W 6–2, 3–6, 6–3	Canizares / Lapidus (PHI); W 6–3, 3–6, 6–3	Jamshidi / Shahi (IRI); W 1–6, 6–4, 6–1	Nawaf / Nawaf (QAT); L 3–6, 1–6	2nd place, silver medalist(s)
Wan Sharifah; Melanie Lau	Women's pairs	Mohammadtaghipour / Najafidehaghi (IRI); L 6–3, 4–6, 1–6	Did not advance			

== Rowing ==
One female rower represented Malaysia at the Games.

Athlete	Event	Heat		Final	
Athlete	Event	Result	Rank	Result	Rank
Nurzarinah Zakaria	Women's lightweight single sculls	8:02.00	7	Did not advance	

== Rugby sevens ==
Team	Event	Group stage				Quarter-final	Semi-final / Pl.	Final / BM / Pl.	
Team	Event	Opposition score	Opposition score	Opposition score	Rank	Opposition score	Opposition score	Opposition score	Rank
Malaysia men's	Men's tournament	China; L 21–33	Hong Kong; L 0–48	Uzbekistan; W 22–0	3 Q	Hong Kong; L 0–50	United Arab Emirates; W 33-0	Philippines; W 34-7	5
Malaysia women's	Women's tournament	China; L 0–43	Hong Kong; L 12–36	India; L 5–26	4	—N/a	Kazakhstan; L 7–17	Singapore; L 5–10	8

== Sailing ==
Athlete	Event	Race														Final	
Athlete	Event	1	2	3	4	5	6	7	8	9	10	11	12	13	14	Score	Rank
Khairulnizam Afendy	Men's ILCA 7	2	6	3	4	(9)	5	5	1	4	—N/a					39	3rd place, bronze medalist(s)
Aiman Aqeel Firdaus	Men's ILCA 4	5	6	(9)	2	6	6	6	5	6	6	(9)	5	—N/a		71	6
Muhammad Adam Aierell; Iqbal Nazham Musmuliadi	Men's 29er	2	(6)	3	2	4	5	2	4	(6)	4	3	4	—N/a		45	3rd place, bronze medalist(s)
Nur Shazrin Mohd Latif	Women's ILCA 6	(9)	4	3	9	9	2	7	6	5	—N/a					35	7
Nur Hafizanah Zailan	Women's ILCA 4	3	(8)	(6)	4	4	5	5	3	3	4	2	1	—N/a		48	4
Aina Zulaikha Azizul Rahman; Nor Izniey Humaira Azri	Women's 29er	2	2	1	3	3	(4)	4	3	3	4	(5); DNF	(5); DNF	—N/a		39	3rd place, bronze medalist(s)
Muhammad Fauzi Kaman Shah; Juni Karimah Noor Jamali	470	5	6	2	(7)	5	4	7	5	5	4	—N/a				50	5
Danyal Marczqui Rahmat; Nur Aina Norhazram	420	3	2	5	(6)	5	3	6	3	2	3	(7); UFD	6	—N/a		51	4

== Sepak takraw ==
Men

Athlete	Event	Group stage				Semi-final	Final	
Athlete	Event	Opposition score	Opposition score	Opposition score	Rank	Opposition score	Opposition score	Rank
Mohammad Syahir Mohd Rosdi; Muhammad Zulkifli Abd Razak; Mohamad Azlan Alias; Muhammad Afifuddin Mohd Razali; Aidil Azman Azwawi	Regu	Vietnam; W 2–0	Myanmar; W 2–0	—N/a	1 Q	Philippines; W 2–1	Thailand; L 0-2	2nd place, silver medalist(s)
Mohammad Syahir Mohd Rosdi; Muhammad Haziq Hairul Nizam; Muhammad Zulkifli Abd Razak; Muhammad Zarif Marican; Muhammad Hafizul Hayazi; Farhan Adam; Amirul Zazwan Amir; Mohamad Azlan Alias; Zuleffendi Sumari; Muhammad Afifuddin Mohd Razali; Muhammad Shahalril Aiman; Muhammad Noraizat Mohd Nordin; Aidil Azman Azwawi	Team regu	Japan; W 3–0	Philippines; W 3–0	India; W 3–0	1 Q	Indonesia; W 2–1	Thailand; W 2–0	1st place, gold medalist(s)

Women

Athlete	Event	Group stage				Semi-final	Final	
Athlete	Event	Opposition score	Opposition score	Opposition score	Rank	Opposition score	Opposition score	Rank
Nur Athirah Roslan; Veronica Asli; Fisydiana Faradona	Doubles	Myanmar; W 2–1	Laos; L 0–2	Vietnam; L 0–2	3	Did not advance		
Siti Norzubaidah; Kamisah Khamis; Razmah Anam; Nurul Syifa Najwa; Siti Hadinavilla Jumidil; Nor Kamalia Azwa	Quadrant	Laos; W 2–0	Indonesia; L 1–2	Japan; L 1–2	3	Did not advance		

== Shooting ==
Men

Athlete	Event	Qualification		Final	
Athlete	Event	Score	Rank	Score	Rank
Johnathan Wong	10 m air pistol	572-18x	23	Did not advance	
Joseph Lee Joon Kit	Skeet	116	13	Did not advance	

Women

Athlete	Event	Qualification		Final	
Athlete	Event	Score	Rank	Score	Rank
Alia Husna Badruddin	10 m air rifle	619.3	44	Did not advance	
Nur Suryani Taibi	10 m air rifle	610.1	52	Did not advance	
Gan Chen Jie	10 m air rifle	628.1	16	Did not advance	
Nurul Syasya Nadiah Arifin	10 m air pistol	569-16x	23	Did not advance	
Alia Sazana Azahari	25 m pistol	574-16x	19	Did not advance	
Nurul Syasya Nadiah Arifin	25 m pistol	564-11x	38	Did not advance	
Alia Husna Badruddin	50 m rifle 3 positions	583-27x	19	Did not advance	
Nur Suryani Taibi	50 m rifle 3 positions	576-22x	33	Did not advance	
Gan Chen Jie	50 m rifle 3 positions	587-37x	8 Q	299.1	8
Alia Husna Badruddin; Nur Suryani Taibi; Gan Chen Jie	10 m air rifle team	—N/a		1857.5	14
Alia Husna Badruddin; Nur Suryani Taibi; Gan Chen Jie	50 m rifle 3 positions team	—N/a		1746-86x	7

Mixed

Athlete	Event	Qualification		Final	
Athlete	Event	Score	Rank	Score	Rank
Johnathan Wong; Nurul Syasya Nadiah Arifin	10 m air pistol team	576-20x	8	Did not advance	

== Sport climbing ==
Boulder

Athlete	Event	Semi-finals		Final	
Athlete	Event	Score	Rank	Score	Rank
Ke Qun Tao	Men's	24.7	14	Did not advance	
Shareen Mohd Nasran	Women's	19.8	13	Did not advance	

Lead

Athlete	Event	Semi-finals		Final	
Athlete	Event	Score	Rank	Score	Rank
Ke Qun Tao	Men's	18	14	Did not advance	
Shareen Mohd Nasran	Women's	25	11	Did not advance	

== Squash ==
Singles

Athlete	Event	Round of 32	Round of 16	Quarter-finals	Semi-finals	Final	
Athlete	Event	Opposition Score	Opposition Score	Opposition Score	Opposition Score	Opposition Score	Rank
Ng Eain Yow	Men	Begornia (PHI); W 3–0	Ryu J-m (KOR); W 3–0	Lau TK (HKG); W 3–0	Zaman (PAK); W 3–0	Singh (IND); W 3–0	1st place, gold medalist(s)
Sanjay Jeeva	Men	Abdurakhmonov (UZB); W 3–0	Chotrani (IND); L 2–3	Did not advance			
Sivasangari Subramaniam	Women	bye	Sinaly (SRI); W 3–0	Ho TL (HKG); W 3–0	Chan SY (HKG); W 3–0	Singh (IND); W 3–0	1st place, gold medalist(s)
Aira Azman	Women	bye	Boushehrizadeh (IRI); W 3–0	Chan SY (HKG); L 1–3	Did not advance		

Doubles

Athlete	Event	Round of 16	Quarter-finals	Semi-finals	Final	
Athlete	Event	Opposition Score	Opposition Score	Opposition Score	Opposition Score	Rank
Mohd Syafiq Kamal; Aifa Azman	Mixed	Makino / Sugimoto (JPN); W 2–0	Lee KY / Tang MH (HKG); L 0–2	Did not advance		
Ameeshenraj Chandaran; Rachel Arnold	Mixed	Li HZ / Zhang YN (CHN); W 2–0	Heo M-y / Oh S-j (KOR); W 2–0	Tse YLT / Lai CN (HKG); L 0–2	—N/a	3rd place, bronze medalist(s)

Team

Athlete	Event	Group stage			Quarter-finals	Semi-finals	Finals	
Athlete	Event	Opposition Score	Opposition Score	Rank	Opposition Score	Opposition Score	Opposition Score	Rank
Ameeshenraj Chandaran; Mohd Syafiq Kamal; Sanjay Jeeva; Ng Eain Yow	Men	Thailand (THA); W 3–0	Qatar (QAT); W 3–0	1 Q	Japan (JPN); W 2–0	India (IND); W 2–1	Pakistan (PAK); W 2–0	1st place, gold medalist(s)
Aifa Azman; Aira Azman; Rachel Arnold; Sivasangari Subramaniam	Women	Macau (MAC); W 3–0	Singapore (SGP); W 3–0	1 Q	Macau (MAC); W 2–0	Japan (JPN); W 2–0	Hong Kong (HKG); W 2–1	1st place, gold medalist(s)

== Surfing ==
A two-athlete surfing squad has been confirmed to have qualified through the 2025 Asian Surfing Championships.

Athlete	Event	Round 1		Round 2	Round 3	Quarter-final	Semi-final	Final / BM	
Athlete	Event	Score	Rank	Opposition Result	Opposition Result	Opposition Result	Opposition Result	Opposition Result	Rank
Lucas Santiago Wehle	Men's shortboard	4.60	2 R2	Hakawati (LBN); W 7.34–5.30	Espejon (PHI); L 6.34–11.83	Did not advance			
Mona Rasidah Abdul Rashid	Women's shortboard	1.76	3 R2	Shiran (MDV); W 2.6–1.3	Ikeda (JPN); L 2.37–18.53	Did not advance			

Qualification legend: R3 – Qualifies to elimination rounds; R2 – Qualifies to repechage round

== Swimming ==
Nine male swimmers represented Malaysia in the competition.

Athlete	Event	Heat		Final	
Athlete	Event	Time	Rank	Time	Rank
Tong Yu Jing	50m butterfly	DNS		Did not advance	
Tong Yu Jing	50m freestyle	DNS		Did not advance	
Bryan Leong Xin Ren	50m butterfly	24.67	20	Did not advance	
Bryan Leong Xin Ren	100m butterfly	54.19	14	Did not advance	
Lim Yin Chuen	50m freestyle	23.16	24	Did not advance	
Lim Yin Chuen	100m freestyle	50.65	21	Did not advance	
Arvin Shaun Singh Chahal	100m freestyle	50.31	14	Did not advance	
Arvin Shaun Singh Chahal	200m freestyle	1:49.46	9 Q	1:49.45	8
Andrew Goh Zheng Yen	50m breaststroke	28.28	19	Did not advance	
Andrew Goh Zheng Yen	100m breaststroke	1:03.50	23	Did not advance	
Andrew Goh Zheng Yen	200m breaststroke	2:21.77	18	Did not advance	
Khiew Hoe Yean	100m backstroke	56.81	18	Did not advance	
Khiew Hoe Yean	200m freestyle	1:48.96	7 Q	1:48.58	7
Khiew Hoe Yean	400m freestyle	3:56.94	13	Did not advance	
Muhammad Dhuha Zulfikry	400m freestyle	3:58.06	16	Did not advance	
Muhammad Dhuha Zulfikry	800m freestyle	—N/a		8:13.30	14
Muhammad Dhuha Zulfikry	1500m freestyle	—N/a		15:38.23	14
Goh Li Jie	100m butterfly	56.77	27	Did not advance	
Goh Li Jie	200m butterfly	2:10.19	20	Did not advance	
Goh Li Jie	200m individual medley	DSQ		Did not advance	
Goh Li Jie	400m individual medley	4:52.72	18	Did not advance	
Tan Khai Xin	200m breaststroke	2:23.28	19	Did not advance	
Tan Khai Xin	200m butterfly	2:04.94	17	Did not advance	
Tan Khai Xin	200m individual medley	2:04.64	17	Did not advance	
Tan Khai Xin	400m individual medley	4:24.38	10 Q	4:23.99	9
Goh Li Jie; Khiew Hoe Yean; Lim Yin Chuen; Arvin Shaun Singh Chahal	4 x 100m freestyle relay	3:22.67	10	Did not advance	
Khiew Hoe Yean; Arvin Shaun Singh Chahal; Tan Khai Xin; Muhammad Dhuha Zulfikry	4 x 200m freestyle relay	7:22.05	5 Q	7:18.79	5
Andrew Goh Zheng Yen; Khiew Hoe Yean; Bryan Leong Xin Ren; Arvin Shaun Singh Chahal	4 x 100m medley relay	3:42.78	11	Did not advance	

== Table tennis ==
Two male table tennis players represented Malaysia at the Games.

Athlete	Event	Round of 64	Round of 32	Round of 16	Quarter-finals	Semi-finals	Final	
Athlete	Event	Opposition Score	Opposition Score	Opposition Score	Opposition Score	Opposition Score	Opposition Score	Rank
Javen Choong	Men's singles	Zheng HW (MAC); W 4–1	Feng Y-h (TPE); L 1–4	Did not advance				
Wong Qi Shen	Men's singles	Shah (IND); L 0–4	Did not advance					
Javen Choong; Wong Qi Shen	Men's doubles	bye	Al-Kuwari / Korani (QAT); W 3–2	Pang YE / Quek Y (SGP); L 0–3	Did not advance			

== Taekwondo ==
Poomsae

Athlete	Event	Semi-finals		Final	
Athlete	Event	Opposition Score	Rank	Opposition Score	Rank
Chin Ken Haw	Men's individual	8.7800	2 Q	8.870	7
Yow Mei Yee	Women's individual	8.230	7	Did not advance	

Kyorugi

Athlete	Event	Round of 16	Quarter-finals	Semi-finals	Final	
Athlete	Event	Opposition Score	Opposition Score	Opposition Score	Opposition Score	Rank
Muhammad Syafiq Zuber	Men's +80 kg	Huang (TPE); L 0–2	Did not advance			
Nadia Aina Syazwani Ishak	Women's –49 kg	Poolkerd (THA); L 0–2	Did not advance			

== Weightlifting ==
Athlete	Event	Snatch (kg)		Clean & Jerk (kg)		Total (kg)	Rank
Athlete	Event	Result	Rank	Result	Rank	Total (kg)	Rank
Erry Hidayat	Men's 85 kg	140	9	172	9	312	9
Mohamad Syahmi	Men's 95 kg	153	6	200	6	353	6

== Wushu ==
Seven wushu practitioners, comprising two men and five women, represented Malaysia at the Games.

Taolu

Athlete	Event	Event 1		Event 2		Total	Rank
Athlete	Event	Result	Rank	Result	Rank	Total	Rank
Danish Aizad Firdaus Chua	Men's changquan	9.70	7	—N/a	—N/a	9.70	7
Clement Ting	Men's daoshu & gunshu	9.690	4	9.713	3	19.403	3rd place, bronze medalist(s)
Lee Jia Rong	Women's changquan	9.67	10	—N/a	—N/a	9.67	10
Loh Ying Ting	Women's changquan	9.666	11	—N/a	—N/a	9.666	11
Tan Cheong Min	Women's nanquan & nandao	9.726	2	9.663	6	19.389	3rd place, bronze medalist(s)
Mandy Cebelle Chen	Women's taijiquan & taijijian	9.706	5	9.706	6	19.412	6
Pang Pui Yee	Women's jianshu & qiangshu	9.690	5	9.700	4	19.390	4
