= Esports at the 2026 Asian Games – Puyo Puyo Champions =

Puyo Puyo Champions at the 2026 Asian Games
- Dates: 24–26 September 2026
- Competitors: 10 from 10 nations

Medalists
gold medal	Yuki Kurihara (JPN)
silver medal	Kang Dong-shin (KOR)
bronze medal	Kuo Tzu-Ang (TPE)
bronze medal	Tanarak Wongkitikun (THA)

The Puyo Puyo Champions tournament at the 2026 Asian Games was held at the Aichi Sky Expo in Tokoname in Aichi Prefecture, Japan from 24 to 26 September 2026.

The Puyo Puyo Champions was introduced to the esports event of the Asian Games for the first time in this edition. It is a puzzle game where players stack falling blobs, with the goal of matching four or more blobs of the same color to send garbage globs to the opposing player. While the Puyo Puyo franchise was released in the 1990s on consoles, the series officially became part of the esport circuit in 2018.

The tournament was won by 11-year old Yuki Kurihara. He is Japan's youngest ever Asian Games medallist.

== Group stage ==
=== Group A ===
Pos	Team	Pld	W	L	GF	GA	GD	Qualification	(Japan)	(South Korea)	(Philippines)	(Hong Kong)	(Kazakhstan)
1	Yuki Kurihara (JPN) (H)	4	4	0	12	1	+11	Advance to Quarterfinals	—	—	3–0	3–0	—
2	Kang Dong-shin (KOR)	4	3	1	10	5	+5	Advance to Quarterfinals	1–3	—	3–2	3–0	3–0
3	Karl Gonzalvo (PHI)	4	2	2	8	8	0	Advance to Quarterfinals	—	—	—	3–2	—
4	Yu Wing Lim (HKG)	4	1	3	5	9	−4	Advance to First round	—	—	—	—	—
5	Alexandr Pivovarov (KAZ)	4	0	4	0	12	−12	Advance to First round	0–3	—	0–3	0–3	—

Source: Asian Games 2026
(H) Hosts

=== Group B ===
Pos	Team	Pld	W	L	GF	GA	GD	Qualification	(Chinese Taipei)	(Thailand)	(India)	(Singapore)	(Mongolia)
1	Kuo Tzu-Ang (TPE)	4	4	0	12	2	+10	Advance to Quarterfinals	—	3–0	—	3–1	—
2	Tanarak Wongkitikun (THA)	4	3	1	9	7	+2	Advance to Quarterfinals	—	—	—	3–0	—
3	Paritosh (IND)	4	2	2	8	8	0	Advance to Quarterfinals	0–3	2–3	—	3–2	3–0
4	Justin Koh (SGP)	4	1	3	6	9	−3	Advance to First round	—	—	—	—	—
5	Munkhzorig Ganbold (MGL)	4	0	4	3	12	−9	Advance to First round	1–3	2–3	—	0–3	—

Source: Asian Games 2026

== Knockout stage ==
First Round
B4	Justin Koh (SGP)	5
A5	Alexandr Pivovarov (KAZ)	4
A4	Yu Wing Lim (HKG)	5
B5	Munkhzorig Ganbold (MGL)	0

Quarter-finals
A1	Yuki Kurihara (JPN)	5
B4	Justin Koh (SGP)	0
B2	Tanarak Wongkitikun (THA)	5
A3	Karl Gonzalvo (PHI)	2
A2	Kang Dong-shin (KOR)	5
B3	Paritosh (IND)	0
B1	Kuo Tzu-Ang (TPE)	5
A4	Yu Wing Lim (HKG)	1

Semi-finals
A1	Yuki Kurihara (JPN)	10
B2	Tanarak Wongkitikun (THA)	1
A2	Kang Dong-shin (KOR)	10
B1	Kuo Tzu-Ang (TPE)	3

Final
A1	Yuki Kurihara (JPN)	10
A2	Kang Dong-shin (KOR)	2

Source: Asian Games 2026

== Final standings ==
Rank	Team
1st place, gold medalist(s)	Yuki Kurihara (JPN)
2nd place, silver medalist(s)	Kang Dong-shin (KOR)
3rd place, bronze medalist(s)	Kuo Tzu-Ang (TPE)
3rd place, bronze medalist(s)	Tanarak Wongkitikun (THA)
5	Karl Gonzalvo (PHI)
5	Justin Koh (SGP)
5	Paritosh (IND)
5	Yu Wing Lim (HKG)
9	Munkhzorig Ganbold (MGL)
9	Alexandr Pivovarov (KAZ)

Source: Asian Games 2026
