= Esports at the 2026 Asian Games – Gran Turismo 7 =

Gran Turismo 7 at the 2026 Asian Games
- Venues: Aichi Sky Expo
- Dates: 22–23 September 2026
- Competitors: 15 from 15 nations

Medalists
gold medal	Taj Izrin Aiman Taj Madira (MAS)
silver medal	Naif Abdulhakim S Al-Faleh (KSA)
bronze medal	Kim Youngchan (KOR)

The Gran Turismo 7 tournament at the 2026 Asian Games was held at the Aichi Sky Expo in Tokoname in Aichi Prefecture, Japan from 22 to 23 September 2026.

The racing game was introduced as part of the esports lineup. Esports as a medal event was introduced in the 2022 edition in Hangzhou, China.

Malaysian player Taj Izrin Aiman Taj Madira won the gold medal.

== Qualification ==
- Held on 22 September at 18:30 (UTC+9)

Player	Time	Rank
Kim Youngchan (KOR)	2:11.682	1
Ryota Kokubun (JPN)	2:11.784	2
Naif Abdulhakim S Al-Faleh (KSA)	2:11.784	2
Andika Rama Maulana (INA)	2:11.929	4
Taj Izrin Aiman Taj Madira (MAS)	2:12.004	5
Jonathan Wong (HKG)	2:12.071	6
Ar Muhammad Aleef Mohamed Rafik (SGP)	2:13.240	7
Hasan Ali (BRN)	2:13.451	8
Seyedamirhossein Hosseini (IRI)	2:14.367	9
Tugsbayar Otgonsuren (MGL)	2:14.401	10
Rashid Ahmed Al-Olan (QAT)	2:14.968	11
Sultan Khalifa Abdulrahman (UAE)	2:15.502	12
Bezhan Abdulloev (TJK)	2:17.508	13
Eldor Radjapov (UZB)	2:20.159	14
Nursultan Sutemgenov (KAZ)	2:23.409	15

Source: Asian Games 2026

== Semifinals ==
=== Group A ===
- Held on 23 September at 9:00 (UTC+9)

Order	Player	Time	Rank
1	Kim Young-chan (KOR)	20:34.777	1
3	Taj Izrin Aiman Taj Madira (MAS)	20:37.914	2
2	Andika Rama Maulana (INA)	20:38.504	3
4	Hasan Ali (BRN)	20:47.224	4
6	Sultan Khalifa Abdulrahman (UAE)	20:59.853	5
5	Seyedamirhossein Hosseini (IRI)	21:10.714	6
7	Bezhan Abdulloev (TJK)	21:54.845	7

Source: Asian Games 2026

=== Group B ===
- Held on 23 September at 10:00 (UTC+9)

Order	Player	Time	Rank
2	Ryota Kokubun (JPN)	20:30.310	1
3	Jonathan Wong (HKG)	20:38.007	2
4	Ar Muhammad Aleef Mohamed Rafik (SGP)	20:40.498	3
1	Naif Abdulhakim S Al-Faleh (KSA)	20:41.025	4
8	Nursultan Sutemgenov (KAZ)	20:50.886	5
5	Tugsbayar Otgonsuren (MGL)	20:55.977	6
7	Rashid Ahmed Al-Olan (QAT)	21:05.212	7
6	Eldor Radjapov (UZB)	21:35.225	8

Source: Asian Games 2026

== Final ==
In the final, eight players raced three times in different circuits. The rankings are determined through accumulated points.

- Held on 23 September

Player	Race 1		Race 2		Race 3		Total Pts	Rank
Player	Pos	Pts	Pos	Pts	Pos	Pts	Total Pts	Rank
Taj Izrin Aiman Taj Madira (MAS)	2	8	2	8	1	20	36	1st place, gold medalist(s)
Naif Abdulhakim S Al-Faleh (KSA)	3	6	6	3	2	16	25	2nd place, silver medalist(s)
Kim Youngchan (KOR)	6	3	1	10	3	12	25	3rd place, bronze medalist(s)
Ryota Kokubun (JPN)	1	10	3	6	6	6	22	4
Andika Rama Maulana (INA)	4	5	5	4	4	10	19	5
Ar Muhammad Aleef Mohamed Rafik (SGP)	7	2	4	5	5	8	15	6
Jonathan Wong (HKG)	5	4	7	2	7	4	10	7
Hasan Ali (BRN)	8	1	8	1	8	2	4	8

Source: Asian Games 2026
