= Esports at the 2026 Asian Games – Pokémon Unite =

Pokémon Unite at the 2026 Asian Games
- Dates: 25–27 September 2026
- Competitors: 58 from 10 nations

Medalists
gold medal	Japan
silver medal	Indonesia
bronze medal	Philippines
bronze medal	South Korea

The Pokémon Unite tournament at the 2026 Asian Games was held at the Aichi Sky Expo in Tokoname in Aichi Prefecture, Japan from 25 to 27 September 2026.

The Pokémon Unite was introduced to the esports event of the Asian Games for the first time in this edition. It is a multiplayer online battle arena game where two teams of five Pokémon compete against each other.

== Rosters ==
Chinese Taipei	Hong Kong	India	Indonesia
Liu Ting-Yi; Chin Yung-Chi; Kuo Yi-Shuo; Hu Hsin-Jui; Chen Yi-Tien; Liu Hsiang	Chan Cheuk Kit; Chan Kam Tung; Justin Chan; Loo Kin Shing; Pang Ka Kit; Rico Tsui	Adnan Mohammed Badshah; Deepkumar Vipulbhai Patel; Sai Krishna Nalluri; Dipjyoti Laxman Nath; Rudra Narayan Nayak; Reuben Fernandes	Deni Ardiyanto; Novrizal Diananta Said; Marcello Hillers; GM Judha Raja Panggabean; Muhammad Haika Irawan
Japan	Kazakhstan	Malaysia	Philippines
Hiroki Sato; Shouki Takada; Mashika Shirakawa; Koto Toba; Renta Higashi; Yudai Koseko	Igor Aleshko; Tamerlan Amanzhanov; Azamat Kadyr; Dmitriy Narozhnev; Sardar Yerekenov; Rafa Berdaly	Chan Derek Cheong Kei; Chye Lik Hen; Lam Darren Chun Kit; Lam Wei Heng; Ng Zun Shen; Ng Zun Yang	Lance David; Ducke Harnold Leoncio; Lawrence Anthony Gatmaitan; Kim Rey Salazar; Robert Jon Mempin; Michael Vaughn Ocio
Singapore	South Korea	United Arab Emirates	
Wayne Chua; Travis Fong; Tay Leong Jie; Chuang Fu Yuan; Bryan Khoo; Freddy Lim	Park Sung-soon; Cho Min-hyeok; Jin Su-been; Kim Jae-young; Lee Jih-wan	Withdrew	

== Group stage ==
=== Group A ===
Pos	Team	Pld	W	L	GF	GA	GD	Qualification
1	Philippines	2	2	0	4	0	+4	Advance to Semifinals
2	Chinese Taipei	3	2	1	4	2	+2	Advance to Semifinals
3	Malaysia	3	1	2	2	4	−2	Advance to Semifinals
4	Kazakhstan	2	0	2	0	4	−4	

Source: Asian Games 2026

Date	Time		Score		Set 1	Set 2	Set 3
25 September	12:50	Philippines	Forfeit	Kazakhstan	DNS		
25 September	14:15	Chinese Taipei	2–0	Malaysia	1–0	1–0	—N/a
26 September	10:00	Philippines	2–0	Chinese Taipei	1–0	1–0	—N/a
26 September	11:25	Kazakhstan	0–2	Malaysia	0–2	0–2	—N/a
26 September	15:40	Philippines	2–0	Malaysia	1–0	1–0	—N/a
26 September	17:05	Kazakhstan	0–2	Chinese Taipei	0–2	0–2	—N/a

The Philippines versus Kazakhstan game was declared a forfeit after both teams did not appear at the designated time. However, there is also reports that the forfeit was caused by an undisclosed uniform-related violation.

=== Group B ===
Pos	Team	Pld	W	L	GF	GA	GD	Qualification
1	Indonesia	2	2	0	4	2	+2	Advance to Quarterfinals
2	Singapore	2	1	1	3	2	+1	Advance to Quarterfinals
3	Hong Kong	2	0	2	1	4	−3	Advance to Last Selection playoff

Source: Asian Games 2026

Date	Time		Score		Set 1	Set 2	Set 3
25 September	10:00	Singapore	2–0	Hong Kong	1–0	1–0	—N/a
25 September	15:40	Hong Kong	1–2	Indonesia	1–0	0–1	0–1
26 September	12:50	Singapore	1–2	Indonesia	1–0	0–1	0–1

=== Group C ===
Pos	Team	Pld	W	L	GF	GA	GD	Qualification
1	Japan (H)	2	2	0	4	1	+3	Advance to Quarterfinals
2	South Korea	2	1	1	3	2	+1	Advance to Quarterfinals
3	India	2	0	2	0	4	−4	Advance to Last Selection playoff

Source: Asian Games 2026
(H) Hosts

Date	Time		Score		Set 1	Set 2	Set 3
25 September	11:25	India	0–2	South Korea	0–1	0–1	—N/a
25 September	17:05	South Korea	1–2	Japan	1–0	0–1	0–1
26 September	14:15	India	0–2	Japan	0–1	0–1	—N/a

=== Group Stage Last Selection ===
The third place teams in Group A and C played against each other for the final quarterfinals berth.

Date	Time		Score		Set 1	Set 2	Set 3
26 September	18:30	Hong Kong	2–1	India	1–0	0–1	1–0

Source: Asian Games 2026

== Knockout stage ==
Knock-out stage games are a best of three, except the finals which followed a best of five format.

Quarterfinals
B2	Singapore	1
C2	South Korea	2
C1	Japan	2
A2	Chinese Taipei	0
B1	Indonesia	2
A3	Malaysia	0
A1	Philippines	2
LS	Hong Kong	0

Semifinals
A1	South Korea	0
B1	Japan	2
B1	Indonesia	2
D1	Philippines	0

Finals
C1	Japan	3
B1	Indonesia	1

Source: Asian Games 2026

=== Quarterfinals ===
Date	Time		Score		Set 1	Set 2	Set 3
27 September	9:00	Singapore	1–2	South Korea	1–0	0–1	0–1
27 September	10:25	Japan	2–0	South Korea	1–0	1–0	—N/a
27 September	11:50	Indonesia	2–0	Malaysia	1–0	1–0	—N/a
27 September	13:15	Philippines	2–0	Hong Kong	1–0	1–0	—N/a

=== Semifinals ===
Date	Time		Score		Set 1	Set 2	Set 3
27 September	14:40	South Korea	0–2	Japan	0–1	0–1	—N/a
27 September	16:05	Indonesia	2–0	Philippines	1–0	1–0	—N/a

=== Finals ===
Date	Time		Score		Set 1	Set 2	Set 3	Set 4	Set 5
27 September	17:30	Japan	3–1	Indonesia	0–1	1–0	1–0	1–0	—N/a
