= Esports at the 2026 Asian Games – Naraka: Bladepoint =

Naraka: Bladepoint at the 2026 Asian Games
- Venues: Aichi Sky Expo
- Dates: 23–24 September 2026
- Competitors: 38 from 8 nations

Medalists
gold medal	China
silver medal	Thailand
bronze medal	Chinese Taipei
bronze medal	Vietnam

The Naraka: Bladepoint tournament at the 2026 Asian Games was held at the Aichi Sky Expo in Tokoname in Aichi Prefecture, Japan from 22 to 23 September 2026.

The Naraka: Bladepoint was introduced to the esports event of the Asian Games for the first time in this edition.

The competition follows the Martial Artist mode, rather than the Battle Royale mode typically used in Naraka tournaments.

China won the first ever Naraka: Bladepoint gold medal.

== Qualification ==
The qualification tournament was held at Resorts World Sentosa in Singapore, from 4 to 5 June 2026. Fifteen teams were divided into three groups and competed in a round-robin format, the top two teams from each group earned qualification to the Asian Games. The third and fourth-placed teams advanced to a second-round decider to determine the last two teams. All matches were played in the "Martial Artist Duel · Competition" in a best-of-three series.

=== Qualified teams ===
	Group A	Group B	Group C
Qualified teams as top teams	Chinese Taipei; Indonesia	China; Philippines	Vietnam; Thailand
Qualified teams as second round winners	Hong Kong		Malaysia
Eliminated teams	Kazakhstan; Sri Lanka	Laos; Singapore; Tajikistan	Mongolia; Kyrgyzstan

== Rosters ==
China	Chinese Taipei	Hong Kong	Indonesia
Xu Kunbin; Sui Xiangyun; Wang Tongrong; Tan Xujie; Wang Feng	Liu Tang-shiun; Yen Kai-en; Chen Shang-yi; Yeh Chih-yu; Cheng Hsu-yu	Wong Fanny Fung Ching; Wong Yu Hin; Wang Mingjie; Lam Kwun Wang Kevin; Chan Chun Kit	Moch Afthon Fathony; Natha Dhiva Arya Kusuma; Darian Wicaksana Setyawan; Ararat Samuel Manullang
Malaysia	Philippines	Thailand	Vietnam
Chang Ming Hao; Tuan Abdullah Tuan Ab Rashid; Cheong Eu Joon; Chan Boon Chong; Tan Chun Chung	Ouhric Von Tenoso; Richard Espejo; Raphaelron Joaquin Paclibar; Kenneth Perez	Sahawat Phonngam; Nopparat Pidkwamlab; Kevin Lemoine; Wachirawut Changsoi; Jongrak Kampangkaew	Trần Công Tinh; Lại Nguyễn Anh Khoa; Hồng Phát; Văn Phúc An Khang; Diệp Chí Hiếu

Source: Asian Games 2026

== Group stage ==
=== Group A ===
Pos	Team	Pld	W	L	GF	GA	GD	Qualification
1	China	3	3	0	12	2	+10	Advance to Semifinals
2	Thailand	3	2	1	9	6	+3	Advance to Semifinals
3	Indonesia	3	1	2	7	8	−1	
4	Malaysia	3	0	3	0	12	−12	

Source: Asian Games 2026

Date	Time		Score		Set 1	Set 2	Set 3
23 September	9:00	Thailand	2–0	Malaysia	2–0	2–0	—N/a
23 September	9:00	Indonesia	0–2	China	1–2	0–2	—N/a
23 September	10:30	Thailand	2–0	Indonesia	2–1	2–1	—N/a
23 September	10:30	Malaysia	0–2	China	0–2	0–2	—N/a
23 September	12:00	Thailand	0–2	China	1–2	0–2	—N/a
23 September	12:00	Malaysia	0–2	Indonesia	0–2	0–2	—N/a

=== Group B ===
Pos	Team	Pld	W	L	GF	GA	GD	Qualification
1	Vietnam	3	3	0	12	0	+12	Advance to Semifinals
2	Chinese Taipei	3	2	1	8	4	+4	Advance to Semifinals
3	Philippines	3	1	2	5	11	−6	
4	Hong Kong	3	0	3	3	13	−10	

Source: Asian Games 2026

Date	Time		Score		Set 1	Set 2	Set 3
23 September	15:00	Hong Kong	0–2	Vietnam	0–2	0–2	—N/a
23 September	15:00	Chinese Taipei	2–0	Philippines	2–0	2–0	—N/a
23 September	16:30	Hong Kong	0–2	Chinese Taipei	0–2	0–2	—N/a
23 September	16:30	Vietnam	2–0	Philippines	2–0	2–0	—N/a
23 September	18:00	Hong Kong	1–2	Philippines	0–2	2–1	1–2
23 September	18:00	Vietnam	2–0	Chinese Taipei	2–0	2–0	—N/a

== Knockout stage ==
Best-of-five series. Semifinals losers were awarded bronze medals.

Semifinals
China	3
Chinese Taipei	0
Vietnam	2
Thailand	3

Finals
China	2
Thailand	1

Source: Asian Games 2026

=== Semifinals ===
Date	Time		Score		Set 1	Set 2	Set 3	Set 4	Set 5	Report
24 September	10:00	China	3–0	Chinese Taipei	2–0	2–0	2–1	—N/a	—N/a	Report
24 September	13:00	Vietnam	2–3	Thailand	0–2	2–1	0–2	2–0	1–2	Report

=== Finals ===
Date	Time		Score		Set 1	Set 2	Set 3	Set 4	Set 5	Report
24 September	17:00	China	2–1	Thailand	2–1	2–0	2–1	—N/a	—N/a	Report

== Final standings ==
Rank	Team
1st place, gold medalist(s)	China
2nd place, silver medalist(s)	Thailand
3rd place, bronze medalist(s)	Chinese Taipei
3rd place, bronze medalist(s)	Vietnam
5	Hong Kong
5	Indonesia
5	Malaysia
5	Philippines
