= Yuki Kurihara =

Japanese esports player

Personal information
- Born: 18 June 2015 (age 11) Bunkyō, Tokyo, Japan
- Occupation: Esports player
Medal record
Representing Japan
Asian Games
Gold medal – first place	2026 Aichi-Nagoya	Puyo Puyo Champions

Yuki Kurihara (Japanese: 栗原 悠輝, born 18 June 2015), also known by his player name Yuuki, is a Japanese esports player who competes in the puzzle game Puyo Puyo. He represents Tokyo Verdy eSports. In 2026, at the age of 11, he won the gold medal in Puyo Puyo Champions at the 2026 Asian Games in Aichi-Nagoya, becoming the youngest gold medalist in Asian Games history.

== Career ==
Kurihara began playing Puyo Puyo during his first year of elementary school. He quickly began participating in competitions and rose through Japan's competitive Puyo Puyo scene at a young age. He qualified to represent Japan at the 2026 Asian Games after winning the Japanese national selection competition in March 2026. He obtained his professional esports licence in April 2026 and joined Tokyo Verdy eSports.

At the 2026 Asian Games in Aichi-Nagoya, Kurihara competed in the Puyo Puyo Champions event. He won all four of his group-stage matches to finish first in his group. In the knockout stage, he defeated Singapore's Justine Koh Mun June in the quarter-finals and Thailand's Tanarak Wongkitkun 10–1 in the semi-finals.

In the final, Kurihara defeated South Korea's Kang Dongshin 10–2 after initially losing the opening set. He won five consecutive sets to take control of the match and secured the gold medal on home soil. His victory made him the youngest gold medalist in the history of the Asian Games.
