= Esports at the 2026 Asian Games – PUBG Mobile =

PUBG Mobile at the 2026 Asian Games
- Venues: Aichi Sky Expo
- Dates: 28–29 September 2026
- Competitors: 59 from 12 nations

Medalists
gold medal	Thailand; Nuttawut Muensa, Sathit Thanormchit, Supachai Singkaew, Pawarit Wongthonghatsachai, Phumrapee Wannalertsakul
silver medal	China; He Jianghong, He Ruibo, Chen Yumeng, Liu Jinshan, Li Haokui
bronze medal	Pakistan; Shayan Asad, Muhammad Huzaifa, Falak Sher Memon, Hasnain Rahman, Syed Sameer

The PUBG Mobile tournament at the 2026 Asian Games was held at the Aichi Sky Expo in Tokoname in Aichi Prefecture, Japan from 28 to 29 September 2026.

This was a team tournament with each team featuring five players. Each team played 12 matches across the two days, six on 28 September and six on 29 September.

Team Thailand won the gold medal with People's Republic of China and Pakistan winning the silver medal and bronze medal, respectively.

== Qualification ==
The qualification tournament was held in Ho Chi Minh City, Vietnam, from 19 to 21 June 2026. Twenty-three teams took part and competed for eight berths in the main tournament, which were secured by Indonesia, Jordan, Malaysia, Myanmar, Pakistan, Thailand, Uzbekistan and Vietnam; Pakistan finished top of the qualification standings. They joined the three medalists of the 2022 Asian Games – China, South Korea and Chinese Taipei – and hosts Japan.

== Rosters ==
China	Indonesia	Jordan	Japan
Chen Yumeng; He Jianghong; He Ruibo; Li Haokui; Liu Jinshan	Fazriel Haikal Aditya; Juventino Ryan Jeremy Rolos; Sharfan Syahman Shodiq; Muh Fathyn Zilhaq Syah; Micho Ananda Pratama Wijaya	Mohammad Aladdasi; Omar Aldeeb; Haitham Almasri; Laith Mheidat; Omar Seif	Touma Adachi; Tomoki Ishikawa; Daisuke Ohashi; Tessen Shoda; Eigo Tagashira
South Korea	Malaysia	Myanmar	Pakistan
Jeon Hyeon-bin; Jeoung Yu-chan; Kim Jun-ha; Park Sang-cheol; Song Su-an	Muhammad Luqman Hakim Hasan; Muhammad Hazim Irfan Kamarudin; Mohamad Rezza Shah Mohd Azmi; Muhammad Faliq Fitri Mohd Faizul; Muhammad Nor Azmie Nazrie	Oo Aung Soe; Aung Kaung Khant; Hein Khant Zaw; Phyo Soung Wai; Maung Swam Wint	Shayan Asad; Muhammad Huzaifa; Falak Sher Memon; Hasnain Rahman; Syed Sameer
Thailand	Chinese Taipei	Uzbekistan	Vietnam
Nuttawut Muensa; Supachai Singkaew; Sathit Thanormchit; Phumrapee Wannalertsakul; Pawarit Wongthonghatsachai	Chen Hong-yi; Chen Ting-yi; Chiang Chien-ting; Huang Chuan-peng; Peng Yi-xiang	Alikhon Badriddinov; Mukhammadali Botirov; Khamidulla Rustamov; Emil Yarkovoy	Nguyễn Anh Quân; Nguyễn Ngọc Thiện; Phạm Văn Hiếu; Phạm Văn Trung; Võ Minh Thắng

== Format ==
Match Scoring Points Distribution
Place	Points
1st	10
2nd	6
3rd	5
4th	4
5th	3
6th	2
7th - 8th	1
9th - 12th	0
Elimination Points
1 point per elimination
Tiebreaker Rules
Ties are broken in the following order: 1. Total number of WWCDs across all matches.; 2. Total number of Placement Points across all matches.; 3. Total number of Elimination Points across all matches.; 4. The best Placement Ranking in the most recent match.

== Results ==
Rank	Team	Day 1						Day 2						WWCD	Total
Rank	Team	M1	M2	M3	M4	M5	M6	M7	M8	M9	M10	M11	M12	WWCD	Total
1st place, gold medalist(s)	Thailand	5	17	3	14	13	23	8	21	0	7	14	3	3	128
2nd place, silver medalist(s)	China	20	15	11	7	5	3	12	5	10	4	5	17	2	114
3rd place, bronze medalist(s)	Pakistan	4	16	0	1	10	8	16	10	10	6	12	7	0	100
4.	Vietnam	2	1	15	15	17	1	2	8	19	1	5	9	2	95
5.	Indonesia	9	9	18	3	7	9	7	5	1	23	2	2	2	95
6.	South Korea	9	2	4	3	7	13	16	0	1	7	5	4	1	71
7.	Chinese Taipei	5	2	4	5	6	6	1	7	3	1	6	16	0	62
8.	Jordan	2	1	5	3	0	0	6	11	22	7	0	4	1	61
9.	Japan	11	6	4	1	4	8	1	0	3	0	18	3	1	59
10.	Malaysia	2	3	4	3	1	2	4	7	0	12	7	2	0	47
11.	Uzbekistan	3	4	4	12	2	0	3	0	4	9	1	1	0	43
12.	Myanmar	0	0	5	8	1	3	1	1	0	1	0	8	0	28
Source:Asian Games 2026

=== Day 1 ===
Rank	Team	M1			M2			M3			M4			M5			M6			Total
Rank	Team	P	E	W	P	E	W	P	E	W	P	E	W	P	E	W	P	E	W	Total
1	Thailand	2	3	–	10	7	Yes	0	3	–	6	8	–	6	7	–	10	13	Yes	75
2	China	10	10	Yes	5	10	–	6	5	–	5	2	–	0	5	–	3	0	–	61
3	Indonesia	4	5	–	1	8	–	10	8	Yes	1	2	–	1	6	–	2	7	–	55
4	Vietnam	1	1	–	0	1	–	5	10	–	10	5	Yes	10	7	Yes	0	1	–	51
5	Pakistan	1	3	–	6	10	–	0	0	–	0	1	–	5	5	–	4	4	–	39
6	South Korea	5	4	–	0	2	–	0	4	–	1	2	–	3	4	–	6	7	–	38
7	Japan	6	5	–	3	3	–	0	4	–	0	1	–	2	2	–	5	3	–	34
8	Chinese Taipei	3	2	–	2	0	–	1	3	–	0	5	–	4	2	–	1	5	–	28
9	Uzbekistan	0	3	–	4	0	–	2	2	–	4	8	–	0	2	–	0	0	–	25
10	Myanmar	0	0	–	0	0	–	3	2	–	3	5	–	1	0	–	1	2	–	17
11	Malaysia	0	2	–	0	3	–	1	3	–	2	1	–	0	1	–	0	2	–	15
12	Jordan	0	2	–	1	0	–	4	1	–	0	3	–	0	0	–	0	0	–	11

=== Day 2 ===
Rank	Team	M7			M8			M9			M10			M11			M12			Total
Rank	Team	P	E	W	P	E	W	P	E	W	P	E	W	P	E	W	P	E	W	Total
1	Pakistan	5	11	–	3	7	–	3	7	–	0	6	–	4	8	–	0	7	–	61
2	Thailand	1	7	–	10	11	Yes	0	0	–	2	5	–	5	9	–	1	2	–	53
3	China	6	6	–	1	4	–	6	4	–	3	1	–	1	4	–	10	7	Yes	53
4	Jordan	4	2	–	6	5	–	10	12	Yes	5	2	–	0	0	–	0	4	–	50
5	Vietnam	0	2	–	2	6	–	5	14	–	1	0	–	2	3	–	6	3	–	44
6	Indonesia	3	4	–	0	5	–	0	1	–	10	13	Yes	0	2	–	2	0	–	40
7	Chinese Taipei	0	1	–	4	3	–	1	2	–	0	1	–	3	3	–	5	11	–	34
8	South Korea	10	6	Yes	0	0	–	1	0	–	4	3	–	1	4	–	4	0	–	33
9	Malaysia	1	3	–	5	2	–	0	0	–	6	6	–	6	1	–	0	2	–	32
10	Japan	0	1	–	0	0	–	2	1	–	0	0	–	10	8	Yes	1	2	–	25
11	Uzbekistan	2	1	–	0	0	–	4	0	–	1	8	–	0	1	–	0	1	–	18
12	Myanmar	0	1	–	1	0	–	0	0	–	0	1	–	0	0	–	3	5	–	11
