= Esports at the 2026 Asian Games – Identity V =

Identity V at the 2026 Asian Games
- Dates: 28–30 September 2026
- Competitors: 67 from 10 nations

Medalists
gold medal	China
silver medal	Japan
bronze medal	Malaysia
bronze medal	Chinese Taipei

The Identity V tournament at the 2026 Asian Games was held at the Aichi Sky Expo in Tokoname, Aichi Prefecture, Japan, from 28 to 30 September 2026.

This was the first time that an asymmetrical competitive game was contested as a medal event at a continental multi-sport event.

China won the gold medal, defeating Japan 2–0 in the final. Mu Xinyue became the first female athlete to win an esports gold medal at the Asian Games.

== Qualification ==
The qualification tournament was held at Resorts World Sentosa in Singapore, from 30 May to 1 June 2026. Sixteen teams were divided into three groups and played a single round-robin, with all matches played as best-of-three; the top three teams from each group advanced to the main tournament.

Teams with a perfect record, or the group winners in the absence of an unbeaten team, entered a seeding round-robin; its winner advanced to the main tournament as the best-performing team. China won the seeding matches and joined host nation Japan, which had secured direct qualification, in receiving a bye to the knockout stage.

== Format ==
The tournament was played in the Asian Games version of Identity V. Ten teams took part: eight teams were drawn into two groups of four and played a single round-robin, with the top three teams from each group advancing to the knockout stage, where they were joined by China and Japan. The knockout stage was a single-elimination bracket contested by eight teams. Matches in the group stage and the quarterfinals and semifinals were played as best-of-three, while the final was played as best-of-five.

Each match was contested over a series of rounds; in every round each team played once as the Survivors and once as the Hunters, and the team with the higher combined score won the round.

== Rosters ==
China	Hong Kong	Indonesia	Japan
Chen Mingming; Fan Siqi; Lu Shujia; Lu Yahui; Shi Xiangwei; Sun Le; Mu Xinyue	Chan Pan Yuen; Lai Kau Ming; Li Tak Cheung; Tsoi Ka Po; Tsui Chi Kan; Wu Tsun Wai; Fan Hoi Ching	Daffa Pasha Arifin; Muhammad Fachrul Putra Henri; Suhartanto Ardi Mulyo; Athif Fatahilah Nursyam	Yuto Awata; Ryo Kamiya; Masumi Konuma; Kentaro Maeda; Ryuhi Oyama; Masahiro Uemura; Masaki Uenaka
South Korea	Malaysia	Philippines	Thailand
Euh Hong; Hong Hyeon-gi; Kim Jae-yeon; Kim Jun-seo; Kim Sang-min; Ko Tae-hyun; Park So-yeon	Cheah Euggee; Chin George Shan Yuan; Gan Hong Ming; Ho Nicky Jun Hong; Ng Wei Hao; Yiau Wen Feng; Yii Vincent Kai Liang	Psalm David Cortez; Sander Joseph Creed Gallo; Joshua Francis Gumaro; Johannes Glenn Juico; Xyrel Terrence Julian; Japhet Jay Onquit; Joachim Santino Timtiman	Panachai Aruntanavong; Tachin Danchoho; Anusorn Karaket; Tinnapop Malai; Natchanon Rueangwettiwong; Varit Tangpong; Chuapong Wachirametharuch
Chinese Taipei	Vietnam		
Chang Chun-ming; Chen Kuang-yeh; Cheng Kai-sheng; Chu Tang-yao; Chuang Po-chun; Su Bin-cheng; Tang Sheng-chun	Bùi Mạnh Nguyên; Nguyễn Hoàng Hữu Tình; Nguyễn Liêu Tuấn Hưng; Nguyễn Việt Thành; Phạm Hà Lâm; Quách Võ Anh Minh; Trần Quang Đăng		

== Group stage ==
=== Group A ===
Pos	Team	Pld	W	L	GF	GA	GD	Qualification
1	Chinese Taipei	3	3	0	6	1	+5	Advance to knockout stage
2	Thailand	3	2	1	5	2	+3	Advance to knockout stage
3	Philippines	3	1	2	2	5	−3	Advance to knockout stage
4	Indonesia	3	0	3	1	6	−5	

Source: Asian Games 2026

Date	Time		Score		Round 1	Round 2	Round 3
28 September	9:00	Philippines	0–2	Thailand	1–8	1–8	—N/a
28 September	9:00	Chinese Taipei	2–0	Indonesia	8–1	7–2	—N/a
28 September	10:30	Philippines	0–2	Chinese Taipei	0–10	1–8	—N/a
28 September	10:30	Thailand	2–0	Indonesia	7–2	6–2	—N/a
29 September	9:00	Philippines	2–1	Indonesia	3–5	5–3	7–2
29 September	10:30	Thailand	1–2	Chinese Taipei	5–3	2–7	1–8

=== Group B ===
Pos	Team	Pld	W	L	GF	GA	GD	Qualification
1	Malaysia	3	3	0	5	0	+5	Advance to knockout stage
2	South Korea	3	2	1	3	4	−1	Advance to knockout stage
3	Hong Kong	3	1	2	3	3	0	Advance to knockout stage
4	Vietnam	3	0	3	1	5	−4	

Source: Asian Games 2026

Date	Time		Score		Round 1	Round 2	Round 3
28 September	12:00	Hong Kong	2–0	Vietnam	4–4	7–2	6–3
28 September	12:00	Malaysia	2–0	South Korea	8–1	7–2	—N/a
28 September	13:30	Hong Kong	0–1	Malaysia	4–4	2–7	4–4
28 September	13:30	Vietnam	1–1	South Korea	5–3	5–5	1–8
29 September	12:00	Hong Kong	1–2	South Korea	5–3	0–2	3–5
29 September	13:30	Vietnam	0–2	Malaysia	3–5	2–7	—N/a

== Knockout stage ==
Quarterfinals
Japan	2
A2	Thailand	0
B1	Malaysia	2
A3	Philippines	0
A1	Chinese Taipei	2
B3	Hong Kong	0
B2	South Korea	0
China	2

Semifinals
Japan	2
B1	Malaysia	0
A1	Chinese Taipei	0
China	2

Finals
Japan	0
China	2

=== Quarterfinals ===
Date	Time		Score		Round 1	Round 2	Round 3
30 September	9:00	Japan	2–0	Thailand	7–2	7–2	—N/a
30 September	9:00	Malaysia	2–0	Philippines	8–1	8–1	—N/a
30 September	10:30	Chinese Taipei	2–0	Hong Kong	4–4	6–2	5–3
30 September	10:30	South Korea	0–2	China	3–5	1–8	—N/a

=== Semifinals ===
Date	Time		Score		Round 1	Round 2	Round 3
30 September	14:00	Japan	2–0	Malaysia	5–3	4–4	8–1
30 September	16:00	Chinese Taipei	0–2	China	2–7	2–7	—N/a

=== Final ===
Date	Time		Score		Round 1	Round 2	Round 3	Round 4	Round 5
30 September	18:00	Japan	0–2	China	4–4	5–5	2–7	4–4	1–3

== External Link ==
- Results Book
