= Esports at the 2026 Asian Games – Honor of Kings =

Honor of Kings at the 2026 Asian Games
- Dates: 27–28 September 2026
- Competitors: 58 from 10 nations

Medalists
gold medal	China
silver medal	Malaysia
bronze medal	Hong Kong
bronze medal	Philippines

The Honor of Kings tournament at the 2026 Asian Games was held at the Aichi Sky Expo in Tokoname, Aichi Prefecture, Japan, from 27 to 28 September 2026.

China won the gold medal, defeating Malaysia 4–0 in the final, and did not lose a single game in the whole tournament.

== Qualification ==
The qualification tournament was held at the Petaling Jaya Marriott Hotel in Petaling Jaya, Malaysia, from 13 to 21 June 2026. Twenty teams competed for nine berths in the main tournament, joining the three medalists of the Arena of Valor tournament at the 2022 Asian Games.

== Format ==
The tournament was played in the Asian Games version of Honor of Kings. Ten teams were drawn into four groups, with Groups A and B containing three teams each and Groups C and D containing two teams each. Teams played a single round-robin within their group, and the top two teams from each group advanced to the knockout stage. The knockout stage was a single-elimination bracket contested by eight teams, with the quarterfinals and semifinals played as best-of-three matches and the final played as a best-of-seven match.

== Rosters ==
China	Hong Kong	Indonesia	Kazakhstan
He Weijia; Huang Yaoqin; Meng Jiajun; Wang Ke; Xu Bicheng; Zhao Haoyu	Cheng Ka Hin; Chui Sum Ki; Deng Xin Zhan; Kong Tsz Kin; Kwok Ho Wa; Li Ka Hing	Drensen; Neville Garrick; Iqbal Khan; Muh Naufal Aushaf Mahfuzh; Emanuel Hendo Paska; Agung Budi Prasetyo	Amantay Akhmetov; Bakzhol Alinur; Arshin Jenisbek; Alikhan Madibekov; Marapat Maksat; Sungkar Zhumakan
South Korea	Laos	Malaysia	Myanmar
Han Ji-hoon; Han Seong-geon; Jo Seong-bin; Jung Yun-ho; Lee Hun-min; Lee Seop-gyu	Khampeng Banluesack; Veelakone Inthilad; Phokham Korsaphankham; Sahalath Oulakone; Soutthixay Saniseng	Chen Tat Yann; Chong Han Hui; Lee Han Siang; Lim Chee Hong; Na Ryan Jie Rong; Ng Nicholas Khai Shuan	Myat Eant Htoo; Maw Min Khant Aung; Phyo Sai Aung Pyae; Hein Sai Boon Lyaung; Htet Zin Min
Philippines	Thailand		
Dragon Hart Dajao; Golden Hart Dajao; Charles Roman Esguerra; Chammy Paul Nazarrea; Justine Ritchie Tan; Jhon Mike Tungol	Akkarapon Amnuayphon; Kantinun Asawarungsaengkul; Weeravat Baolorphet; Prasitthichai Jiadchat; Piyaphong Parwthaisong; Ratchakit Wanasiriporn		

== Group stage ==
=== Group A ===
Pos	Team	Pld	W	L	GF	GA	GD	Qualification
1	Hong Kong	2	2	0	4	0	+4	Advance to knockout stage
2	Indonesia	2	1	1	2	2	0	Advance to knockout stage
3	Thailand	2	0	2	0	4	−4	

Source: Asian Games 2026

Date	Time		Score		Set 1	Set 2	Set 3
27 September	9:00	Indonesia	2–0	Thailand	1–0	1–0	—N/a
27 September	11:00	Thailand	0–2	Hong Kong	0–1	0–1	—N/a
27 September	13:00	Indonesia	0–2	Hong Kong	0–1	0–1	—N/a

=== Group B ===
Pos	Team	Pld	W	L	GF	GA	GD	Qualification
1	Malaysia	2	2	0	4	1	+3	Advance to knockout stage
2	Philippines	2	1	1	3	2	+1	Advance to knockout stage
3	Kazakhstan	2	0	2	0	4	−4	

Source: Asian Games 2026

Date	Time		Score		Set 1	Set 2	Set 3
27 September	9:00	Philippines	2–0	Kazakhstan	1–0	1–0	—N/a
27 September	11:00	Kazakhstan	0–2	Malaysia	0–1	0–1	—N/a
27 September	13:00	Philippines	1–2	Malaysia	1–0	0–1	0–1

=== Group C ===
Pos	Team	Pld	W	L	GF	GA	GD	Qualification
1	South Korea	1	1	0	2	0	+2	Advance to knockout stage
2	Myanmar	1	0	1	0	2	−2	Advance to knockout stage

Source: Asian Games 2026

Date	Time		Score		Set 1	Set 2	Set 3
27 September	9:00	Myanmar	0–2	South Korea	0–1	0–1	—N/a

=== Group D ===
Pos	Team	Pld	W	L	GF	GA	GD	Qualification
1	China	1	1	0	2	0	+2	Advance to knockout stage
2	Laos	1	0	1	0	2	−2	Advance to knockout stage

Source: Asian Games 2026

Date	Time		Score		Set 1	Set 2	Set 3
27 September	11:00	China	2–0	Laos	1–0	1–0	—N/a

== Knockout stage ==
Quarterfinals
A1	Hong Kong	2
D2	Laos	0
B1	Malaysia	2
C2	Myanmar	0
C1	South Korea	0
B2	Philippines	2
D1	China	2
A2	Indonesia	0

Semifinals
A1	Hong Kong	0
B1	Malaysia	2
B2	Philippines	0
D1	China	2

Finals
B1	Malaysia	0
D1	China	4

=== Quarterfinals ===
Date	Time		Score		Set 1	Set 2	Set 3
27 September	17:00	Hong Kong	2–0	Laos	1–0	1–0	—N/a
27 September	17:00	Malaysia	2–0	Myanmar	1–0	1–0	—N/a
27 September	17:00	South Korea	0–2	Philippines	0–1	0–1	—N/a
27 September	17:00	China	2–0	Indonesia	1–0	1–0	—N/a

=== Semifinals ===
Date	Time		Score		Set 1	Set 2	Set 3
28 September	9:00	Hong Kong	0–2	Malaysia	0–1	0–1	—N/a
28 September	11:00	Philippines	0–2	China	0–1	0–1	—N/a

=== Final ===
Date	Time		Score		Set 1	Set 2	Set 3	Set 4	Set 5	Set 6	Set 7
28 September	14:00	Malaysia	0–4	China	0–1	0–1	0–1	0–1	—N/a		

== External Link ==
- Results Book
