= Esports at the 2026 Asian Games – eFootball =

eFootball at the 2026 Asian Games
- Venues: Aichi Sky Expo
- Dates: 22–23 September 2026
- Competitors: 38 from 19 nations

Medalists
gold medal	Hassan Pajani / Abolfazl Aghaeinasab (IRI)
silver medal	Farish Luzman / Muhammad Hariz Hazmi Hakimin (MAS)
bronze medal	Ekuya Kida / Yuga Chatani (JPN)
bronze medal	Abubakir Iminjonov / Farrukh Mirkhamitov (UZB)

The eFootball tournament at the 2026 Asian Games was held at the Aichi Sky Expo in Tokoname in Aichi Prefecture, Japan from 22 to 23 September 2026.

This is a team tournament with two players; one PC player, and the second being a mobile player. PC games were held in ten minutes, while mobile games were held in six minutes.

Hassan Pajani and Abolfazl Aghaeinasab of Iran won the eFootball tournament.

== Players ==
NOC	Players
Bahrain	Mohammed Hejairi, Fadhel Abdali
Hong Kong	Jeffrey Chan, Chen Hongsen
India	Daniel Patel, Chinmay Sahoo
Indonesia	Radinka Wiratama, Rizky Faidan
Iran	Hassan Pajani, Abolfazl Aghaeinasab
Japan	Ekuya Kida, Yuga Chatani
Jordan	Sief Addeen Dababneh, Wissam Al Oweisat
Kazakhstan	Kanysh Abykenov, Nurbakyt Mirgali
Kyrgyzstan	Dastan Estebesov, Mukhammadaziz Mukhtarzhanov
Palestine	Hassan Aljuneidi, Osayd Shakhdam
Qatar	Hassan Al-Qadi, Mohammed Almas Al-Ahmad
Malaysia	Luzman Farish, Muhammad Hariz Hazmi Hakimin
Mongolia	Munkh-Ochir Batmanlai, Khantamir Munkh-Orgil
Myanmar	Wai Phyo Kyaw, Min Thant Naing
Saudi Arabia	Amjad Othman M. Alqarni, Abdulaziz Falah D. Aljohani
South Korea	Song Young-woo, Kim Dok-yum
Tajikistan	Shahzod Safarzoda, Firdavs Safolov
Thailand	Teerat Limprapat, Sirawut Rungratkasikul
Uzbekistan	Abubakir Iminjonov, Farrukh Mirkhamitov

== Group stage ==
=== Group A ===
Pos	Team	Pld	W	L	GF	GA	GD	Qualification
1	Iran	3	3	0	5	0	+5	Advance to Quarterfinals
2	Saudi Arabia	3	2	1	4	2	+2	Advance to Quarterfinals
3	South Korea	3	1	2	0	3	−3	
4	Qatar	3	0	3	0	4	−4	

Source: Asian Games 2026

Date	Time		Match result		Games		Players
22 September	9:00	Qatar	N/A	South Korea	DNS	DNS	Start list
22 September	9:00	Saudi Arabia	0–2	Iran	0–1	0–1	Start list
22 September	11:30	Qatar	0–2	Saudi Arabia	0–1	0–1	Start list
22 September	11:30	South Korea	0–1	Iran	0–0	0–1	Start list
22 September	15:00	Qatar	0–2	Iran	0–1	0–1	Start list
22 September	15:00	South Korea	0–2	Saudi Arabia	0–1	0–1	Start list

=== Group B ===
Pos	Team	Pld	W	L	GF	GA	GD	Qualification
1	Japan (H)	1	1	0	2	0	+2	Advance to Quarterfinals
2	Thailand	1	1	0	2	0	+2	Advance to Quarterfinals
3	Palestine	2	0	2	0	4	−4	

Source: Asian Games 2026
(H) Hosts

Date	Time		Match result		Games		Players
22 September	9:00	Thailand	2–0	Palestine	1–0	1–0	Start list
22 September	15:00	Palestine	0–2	Japan	0–1	0–1	Start list
22 September	17:30	Thailand	0–0	Japan	0–0	0–0	Start list

=== Group C ===
Pos	Team	Pld	W	L	GF	GA	GD	Qualification
1	Indonesia	2	2	0	4	0	+4	Advance to Quarterfinals
2	Hong Kong	2	1	1	1	2	−1	
3	Kyrgyzstan	2	0	2	0	3	−3	

Source: Asian Games 2026

Date	Time		Match result		Games		Players
22 September	9:00	Indonesia	2–0	Kyrgyzstan	1–0	1–0	Start list
22 September	11:30	Kyrgyzstan	0–1	Hong Kong	0–0	0–1	Start list
22 September	17:30	Indonesia	2–0	Hong Kong	1–0	1–0	Start list

=== Group D ===
Pos	Team	Pld	W	L	GF	GA	GD	Qualification
1	Malaysia	2	2	0	4	0	+4	Advance to Quarterfinals
2	Tajikistan	2	1	1	1	2	−1	
3	Kazakhstan	2	0	2	0	3	−3	

Source: Asian Games 2026

Date	Time		Match result		Games		Players
22 September	9:00	Kazakhstan	0–2	Malaysia	0–1	0–1	Start list
22 September	11:30	Malaysia	2–0	Tajikistan	1–0	1–0	Start list
22 September	17:30	Kazakhstan	0–1	Tajikistan	0–1	0–0	Start list

=== Group E ===
Pos	Team	Pld	W	L	GF	GA	GD	Qualification
1	Jordan	2	2	0	4	0	+4	Advance to Quarterfinals
2	Myanmar	1	0	1	1	3	−2	
3	Bahrain	1	0	1	1	3	−2	

Source: Asian Games 2026

Date	Time		Match result		Games		Players
22 September	9:00	Bahrain	0–2	Jordan	0–1	0–1	Start list
22 September	15:00	Jordan	2–0	Myanmar	1–0	1–0	Start list
22 September	17:30	Bahrain	1–1	Myanmar	1–0	0–1	Start list

=== Group F ===
Pos	Team	Pld	W	L	GF	GA	GD	Qualification
1	Uzbekistan	1	1	0	2	0	+2	Advance to Quarterfinals
2	India	1	1	0	0	0	0	
3	Mongolia	2	0	2	0	2	−2	

Source: Asian Games 2026

Date	Time		Match result		Games		Players
22 September	9:00	India	0–0	Uzbekistan	0–0	0–0	Start list
22 September	15:00	Uzbekistan	2–0	Mongolia	1–0	1–0	Start list
22 September	17:30	India	N/A	Mongolia	DNS	DNS	Start list

== Knockout stage ==
Best-of-three series. Semifinals losers were awarded bronze medals.

Quarterfinals
A1	Iran	1	0	–
A2	Saudi Arabia	0	0	–
B1	Japan	1	0	1
E1	Jordan	0	1	0
C1	Indonesia	0	0	–
F1	Uzbekistan	0	1	–
D1	Malaysia	1	1	–
B2	Thailand	0	0	–

Semifinals
A1	Iran	0	1	1
B1	Japan	1	0	0
F1	Uzbekistan	0	0	–
D1	Malaysia	1	1	–

Finals
A1	Iran	1	3	–
D1	Malaysia	2	0	–

Source: Asian Games 2026

=== Quarterfinals ===
Date	Time		Match result		Games			Report
23 September	9:00	Iran	0–0	Saudi Arabia	1–0	0–0	—N/a	Report
23 September	9:00	Japan	2–1	Jordan	1–0	0–1	1–0	Report
23 September	9:00	Indonesia	0–1	Uzbekistan	0–0	0–1	—N/a	Report
23 September	9:00	Japan	2–0	Jordan	1–0	0–1	—N/a	Report

=== Semifinals ===
Date	Time		Match result		Games			Report
23 September	16:00	Iran	2–1	Japan	0–1	1–0	1–0	Report
23 September	17:40	Malaysia	2–0	Uzbekistan	1–0	1–0	—N/a	Report

=== Finals ===
Date	Time		Match result		Games		Report
23 September	19:20	Iran	4–2	Malaysia	1–2	3–0	Report
