= List of Asian Games medalists in teqball =

This is the complete list of Asian Games medalists in teqball in 2026.

== Events ==
=== Men's singles ===
Games	Gold	Silver	Bronze
2026 Aichi–Nagoya	Lee Jun-suk (KOR)	Ali Jalil (IRQ)	Yoga Ardika Putra (INA)
2026 Aichi–Nagoya	Lee Jun-suk (KOR)	Ali Jalil (IRQ)	Saw Friday (MYA)

=== Men's doubles ===
Games	Gold	Silver	Bronze
2026 Aichi–Nagoya	Sorrasak Thaosiri and Jirati Chanliang (THA)	Ahmad Arabi and Mohamad Hafez (LBN)	Abdul-Rahman Ahmed and Ali Jalil (IRQ)
2026 Aichi–Nagoya	Sorrasak Thaosiri and Jirati Chanliang (THA)	Ahmad Arabi and Mohamad Hafez (LBN)	Basel Ahmad and Abdulwahab Al-Qattan (KUW)

=== Women's singles ===
Games	Gold	Silver	Bronze
2026 Aichi–Nagoya	Khin Hnin Wai (MYA)	Sumaya (INA)	Dy Koemyean (CAM)
2026 Aichi–Nagoya	Khin Hnin Wai (MYA)	Sumaya (INA)	Yuina Sakamoto (JPN)

=== Women's doubles ===
Games	Gold	Silver	Bronze
2026 Aichi–Nagoya	Jutatip Kuntatong and Suphawadi Wongkhamchan (THA)	Hsu Mon Aung and Phyu Phyu Than (MYA)	Yorn Sophornraksmey and Mey Sreymeas (CAM)
2026 Aichi–Nagoya	Jutatip Kuntatong and Suphawadi Wongkhamchan (THA)	Hsu Mon Aung and Phyu Phyu Than (MYA)	Maria Chedid and Kamar Dandal (LBN)

=== Mixed doubles ===
Games	Gold	Silver	Bronze
2026 Aichi–Nagoya	Phakpong Dejaroen and Suphawadi Wongkhamchan (THA)	Akinori Wase and Yuina Sakamoto (JPN)	Abdul-Rahman Ahmed and Samah Shakir (IRQ)
2026 Aichi–Nagoya	Phakpong Dejaroen and Suphawadi Wongkhamchan (THA)	Akinori Wase and Yuina Sakamoto (JPN)	Nguyễn Hoàng Minh Tân and Trịnh Gia Nghi (VIE)
