= Teqball at the 2026 Asian Games =

- Venue: Higashi Sports Center
- Dates: 17–20 September 2026
- Competitors: 55 from 15 nations

Teqball at the 2026 Asian Games was held between 17 and 20 September 2026 at the Higashi Sports Center. This marked the sport's debut at the Asian Games. Each country, except the host country, was limited to three events.

== Schedule ==
P	Preliminary round	¼	Quarterfinals	½	Semifinals	F	Finals

Event↓/Date →	17th Thu		18th Fri		19th Sat	20th Sun
Men's singles	P	¼			½	F
Men's doubles	P	¼			½	F
Women's singles			P	¼	½	F
Women's doubles			P		½	F
Mixed doubles			P	¼	½	F

== Medalists ==
Event	Gold	Silver	Bronze
Men's singles	Lee Jun-suk; South Korea	Ali Jalil; Iraq	Saw Friday; Myanmar
Men's singles	Lee Jun-suk; South Korea	Ali Jalil; Iraq	Yoga Ardika Putra; Indonesia
Men's doubles	Thailand; Sorrasak Thaosiri; Jirati Chanliang	Lebanon; Ahmad Arabi; Mohamad Hafez	Iraq; Abdul-Rahman Ahmed; Ali Jalil
Men's doubles	Thailand; Sorrasak Thaosiri; Jirati Chanliang	Lebanon; Ahmad Arabi; Mohamad Hafez	Kuwait; Basel Ahmad; Abdulwahab Al-Qattan
Women's singles	Khin Hnin Wai; Myanmar	Sumaya; Indonesia	Yuina Sakamoto; Japan
Women's singles	Khin Hnin Wai; Myanmar	Sumaya; Indonesia	Dy Koemyean; Cambodia
Women's doubles	Thailand; Jutatip Kuntatong; Suphawadi Wongkhamchan	Myanmar; Hsu Mon Aung; Phyu Phyu Than	Cambodia; Yorn Sophornraksmey; Mey Sreymeas
Women's doubles	Thailand; Jutatip Kuntatong; Suphawadi Wongkhamchan	Myanmar; Hsu Mon Aung; Phyu Phyu Than	Lebanon; Maria Chedid; Kamar Dandal
Mixed doubles	Thailand; Phakpong Dejaroen; Suphawadi Wongkhamchan	Japan; Akinori Wase; Yuina Sakamoto	Vietnam; Nguyễn Hoàng Minh Tân; Trịnh Gia Nghi
Mixed doubles	Thailand; Phakpong Dejaroen; Suphawadi Wongkhamchan	Japan; Akinori Wase; Yuina Sakamoto	Iraq; Abdul-Rahman Ahmed; Samah Shakir

== Medal table ==
Rank	Nation	Gold	Silver	Bronze	Total
1	Thailand (THA)	3	0	0	3
2	Myanmar (MYA)	1	1	1	3
3	South Korea (KOR)	1	0	0	1
4	Iraq (IRQ)	0	1	2	3
5	Indonesia (INA)	0	1	1	2
5	Japan (JPN)	0	1	1	2
5	Lebanon (LBN)	0	1	1	2
8	Cambodia (CAM)	0	0	2	2
9	Kuwait (KUW)	0	0	1	1
9	Vietnam (VIE)	0	0	1	1
Totals (10 entries)		5	5	10	20

== Participating nations ==
A total of 55 athletes from 15 nations competed in teqball at the 2026 Asian Games:

- Cambodia (4)
- India (3)
- Indonesia (4)
- Iraq (3)
- Japan (4)
- Kuwait (5)
- Kyrgyzstan (2)
- Laos (3)
- Lebanon (4)
- Mongolia (2)
- Myanmar (4)
- Philippines (4)
- South Korea (4)
- Thailand (5)
- Vietnam (4)
