= Teqball at the 2026 Asian Games – Mixed doubles =

Mixed doubles at the 2026 Asian Games
- Venue: Higashi Sports Center
- Dates: 18–20 September 2026
- Competitors: 22 from 11 nations

Medalists
gold medal	Phakpong Dejaroen; Suphawadi Wongkhamchan	Thailand
silver medal	Akinori Wase; Yuina Sakamoto	Japan
bronze medal	Nguyễn Hoàng Minh Tân; Trịnh Gia Nghi	Vietnam
bronze medal	Abdul-Rahman Ahmed; Samah Shakir	Iraq

The mixed doubles teqball tournament at the 2026 Asian Games took place at Higashi Sports Center, Nagoya, Japan from 18 to 20 September 2026.

== Schedule ==
All times are Japan Standard Time (UTC+09:00)

Date	Time	Event
Friday, 18 September 2026	13:00	Group stage
Friday, 18 September 2026	18:30	Quarterfinals
Friday, 18 September 2026	19:30	Repechages
Saturday, 19 September 2026	11:00	Semifinals
Sunday, 20 September 2026	10:30	Bronze medal matches
Sunday, 20 September 2026	16:20	Gold medal match

== Results ==
=== Group stage ===
==== Group A ====
Pos	Team	Pld	W	L	SF	SA	SD	Pts	Qualification
1	Phakpong Dejaroen (THA) Suphawadi Wongkhamchan (THA)	4	4	0	8	0	+8	8	Quarterfinals
2	Bun Thuonvireak (CAM) Yorn Sophornraksmey (CAM)	4	3	1	6	3	+3	7	Quarterfinals
3	Mohamed Anas (IND) Quimcy Dsouza (IND)	4	2	2	5	4	+1	6	Quarterfinals
4	Prince Agustin (PHI) Jhoana Abulencia (PHI)	4	1	3	2	7	−5	5	Quarterfinals
5	Salman Al-Ibrahim (KUW) Hessah Al-Failakawi (KUW)	4	0	4	1	8	−7	4	

Source: FITEQ

	Score		Set 1	Set 2	Set 3
Salman Al-Ibrahim (KUW); Hessah Al-Failakawi (KUW)	0–2	Bun Thuonvireak (CAM); Yorn Sophornraksmey (CAM)	4–12	9–12	
Mohamed Anas (IND); Quimcy Dsouza (IND)	2–0	Prince Agustin (PHI); Jhoana Abulencia (PHI)	12–10	12–3	
Salman Al-Ibrahim (KUW); Hessah Al-Failakawi (KUW)	1–2	Prince Agustin (PHI); Jhoana Abulencia (PHI)	7–12	12–11	8–12
Phakpong Dejaroen (THA); Suphawadi Wongkhamchan (THA)	2–0	Bun Thuonvireak (CAM); Yorn Sophornraksmey (CAM)	12–5	12–5	
Mohamed Anas (IND); Quimcy Dsouza (IND)	1–2	Bun Thuonvireak (CAM); Yorn Sophornraksmey (CAM)	8–12	12–7	10–12
Phakpong Dejaroen (THA); Suphawadi Wongkhamchan (THA)	2–0	Salman Al-Ibrahim (KUW); Hessah Al-Failakawi (KUW)	12–6	12–3	
Phakpong Dejaroen (THA); Suphawadi Wongkhamchan (THA)	2–0	Mohamed Anas (IND); Quimcy Dsouza (IND)	12–3	12–8	
Bun Thuonvireak (CAM); Yorn Sophornraksmey (CAM)	2–0	Prince Agustin (PHI); Jhoana Abulencia (PHI)	12–6	12–2	
Mohamed Anas (IND); Quimcy Dsouza (IND)	2–0	Salman Al-Ibrahim (KUW); Hessah Al-Failakawi (KUW)	12–1	12–6	
Phakpong Dejaroen (THA); Suphawadi Wongkhamchan (THA)	2–0	Prince Agustin (PHI); Jhoana Abulencia (PHI)	12–5	12–5	

==== Group B ====
Pos	Team	Pld	W	L	SF	SA	SD	Pts	Qualification
1	Abdul-Rahman Ahmed (IRQ) Samah Shakir (IRQ)	5	4	1	9	2	+7	9 (Note: Head-to-head result: IRQ 2–0 VIE.)	Quarterfinals
2	Nguyễn Hoàng Minh Tân (VIE) Trịnh Gia Nghi (VIE)	5	4	1	8	3	+5	9	Quarterfinals
3	Akinori Wase (JPN) Yuina Sakamoto (JPN)	5	3	2	6	5	+1	8	Quarterfinals
4	Chaitavanh Inthalapheth (LAO) Seng Phonexay (LAO)	5	2	3	4	7	−3	7 (Note: Head-to-head result: LAO 2–1 KOR.)	Quarterfinals
5	Kim Eun-jun (KOR) Jang Eun-seo (KOR)	5	2	3	7	7	0	7	
6	Kudaiberdi Aidarbekov (KGZ) Aidana Otorbaeva (KGZ)	5	0	5	0	10	−10	5	

Source: FITEQ
Notes:

	Score		Set 1	Set 2	Set 3
Akinori Wase (JPN); Yuina Sakamoto (JPN)	0–2	Nguyễn Hoàng Minh Tân (VIE); Trịnh Gia Nghi (VIE)	11–12	7–12	
Abdul-Rahman Ahmed (IRQ); Samah Shakir (IRQ)	2–0	Chaitavanh Inthalapheth (LAO); Seng Phonexay (LAO)	12–8	12–8	
Kim Eun-jun (KOR); Jang Eun-seo (KOR)	2–0	Kudaiberdi Aidarbekov (KGZ); Aidana Otorbaeva (KGZ)	12–5	12–9	
Kim Eun-jun (KOR); Jang Eun-seo (KOR)	1–2	Chaitavanh Inthalapheth (LAO); Seng Phonexay (LAO)	10–12	12–6	10–12
Akinori Wase (JPN); Yuina Sakamoto (JPN)	2–0	Kudaiberdi Aidarbekov (KGZ); Aidana Otorbaeva (KGZ)	12–5	12–8	
Abdul-Rahman Ahmed (IRQ); Samah Shakir (IRQ)	2–0	Nguyễn Hoàng Minh Tân (VIE); Trịnh Gia Nghi (VIE)	12–11	12–7	
Akinori Wase (JPN); Yuina Sakamoto (JPN)	2–1	Kim Eun-jun (KOR); Jang Eun-seo (KOR)	12–11	10–12	12–7
Abdul-Rahman Ahmed (IRQ); Samah Shakir (IRQ)	2–0	Kudaiberdi Aidarbekov (KGZ); Aidana Otorbaeva (KGZ)	12–4	12–8	
Chaitavanh Inthalapheth (LAO); Seng Phonexay (LAO)	0–2	Nguyễn Hoàng Minh Tân (VIE); Trịnh Gia Nghi (VIE)	7–12	6–12	
Akinori Wase (JPN); Yuina Sakamoto (JPN)	0–2	Abdul-Rahman Ahmed (IRQ); Samah Shakir (IRQ)	10–12	11–12	
Kim Eun-jun (KOR); Jang Eun-seo (KOR)	1–2	Nguyễn Hoàng Minh Tân (VIE); Trịnh Gia Nghi (VIE)	10–12	12–11	11–13
Kudaiberdi Aidarbekov (KGZ); Aidana Otorbaeva (KGZ)	0–2	Chaitavanh Inthalapheth (LAO); Seng Phonexay (LAO)	2–12	6–12	
Abdul-Rahman Ahmed (IRQ); Samah Shakir (IRQ)	1–2	Kim Eun-jun (KOR); Jang Eun-seo (KOR)	12–8	11–12	9–12
Akinori Wase (JPN); Yuina Sakamoto (JPN)	2–0	Chaitavanh Inthalapheth (LAO); Seng Phonexay (LAO)	12–6	12–5	
Kudaiberdi Aidarbekov (KGZ); Aidana Otorbaeva (KGZ)	0–2	Nguyễn Hoàng Minh Tân (VIE); Trịnh Gia Nghi (VIE)	1–12	5–12	

=== Knockout stage ===
Quarterfinals
Phakpong Dejaroen (THA); Suphawadi Wongkhamchan (THA)	12	12
Chaitavanh Inthalapheth (LAO); Seng Phonexay (LAO)	2	5
Nguyễn Hoàng Minh Tân (VIE); Trịnh Gia Nghi (VIE)	12	12
Mohamed Anas (IND); Quimcy Dsouza (IND)	7	10
Akinori Wase (JPN); Yuina Sakamoto (JPN)	12	12
Bun Thuonvireak (CAM); Yorn Sophornraksmey (CAM)	9	11
Prince Agustin (PHI); Jhoana Abulencia (PHI)	3	4
Abdul-Rahman Ahmed (IRQ); Samah Shakir (IRQ)	12	12

Semifinals
Phakpong Dejaroen (THA); Suphawadi Wongkhamchan (THA)	12	12
Nguyễn Hoàng Minh Tân (VIE); Trịnh Gia Nghi (VIE)	8	5
Akinori Wase (JPN); Yuina Sakamoto (JPN)	10	12	12
Abdul-Rahman Ahmed (IRQ); Samah Shakir (IRQ)	12	10	9

Gold medal match
Phakpong Dejaroen (THA); Suphawadi Wongkhamchan (THA)	12	12
Akinori Wase (JPN); Yuina Sakamoto (JPN)	4	5

Repechages
Mohamed Anas (IND); Quimcy Dsouza (IND)	12	12
Prince Agustin (PHI); Jhoana Abulencia (PHI)	3	6
Chaitavanh Inthalapheth (LAO); Seng Phonexay (LAO)	5	3
Bun Thuonvireak (CAM); Yorn Sophornraksmey (CAM)	12	12

Bronze medal matches
Mohamed Anas (IND); Quimcy Dsouza (IND)	9	6
Nguyễn Hoàng Minh Tân (VIE); Trịnh Gia Nghi (VIE)	12	12
Bun Thuonvireak (CAM); Yorn Sophornraksmey (CAM)	12	11	9
Abdul-Rahman Ahmed (IRQ); Samah Shakir (IRQ)	11	12	12
