= Wrestling at the 2026 Asian Games – Men's Greco-Roman 87 kg =

Men's Greco-Roman 87 kg at the 2026 Asian Games
- Venue: Inae Sports Center
- Date: 30 September 2026
- Competitors: 12 from 12 nations

Medalists
gold medal	Taizo Yoshida	Japan
silver medal	Asan Zhanyshov	Kyrgyzstan
bronze medal	Jalgasbay Berdimuratov	Uzbekistan
bronze medal	Sunil Kumar	India

The men's Greco-Roman 87 kilograms wrestling competition at the 2026 Asian Games in Nagoya was held on 1 October 2026 at the Inae Sports Center.

This Greco-Roman wrestling competition consists of a single-elimination tournament, with a repechage used to determine the winner of two bronze medals. The two finalists face off for gold and silver medals. Each wrestler who loses to one of the two finalists moves into the repechage, culminating in a pair of bronze medal matches featuring the semifinal losers each facing the remaining repechage opponent from their half of the bracket.

== Schedule ==
All times are Japan Standard Time (UTC+09:00)

Date	Time	Event
Wednesday, 30 September 2026	10:30	1/8 finals
Wednesday, 30 September 2026	10:30	1/4 finals
Wednesday, 30 September 2026	10:30	Semifinals
Wednesday, 30 September 2026	18:00	Finals

== Results ==
Legend

- WO — Won by walkover

=== Main bracket ===
1/8 finals
Gholamreza Farrokhi (IRI)	6
Shamil Ozhaev (KAZ)	6
Jalgasbay Berdimuratov (UZB)	8
Shi Likui (CHN)	0
Ganboldyn Törbold (MGL)	0
Muhammad Sultonzoda (TJK)	8
Mohamad Hussein Awarke (LBN)
Callum Roberts (PHI)	WO

1/4 finals
Lee Seung-hwan (KOR)	0
Shamil Ozhaev (KAZ)	11
Jalgasbay Berdimuratov (UZB)	0
Asan Zhanyshov (KGZ)	4
Sunil Kumar (IND)	9
Muhammad Sultonzoda (TJK)	0
Callum Roberts (PHI)	0
Taizo Yoshida (JPN)	10

Semifinals
Shamil Ozhaev (KAZ)	1
Asan Zhanyshov (KGZ)	6
Sunil Kumar (IND)	0
Taizo Yoshida (JPN)	11

Final
Asan Zhanyshov (KGZ)	1
Taizo Yoshida (JPN)	11

=== Repechage ===
Bronze medal matches
Jalgasbay Berdimuratov (UZB)	9
Shamil Ozhaev (KAZ)	1
Callum Roberts (PHI)	0
Sunil Kumar (IND)	9

== Final standing ==
Rank	Athlete
1st place, gold medalist(s)	Taizo Yoshida (JPN)
2nd place, silver medalist(s)	Asan Zhanyshov (KGZ)
3rd place, bronze medalist(s)	Jalgasbay Berdimuratov (UZB)
3rd place, bronze medalist(s)	Sunil Kumar (IND)
5	Shamil Ozhaev (KAZ)
5	Callum Roberts (PHI)
7	Muhammad Sultonzoda (TJK)
8	Gholamreza Farrokhi (IRI)
9	Shi Likui (CHN)
10	Ganboldyn Törbold (MGL)
11	Lee Seung-hwan (KOR)
—	Mohammad Hussein Awarke (LBN)
