= Wrestling at the 2026 Asian Games – Men's Greco-Roman 60 kg =

Men's Greco-Roman 60 kg at the 2026 Asian Games
- Venue: Inae Sports Center
- Date: 1 October 2026
- Competitors: 14 from 14 nations

Medalists
gold medal	Zholaman Sharshenbekov	Kyrgyzstan
silver medal	Alisher Ganiev	Uzbekistan
bronze medal	Sajjad Ali	Iraq
bronze medal	Ayata Suzuki	Japan

The men's Greco-Roman 60 kilograms wrestling competition at the 2026 Asian Games in Nagoya was held on 1 October 2026 at the Inae Sports Center.

This Greco-Roman wrestling competition consists of a single-elimination tournament, with a repechage used to determine the winner of two bronze medals. The two finalists face off for gold and silver medals. Each wrestler who loses to one of the two finalists moves into the repechage, culminating in a pair of bronze medal matches featuring the semifinal losers each facing the remaining repechage opponent from their half of the bracket.

== Schedule ==
All times are Japan Standard Time (UTC+09:00)

Date	Time	Event
Thursday, 1 October 2026	10:30	1/8 finals
Thursday, 1 October 2026	10:30	1/4 finals
Thursday, 1 October 2026	10:30	Semifinals
Thursday, 1 October 2026	10:30	Repechages
Thursday, 1 October 2026	18:00	Finals

== Results ==
Legend

- F — Won by fall

=== Main bracket ===
1/8 finals
Zholaman Sharshenbekov (KGZ)	9
Kim Da-hyun (KOR)	0
Nguyễn Đình Huy (VIE)	9
Mönkh-Erdeniin Davaabandi (MGL)	0
Aslamjon Azizov (TJK)	0
Sajjad Ali (IRQ)	8
Yernur Fidakhmetov (KAZ)	0
Ayata Suzuki (JPN)	9
Joe Fer Callado (PHI)	0
Alisher Ganiev (UZB)	9
Tan Haodong (CHN)	3
Sajjad Abbaspour (IRI)	5

1/4 finals
Azatjan Açilow (TKM)	0
Zholaman Sharshenbekov (KGZ)	8
Nguyễn Đình Huy (VIE)	0
Sajjad Ali (IRQ)	7^{F}
Ayata Suzuki (JPN)	0
Alisher Ganiev (UZB)	11
Sajjad Abbaspour (IRI)	1
Sumit Dalal (IND)	1

Semifinals
Zholaman Sharshenbekov (KGZ)	8
Sajjad Ali (IRQ)	0
Alisher Ganiev (UZB)	8
Sajjad Abbaspour (IRI)	4

Final
Zholaman Sharshenbekov (KGZ)	7
Alisher Ganiev (UZB)	5

=== Repechage ===
Repechage
Kim Da-hyun (KOR)	12
Azatjan Açilow (TKM)	1
Joe Fer Callado (PHI)	0
Ayata Suzuki (JPN)	8

Bronze medal matches
Kim Da-hyun (KOR)	4
Sajjad Ali (IRQ)	6
Ayata Suzuki (JPN)	7
Sajjad Abbaspour (IRI)	4

== Final standing ==
Rank	Athlete
1st place, gold medalist(s)	Zholaman Sharshenbekov (KGZ)
2nd place, silver medalist(s)	Alisher Ganiev (UZB)
3rd place, bronze medalist(s)	Sajjad Ali (IRQ)
3rd place, bronze medalist(s)	Ayata Suzuki (JPN)
5	Kim Da-hyun (KOR)
5	Sajjad Abbaspour (IRI)
7	Nguyễn Đình Huy (VIE)
8	Tan Haodong (CHN)
9	Sumit Dalal (IND)
10	Azatjan Açilow (TKM)
11	Aslamjon Azizov (TJK)
12	Mönkh-Erdeniin Davaabandi (MGL)
13	Yernur Fidakhmetov (KAZ)
14	Joe Fer Callado (PHI)
