= Quimcy Dsouza =

Indian Teqball player (born 2004)

Personal information
- Full name: Quimcy Joaquim Dsouza
- Nationality: Indian
- Born: 2004 (age 21–22)

Sport
- Sport: Teqball

Quimcy Joaquim Dsouza (born 2004) is an Indian teqball player from Maharashtra. She represented India in the women's singles and mixed doubles event at the 2026 Asian Games in September 2026.

== Biography ==
Dsouza is born in Mumbai in 2004. As a 13 year old, she took up middle-distance running but later shifted to football and represented the Maharashtra under-19 football team. She has a degree in sports management and works as a test engineer for a sports goods retailer.

Dsouza took up Teqball in 2022 and founded the Teqball Club of Bengaluru. She is a seven time national champion and was ranked as high as 24th in the world. She finished ninth in the 2026 Teqball World Championships in Romania.

Teqball made its debut at the Asian Games in the 2026 edition at Japan. She represented India in the women's singles and mixed doubles event, along with Mohammad Anas. In the first round of the women's singles event, she defeated the top-seed Yuina Sakamoto of Japan 2-1 (10–12, 12–11, 13–11) in her opening Group A match held at the Nagoya City Higashi Sports Center. In her second group match, she beat Koemyean DY of Cambodia 2-0 (12–9, 12–7) to qualify for the semifinal. In the semifinals, she lost to Sumaya of Indonesia 1-2 (12–7, 9–12, 7–12) and also lost the bronze medal play-off to Sakamoto of Japan 11–12, 11-12 and finished fifth.
