= Teqball at the 2026 Asian Games – Women's singles =

Women's singles at the 2026 Asian Games
- Venue: Higashi Sports Center
- Dates: 18–20 September 2026
- Competitors: 7 from 7 nations

Medalists
gold medal	Khin Hnin Wai	Myanmar
silver medal	Sumaya	Indonesia
bronze medal	Yuina Sakamoto	Japan
bronze medal	Dy Koemyean	Cambodia

The women's singles teqball tournament at the 2026 Asian Games took place at Higashi Sports Center, Nagoya, Japan from 18 to 20 September 2026.

== Schedule ==
All times are Japan Standard Time (UTC+09:00)

Date	Time	Event
Friday, 18 September 2026	09:00	Group stage
Friday, 18 September 2026	11:00	Quarterfinals
Saturday, 19 September 2026	10:00	Semifinals
Sunday, 20 September 2026	10:00	Bronze medal matches
Sunday, 20 September 2026	15:00	Gold medal match

== Results ==
=== Group stage ===
==== Group A ====
Pos	Athlete	Pld	W	L	SF	SA	SD	Pts	Qualification
1	Quimcy Dsouza (IND)	2	2	0	4	1	+3	4	Semifinals
2	Yuina Sakamoto (JPN)	2	1	1	3	2	+1	3	Quarterfinals
3	Dy Koemyean (CAM)	2	0	2	0	4	−4	2	Quarterfinals

Source: FITEQ

	Score		Set 1	Set 2	Set 3
Yuina Sakamoto (JPN)	2–0	Dy Koemyean (CAM)	12–5	12–6	
Yuina Sakamoto (JPN)	1–2	Quimcy Dsouza (IND)	12–10	11–12	11–13
Quimcy Dsouza (IND)	2–0	Dy Koemyean (CAM)	12–9	12–7	

==== Group B ====
Pos	Athlete	Pld	W	L	SF	SA	SD	Pts	Qualification
1	Khin Hnin Wai (MYA)	3	3	0	6	0	+6	6	Semifinals
2	Sumaya (INA)	3	2	1	4	3	+1	5	Quarterfinals
3	Kamar Dandal (LBN)	3	1	2	2	4	−2	4	Quarterfinals
4	Aidana Otorbaeva (KGZ)	3	0	3	1	6	−5	3	

Source: FITEQ

	Score		Set 1	Set 2	Set 3
Aidana Otorbaeva (KGZ)	0–2	Khin Hnin Wai (MYA)	6–12	6–12	
Kamar Dandal (LBN)	0–2	Sumaya (INA)	9–12	11–12	
Aidana Otorbaeva (KGZ)	0–2	Kamar Dandal (LBN)	7–12	3–12	
Khin Hnin Wai (MYA)	2–0	Sumaya (INA)	12–10	12–8	
Aidana Otorbaeva (KGZ)	1–2	Sumaya (INA)	12–6	6–12	6–12
Kamar Dandal (LBN)	0–2	Khin Hnin Wai (MYA)	7–12	4–12	

=== Knockout stage ===
Quarterfinals			Semifinals				Gold medal match
			Quimcy Dsouza (IND)	12	9	7
Sumaya (INA)	12	12	Sumaya (INA)	7	12	12
Dy Koemyean (CAM)	8	7					Sumaya (INA)	12	8	9
Yuina Sakamoto (JPN)	9	7					Khin Hnin Wai (MYA)	10	12	12
Kamar Dandal (LBN)	12	12	Kamar Dandal (LBN)	7	8
			Khin Hnin Wai (MYA)	12	12

Bronze medal matches
Yuina Sakamoto (JPN)	12	12
Quimcy Dsouza (IND)	11	11
Dy Koemyean (CAM)	12	10	12
Kamar Dandal (LBN)	10	12	6
