= Teqball at the 2026 Asian Games – Men's doubles =

Men's doubles at the 2026 Asian Games
- Venue: Higashi Sports Center
- Dates: 17–20 September 2026
- Competitors: 24 from 12 nations

Medalists
gold medal	Sorrasak Thaosiri; Jirati Chanliang	Thailand
silver medal	Ahmad Arabi; Mohamad Hafez	Lebanon
bronze medal	Abdul-Rahman Ahmed; Ali Jalil	Iraq
bronze medal	Basel Ahmad; Abdulwahab Al-Qattan	Kuwait

The men's doubles teqball tournament at the 2026 Asian Games took place at Higashi Sports Center, Nagoya, Japan from 17 to 20 September 2026.

== Schedule ==
All times are Japan Standard Time (UTC+09:00)

Date	Time	Event
Thursday, 17 September 2026	16:00	Group stage
Thursday, 17 September 2026	18:30	Quarterfinals
Thursday, 17 September 2026	19:30	Repechages
Saturday, 19 September 2026	12:00	Semifinals
Sunday, 20 September 2026	11:30	Bronze medal matches
Sunday, 20 September 2026	17:50	Gold medal match

== Results ==
=== Group stage ===
==== Group A ====
Pos	Team	Pld	W	L	SF	SA	SD	Pts	Qualification
1	Sorrasak Thaosiri (THA) Jirati Chanliang (THA)	2	2	0	4	0	+4	4	Quarterfinals
2	Husni Uba (INA) Mardan Laode Ardin (INA)	2	1	1	2	3	−1	3	Quarterfinals
3	Dailan Christoffe Montenegro (PHI) Anel Pacis (PHI)	2	0	2	1	4	−3	2	

Source: FITEQ

	Score		Set 1	Set 2	Set 3
Sorrasak Thaosiri (THA); Jirati Chanliang (THA)	2–0	Dailan Christoffe Montenegro (PHI); Anel Pacis (PHI)	12–7	12–4	
Sorrasak Thaosiri (THA); Jirati Chanliang (THA)	2–0	Husni Uba (INA); Mardan Laode Ardin (INA)	12–3	12–10	
Husni Uba (INA); Mardan Laode Ardin (INA)	2–1	Dailan Christoffe Montenegro (PHI); Anel Pacis (PHI)	12–5	7–12	12–7

==== Group B ====
Pos	Team	Pld	W	L	SF	SA	SD	Pts	Qualification
1	Bá Trường Giang (VIE) Lê Anh Khoa (VIE)	2	2	0	4	0	+4	4	Quarterfinals
2	Lee Jun-suk (KOR) Lee Tae-been (KOR)	2	1	1	2	2	0	3	Quarterfinals
3	Declan Gonsalves (IND) Mohamed Anas (IND)	2	0	2	0	4	−4	2	

Source: FITEQ

	Score		Set 1	Set 2	Set 3
Declan Gonsalves (IND); Mohamed Anas (IND)	0–2	Bá Trường Giang (VIE); Lê Anh Khoa (VIE)	10–12	8–12	
Declan Gonsalves (IND); Mohamed Anas (IND)	0–2	Lee Jun-suk (KOR); Lee Tae-been (KOR)	4–12	7–12	
Lee Jun-suk (KOR); Lee Tae-been (KOR)	0–2	Bá Trường Giang (VIE); Lê Anh Khoa (VIE)	7–12	9–12	

==== Group C ====
Pos	Team	Pld	W	L	SF	SA	SD	Pts	Qualification
1	Basel Ahmad (KUW) Abdulwahab Al-Qattan (KUW)	2	2	0	4	1	+3	4	Quarterfinals
2	Takahiro Nodomi (JPN) Seiya Arai (JPN)	2	1	1	3	2	+1	3	Quarterfinals
3	Nominchimegiin Tsetsenberkh (MGL) Ganzorigiin Chingüün (MGL)	2	0	2	0	4	−4	2	

Source: FITEQ

	Score		Set 1	Set 2	Set 3
Basel Ahmad (KUW); Abdulwahab Al-Qattan (KUW)	2–0	Nominchimegiin Tsetsenberkh (MGL); Ganzorigiin Chingüün (MGL)	12–3	12–3	
Basel Ahmad (KUW); Abdulwahab Al-Qattan (KUW)	2–1	Takahiro Nodomi (JPN); Seiya Arai (JPN)	10–12	12–9	12–5
Takahiro Nodomi (JPN); Seiya Arai (JPN)	2–0	Nominchimegiin Tsetsenberkh (MGL); Ganzorigiin Chingüün (MGL)	12–1	12–0	

==== Group D ====
Pos	Team	Pld	W	L	SF	SA	SD	Pts	Qualification
1	Abdul-Rahman Ahmed (IRQ) Ali Jalil (IRQ)	2	2	0	4	0	+4	4	Quarterfinals
2	Ahmad Arabi (LBN) Mohamad Hafez (LBN)	2	1	1	2	2	0	3	Quarterfinals
3	Alisa Phomsouliya (LAO) Chaitavanh Inthalapheth (LAO)	2	0	2	0	4	−4	2	

Source: FITEQ

	Score		Set 1	Set 2	Set 3
Abdul-Rahman Ahmed (IRQ); Ali Jalil (IRQ)	2–0	Alisa Phomsouliya (LAO); Chaitavanh Inthalapheth (LAO)	12–2	12–6	
Abdul-Rahman Ahmed (IRQ); Ali Jalil (IRQ)	2–0	Ahmad Arabi (LBN); Mohamad Hafez (LBN)	12–8	12–8	
Ahmad Arabi (LBN); Mohamad Hafez (LBN)	2–0	Alisa Phomsouliya (LAO); Chaitavanh Inthalapheth (LAO)	12–4	12–4	

=== Knockout stage ===
Quarterfinals
Sorrasak Thaosiri (THA); Jirati Chanliang (THA)	12	12
Takahiro Nodomi (JPN); Seiya Arai (JPN)	2	8
Lee Jun-suk (KOR); Lee Tae-been (KOR)	9	7
Abdul-Rahman Ahmed (IRQ); Ali Jalil (IRQ)	12	12
Basel Ahmad (KUW); Abdulwahab Al-Qattan (KUW)	12	12
Husni Uba (INA); Mardan Laode Ardin (INA)	9	6
Ahmad Arabi (LBN); Mohamad Hafez (LBN)	12	12
Bá Trường Giang (VIE); Lê Anh Khoa (VIE)	7	10

Semifinals
Sorrasak Thaosiri (THA); Jirati Chanliang (THA)	12	12
Abdul-Rahman Ahmed (IRQ); Ali Jalil (IRQ)	3	11
Basel Ahmad (KUW); Abdulwahab Al-Qattan (KUW)	9	12	9
Ahmad Arabi (LBN); Mohamad Hafez (LBN)	12	11	12

Gold medal match
Sorrasak Thaosiri (THA); Jirati Chanliang (THA)	12	12
Ahmad Arabi (LBN); Mohamad Hafez (LBN)	7	4

Repechages
Lee Jun-suk (KOR); Lee Tae-been (KOR)	8	12	9
Bá Trường Giang (VIE); Lê Anh Khoa (VIE)	12	11	12
Takahiro Nodomi (JPN); Seiya Arai (JPN)	4	7
Husni Uba (INA); Mardan Laode Ardin (INA)	12	12

Bronze medal matches
Bá Trường Giang (VIE); Lê Anh Khoa (VIE)	12	9	7
Abdul-Rahman Ahmed (IRQ); Ali Jalil (IRQ)	7	12	12
Husni Uba (INA); Mardan Laode Ardin (INA)	5	12	10
Basel Ahmad (KUW); Abdulwahab Al-Qattan (KUW)	12	7	12
