= Mixed martial arts at the 2026 Asian Games – Women's traditional 60 kg =

Women's traditional 60 kg at the 2026 Asian Games
- Venue: Nagoya City Inae Sports Center
- Dates: 20–22 September 2026
- Competitors: 8 from 8 nations

Medalists
gold medal	Teo Hui Hoon	Singapore
silver medal	Khiola Sobirova	Uzbekistan
bronze medal	Dalin Cheng	Cambodia
bronze medal	Suchika Tariyal	India

The women's MMA traditional 60 kilograms competition at the 2026 Asian Games in Nagoya, Japan was held from 20 to 22 September 2026 at the Nagoya City Inae Sports Center.

Competition bouts consist of 2 rounds in total, each lasting 3 minutes in Preliminary matches or 5 minutes in Finals with a one-minute rest period between rounds. Grabbing and holding the clothing (Gi), pants, or belt of the Traditional MMA combat attire is legal.

== Schedule ==
All times are Japan Standard Time (UTC+09:00)

Date	Time	Event
Sunday, 20 September 2026	11:20	Quarterfinals
Monday, 21 September 2026	11:40	Semifinals
Tuesday, 22 September 2026	15:30	Final

== Results ==
Quarterfinals
Arezou Salimighalehtaki (IRI)	0
Teo Hui Hoon (SGP)	3
Altanchimeg Baigalmaa (MGL)	0
Suchika Tariyal (IND)	2
Khiola Sobirova (UZB)	3
Lin Yu-fen (TPE)	0
Fatima Turki S Alammari (KSA)	0
Dalin Cheng (CAM)	2

Semifinals
Teo Hui Hoon (SGP)	2
Suchika Tariyal (IND)	0
Khiola Sobirova (UZB)	2
Dalin Cheng (CAM)	0

Final
Teo Hui Hoon (SGP)	3
Khiola Sobirova (UZB)	0

== External Link ==
- Results
