= Teqball at the 2026 Asian Games – Men's singles =

Men's singles at the 2026 Asian Games
- Venue: Higashi Sports Center
- Dates: 17–20 September 2026
- Competitors: 11 from 11 nations

Medalists
gold medal	Lee Jun-suk	South Korea
silver medal	Ali Jalil	Iraq
bronze medal	Saw Friday	Myanmar
bronze medal	Yoga Ardika Putra	Indonesia

The men's singles teqball tournament at the 2026 Asian Games took place at Higashi Sports Center, Nagoya, Japan from 17 to 20 September 2026.

== Schedule ==
All times are Japan Standard Time (UTC+09:00)

Date	Time	Event
Thursday, 17 September 2026	09:00	Group stage
Thursday, 17 September 2026	14:30	Quarterfinals
Thursday, 17 September 2026	15:30	Repechages
Saturday, 19 September 2026	11:30	Semifinals
Sunday, 20 September 2026	11:00	Bronze medal matches
Sunday, 20 September 2026	15:40	Gold medal match

== Results ==
Legend

- r — Retired
- WO — Won by walkover

=== Group stage ===
==== Group A ====
Pos	Athlete	Pld	W	L	SF	SA	SD	Pts	Qualification
1	Ali Jalil (IRQ)	4	4	0	8	0	+8	8	Quarterfinals
2	Zaid Eidan (KUW)	4	3	1	6	2	+4	7	Quarterfinals
3	Saw Friday (MYA)	4	2	2	4	4	0	6	Quarterfinals
4	Kudaiberdi Aidarbekov (KGZ)	4	1	3	2	6	−4	5	Quarterfinals
5	Ganzorigiin Chingüün (MGL)	4	0	4	0	8	−8	4	

Source: FITEQ

	Score		Set 1	Set 2	Set 3
Zaid Eidan (KUW)	2–0	Saw Friday (MYA)	12–8	12–8	
Kudaiberdi Aidarbekov (KGZ)	2–0	Ganzorigiin Chingüün (MGL)	12–10	12–7	
Kudaiberdi Aidarbekov (KGZ)	0–2	Saw Friday (MYA)	8–12	3–12	
Ali Jalil (IRQ)	2–0	Ganzorigiin Chingüün (MGL)	12–1	12–2	
Ali Jalil (IRQ)	2–0	Kudaiberdi Aidarbekov (KGZ)	12–2	12–2	
Zaid Eidan (KUW)	2–0	Ganzorigiin Chingüün (MGL)	12–0	12–3	
Ali Jalil (IRQ)	2–0	Zaid Eidan (KUW)	12–8	12–7	
Ganzorigiin Chingüün (MGL)	0–2	Saw Friday (MYA)	6–12	1–12	
Zaid Eidan (KUW)	2–0	Kudaiberdi Aidarbekov (KGZ)	12–5	12–3	
Ali Jalil (IRQ)	2–0	Saw Friday (MYA)	12–10	12–4	

==== Group B ====
Pos	Athlete	Pld	W	L	SF	SA	SD	Pts	Qualification
1	Lee Jun-suk (KOR)	5	5	0	10	0	+10	10	Quarterfinals
2	Yoga Ardika Putra (INA)	5	4	1	8	4	+4	9	Quarterfinals
3	Akinori Wase (JPN)	5	3	2	7	5	+2	8	Quarterfinals
4	Prince Agustin (PHI)	5	2	3	4	7	−3	7	Quarterfinals
5	Bá Trường Giang (VIE)	5	1	4	5	8	−3	6	
6	Alisa Phomsouliya (LAO)	5	0	5	0	10	−10	5	

Source: FITEQ

	Score		Set 1	Set 2	Set 3
Yoga Ardika Putra (INA)	2–1	Bá Trường Giang (VIE)	7–12	12–11	12–8
Akinori Wase (JPN)	2–0	Prince Agustin (PHI)	12–4	12–8	
Lee Jun-suk (KOR)	2–0	Alisa Phomsouliya (LAO)	12–1	12–0	
Lee Jun-suk (KOR)	2–0	Prince Agustin (PHI)	12–5	12–6	
Yoga Ardika Putra (INA)	2–0	Alisa Phomsouliya (LAO)	12–5	12–6	
Akinori Wase (JPN)	2–1	Bá Trường Giang (VIE)	11–12	12–10	12–8
Yoga Ardika Putra (INA)	0–2	Lee Jun-suk (KOR)	1–12	3–12	
Akinori Wase (JPN)	2–0	Alisa Phomsouliya (LAO)	12–2	12–3	
Prince Agustin (PHI)	2–1	Bá Trường Giang (VIE)	12–8	5–12	16–14
Yoga Ardika Putra (INA)	2–1	Akinori Wase (JPN)	6–12	12–9	15–13
Lee Jun-suk (KOR)	2–0	Bá Trường Giang (VIE)	12–8	12–4	
Alisa Phomsouliya (LAO)	0–2	Prince Agustin (PHI)	11–12	8–12	
Akinori Wase (JPN)	0–2	Lee Jun-suk (KOR)	5–12	9–12	
Yoga Ardika Putra (INA)	2–0	Prince Agustin (PHI)	12–8	12–8	
Alisa Phomsouliya (LAO)	0–2	Bá Trường Giang (VIE)	5–12	6–12	

=== Knockout stage ===
Quarterfinals			Semifinals			Gold medal match
Ali Jalil (IRQ)	12	12
Prince Agustin (PHI)	6	2	Ali Jalil (IRQ)	12	12
Yoga Ardika Putra (INA)	7	8	Saw Friday (MYA)	11	11
Saw Friday (MYA)	12	12				Ali Jalil (IRQ)	11	5
Akinori Wase (JPN)	6	9				Lee Jun-suk (KOR)	12	12
Zaid Eidan (KUW)	12	12	Zaid Eidan (KUW)	10	2^{r}
Kudaiberdi Aidarbekov (KGZ)	2	1	Lee Jun-suk (KOR)	12	3
Lee Jun-suk (KOR)	12	12

Repechages
Prince Agustin (PHI)	12	12
Kudaiberdi Aidarbekov (KGZ)	2	8
Yoga Ardika Putra (INA)	12	12
Akinori Wase (JPN)	3	11

Bronze medal matches
Prince Agustin (PHI)	7	7
Saw Friday (MYA)	12	12
Yoga Ardika Putra (INA)	W	O
Zaid Eidan (KUW)
