= Laos at the 2026 Asian Games =

- IOC code: LAO
- NOC: National Olympic Committee of Laos

in Aichi–Nagoya, Japan September 19 – October 4, 2026
- Competitors: 68 in 15 sports
- Medals Ranked 37th: Gold 0 Silver 0 Bronze 1 Total 1

Asian Games appearances (overview)
- 1974; 1978; 1982; 1986; 1990; 1994; 1998; 2002; 2006; 2010; 2014; 2018; 2022; 2026

Laos is scheduled to compete at the 2026 Asian Games in Aichi Prefecture and Nagoya, Japan from September 19 to October 4, 2026.

== Medalists ==
=== Medals by sport ===
Medals by sport
Sport	Gold	Silver	Bronze	Total
Sepak takraw	0	0	1	1
Total	0	0	1	1

== Competitors ==
The following is the list of number of competitors in the Games.

Sport	Men	Women	Total
Athletics	2	2	4
Badminton	2	0	2
Boxing	2	0	2
Esports	5	0	5
Fencing	1	0	1
Gymnastics	0	1	1
Ju-jitsu	2	1	3
Judo	3	2	5
Karate	2	2	4
Sepak takraw	11	8	19
Soft tennis	5	1	6
Swimming	1	1	2
Table tennis	4	1	5
Teqball	2	1	3
Wushu	3	1	4
Total	45	21	66

== Athletics ==
Key

- Note–Ranks given for track events are within the athlete's heat only
- Q = Qualified for the next round
- q = Qualified for the next round as a fastest loser or, in field events, by position without achieving the qualifying target
- NR = National record
- N/A = Round not applicable for the event
- Bye = Athlete not required to compete in round

Track events
Men

Athlete	Event	Heat		Semifinal		Final	
Athlete	Event	Result	Rank	Result	Rank	Result	Rank
Sorsy Phomphakdi	100 m	11.16	7	Did not advance			
Sorsy Phomphakdi	200 m	22.89	6	Did not advance			
Deuanpheang Xayyapheat	110 m hurdles	15.50	6	—N/a		Did not advance	

Women

Athlete	Event	Heat		Final	
Athlete	Event	Result	Rank	Result	Rank
Khanmalaiphone Bounyaveun	100 m hurdles	14.61	5	Did not advance	

Road events

Athlete	Event	Final	
Athlete	Event	Result	Rank
Lodkeo Inthakoumman	Women's marathon	2:50:03	15

== Badminton ==
Athlete	Event	Round of 32	Round of 16	Quarterfinals	Semifinals	Final	
Athlete	Event	Opposition Score	Opposition Score	Opposition Score	Opposition Score	Opposition Score	Rank
Namboun Luang Amath; Phonesack Sokthavy	Doubles	Charoenkitamorn / Thongsa-nga (THA); L 0–2	Did not advance				

== Boxing ==
Athlete	Event	Round of 32	Round of 16	Quarterfinals	Semifinals	Final	
Athlete	Event	Opposition Result	Opposition Result	Opposition Result	Opposition Result	Opposition Result	Rank
Vanesy Heuangthisouan	Men's 55 kg	Eshish (JOR); L RSC	Did not advance				
Souliya Khammy	Men's 60 kg	Ubaidov (TJK); L 0–5	Did not advance				

== Esports ==
Honor of Kings

Gamer	Event	Group stage				Rank	Quarter-final	Semi-final	Final	Rank
Gamer	Event	Opposition Score	Opposition Score	Opposition Score	Opposition Score	Rank	Opposition Score	Opposition Score	Opposition Score	Rank
Khampeng Banluesack; Phokham Korsaphankham; Sahalath Oulakone; Soutthixay Saniseng; Veelakone Inthilad	Honor of Kings									

== Fencing ==
Athlete	Event	Round of 32	Round of 16	Quarterfinal	Semifinal	Final / BM	
Athlete	Event	Opposition Score	Opposition Score	Opposition Score	Opposition Score	Opposition Score	Rank
Quentin Saysana Geoffroy	Men's sabre	–	–	–	–	–	

== Gymnastics ==
=== Rhythmic ===
Athlete	Event	Qualification						Final					
Athlete	Event	Hoop	Ball	Clubs	Ribbon	Total	Rank	Hoop	Ball	Clubs	Ribbon	Total	Rank
Praewa Misato Philaphandeth	Women's individual	22.300	18.550	20.200	19.950	81.000	19	Did not advance					

== Ju-jitsu ==
Athlete	Event	Round of 64	Round of 32	Round of 16	Quarterfinals	Semifinals	Repechage	Final / BM	
Athlete	Event	Opposition Result	Opposition Result	Opposition Result	Opposition Result	Opposition Result	Opposition Result	Opposition Result	Rank
Khamkeo Vilayphone	Men's –62 kg	—N/a	Al-Suwaidi (UAE); L SUB 0–50	Did not advance					
Chindavone Syvanevilay	Men's –69 kg	Bye	Omet (JOR); L SUB 0–50	Did not advance					
Peng	Women's –52 kg	—N/a	Bye	Im (KOR); L SUB 0–50	Did not advance				

== Judo ==
Men

Athlete	Event	Round of 32	Round of 16	Quarterfinals	Semifinals	Repechage	Final / BM	
Athlete	Event	Opposition Result	Opposition Result	Opposition Result	Opposition Result	Opposition Result	Opposition Result	Rank
Soukphaxay Sithisane	–60 kg	Maulana (INA); L 000–100	Did not advance					
Xaisengxeun Nouveneuen	–73 kg	Aloev (BRN); L 000–100	Did not advance					
Soulisay Sayasan	–81 kg	Bye	Lee (KOR); L 000–101	Did not advance				

Women

Athlete	Event	Round of 16	Quarterfinals	Semifinals	Repechage	Final / BM	
Athlete	Event	Opposition Result	Opposition Result	Opposition Result	Opposition Result	Opposition Result	Rank
Toukky Sengdakee	–52 kg	Sarsenova (KAZ); L 000–100	Did not advance				
Alabama Namthip Slayman	–70 kg	Tang (CHN); L 000–100	Did not advance				

== Karate ==
Men

Athlete	Event	Round of 32	Round of 16	Quarterfinals	Semifinals	Repechage	Final / BM	
Athlete	Event	Opposition Result	Opposition Result	Opposition Result	Opposition Result	Opposition Result	Opposition Result	Rank
Somphone Bounna	67 kg	Bye	Al-Masatfa (JOR); L 1–9	Did not advance				
Vatthana Xayasan	+84 kg	—N/a		Nemati (IRI); L 0–5	Did not advance	Sherpa (NEP); L 1–9		5

Women

Athlete	Event	Round of 16	Quarterfinals	Semifinals	Repechage	Final / BM	
Athlete	Event	Opposition Result	Opposition Result	Opposition Result	Opposition Result	Opposition Result	Rank
Pa Turvanxhai	55 kg	Saeidabadi (IRI); L 0–8	Did not advance		Hafezan (SGP); L 0–2	Did not advance	
Sonesavanh Chanthavong	61 kg	Jong (PRK); L 0–3	Did not advance				

== Sepak takraw ==
Men

Athlete	Event	Group stage				Semi-finals	Final	
Athlete	Event	Opposition Score	Opposition Score	Opposition Score	Rank	Opposition Score	Opposition Score	Rank
Anousone Vilavongsa; Daophachanh Moungsin; Daovy Xanavongxay; Noum Souvannady; Phitthasanh Bounpaseuth; Soukkaserm Chanthahieng	Quadrant	Myanmar (MYA); L 1-2	India (IND); L 0-2	Vietnam (VIE); W 2-0	3	Did not advance		
Adong Phoumisin; Anousone Vilavongsa; Bigkee Phiengxaiyadeth; Daophachanh Moungsin; Daovy Xanavongxay; Nawin Siriwicha; Noum Souvannady; Phitthasanh Bounpaseuth; Sengvanh Boulommavong; Soukkaserm Chanthahieng; Yothin Sombatphouthone	Team regu	Indonesia (INA); L 0–3	South Korea (KOR); L 1–2	Thailand (THA); L 0–3	4	Did not advance		

Women

Athlete	Event	Group stage				Semi-finals	Final	
Athlete	Event	Opposition Score	Opposition Score	Opposition Score	Rank	Opposition Score	Opposition Score	Rank
Koy Xayavong; Norkham Vongxay; Sonesavan Keosouliya	Doubles	Vietnam (VIE); W 2–1	Malaysia (MAS); W 2-0	Myanmar (MYA); W 2-0	1 Q	Philippines (PHI); L 0-2	Did not advance	3rd place, bronze medalist(s)
Aksonesavanh Philavong; Janjira Prasangkhon; May Phiathep; Mixaiphone Longmeuangma; Sone Amphay Soulinthone	Quadrant	Indonesia (INA); L 0-2	Malaysia (MAS); L 0-2	Japan (JPN); L 1-2	4	Did not advance		

== Soft tennis ==
Men

Athlete	Event	Group stage				Second Stage	Quarter-finals	Semi-finals	Final / BM	
Athlete	Event	Opposition Score	Opposition Score	Opposition Score	Rank	Opposition Score	Opposition Score	Opposition Score	Opposition Score	Rank
Bekki Vongphakdy	Singles	Falevi (INA); L 0–4	Nuguit (PHI); L 2–4	—N/a	3	Did not advance				
Phatthana Louangsisombath	Singles	Bhandari (NEP); L 3–4	Chang (TPE); L 0–4	—N/a	3	Did not advance				
Bekki Vongphakdy; Phatthana Louangsisombath; Sataporn Simmalavong; Senthanongvath Pasomsouk; Viengthong Phienvihane	Team	India; L 0–3	Mongolia; W 2–1	Chinese Taipei; L 0–3	3	—N/a		Did not advance		

Women

Athlete	Event	Group stage			Second Stage	Quarter-finals	Semi-finals	Final / BM	
Athlete	Event	Opposition Score	Opposition Score	Rank	Opposition Score	Opposition Score	Opposition Score	Opposition Score	Rank
Souvananh Hacnolath	Singles	Hwang (KOR); L 0–4	Klomkamol (THA); L 1–4	3	Did not advance				

Mixed

Athlete	Event	Group stage				Second Stage	Quarter-finals	Semi-finals	Final / BM	
Athlete	Event	Opposition Score	Opposition Score	Opposition Score	Rank	Opposition Score	Opposition Score	Opposition Score	Opposition Score	Rank
Sataporn Simmalavong; Souvananh Hacnolath	Doubles	Sanger / Arasy (INA); L 1–5	Maeda / Maruyama (JPN); L 1–5	Kan / Yean (CAM); L 4–5	4	Did not advance				

== Swimming ==
Men

Athlete	Event	Heat		Final	
Athlete	Event	Time	Rank	Time	Rank
Ryuto Saysanavongphet	50 m freestyle	26.82	44	Did not advance	
Ryuto Saysanavongphet	100 m freestyle	59.72	41	Did not advance	
Ryuto Saysanavongphet	50 m butterfly	28.38	40	Did not advance	

Women

Athlete	Event	Heat		Final	
Athlete	Event	Time	Rank	Time	Rank
Tamsiri Christine Niyomxay	50 m freestyle	29.80	29	Did not advance	
Tamsiri Christine Niyomxay	100 m freestyle	1:06.70	33	Did not advance	
Tamsiri Christine Niyomxay	50 m breaststroke	DNS	—	Did not advance	
Tamsiri Christine Niyomxay	100 m breaststroke	1:25.87	25	Did not advance	

== Table tennis ==
Singles

Athlete	Event	Round of 64	Round of 32	Round of 16	Quarterfinals	Semifinals	Final	
Athlete	Event	Opposition Score	Opposition Score	Opposition Score	Opposition Score	Opposition Score	Opposition Score	Rank
Anane Vongsa	Men	Abdulhussein (QAT); L 1–4	Did not advance					
Johan Hagberg	Men	Pang (SGP); L 3–4	Did not advance					
Choutiphone Sisomboun	Women	Batmönkhiin (MGL); L 0–4	Did not advance					

Doubles

Athlete	Event	Round of 64	Round of 32	Round of 16	Quarterfinals	Semifinals	Final	
Athlete	Event	Opposition Score	Opposition Score	Opposition Score	Opposition Score	Opposition Score	Opposition Score	Rank
Anane Vongsa; Johan Hagberg	Men	Bye	Feng Y-h/ Kuo G-h (TPE); L 0–3	Did not advance				
Choutiphone Sisomboun; Xaysana Xaysavath	Mixed	Ridoy / Mahi (BAN); L 1–3	Did not advance					

Team

Team	Event	Group stage				Round of 16	Quarter-finals	Semi-finals	Final	
Team	Event	Opposition Score	Opposition Score	Opposition Score	Rank	Opposition Score	Opposition Score	Opposition Score	Opposition Score	Rank
Anane Vongsa; Johan Hagberg; Phongsavanh Sengmany; Xaysana Xaysavath	Men	Singapore; L 1–3	Bangladesh; W 3–1	Kazakhstan; L 1–3	3	Did not advance				

== Teqball ==
Singles

Athlete	Event	Group stage						Quarterfinal	Semifinal	Repechage	Final / BM	
Athlete	Event	Opposition Score	Opposition Score	Opposition Score	Opposition Score	Opposition Score	Rank	Opposition Score	Opposition Score	Opposition Score	Opposition Score	Rank
Alisa	Men	Lee J-s (KOR); L (1–12, 0–12)	Putra (INA); L (5–12, 6–12)	Wase (JPN); L (2–12, 3–12)	Agustin (PHI); W (11–12, 8–12)	Ba (VIE); W (5–12, 6–12)	6	Did not advance				

Doubles

Team	Event	Group stage						Quarterfinal	Semifinal	Repechage	Final / BM	
Team	Event	Opposition Score	Opposition Score	Opposition Score	Opposition Score	Opposition Score	Rank	Opposition Score	Opposition Score	Opposition Score	Opposition Score	Rank
Alisa; Chaitavanh Inthalapheth	Men	Radhi / Alelayawi (IRQ); L (2–12, 6–12)	Arabi / Hafez (LBN); L (4–12, 4–12)	—N/a			3	Did not advance				
Chaitavanh Inthalapheth; Seng Phonexay	Mixed	Radhi / Abed (LAO); L (8–12, 8–12)	Kim Eun-j / Jang E-s (KOR); W (12–10, 6–12, 12–10)	Nguyễn / Trịnh (VIE); L (7–12, 6–12)	Aidarbekov / Otorbaeva (KGZ); W (12–2, 12–6)	Sakamoto / Wase (JPN); L (6–12, 5–12)	4 Q	Dejaroen / Wongkhamchan (THA); L (2–12, 5–12)	Did not advance	Bun / Yorn (CAM); L (5–12, 3–12)	Did not advance	

== Wushu ==
=== Sanda ===
Men

Athlete	Event	Round of 16	Quarter-finals	Semi-finals	Final	
Athlete	Event	Opposition Score	Opposition Score	Opposition Score	Opposition Score	Rank
Hongpaseuth Oudomdeth	–65 kg	Nguyễn (VIE); L 0–2	Did not advance			
Phonh Saibounpheng	–70 kg	Khakimov (KGZ); L 0–2	Did not advance			
Anong Teunchaleun	–75 kg	Abdullayev (KAZ); L 0–2	Did not advance			

Women

Athlete	Event	Round of 16	Quarter-finals	Semi-finals	Final	
Athlete	Event	Opposition Score	Opposition Score	Opposition Score	Opposition Score	Rank
Alisa Xaiyasit	–52 kg	Nurmamatova (UZB); W 2–0	Wu (CHN); L PD	Did not advance		
