= Karate at the 2026 Asian Games – Women's kata =

Women's kata at the 2026 Asian Games
- Venue: Toyohashi City General Gymnasium
- Date: 20 September 2026
- Competitors: 15 from 15 nations

Medalists
gold medal	Maho Ono	Japan
silver medal	Grace Lau	Hong Kong
bronze medal	Bùi Ngọc Nhi	Vietnam
bronze medal	Chien Hui-hsuan	Chinese Taipei

The women's individual kata competition at the 2026 Asian Games took place on 20 September 2026 at Toyohashi City General Gymnasium, Toyohashi. Maho Ono of Japan defeated Hong Kong's Grace Lau 5–0 in the final to win the gold medal.

== Schedule ==
All times are Japan Standard Time (UTC+09:00)

Date	Time	Event
Sunday, 20 September 2026	10:00	Round of 16
Sunday, 20 September 2026	10:00	Quarterfinals
Sunday, 20 September 2026	10:00	Semifinals
Sunday, 20 September 2026	10:00	Repechage
Sunday, 20 September 2026	10:00	Bronze medal bouts
Sunday, 20 September 2026	10:00	Final

== Results ==
=== Main bracket ===
Round of 16
Maho Ono (JPN)	5
Bùi Ngọc Nhi (VIE)	0
Choi Ha-eun (KOR)	5
Sanu Maya Thing (NEP)	0
Chu On Kei (MAC)	5
Yalaltyn Misheel (MGL)	0
That Chhenghorng (CAM)	1
Shannon Leong (SGP)	4
Chien Hui-hsuan (TPE)	4
Marzella Sekar Damayanti (INA)	1
Dalal Al-Saied (KUW)	2
Rebecca Torres (PHI)	3
Fatemeh Sadeghi (IRI)	5
Monsicha Sakulrattanatara (THA)	0

Quarterfinals
Maho Ono (JPN)	5
Choi Ha-eun (KOR)	0
Chu On Kei (MAC)	1
Shannon Leong (SGP)	4
Chien Hui-hsuan (TPE)	4
Rebecca Torres (PHI)	1
Fatemeh Sadeghi (IRI)	0
Grace Lau (HKG)	5

Semifinals
Maho Ono (JPN)	5
Shannon Leong (SGP)	0
Chien Hui-hsuan (TPE)	0
Grace Lau (HKG)	5

Final
Maho Ono (JPN)	5
Grace Lau (HKG)	0

=== Repechage ===
Repechage round 1
Bùi Ngọc Nhi (VIE)	5
Choi Ha-eun (KOR)	0

Bronze medal bouts
Bùi Ngọc Nhi (VIE)	4
Shannon Leong (SGP)	1
Fatemeh Sadeghi (IRI)	1
Chien Hui-hsuan (TPE)	4
