= Mohammad Anas (teqball) =

Indian Teqball player

Personal information
- Full name: Mohammad Anas Imran Beg
- Nationality: Indian

Sport
- Country: India
- Sport: Teqball

Mohammad Anas Imran Beg is an Indian teqball player. He qualified and represented India in men's doubles and mixed doubles event at the 2026 Asian Games.

== Career ==
In 2024, Beg partnered with Declan Gonsalves, to win a bronze medal at the 2024 Teqball World Championships in Vietnam. This was India's first ever medal at the World Championships.

Teqball made its debut at the Asian Games in the 2026 edition at Japan. He represented India in the men's doubles and mixed doubles events. In the mixed doubles, the Indian team of Beg and Quimcy Dsouza reached the quarterfinals. Though the duo lost the quarterfinals, they defeated Philippines in the repechage round to advance to the bronze medal match. In the men's doubles event, the Indian duo of Beg and Gonsalves lost both the preliminary matches in Group B, going down 0–2 to Vietnam and South Korea, and did not progress to the quarterfinals.
