= Karate at the 2026 Asian Games – Women's kumite 55 kg =

Women's kumite 55 kg at the 2026 Asian Games
- Venue: Toyohashi City General Gymnasium
- Date: 22 September 2026
- Competitors: 11 from 11 nations

Medalists
gold medal	Adeola Fay Robert	Malaysia
silver medal	Fatemeh Zahra Saeidabadi	Iran
bronze medal	Cok Istri Agung Sanistyarani	Indonesia
bronze medal	Bella Samasheva	Kazakhstan

The women's kumite 55 kilograms competition at the 2026 Asian Games took place on 22 September 2026 at Toyohashi City General Gymnasium, Toyohashi. Adeola Fay Robert of Malaysia defeated Iran's Fatemeh Zahra Saeidabadi in the final to win the gold medal, giving Malaysia its first gold medal of the Games.

== Schedule ==
All times are Japan Standard Time (UTC+09:00)

Date	Time	Event
Tuesday, 22 September 2026	12:40	Round of 16
Tuesday, 22 September 2026	12:40	Quarterfinals
Tuesday, 22 September 2026	12:40	Semifinals
Tuesday, 22 September 2026	12:40	Repechage
Tuesday, 22 September 2026	12:40	Bronze medal bouts
Tuesday, 22 September 2026	16:20	Final

== Results ==
=== Main bracket ===
Round of 16
Fatemeh Zahra Saeidabadi (IRI)	8
Pa Torvanhxai (LAO)	0
Alisha Choudhary (IND)	1
Cok Istri Agung Sanistyarani (INA)	6
Asrar Jasem (KUW)	1
Adeola Fay Robert (MAS)	9

Quarterfinals
Fatemeh Zahra Saeidabadi (IRI)	9
Marissa Hafezan (SGP)	1
Cok Istri Agung Sanistyarani (INA)	8
Lei Hong Kio (MAC)	5
Adeola Fay Robert (MAS)	8
Sevinch Rakhimova (UZB)	7
Ku Tsui-ping (TPE)	0
Bella Samasheva (KAZ)	2

Semifinals
Fatemeh Zahra Saeidabadi (IRI)	8
Cok Istri Agung Sanistyarani (INA)	0
Adeola Fay Robert (MAS)	5
Bella Samasheva (KAZ)	4

Final
Fatemeh Zahra Saeidabadi (IRI)	4
Adeola Fay Robert (MAS)	6

=== Repechage ===
Repechage round 1
Pa Torvanhxai (LAO)	0
Marissa Hafezan (SGP)	2
Asrar Jasem (KUW)	1
Sevinch Rakhimova (UZB)	3

Bronze medal bouts
Marissa Hafezan (SGP)	3
Cok Istri Agung Sanistyarani (INA)	7
Sevinch Rakhimova (UZB)	0
Bella Samasheva (KAZ)	0
