= Teqball at the 2026 Asian Games – Women's doubles =

Women's doubles teqball event at the 2026 Asian Games

Women's doubles at the 2026 Asian Games
- Venue: Higashi Sports Center
- Dates: 18–20 September 2026
- Competitors: 8 from 4 nations

Medalists
| gold medal | Jutatip Kuntatong; Suphawadi Wongkhamchan | Thailand |
| silver medal | Hsu Mon Aung; Phyu Phyu Than | Myanmar |
| bronze medal | Yorn Sophornraksmey; Mey Sreymeas | Cambodia |
| bronze medal | Maria Chedid; Kamar Dandal | Lebanon |

The women's doubles teqball competition at the 2026 Asian Games was held from 18 to 20 September 2026 at the Nagoya City Higashi Sports Center in Nagoya, Japan. It was part of teqball's debut as a medal sport at the Asian Games.

Four pairs representing four nations competed in a single round-robin group. All four pairs advanced to the semifinals. The first-ranked pair faced the fourth-ranked pair, while the second-ranked pair faced the third-ranked pair.

Thailand defeated Cambodia 12–5, 12–4 in the first semifinal, while Myanmar defeated Lebanon 12–11, 12–1 in the other semifinal. Thailand then defeated Myanmar 12–6, 12–3 in the gold medal match, completing the competition without losing a set. Lebanon and Cambodia won the bronze medals as the losing semifinalists.

== Schedule ==
All times are Japan Standard Time (UTC+09:00)

| Date | Time | Event |
|---|---|---|
| Friday, 18 September 2026 | 11:30 | Group stage |
| Saturday, 19 September 2026 | 10:30 | Semifinals |
| Sunday, 20 September 2026 | 17:10 | Gold medal match |

== Results ==
=== Group stage ===
| Pos | Team | Pld | W | L | SF | SA | SD | Pts | Qualification |
|---|---|---|---|---|---|---|---|---|---|
| 1 | Jutatip Kuntatong (THA) Suphawadi Wongkhamchan (THA) | 3 | 3 | 0 | 6 | 0 | +6 | 6 | Semifinals |
| 2 | Hsu Mon Aung (MYA) Phyu Phyu Than (MYA) | 3 | 2 | 1 | 4 | 2 | +2 | 5 | Semifinals |
| 3 | Maria Chedid (LBN) Kamar Dandal (LBN) | 3 | 1 | 2 | 2 | 4 | −2 | 4 | Semifinals |
| 4 | Yorn Sophornraksmey (CAM) Mey Sreymeas (CAM) | 3 | 0 | 3 | 0 | 6 | −6 | 3 | Semifinals |

Source: FITEQ

| | Score | | Set 1 | Set 2 | Set 3 |
|---|---|---|---|---|---|
| Jutatip Kuntatong (THA); Suphawadi Wongkhamchan (THA) | 2–0 | Hsu Mon Aung (MYA); Phyu Phyu Than (MYA) | 12–2 | 12–8 | |
| Maria Chedid (LBN); Kamar Dandal (LBN) | 2–0 | Yorn Sophornraksmey (CAM); Mey Sreymeas (CAM) | 12–7 | 12–8 | |
| Jutatip Kuntatong (THA); Suphawadi Wongkhamchan (THA) | 2–0 | Maria Chedid (LBN); Kamar Dandal (LBN) | 12–7 | 12–4 | |
| Hsu Mon Aung (MYA); Phyu Phyu Than (MYA) | 2–0 | Yorn Sophornraksmey (CAM); Mey Sreymeas (CAM) | 12–3 | 12–7 | |
| Maria Chedid (LBN); Kamar Dandal (LBN) | 0–2 | Hsu Mon Aung (MYA); Phyu Phyu Than (MYA) | 9–12 | 6–12 | |
| Jutatip Kuntatong (THA); Suphawadi Wongkhamchan (THA) | 2–0 | Yorn Sophornraksmey (CAM); Mey Sreymeas (CAM) | 12–2 | 12–2 | |

=== Knockout stage ===
| Semifinals | | | Gold medal match |
| Jutatip Kuntatong (THA); Suphawadi Wongkhamchan (THA) | 12 | 12 |
| Yorn Sophornraksmey (CAM); Mey Sreymeas (CAM) | 5 | 4 | Jutatip Kuntatong (THA); Suphawadi Wongkhamchan (THA) | 12 | 12 |
| Maria Chedid (LBN); Kamar Dandal (LBN) | 11 | 1 | Hsu Mon Aung (MYA); Phyu Phyu Than (MYA) | 6 | 3 |
| Hsu Mon Aung (MYA); Phyu Phyu Than (MYA) | 12 | 12 |
