= Iraq at the 2026 Asian Games =

- IOC code: IRQ
- NOC: Iraqi Olympic Committee

in Aichi–Nagoya, Japan September 19 – October 4, 2026
- Competitors: 14 in 7 sports
- Medals Ranked 30th: Gold 0 Silver 2 Bronze 3 Total 5

Asian Games appearances (overview)
- 1974; 1978; 1982; 1986; 1990–2002; 2006; 2010; 2014; 2018; 2022; 2026

Iraq is scheduled to compete at the 2026 Asian Games in Aichi Prefecture and Nagoya, Japan from September 19 to October 4, 2026.

== Medal summary ==
Medal	Name	Sport	Event	Date
Silver	Ali Jalil Mezher Alelayawi	Teqball	Men's singles	20 September
Bronze	Abdulrahman Ahmed Radhi; Samah Shakir Abed	Teqball	Mixed doubles	20 September
Bronze	Abdulrahman Ahmed Radhi; Ali Jalil Mezher Alelayawi	Teqball	Men's doubles	20 September

Medals by sport
Sport	1st place, gold medalist(s)	2nd place, silver medalist(s)	3rd place, bronze medalist(s)	Total
Teqball	0	1	2	3
Weightlifting	0	1	0	1
Wrestling	0	0	1	1
Total	0	2	3	5

Medals by gender
Gender	1st place, gold medalist(s)	2nd place, silver medalist(s)	3rd place, bronze medalist(s)	Total
Male	0	1	1	2
Mixed	0	0	1	1
Total	0	1	2	3

Medals by date
Date	1st place, gold medalist(s)	2nd place, silver medalist(s)	3rd place, bronze medalist(s)	Total
20 September	0	1	2	3
Total	0	1	2	3

== Competitors ==
The following is a list of the number of competitors representing Iraq that will participate at the Asian Games:

Sport	Men	Women	Total
Athletics	2	0	2
Boxing	3	0	3
Ju-jitsu	1	0	1
Rowing	2	0	2
Teqball	2	1	3
Weightlifting	1	0	1
Wrestling	2	0	2
Total	13	1	14

== Athletics ==
Key

- Note–Ranks given for track events are within the athlete's heat only
- Q = Qualified for the next round
- q = Qualified for the next round as a fastest loser or, in field events, by position without achieving the qualifying target
- NR = National record
- N/A = Round not applicable for the event
- Bye = Athlete not required to compete in round

Field events

Athlete	Event	Final	
Athlete	Event	Distance	Position
Mustafa Kadhim	Men's discus throw	54.16	11

== Boxing ==
Athlete	Event	Round of 32	Round of 16	Quarterfinals	Semifinals	Final	
Athlete	Event	Opposition Result	Opposition Result	Opposition Result	Opposition Result	Opposition Result	Rank
Abbas Qasim Al-Sarray	Men's 55 kg	Prasanna (SRI); W RSC	Shin J-y (KOR); L WO	Did not advance			
Mohammed Shijlawi	Men's 60 kg	Budhahei (BHR); W 5–0	Kitamoto (JPN); L 0–5	Did not advance			
Ali Qasim Al-Sarray	Men's 70 kg	Darlami (NEP); W 5–0	Kundu (IND); W RSC-I	Sabyrkhan (KAZ); L KO	Did not advance		

== Ju-jitsu ==
Athlete	Event	Round of 32	Round of 16	Quarterfinals	Semifinals	Repechage	Final / BM	
Athlete	Event	Opposition Result	Opposition Result	Opposition Result	Opposition Result	Opposition Result	Opposition Result	Rank
Amro Mohammed Fadhil Al-Sammarraie	Men's –77 kg	–	–	–	–	–	–	

== Rowing ==
Athlete	Event	Heats		Final	
Athlete	Event	Time	Rank	Time	Rank
Bakr Shihab	Men's single sculls	DNS		Did not advance	
Bakr Shihab; Mohammed Riyadh	Men's double sculls	6:17.81	5 FA	6:14.93	5

Qualification Legend: FA=Final A (medal); FB=Final B (non-medal)

== Teqball ==
Singles

Athlete	Event	Group stage					Quarterfinal	Semifinal	Repechage	Final / BM	
Athlete	Event	Opposition Score	Opposition Score	Opposition Score	Opposition Score	Rank	Opposition Score	Opposition Score	Opposition Score	Opposition Score	Rank
Ali Jalil Mezher Alelayawi	Men	Ganzorig (MGL); W (12–1, 12–2)	Aidarbekov (KGZ); W (12–2, 12–2)	Eidan (KUW); W (12–8, 12–7)	Saw (MYA); W (12–10, 12–4)	1 Q	Agustin (PHI); W (12–6, 12–2)	Saw (MYA); W (12–11, 12–11)	—N/a	Lee J-s (KOR); L (11–12, 5–12)	2nd place, silver medalist(s)

Doubles

Team	Event	Group stage						Quarterfinal	Semifinal	Repechage	Final / BM	
Team	Event	Opposition Score	Opposition Score	Opposition Score	Opposition Score	Opposition Score	Rank	Opposition Score	Opposition Score	Opposition Score	Opposition Score	Rank
Abdulrahman Ahmed Radhi; Ali Jalil Mezher Alelayawi	Men	Alisa / Inthalapheth (LAO); W (12–2, 12–6)	Arabi / Hafez (LBN); W (12–8, 12–8)	—N/a			1 Q	Lee J-s / Lee T-b (KOR); W (12–9, 12–7)	Thaosiri / Chanliang (THA); L (3–12, 11–12)	—N/a	Ba / Lê (VIE); W (7–12, 12–9, 12–7)	3rd place, bronze medalist(s)
Abdulrahman Ahmed Radhi; Samah Shakir Abed	Mixed	Inthalapheth / Phonexay (LAO); W (12–8, 12–8)	Nguyễn / Trịnh (VIE); W (12–11, 12–7)	Aidarbekov / Otorbaeva (KGZ); W (12–4, 12–8)	Sakamoto / Wase (JPN); W (12–10, 12–11)	Kim Eun-j / Jang E-s (KOR); L (12–8, 11–12, 9–12)	1 Q	Abulencia / Agustin (PHI); W (12–3, 12–4)	Sakamoto / Wase (JPN); L (12–10, 10–12, 9–12)	—N/a	Bun / Yorn (CAM); W (11–12, 12–11, 12–9)	3rd place, bronze medalist(s)

== Weightlifting ==
Athlete	Event	Snatch		Clean & Jerk		Total	Rank
Athlete	Event	Result	Rank	Result	Rank	Total	Rank
Ali Ammar	Men's +110 kg						

== Wrestling ==
Iraq entered two wrestlers.

Key:

- VT (ranking points: 5–0 or 0–5) – Victory by fall.
- VB (ranking points: 5–0 or 0–5) – Victory by injury (VF for forfeit, VA for withdrawal or disqualification)
- PP (ranking points: 3–1 or 1–3) – Decision by points – the loser with technical points.
- PO (ranking points: 3–0 or 0–3) – Decision by points – the loser without technical points.
- ST (ranking points: 4–0 or 0–4) – Great superiority – the loser without technical points and a margin of victory of at least 8 (Greco-Roman) or 10 (freestyle) points.
- SP (ranking points: 4–1 or 1–4) – Technical superiority – the loser with technical points and a margin of victory of at least 8 (Greco-Roman) or 10 (freestyle) points.

Freestyle

Athlete	Event	Round of 32	Round of 16	Quarterfinal	Semifinal	Repechage	Final / BM	
Athlete	Event	Opposition Result	Opposition Result	Opposition Result	Opposition Result	Opposition Result	Opposition Result	Rank
Hussein Khudhur	Men's −57 kg	Uulu (KGZ); L 0–10 ^{ST}	Did not advance					

Greco-Roman

Athlete	Event	Round of 16	Quarterfinal	Semifinal	Repechage	Final / BM	
Athlete	Event	Opposition Result	Opposition Result	Opposition Result	Opposition Result	Opposition Result	Rank
Sajjad Ali	Men's −60 kg	Azizov (TJK); W 8–0 ^{ST}	Nguyễn (VIE); W 7–0 ^{VT}	Sharshenbekov (KGZ); L 0–8 ^{ST}	Did not advance		
