= Lebanon at the 2026 Asian Games =

- IOC code: LBN
- NOC: Lebanese Olympic Committee

in Aichi Prefecture and Nagoya, Japan 19 September 2026 – 4 October 2026
- Competitors: 39 (23 men and 16 women) in 18 sports
- Flag bearers: Michael Yared & Maria Chedid
- Medals Ranked 32nd: Gold 0 Silver 1 Bronze 2 Total 3

Asian Games appearances (overview)
- 1978; 1982; 1986; 1990; 1994; 1998; 2002; 2006; 2010; 2014; 2018; 2022; 2026

Lebanon is scheduled to competed at the 2026 Asian Games in Aichi Prefecture and Nagoya, Japan, from 19 September to 4 October 2026.

== Medal summary ==
Medal	Name	Sport	Event	Date
2nd place, silver medalist(s)	Ahmad Kassem Arabi; Mohamad Hafez	Teqball	Men's doubles	20 September
Bronze	Kamar Dandal; Maria Chedid	Teqball	Women's doubles	19 September

Medals by sport
Sport	1st place, gold medalist(s)	2nd place, silver medalist(s)	3rd place, bronze medalist(s)	Total
Teqball	0	1	1	2
Total	0	1	1	2

Medals by gender
Gender	1st place, gold medalist(s)	2nd place, silver medalist(s)	3rd place, bronze medalist(s)	Total
Male	0	1	0	1
Female	0	0	1	1
Total	0	1	1	2

Medals by date
Date	1st place, gold medalist(s)	2nd place, silver medalist(s)	3rd place, bronze medalist(s)	Total
19 September	0	0	1	1
20 September	0	1	0	1
Total	0	1	1	2

== Competitors ==
The following is the list of number of competitors in the Games.

Sport	Men	Women	Total
Archery	3	1	4
Athletics	1	1	2
Equestrian	0	1	1
Fencing	2	1	3
Judo	1	1	2
Modern pentathlon	1	0	1
Padel	2	2	4
Rowing	1	0	1
Rowing	4	0	4
Squash	1	0	1
Surfing	2	0	2
Swimming	1	1	2
Table tennis	0	3	3
Taekwondo	0	1	1
Teqball	2	2	4
Triathlon	1	0	1
Weightlifting	0	2	2
Wrestling	1	0	1
Total	23	16	39

== Archery ==
Recurve

Athlete	Event	Ranking round		Round of 48	Round of 32	Round of 16	Quarterfinals	Semifinals	Final / BM	
Athlete	Event	Score	Seed	Opposition Score	Opposition Score	Opposition Score	Opposition Score	Opposition Score	Opposition Score	Rank
Marianne Allam	Women's individual	585	47 Q	Bekbalieva (KGZ); L 5–6	Did not advance					

Compound

Athlete	Event	Ranking round		Round of 32	Round of 16	Quarterfinals	Semifinals	Final / BM	
Athlete	Event	Score	Seed	Opposition Score	Opposition Score	Opposition Score	Opposition Score	Opposition Score	Rank
Wadih Bartah Mattar	Men's individual	674	40 Q	Dorji (BHU); L 135–147	Did not advance				

== Athletics ==
Key

- Note–Ranks given for track events are within the athlete's heat only
- Q = Qualified for the next round
- q = Qualified for the next round as a fastest loser or, in field events, by position without achieving the qualifying target
- NR = National record
- N/A = Round not applicable for the event
- Bye = Athlete not required to compete in round

Track events

Athlete	Event	Heat		Semifinal		Final	
Athlete	Event	Result	Rank	Result	Rank	Result	Rank
Noureddine Hadid	Men's 100 m	10.74	6	Did not advance			
Noureddine Hadid	Men's 200 m	21.53	6 q	21.48	6	Did not advance	
Aziza Sbaity	Women's 100 m	11.89	5 q	11.81	7	Did not advance	
Aziza Sbaity	Women's 200 m	24.33	6	—N/a		Did not advance	

== Equestrian ==
=== Dressage ===
Athlete	Horse	Event	Grand Prix		Grand Prix Freestyle		Overall	
Athlete	Horse	Event	Score	Rank	Technical	Artistic	Score	Rank
Catherine Haddad		Individual						

Qualification Legend: Q = Qualified for the final; q = Qualified for the final as a lucky loser

== Fencing ==
Athlete	Event	Round of 64	Round of 32	Round of 16	Quarterfinal	Semifinal	Final / BM	
Athlete	Event	Opposition Score	Opposition Score	Opposition Score	Opposition Score	Opposition Score	Opposition Score	Rank
Antoine Elchoueiri	Men's épée	–	–	–	–	–	–	–
Philippe Wakim	Men's foil	–	–	–	–	–	–	–
Sasha Salameh	Women's épée	—N/a	–	–	–	–	–	–

== Gymnastics ==
=== Artistic ===
Women

Athlete	Event	Qualification						Final					
Athlete	Event	Apparatus				Total	Rank	Apparatus				Total	Rank
Athlete	Event	V	UB	BB	F	Total	Rank	V	UB	BB	F	Total	Rank
Sara Mroueh	Individual all-around	—N/a						11.500	7.000	8.766	10.000	37.266	28

== Judo ==
Athlete	Event	Round of 16	Quarterfinals	Semifinals	Repechage	Final / BM	
Athlete	Event	Opposition Result	Opposition Result	Opposition Result	Opposition Result	Opposition Result	Rank
Caramnob Sagaipov	Men's –90 kg	–	–	–	–	–	
Aqulina Chayeb	Women's –78 kg	–	–	–	–	–	

== Modern pentathlon ==
Athlete	Event		Fencing (épée one touch)			Fencing (Direct Elimination)		Obstacle run			Swimming (100 m freestyle)			Combined: shooting/running (10 m laser pistol)/(3000 m)			Total points	Final rank
Athlete	Event		V	D	Rank	Rank	MP Points	Penalties	Rank	MP points	Time	Rank	MP points	Time	Rank	MP points	Total points	Final rank
Michael Yared	Men's individual	Semifinal	22	13	8 (of 36)	4	236	0	10	345	1:14	16	229	14:24	18	436	1246	16
Michael Yared	Men's individual	Final	22	13	8 (of 36)	Did not advance												

== Padel ==
Athlete	Event	First round	Second round	Quarterfinals	Semifinals	Final / BM	
Athlete	Event	Opposition Result	Opposition Result	Opposition Result	Opposition Result	Opposition Result	Rank
Tamim El Hallak; Ralph Adel Tohme	Men's pairs	Ando / Nakamura (JPN); L 1–2	Did not advance				
Lilya Messaike; Maria Breidy	Women's pairs	Janahi / Alawadhi (UAE); L 0–2	Did not advance				

== Rowing ==
Athlete	Event	Heats		Final	
Athlete	Event	Time	Rank	Time	Rank
Youssef El Mays	Men's lightweight single sculls	8:20.10	6 FB	7:46.52	11

Qualification Legend: FA=Final A (medal); FB=Final B (non-medal)

== Shooting ==
Athlete	Event	Qualification		Final	
Athlete	Event	Points	Rank	Points	Rank
Alain Moussa	Men's trap	111	26	Did not advance	
Ghassan Baaklini	Men's trap	116	11	Did not advance	
Mario Kozhaya	Men's trap	112	23	Did not advance	
Alain Moussa; Ghassan Baaklini; Mario Kozhaya	Men's trap team	—N/a		339	5
Samer Sarkis	Men's skeet	115	14	Did not advance	

== Squash ==
Athlete	Event	Round of 64	Round of 32	Round of 16	Quarter-finals	Semi-finals	Final / BM	
Athlete	Event	Opposition Result	Opposition Result	Opposition Result	Opposition Result	Opposition Result	Opposition Result	Rank
Jason Karam	Men's singles	Bye	Irfan (PAK); L 0–3	Did not advance				

== Surfing ==
Athlete	Event	Round 1		Round 2	Round 3	Quarter-finals	Semi-finals	Final / BM	
Athlete	Event	Score	Rank	Opposition Result	Opposition Result	Opposition Result	Opposition Result	Opposition Result	Rank
Christopher Dirany	Men's shortboard	2.97	3 R2	Ma (CHN); L 4.96–15.10	Did not advance				
Rayan Hakawati	Men's shortboard	3.07	3 R2	Wehle (MAS); L 5.30–7.34	Did not advance				

Qualification legend: R3 - Qualifies to elimination rounds; R2 - Qualifies to repechage round

== Swimming ==
Athlete	Event	Heat		Final	
Athlete	Event	Time	Rank	Time	Rank
Munzer Kabbara	Men's 200 m backstroke	DNS	—	Did not advance	
Munzer Kabbara	Men's 50 m butterfly	DNS	—	Did not advance	
Munzer Kabbara	Men's 100 m butterfly	DNS	—	Did not advance	
Munzer Kabbara	Men's 200 m butterfly	DNS	—	Did not advance	
Munzer Kabbara	Men's 200 m individual medley	DNS	—	Did not advance	
Munzer Kabbara	Men's 400 m individual medley	DNS	—	Did not advance	
Lynn El Hajj	Women's 50 m breaststroke	33.20	15	Did not advance	
Lynn El Hajj	Women's 100 m breaststroke	1:10.28	11	Did not advance	
Lynn El Hajj	Women's 200 m breaststroke	2:32.11	7 Q	2:31.33	7

== Table tennis ==
Women

Athlete	Event	Round of 64	Round of 32	Round of 16	Quarterfinals	Semifinals	Final	
Athlete	Event	Opposition Score	Opposition Score	Opposition Score	Opposition Score	Opposition Score	Opposition Score	Rank
Bissam Chiri	Singles	Abboud (SYR); L 0–4	Did not advance					
Talia Azar	Singles	Sawettabut (THA); L 0–4	Did not advance					
Bissam Chiri; Talia Azar	Doubles	Bye	Sawettabut / Paranang (THA); L 0–3	Did not advance				

Team

Athlete	Event	Group stage				Round of 16	Quarterfinal	Semifinal	Final	
Athlete	Event	Opposition Score	Opposition Score	Opposition Score	Rank	Opposition Score	Opposition Score	Opposition Score	Opposition Score	Rank
Bissan Chiri; Laetitia Azar; Talia Azar	Women	Hong Kong; L 0–3	Qatar; W 3–2	Thailand; L 0–3	3	Did not advance				

== Taekwondo ==
Athlete	Event	Round of 16	Quarterfinals	Semifinals	Final	
Athlete	Event	Opposition Result	Opposition Result	Opposition Result	Opposition Result	Rank
Laetitia Aoun	Women's –57 kg	–	–	–	–	

== Teqball ==
Singles

Athlete	Event	Group stage				Quarterfinal	Semifinal	Final / BM	
Athlete	Event	Opposition Score	Opposition Score	Opposition Score	Rank	Opposition Score	Opposition Score	Opposition Score	Rank
Kamar Dandal	Women	Sumaya (INA); L (9–12, 11–12)	Otorbaeva (KGZ); W (12–7, 12–3)	Khin Hnin (MYA); L (7–12, 4–12)	3 Q	Sakamoto (JPN); W (12–9, 12–7)	Khin Hnin (MYA); L (7–12, 8–12)	Dy (CAM); L (10–12, 12–10, 6–12)	5

Doubles

Team	Event	Group stage				Quarterfinal	Semifinal	Repechage	Final / BM	
Team	Event	Opposition Score	Opposition Score	Opposition Score	Rank	Opposition Score	Opposition Score	Opposition Score	Opposition Score	Rank
Ahmad Kassem Arabi; Mohamad Hafez	Men	Radhi / Alelayawi (IRQ); L (8–12, 8–12)	Alisa / Inthalapheth (LAO); W (12–4, 12–4)	—N/a	2 Q	Ba / Lê (VIE); W (12–7, 12–10)	Ahmad / Alqattan (KUW); W (12–9, 11–12, 12–9)	—N/a	Thaosiri / Chanliang (THA) (7–12, 4–12)	2nd place, silver medalist(s)
Kamar Dandal; Maria Chedid	Women	Yorn / Mey (CAM); W (12–7, 12–8)	Kuntatong / Wongkhamchan (THA); L (7–12, 8–12)	Hsu Mon / Phyu Phyu (MYA); L (9–12, 6–12)	3 Q	—N/a	Hsu Mon / Phyu Phyu (MYA) (11–12, 1–12)	—N/a	Did not advance	3rd place, bronze medalist(s)

== Triathlon ==
Athlete	Event	Time						Rank
Athlete	Event	Swim (0.75 km)	Trans 1	Bike (20 km)	Trans 2	Run (5 km)	Total	Rank
Adoh Doherty	Men's individual	9:35	0:39	28:24	0:19	17:01	55:58	14

== Weightlifting ==
Athlete	Event	Snatch		Clean & Jerk		Total	Rank
Athlete	Event	Result	Rank	Result	Rank	Total	Rank
Nadia Elizabeth El Samman	Women's −53 kg	Did not start					
Alexa Mina	Women's −69 kg	88	10	102	10	190	10

== Wrestling ==
Lebanon entered one wrestler.

Key:

- VT (ranking points: 5–0 or 0–5) – Victory by fall.
- VB (ranking points: 5–0 or 0–5) – Victory by injury (VF for forfeit, VA for withdrawal or disqualification)
- PP (ranking points: 3–1 or 1–3) – Decision by points – the loser with technical points.
- PO (ranking points: 3–0 or 0–3) – Decision by points – the loser without technical points.
- ST (ranking points: 4–0 or 0–4) – Great superiority – the loser without technical points and a margin of victory of at least 8 (Greco-Roman) or 10 (freestyle) points.
- SP (ranking points: 4–1 or 1–4) – Technical superiority – the loser with technical points and a margin of victory of at least 8 (Greco-Roman) or 10 (freestyle) points.

Greco-Roman

Athlete	Event	Round of 16	Quarterfinal	Semifinal	Repechage	Final / BM	
Athlete	Event	Opposition Result	Opposition Result	Opposition Result	Opposition Result	Opposition Result	Rank
Mohamad Hussein Awarke	Men's −87 kg	Roberts (PHI); L WO	Did not advance				
