= Myanmar at the 2026 Asian Games =

- IOC code: MYA
- NOC: Myanmar Olympic Committee

in Aichi Prefecture and Nagoya, Japan 19 September 2026 – 4 October 2026
- Competitors: 59 (29 men and 30 women) in 5 sports
- Medals Ranked 24th: Gold 2 Silver 1 Bronze 2 Total 5

Asian Games appearances (overview)
- 1951; 1954; 1958; 1962; 1966; 1970; 1974; 1978; 1982; 1986; 1990; 1994; 1998; 2002; 2006; 2010; 2014; 2018; 2022; 2026

Myanmar competed at the 2026 Asian Games in Aichi Prefecture and Nagoya, Japan, held from 19 September to 4 October 2026.

== Medal summary ==
Medal	Name	Sport	Event	Date
Gold	Khin Hnin Wai	Teqball	Women's singles	20 September
Gold	Han Htoo Swe; Hein Htet Oo; Kyaw Thuya; Myo Myint Ko Ko Kyaw; Shine Lin Aung	Esports	Mobile Legends: Bang Bang	1 October
Silver	Hsu Mon Aung; Phyu Phyu Than	Teqball	Women's doubles	20 September
Bronze	Saw Friday	Teqball	Men's singles	20 September

Medals by sport
Sport	1st place, gold medalist(s)	2nd place, silver medalist(s)	3rd place, bronze medalist(s)	Total
Teqball	1	1	1	3
Esports	1	0	0	1
Sepak takraw				
Total	2	1	1	4

Medals by gender
Gender	1st place, gold medalist(s)	2nd place, silver medalist(s)	3rd place, bronze medalist(s)	Total
Female	1	1	0	2
Male	1	0	1	2
Total	2	1	1	4

Medals by date
Date	1st place, gold medalist(s)	2nd place, silver medalist(s)	3rd place, bronze medalist(s)	Total
20 September	1	1	1	3
1 October	1	0	0	1
October				
Total	2	1	1	4

== Competitors ==
The following is the list of number of competitors in the Games.

Sport	Men	Women	Total
Esports	17	0	17
Football	0	23	23
Gymnastics	0	1	1
Sepak takraw	11	3	14
Teqball	1	3	4
Total	29	30	59

== Esports ==
eFootball

Gamer	Event	Group stage		Rank	Quarter-final	Semi-final	Final	Rank
Gamer	Event	Opposition Score	Opposition Score	Rank	Opposition Score	Opposition Score	Opposition Score	Rank
Min Thant Naing; Wai Phyo Kyaw	eFootball	Jordan (JOR); L 0–2	Bahrain (BRN); D 1–1	2	Did not advance			

Honor of Kings

Gamer	Event	Group stage	Rank	Quarter-final	Semi-final	Final	Rank
Gamer	Event	Opposition Score	Rank	Opposition Score	Opposition Score	Opposition Score	Rank
Eant Htoo Myat; Min Khant Aung Maw; Sai Aung Pyae Phyo; Sai Boon Lyaung Hein; Zin Min Htet	Honor of Kings	South Korea (KOR); L 0–2	2 Q	Malaysia (MAS); L 0–2	Did not advance		

MLBB

Gamer	Event	Group stage		Rank	Quarter-final	Semi-final	Final	Rank
Gamer	Event	Opposition Score	Opposition Score	Rank	Opposition Score	Opposition Score	Opposition Score	Rank
Han Htoo Swe; Hein Htet Oo; Kyaw Thuya; Myo Myint Ko Ko Kyaw Shine Lin Aung	Mobile Legends: Bang Bang	Uzbekistan (UZB); W 2–0	Hong Kong (HKG); W 2–0	1 Q	Cambodia (CAM); W 2–1	Malaysia (MAS); W 2–0	Indonesia (INA); W 4–0	1st place, gold medalist(s)

PUBG Mobile - Asian Games Version

Athlete	Event	Final	Rank
Aung Soe Oo; Kaung Khant Aung; Khant Zaw Hein; Soung Wai Phyo; Swam Mint Maung	PUBG Mobile - Asian Games Version		

== Football ==
Summary

Key:

- A.E.T – After extra time.
- P – Match decided by penalty-shootout.

Team	Event	Group Stage				Quarterfinal	Semifinal	Final / BM	
Team	Event	Opposition Score	Opposition Score	Opposition Score	Rank	Opposition Score	Opposition Score	Opposition Score	Rank
Myanmar	Women's tournament	South Korea; L 0–5	North Korea; L 0–8	Bangladesh –	—N/a	—N/a	—N/a	—N/a	—N/a

=== Women's tournament ===
Team roster

The following players list is the Myanmar squad for the 2026 Asian Games.

Head Coach: (England) Colin Bell

No.	Pos.	Player	Date of birth (age)	Club
1	GK	Ei Sandar Zaw	15 February 2000 (age 26)	(Myanmar Football Federation) ISPE
18	GK	Zu Latt Nadi	22 December 2000 (age 25)	(Myanmar Football Federation) ISPE
22	GK	Myo Mya Mya Nyein	22 August 1999 (age 27)	(Myanmar Football Federation) Thitsar Arman
2	DF	May Thet Mon Myint	1 January 2004 (age 22)	(Myanmar Football Federation) Thitsar Arman
3	DF	Yu Yu Naing	29 November 2007 (age 18)	(Myanmar Football Federation) Yangon United
4	DF	Zune Yu Ya Oo	12 February 2001 (age 25)	(Myanmar Football Federation) Ayeyawady
5	DF	Phyu Phyu Win	1 December 2004 (age 21)	(Myanmar Football Federation) Ayeyawady
11	DF	Yu Per Khine	31 January 1996 (age 30)	(Myanmar Football Federation) Shan United
14	DF	Lin Lae Oo	6 September 2002 (age 24)	(Myanmar Football Federation) ISPE
17	DF	Than Than Nwe	5 August 2001 (age 25)	(Myanmar Football Federation) ISPE
21	DF	Zune Thae Oo	24 November 2002 (age 23)	(Myanmar Football Federation) Shan United
23	DF	Khin Myo Thandar Tun	22 February 2004 (age 22)	(Myanmar Football Federation) Shan United
6	MF	Naw Htet Htet Wai	30 July 2000 (age 26)	(Myanmar Football Federation) Ayeyawady
10	MF	Khin Marlar Tun	21 May 1988 (age 38)	(Myanmar Football Federation) ISPE
12	MF	Win Theingi Tun	1 February 1995 (age 31)	(Myanmar Football Federation) Thitsar Arman
15	MF	Zin Mar Htwe	5 May 2003 (age 23)	(Myanmar Football Federation) Thitsar Arman
16	MF	Lin Myint Mo	9 June 2002 (age 24)	(Myanmar Football Federation) ISPE
19	MF	Shwe Yee Tun	14 May 2003 (age 23)	(Myanmar Football Federation) ISPE
20	MF	Daisy Aung	9 June 2006 (age 20)	(Myanmar Football Federation) Yangon United
7	FW	Win Win Tun	12 February 2003 (age 23)	(Myanmar Football Federation) Yadanarbon
8	FW	Myat Noe Khin	24 July 2003 (age 23)	(Myanmar Football Federation) Thitsar Arman
9	FW	Su Su Kyi	30 May 2006 (age 20)	(Myanmar Football Federation) Yangon United
13	FW	May Htet Lu	28 January 2003 (age 23)	(Myanmar Football Federation) Ayeyawady

Group play

Pos	Team	Pld	W	D	L	GF	GA	GD	Pts	Qualification
1	North Korea	3	2	1	0	19	1	+18	7	Advance to knockout stage
2	South Korea	3	2	1	0	12	1	+11	7	Advance to knockout stage
3	Myanmar	3	0	1	2	0	13	−13	1	
4	Bangladesh	3	0	1	2	0	16	−16	1	

Source: Aichi–Nagoya 26

14 September 2026
19:30

South Korea	5–0	Myanmar
Kim Min-ji 29', 33', 59'; Jang Sel-gi 38'; Choe Yu-ri 76'	Report

Nagai Stadium, Osaka
Attendance: 500
Referee: Tian Jin (China)

17 September 2026
19:30

Myanmar	0–8	North Korea
	Report	Ri Myong-gum 10'; Ri Song-a 18' (pen.); Khin Marlar Tun 37' (o.g.); Jon Ryong-jong 40', 42'; Choe Kum-ok 58', 77'; Jong Kum 66'

Nagai Stadium, Osaka
Attendance: 885
Referee: Mu Mingxin (China)

21 September 2026
16:00

Bangladesh	0–0	Myanmar
	Report

Nagai Stadium, Osaka
Attendance: 571
Referee: Roziyabonu Yusupova (Uzbekistan)

== Gymnastics ==
=== Artistic ===
Women

Athlete	Event	Final					
Athlete	Event	Apparatus				Total	Rank
Athlete	Event	V	UB	BB	F	Total	Rank
Pan Ei Phyu	Individual all-around	11.966	9.600	9.666	11.233	42.465	23

== Sepak takraw ==
Men

Athlete	Event	Group stage				Semi-finals	Final	
Athlete	Event	Opposition Score	Opposition Score	Opposition Score	Rank	Opposition Score	Opposition Score	Rank
Aung Myo Kyaw; Thet Paing Soe; Shein Wunna Zaw; Ye Htet; Zaw Min Khant; Zin Min Oo	Quadrant	Vietnam (VIE); L 1–2	Laos (LAO); W 2–1	India (IND); L 2–1	2 Q	Indonesia (INA)		
Aung Aung; Htoo Aung Kyaw; Kyaw Min Thu; Yan Paing Oo; Thant Zin Tun	Regu	Vietnam (VIE); L 0–2	Malaysia (MAS); L 0–2	—N/a	3	Did not advance		

Women

Athlete	Event	Group stage				Semi-finals	Final	
Athlete	Event	Opposition Score	Opposition Score	Opposition Score	Rank	Opposition Score	Opposition Score	Rank
Cherry Lin Thit; Phoo Phoo; Ya Mong Zin	Doubles	Malaysia (MAS); L 1–2	Vietnam (VIE); L 0–2	Laos (LAO); L 0–2	4	Did not advance		

== Teqball ==
Singles

Athlete	Event	Group stage					Quarter-final	Semi-final	Final / BM	
Athlete	Event	Opposition Score	Opposition Score	Opposition Score	Opposition Score	Rank	Opposition Score	Opposition Score	Opposition Score	Rank
Saw Friday	Men	Eidan (KUW); L (8–12, 8–12)	Aidarbekov (KGZ); W (12–8, 12–3)	Ganzorig (MGL); W (12–6, 12–1)	Alelayawi (IRQ); L (10–12, 4–12)	3 Q	Putra (INA); W (12–7, 12–8)	Alelayawi (IRQ); L (11–12, 11–12)	Agustin (PHI); W (12–7, 12–7)	3rd place, bronze medalist(s)
Khin Hnin Wai	Women	Otorbaeva (KGZ); W (12–6, 12–6)	Sumaya (INA); W (12–10, 12–8)	Dandal (LBN); W (12–7, 12–4)	—N/a	1 Q	Bye	Dandal (LBN); W (12–7, 12–8)	Sumaya (INA); W (10–12, 12–8, 12–9)	1st place, gold medalist(s)

Doubles

Team	Event	Group stage				Semi-final	Final / BM	
Team	Event	Opposition Score	Opposition Score	Opposition Score	Rank	Opposition Score	Opposition Score	Rank
Hsu Mon Aung; Phyu Phyu Than	Women	Kuntatong / Wongkhamchan (THA); L (2–12, 8–12)	Yorn / Mey (CAM); W (12–3, 12–7)	Chedid / Dandal (LBN); W (12–9, 12–6)	2 Q	Chedid / Dandal (LBN); W (12–11, 12–1)	Kuntatong / Wongkhamchan (THA); L (6–12, 3–12)	2nd place, silver medalist(s)
