= Kuwait at the 2026 Asian Games =

- IOC code: KUW
- NOC: Kuwait Olympic Committee

in Aichi–Nagoya, Japan September 19 – October 4, 2026
- Medals Ranked 19th: Gold 4 Silver 1 Bronze 4 Total 9

Asian Games appearances (overview)
- 1974; 1978; 1982; 1986; 1990; 1994; 1998; 2002; 2006; 2010; 2014; 2018; 2022; 2026

Other related appearances
- Athletes from Kuwait (2010)

Kuwait is scheduled to compete at the 2026 Asian Games in Aichi Prefecture and Nagoya, Japan from September 19 to October 4, 2026.

== Medal summary ==
Medal	Name	Sport	Event	Date
Bronze	Basel Ahmad; Abdulwahab Al-Qattan	Teqball	Men's doubles	20 September

Medals by sport
Sport	1st place, gold medalist(s)	2nd place, silver medalist(s)	3rd place, bronze medalist(s)	Total
Teqball	0	0	1	1
Total	0	0	1	1

Medals by gender
Gender	1st place, gold medalist(s)	2nd place, silver medalist(s)	3rd place, bronze medalist(s)	Total
Male	0	0	1	1
Total	0	0	1	1

Medals by date
Date	1st place, gold medalist(s)	2nd place, silver medalist(s)	3rd place, bronze medalist(s)	Total
20 September	0	0	1	1
Total	0	0	1	1

== Football ==
Summary

Key:

- A.E.T – After extra time.
- P – Match decided by penalty-shootout.

Team	Event	Group Stage				Quarterfinals	Semifinals	Final / BM	
Team	Event	Opposition Score	Opposition Score	Opposition Score	Rank	Opposition Score	Opposition Score	Opposition Score	Rank
Kuwait men's under-23	Men's tournament	Vietnam; D 1–1	Uzbekistan; L 0–2	Philippines; L 1–2	4	Did not advance			

=== Men's tournament ===
Team squads

Kuwait announced their final squad on 7 September.

Head coach: (Spain) David Dóniga

Preliminary rounds – Group C

Pos	Team	Pld	W	D	L	GF	GA	GD	Pts	Qualification
1	Uzbekistan	3	3	0	0	9	1	+8	9	Advance to knockout stage
2	Vietnam	3	1	1	1	3	3	0	4	Advance to knockout stage
3	Philippines	3	1	0	2	3	8	−5	3	
4	Kuwait	3	0	1	2	2	5	−3	1	

Source: Aichi–Nagoya 26

15 September 2026
19:00

Vietnam	1–1	Kuwait
Nguyễn Ngọc Mỹ 80'	Report	Al-Matar 78'

CS Asset Minato Soccer Stadium, Nagoya
Attendance: 1,058
Referee: Kim Woo-sung (South Korea)

18 September 2026
19:00

Kuwait	0–2	Uzbekistan
	Report	Bakhromov 6', 36'

CS Asset Minato Soccer Stadium, Nagoya
Attendance: 638
Referee: Sami Al-Ismail (Saudi Arabia)

22 September 2026
14:00

Philippines	2–1	Kuwait
Rublico 19'; Aldeguer 90+1' (pen.)	Report	Woods 66' (o.g.)

CS Asset Minato Soccer Stadium, Nagoya
Attendance: 682
Referee: Songkran Bunmeekiart (Thailand)

== Handball ==
Team	Event	Group stage					Quarterfinal	Semifinal	Final / BM	
Team	Event	Opposition Score	Opposition Score	Opposition Score	Opposition Score	Rank	Opposition Score	Opposition Score	Opposition Score	Rank
Kuwait men's	Men's tournament	Iran; W 26–24	South Korea; L 23–26	Kazakhstan; W 43–19	Bahrain; L 25–28	3 Q	Japan; L 32–37	Did not advance		

=== Men's tournament ===
Team rosters

- Abdullah Al-Khamees (5)
- Saleh Ali (6)
- Abdulaziz Al-Shammari (7)
- Abdulaziz Najem (8)
- Humood Al-Adwani (13)
- Hasan Safar (22)
- Saif Al-Adwani (23)
- Fawaz Al-Mashari (40)
- Mohammad Ghadanfar (44)
- Abdulaziz Salmeen (66)
- Husain Mohammad (77)
- Haider Dashti (84)
- Yousef Najem (88)
- Husain Al-Mutawa (91)
- Abdulrahman Al-Shamari (95)
- Mohammad Buyabes (97)

Group Stage – Group B

Pos	Team	Pld	W	D	L	GF	GA	GD	Pts	Qualification
1	Bahrain	4	4	0	0	135	86	+49	8	Quarterfinals
2	South Korea	4	2	1	1	117	101	+16	5	Quarterfinals
3	Kuwait	4	2	0	2	117	97	+20	4	Quarterfinals
4	Iran	4	1	1	2	98	109	−11	3	Quarterfinals
5	Kazakhstan	4	0	0	4	84	158	−74	0	

Source: asiangames2026.org

19 September 2026; 12:30	Iran	24–26	Kuwait	Toyoda Gosei Memorial Gymnasium; Referees: Zhou, Cheng (CHN)
19 September 2026; 12:30	Asari, Oraei 6	(15–13)	Abdula. Al-Shammari 11	Toyoda Gosei Memorial Gymnasium; Referees: Zhou, Cheng (CHN)
19 September 2026; 12:30	1× (yellow card) 5× (suspension)	Report	1× (yellow card) 2× (suspension)	Toyoda Gosei Memorial Gymnasium; Referees: Zhou, Cheng (CHN)

21 September 2026; 17:00	South Korea	26–23	Kuwait	Toyoda Gosei Memorial Gymnasium; Referees: Furukawa, Murata (JPN)
21 September 2026; 17:00	Kim Jin-y. 6	(12–12)	H. Al-Adwani, Al-Mutawa 6	Toyoda Gosei Memorial Gymnasium; Referees: Furukawa, Murata (JPN)
21 September 2026; 17:00	1× (yellow card) 3× (suspension)	Report	1× (yellow card) 2× (suspension)	Toyoda Gosei Memorial Gymnasium; Referees: Furukawa, Murata (JPN)

22 September 2026; 15:00	Kuwait	43–19	Kazakhstan	Toyoda Gosei Memorial Gymnasium; Referees: Abo, Al-Rashed (JOR)
22 September 2026; 15:00	Al-Mutawa 10	(20–12)	Salmov, D. Yakubovich 4	Toyoda Gosei Memorial Gymnasium; Referees: Abo, Al-Rashed (JOR)
22 September 2026; 15:00	2× (suspension)	Report	3× (suspension)	Toyoda Gosei Memorial Gymnasium; Referees: Abo, Al-Rashed (JOR)

25 September 2026; 13:30	Bahrain	28–25	Kuwait	Kasugai City Gymnasium; Referees: Al-Wahibi, Al-Shahi (OMA)
25 September 2026; 13:30	Naser 6	(12–13)	S. Al-Adwani, Al-Mutawa 6	Kasugai City Gymnasium; Referees: Al-Wahibi, Al-Shahi (OMA)
25 September 2026; 13:30	1× (yellow card) 2× (suspension)	Report	1× (yellow card) 1× (suspension)	Kasugai City Gymnasium; Referees: Al-Wahibi, Al-Shahi (OMA)

Knockout Stage – Quarterfinals

26 September 2026; 12:00	Japan	37–32	Kuwait	Kasugai City Gymnasium; Referees: Pak, Cha (KOR)
26 September 2026; 12:00	Nakata, Sugioka 9	(23–12)	S. Al-Adwani 15	Kasugai City Gymnasium; Referees: Pak, Cha (KOR)
26 September 2026; 12:00	3× (suspension)	Report	4× (suspension)	Kasugai City Gymnasium; Referees: Pak, Cha (KOR)

== Karate ==
Men

Athlete	Event	Round of 16	Quarterfinals	Semifinals	Repechage	Final / BM	
Athlete	Event	Opposition Result	Opposition Result	Opposition Result	Opposition Result	Opposition Result	Rank
Mohammad Al-Mosawi	Individual kata	Bye	Phạm (VIE); W 5–0	Nishiyama (JPN); L 1–4	—N/a	Setiabudi (INA); W 3–2	3rd place, bronze medalist(s)
Mohammad Al-Mosawi; Mohammad Hussain; Salman Al-Mosawi	Team kata	—N/a	Vietnam; W 5–0	Malaysia; W 5–0	—N/a	Macau; W 5–0	1st place, gold medalist(s)
Abdullah Shaaban	–60 kg	Kalykov (KGZ); W 0–0	Al-Basher (KSA); W 11–8	Tamang (NEP); W 10–0	—N/a	Abdelhamid (QAT); W 8–0	1st place, gold medalist(s)
Omar Al-Jenaei	–75 kg	Batican (PHI); L 3–3	Did not advance				

Women

Athlete	Event	Round of 16	Quarterfinals	Semifinals	Repechage	Final / BM	
Athlete	Event	Opposition Result	Opposition Result	Opposition Result	Opposition Result	Opposition Result	Rank
Dalal Al-Saied	Individual kata	Torres (PHI); L 2–3	Did not advance				
Slamh Al-Sultan	–50 kg	Chung Y-c (TPE); L 1–3	Did not advance				
Asrar Jasem	–55 kg	Robert (MAS); L 1–9	Did not advance		Rakhimova (UZB); L 1–3	Did not advance	

== Modern pentathlon ==
Athlete	Event	Fencing ranking round (épée one touch)		Semi-finals													Final												
Athlete	Event	Fencing ranking round (épée one touch)		Fencing		Obstacles			Swimming (100 m freestyle)			Laser-run (10 m laser pistol / 3000 m cross-country)			Total points	Final rank	Fencing		Obstacles			Swimming			Laser-run			Total points	Final rank
Athlete	Event	V–D	Rank	Rank	MP points	Time	Rank	MP points	Time	Rank	MP points	Time	Rank	MP points	Total points	Final rank	Rank	MP points	Time	Rank	MP points	Time	Rank	MP points	Time	Rank	MP points	Total points	Final rank
Mohammad Al-Suhaibi	Men	15–20	24	12	212	0:42.74	16	317	1:19.69	17	202	13:49.16	17	471	1202	17	Did not advance												
Habari Al-Thuwaini	Women	10–22	26	12	212	EL			2:09.42	17	0	21:23.71	17	71	229	17	Did not advance												
Retaj Abd Al-Hussain	Women	7–25	32	17	198	EL			1:49.67	16	52	20:29.91	16	71	321	16	Did not advance												

== Teqball ==
Singles

Athlete	Event	Group stage					Quarterfinal	Semifinal	Repechage	Final / BM	
Athlete	Event	Opposition Score	Opposition Score	Opposition Score	Opposition Score	Rank	Opposition Score	Opposition Score	Opposition Score	Opposition Score	Rank
Zaid Eidan	Men	Saw (MYA); W (12–8, 12–8)	Ganzorig (MGL); W (12–0, 12–3)	Alelayawi (IRQ); L (8–12, 7–12)	Aidarbekov (KGZ); W (12–5, 12–3)	2 Q	Wase (JPN); W (12–6, 12–9)	Lee J-s (KOR); W (10–12, 2–3 ret)	—N/a	Putra (INA); L WO	5

Doubles

Team	Event	Group stage					Quarterfinal	Semifinal	Repechage	Final / BM	
Team	Event	Opposition Score	Opposition Score	Opposition Score	Opposition Score	Rank	Opposition Score	Opposition Score	Opposition Score	Opposition Score	Rank
Basel Ahmad; Abdulwahab Al-Qattan	Men	Nominchimeg / Ganzorig (MGL); W (12–3, 12–3)	Nodomi / Arai (JPN); W (12–8, 12–8)	—N/a		1 Q	Uba / Mardan (INA); W (12–9, 12–6)	Arabi / Hafez (LBN); L (9–12, 12–11, 9–12)	—N/a	Uba / Mardan (INA); W (12–5, 7–12, 10–12)	3rd place, bronze medalist(s)
Salman Al-Ebraheem; Hessah Al-Failakawi	Mixed	Bun / Yorn (CAM); L (4–12, 9–12)	Abulencia / Agustin (PHI); L (7–12, 12–11, 8–12)	Dejaroen / Wongkhamchan (THA); L (6–12, 3–12)	Dsouza / Beg (IND); L (1–12, 6–12)	5	Did not advance				
