= Aidana Otorbaeva =

Kyrgyzstani footballer (born 1995)

Aidana Kubatbekovna Otorbaeva (Russian: Айдана Оторбаева; born 31 July 1995) is a Kyrgyzstani footballer. She joined Madrid CFF in 2018 but did not play for the club in the top division.
