= Kyrgyzstan at the 2026 Asian Games =

- IOC code: KGZ
- NOC: National Olympic Committee of the Kyrgyz Republic

in Aichi–Nagoya, Japan September 19 – October 4, 2026
- Competitors: 174 in 27 sports
- Medals Ranked 26th: Gold 1 Silver 3 Bronze 10 Total 14

Asian Games appearances (overview)
- 1994; 1998; 2002; 2006; 2010; 2014; 2018; 2022; 2026

Kyrgyzstan is currently competing at the 2026 Asian Games in Aichi Prefecture and Nagoya, Japan from September 19 to October 4, 2026.

The Kyrgyz team consisted of 174 athletes.

== Medalists ==
The following Kyrgyz competitors won medals at the Games.

Medal	Name	Sport	Event	Date
Silver	Denis Petrashov	Swimming	Men's 200 m breaststroke	24 Sep
Bronze	Dastan Kanybek Uulu	Mixed martial arts	Men's modern 60 kg	21 Sep
Bronze	Yryskeldi Duisheev	Mixed martial arts	Men's modern 71 kg	21 Sep
Bronze	Syimyk Zhanybek Uulu	Mixed martial arts	Men's traditional 77 kg	21 Sep

Medals by sport
Sport	1st place, gold medalist(s)	2nd place, silver medalist(s)	3rd place, bronze medalist(s)	Total
Swimming	0	1	0	1
Mixed martial arts	0	0	3	3
Total	0	1	3	4

Medals by day
Day	Date	1st place, gold medalist(s)	2nd place, silver medalist(s)	3rd place, bronze medalist(s)	Total
1	20 September	0	0	0	0
2	21 September	0	0	3	3
3	22 September	0	0	0	0
4	23 September	0	0	0	0
5	24 September	0	1	0	1
6	25 September				
7	26 September				
8	27 September				
9	28 September				
10	29 September				
11	30 September				
12	1 October				
13	2 October				
14	3 October				
15	4 October				
Total		0	1	3	4

== Competitors ==
The following is a list of the number of competitors representing Kyrgyzstan participating at the Asian Games:

Sport	Men	Women	Total
Swimming	2	1	3
Archery	3	3	6
Athletics	1	2	3
Boxing	6	0	6
Canoeing	4	0	4
Ju-jitsu	10	2	12
Kurash	3	4	7
Mixed martial arts	3	1	4
Esports	8	0	8
Fencing	4	1	5
Football	23	0	23
Golf	1	0	1
Gymnastics	0	8	8
Judo	7	6	13
Karate	3	1	4
Modern pentathlon	1	2	3
Sailing	1	0	1
Shooting	2	4	6
Table tennis	3	1	4
Taewondo	1	2	3
Teqball	1	1	2
Triathlon	2	2	4
Volleyball	11	12	23
Beach volleyball	0	2	2
Weightlifting	1	0	1
Wrestling	11	3	14
Wushu	3	1	4
Total	115	59	174

== Football ==
Summary

Key:

- A.E.T – After extra time.
- P – Match decided by penalty-shootout.

Team	Event	Group Stage				Quarterfinals	Semifinals	Final / BM	
Team	Event	Opposition Score	Opposition Score	Opposition Score	Rank	Opposition Score	Opposition Score	Opposition Score	Rank
Kyrgyzstan men's under-23	Men's tournament	Thailand; L 2–3	Japan; L 0–7	Hong Kong; W 4–0	3	Did not advance			

=== Men's tournament ===
Team squads

Kyrgyzstan announced their final squad on 5 September.

Head coach: Nadyrbek Mamadaliev

Preliminary rounds – Group A

Pos	Team	Pld	W	D	L	GF	GA	GD	Pts	Qualification
1	Japan (H)	3	3	0	0	12	0	+12	9	Advance to knockout stage
2	Thailand	3	2	0	1	8	6	+2	6	Advance to knockout stage
3	Kyrgyzstan	3	1	0	2	6	10	−4	3	
4	Hong Kong	3	0	0	3	1	11	−10	0	

Source: Aichi–Nagoya 26
(H) Hosts

16 September 2026
16:00

Thailand	3–2	Kyrgyzstan
Jehhanafee 55'; Paripan 69', 73'	Report	Iskandarbekov 22'; Balbakov 47'

Toyota Stadium, Toyota
Attendance: 2,563
Referee: Abdulhadi Al-Ruaile (Qatar)

20 September 2026
19:30

Kyrgyzstan	0–7	Japan
	Report	Yokoyama 28'; Nagano 36'; Ozeki 39'; Y. Nakajima 70' (pen.); Ishii 72'; Shimamoto 79', 86'

Toyota Stadium, Toyota
Attendance: 19,205
Referee: Payam Heydari (Iran)

23 September 2026
19:30

Kyrgyzstan	4–0	Hong Kong
Omarov 7'; Madanov 22'; Abduzhaparov 63'; S. Nematov 86'	Report

Wave Stadium Kariya, Kariya
Attendance: 1,187
Referee: Saud Al-Samhan (Kuwait)

== Gymnastics ==
=== Artistic ===
Women

Athlete	Event	Qualification						Final					
Athlete	Event	Apparatus				Total	Rank	Apparatus				Total	Rank
Athlete	Event	V	UB	BB	F	Total	Rank	V	UB	BB	F	Total	Rank
Anaita Krasnoperova	Individual all-around	—N/a						11.666	7.566	11.066	10.733	41.031	24

== Karate ==
Men

Athlete	Event	Round of 16	Quarterfinals	Semifinals	Repechage	Final / BM	
Athlete	Event	Opposition Result	Opposition Result	Opposition Result	Opposition Result	Opposition Result	Rank
Bekzhan Sabyrzhanovich Kalykov	–60 kg	Shaaban (KUW); L 0–0	Did not advance		Al-Basher (KSA); L 2–10	Did not advance	
Erlan Akylbek Uulu	–67 kg	Daifallah (PLE); L 0–0	Did not advance				
Nazim Nurlanov	–75 kg	Tang (SGP); W 4–3	Nazmyradow (TKM); L 2–7	Did not advance	—N/a	Bani Al-Marjeh (SYR); L 8–18	5

Women

Athlete	Event	Quarterfinals	Semifinals	Final / BM	
Athlete	Event	Opposition Result	Opposition Result	Opposition Result	Rank
Begimai Orozalieva	+68 kg	Butsuwan (THA); L 8–8	Did not advance	Lubis (INA); L 1–6	5

== Modern pentathlon ==
Athlete	Event	Fencing ranking round (épée one touch)		Semi-finals													Final												
Athlete	Event	Fencing ranking round (épée one touch)		Fencing		Obstacles			Swimming (100 m freestyle)			Laser-run (10 m laser pistol / 3000 m cross-country)			Total points	Final rank	Fencing		Obstacles			Swimming			Laser-run			Total points	Final rank
Athlete	Event	V–D	Rank	Rank	MP points	Time	Rank	MP points	Time	Rank	MP points	Time	Rank	MP points	Total points	Final rank	Rank	MP points	Time	Rank	MP points	Time	Rank	MP points	Time	Rank	MP points	Total points	Final rank
Atai Erkinbekov	Men	14–21	26	13	210	0:41.50	18	321	1:05.20	16	274	12:58.38	15	522	1327	15	Did not advance												
Mariia Shtukina	Women	9–23	29	14	208	1:01.84	13	260	1:14.07	14	230	15:30.05	14	369	1068	13	Did not advance												
Riana Osmanova	Women	10–22	25	14	208	1:06.71	16	245	1:11.06	13	245	DNF					Did not advance												

== Shooting ==
Men

Athlete	Event	Qualification		Final	
Athlete	Event	Points	Rank	Points	Rank
Askat Tokmokov	10 m air pistol	557-15x	53	Did not advance	
Ruslan Rodionov	10 m air pistol	572-15x	24	Did not advance	

Women

Athlete	Event	Qualification		Final	
Athlete	Event	Points	Rank	Points	Rank
Bakhtigul Makhmadova	10 m air pistol	565-14x	34	Did not advance	
Aijan Ergeshova	10 m air rifle	626.1	25	Did not advance	
Zhibek Temirovna Bektashova	10 m air rifle	622.6	35	Did not advance	
Aruuke Talantbekova	10 m air rifle	627.6	18	Did not advance	
Aruuke Talantbekova	50 m rifle 3 position	584-24x	17	Did not advance	
Aijan Ergeshova; Aruuke Talantbekova; Zhibek Temirovna Bektashova	10 m air rifle team	—N/a		1876.3	10

Mixed team

Athlete	Event	Qualification		Final	
Athlete	Event	Points	Rank	Points	Rank
Bakhtigul Makhmadova; Ruslan Rodionov	10 m air pistol	561-10x	16	Did not advance	

== Table tennis ==
Men

Athlete	Event	Round of 64	Round of 32	Round of 16	Quarterfinal	Semifinal	Final	
Athlete	Event	Opposition Result	Opposition Result	Opposition Result	Opposition Result	Opposition Result	Opposition Result	Rank
Atai Kasymov	Singles	Al-Dhubhani (YEM); L 3–4	Did not advance					
Nuradil Tologonov	Singles	U T-r (PRK); L 0–4	Did not advance					
Abai Kasymov; Atai Kasymov	Doubles	Saleh / Rashed (BRN); L 0–3	Did not advance					

Women

Athlete	Event	Round of 64	Round of 32	Round of 16	Quarterfinal	Semifinal	Final	
Athlete	Event	Opposition Result	Opposition Result	Opposition Result	Opposition Result	Opposition Result	Opposition Result	Rank
Nurkyz Aiazbekova	Singles	Swarna (SRI); L 1–4	Did not advance					

Mixed

Athlete	Event	Round of 32	Round of 16	Quarterfinal	Semifinal	Final	
Athlete	Event	Opposition Result	Opposition Result	Opposition Result	Opposition Result	Opposition Result	Rank
Atai Kasymov; Nurkyz Aiazbekova	Doubles	Lin Y-j / Cheng I-c (TPE); L 0–3	Did not advance				

Team

Athlete	Event	Group stage			Round of 16	Quarterfinal	Semifinal	Final	
Athlete	Event	Opposition Score	Opposition Score	Rank	Opposition Score	Opposition Score	Opposition Score	Opposition Score	Rank
Abai Kasymov; Atai Kasymov; Nuradil Tologonov	Men's	Hong Kong; L 0–3	Thailand; L 0–3	3	Did not advance				

== Teqball ==
Singles

Athlete	Event	Group stage					Quarterfinal	Semifinal	Repechage	Final / BM	
Athlete	Event	Opposition Score	Opposition Score	Opposition Score	Opposition Score	Rank	Opposition Score	Opposition Score	Opposition Score	Opposition Score	Rank
Kudaiberdi Abdilazizovich Aidarbekov	Men	Ganzorig (MGL); W (12–10, 12–7)	Saw (MYA); L (8–12, 3–12)	Alelayawi (IRQ); L (2–12, 2–12)	Eidan (KUW); L (5–12, 3–12)	4 Q	Lee J-s (KOR); L (2–12, 1–12)	Did not advance	Agustin (IRQ); L (2–12, 8–12)	Did not advance	
Aidana Otorbaeva	Women	Khin Hnin (MYA); L (6–12, 6–12)	Dandal (LBN); L (7–12, 3–12)	Sumaya (INA); L (12–6, 6–12, 6–12)	—N/a	4	Did not advance				

Doubles

Team	Event	Group stage						Quarterfinal	Semifinal	Repechage	Final / BM	
Team	Event	Opposition Score	Opposition Score	Opposition Score	Opposition Score	Opposition Score	Rank	Opposition Score	Opposition Score	Opposition Score	Opposition Score	Rank
Kudaiberdi Abdilazizovich Aidarbekov; Aidana Otorbaeva	Mixed	Kim E-j / Jang E-s (KOR); L (5–12, 9–12)	Sakamoto / Wase (JPN); L (5–12, 8–12)	Radhi / Abed (THA); L (4–12, 8–12)	Inthalapeth / Phonexay (LAO); L (2–12, 6–12)	Nguyễn / Trịnh (VIE); L (1–12, 5–12)	6	Did not advance				

== Triathlon ==
Individual

Athlete	Event	Time						Rank
Athlete	Event	Swim (0.75 km)	Trans 1	Bike (20 km)	Trans 2	Run (5 km)	Total	Rank
Adamkhan Arturovich Salamatov	Men	10:45	0:43	32:04	0:24	20:18	1:04:14	29
Temirlan Abdrakhimov	Men	9:51	0:37	31:50	0:18	20:26	1:03:02	27
Angelina Blindul	Women	12:26	0:45	34:10	0:27	22:31	1:10:19	
Anna Kramarenko	Women	12:29	0:49	Lapped				

Relay

Athlete	Event	Time						Rank
Athlete	Event	Swim (300 m)	Trans 1	Bike (6.6 km)	Trans 2	Run (1 km)	Total	Rank
Angelina Blindul	Mixed	4:54	0:53	11:46	0:29	8:09	26:11	—N/a
Temirlan Abdrakhimov	Mixed	4:23	0:46	11:00	0:22	7:45	24:16	—N/a
Anna Kramarenko	Mixed	5:26	1:02	12:57	0:28	8:16	28:09	—N/a
Adamkhan Arturovich Salamatov	Mixed	4:43	0:49	11:16	0:25	7:16	24:29	—N/a
Total	Mixed	—N/a					1:43:05	13

== Volleyball ==
Summary

Team	Event	Group stage				Quarterfinal / 9th-14th classification	Semifinal / 9th-12th classification	Final / BM	
Team	Event	Opposition Score	Opposition Score	Opposition Score	Rank	Opposition Score	Opposition Score	Opposition Score	Rank
Kyrgyzstan men's	Men's tournament	Iran; L 0–3	Indonesia; L 0–3	Thailand; L 0–3	4	Chinese Taipei; L 0–3	13th-16th classification Hong Kong; W 3–1	13th place match Philippines; L 0–3	14
Kyrgyzstan women's	Women's tournament	Chinese Taipei; L 0–3	Thailand; L 0–3	Mongolia; L 0–3	4 C	Nepal; L 0–3	—N/a	13th place match Qatar; W 3–0	13

=== Men's tournament ===
Team roster

- Manazbek Nuraly Uulu
- Onolbek Kanybek Uulu
- Iliaz Abdimomun Uulu
- Zhamalidin Musaev
- Roman Shilov
- Ernis Erkinovich Toktosunov
- Zhantemir Zheenbek Uulu
- Amantur Kubatbekovich Bazhiev
- Baiastan Zhyrgalbek Uulu
- Baiel Askar Uulu
- Nurmukhammed Tokhtoev

Group play

Pos	Team	Pld	W	L	Pts	SW	SL	SR	SPW	SPL	SPR	Qualification
1	India	3	3	0	8	9	2	4.500	275	246	1.118	Quarterfinals
2	Qatar	3	2	1	7	8	4	2.000	297	280	1.061	Quarterfinals
3	Vietnam	3	1	2	3	3	7	0.429	230	238	0.966	Classification 9th–16th
4	Hong Kong	3	0	3	0	2	9	0.222	234	272	0.860	Classification 9th–16th

Source: asiangames2026.org
Rules for classification: Tiebreakers

=== Women's tournament ===
Team roster

- Gulmira Almasbekovna Tulenova (1)
- Perizat Azizovna Aitbekova (19)
- Madina Mirlan Kyzy (5)
- Asema Seiitbekova (10)
- Nurzhamal Bolotbekovna Bolotbekova (6)
- Zhanetta Bakytbekovna Suerkulova (18)
- Raiana Baiamanova (7)
- Aizhanat Beishenova (3)
- Mariia Ivanovna Tkacheva (4)
- Azemi Abdinabievna Asamidinova (9)
- Saikal Azamatovna Amirakulova (11)
- Alfiia Bolotovna Yskakova (14)

Group play

Pos	Team	Pld	W	L	Pts	SW	SL	SR	SPW	SPL	SPR	Qualification
1	Thailand	3	3	0	9	9	0	MAX	225	139	1.619	Quarterfinals
2	Chinese Taipei	3	2	1	6	6	3	2.000	214	157	1.363	Quarterfinals
3	Mongolia	3	1	2	3	3	6	0.500	167	198	0.843	Classification 9th–12th
4	Kyrgyzstan	3	0	3	0	0	9	0.000	113	225	0.502	Classification 9th–14th

Source: asiangames2026.org
Rules for classification: Tiebreakers
