= Cambodia at the 2026 Asian Games =

- IOC code: CAM
- NOC: National Olympic Committee of Cambodia

in Aichi–Nagoya, Japan September 19 – October 4, 2026
- Competitors: 59 in 14 sports
- Medals Ranked 35th: Gold 0 Silver 0 Bronze 4 Total 4

Asian Games appearances (overview)
- 1954; 1958; 1962; 1966; 1970; 1974; 1978–1990; 1994; 1998; 2002; 2006; 2010; 2014; 2018; 2022; 2026

Cambodia competed at the 2026 Asian Games in [[[Nagoya]], Aichi Prefecture, Japan from September 19 to October 4, 2026.

== Medalists ==
The following Cambodia competitors won medals at the Games.

Medal	Name	Sport	Event	Date
Bronze	Dy Koemyean	Teqball	Women's singles	20 Sep
Bronze	Mey Sreymeas; Yorn Sophornraksmey	Teqball	Women's doubles	20 Sep
Bronze	Cheng Dalin	Mixed martial arts	Women's traditional 60 kg	21 Sep
Bronze	Vann Chakriya	Karate	Women's kumite 61 kg	21 Sep

Medals by sport
Sport	1st place, gold medalist(s)	2nd place, silver medalist(s)	3rd place, bronze medalist(s)	Total
Mixed martial arts	0	0	1	1
Karate	0	0	1	1
Teqball	0	0	2	2
Total	0	0	4	4

Medals by day
Day	Date	1st place, gold medalist(s)	2nd place, silver medalist(s)	3rd place, bronze medalist(s)	Total
1	20 September	0	0	2	2
2	21 September	0	0	2	2
3	22 September	0	0	0	0
4	23 September	0	0	0	0
5	24 September	0	0	0	0
6	25 September				
7	26 September				
8	27 September				
9	28 September				
10	29 September				
11	30 September				
12	1 October				
13	2 October				
14	3 October				
15	4 October				
Total		0	0	4	4

== Competitors ==
The following is a list of the number of competitors representing Cambodia that will participate at the Asian Games:

Sport	Men	Women	Total
Athletics	2	1	3
Boxing	3	0	3
Esports	6	0	6
Ju-jitsu	5	0	5
Judo	3	0	3
Karate	5	5	10
Mixed martial arts	1	1	2
Sailing	1	0	1
Soft tennis	5	5	10
Swimming	3	1	4
Taekwondo	1	1	2
Teqball	1	3	4
Triathlon	0	1	1
Wrestling	3	2	5
Total	39	20	59

== Athletics ==
Key

- Note–Ranks given for track events are within the athlete's heat only
- Q = Qualified for the next round
- q = Qualified for the next round as a fastest loser or, in field events, by position without achieving the qualifying target
- NR = National record
- N/A = Round not applicable for the event
- Bye = Athlete not required to compete in round

Track events

Athlete	Event	Final	
Athlete	Event	Result	Rank
Terence Lai	Men's 5000 m	15:19.19	17
Terence Lai	Men's 10,000 m	32:12.14	9

Road events

Athlete	Event	Final	
Athlete	Event	Result	Rank
Sreyroth Kan	Women's marathon	3:02:49	17

Field events

Athlete	Event	Final	
Athlete	Event	Distance	Position
Samedy Sim	Men's shot put	15.53	13

== Boxing ==
Athlete	Event	Round of 32	Round of 16	Quarterfinals	Semifinals	Final	
Athlete	Event	Opposition Result	Opposition Result	Opposition Result	Opposition Result	Opposition Result	Rank
Vy Sophors	Men's 70 kg	Petecio (PHI); L 0–5	Did not advance				
Anvar Nasredinov	Men's 80 kg	—N/a	Yazmin (SRI); L 1–4	Did not advance			

== Esports ==
MLBB

Gamer	Event	Group stage	Rank	Quarter-final	Semi-final	Final	Rank
Gamer	Event	Opposition Score	Rank	Opposition Score	Opposition Score	Opposition Score	Rank
Hok Vongpanha; Hy Meng Kong; Keo Phavin; Nhem Chandavan; Sovan Chanmakara; Ty Oudom	Mobile Legends: Bang Bang	Mongolia (MGL); L 0–2	2 Q	Myanmar (MYA); L 1–2	Did not advance		

== Ju-jitsu ==
Athlete	Event	Round of 64	Round of 32	Round of 16	Quarterfinals	Semifinals	Repechage	Final / BM	
Athlete	Event	Opposition Result	Opposition Result	Opposition Result	Opposition Result	Opposition Result	Opposition Result	Opposition Result	Rank
Kaimoni Richhavath Operana	Men's –62 kg	—N/a	–	–	–	–	–	–	
Sor Sophanuth	Men's –62 kg	—N/a	–	–	–	–	–	–	
William Chan Om-Feld	Men's –69 kg	–	–	–	–	–	–	–	
Sao Sopheara	Men's –69 kg	–	–	–	–	–	–	–	
Sopanha Moeun Lim	Men's –85 kg	—N/a	–	–	–	–	–	–	

== Judo ==
Athlete	Event	Round of 32	Round of 16	Quarterfinals	Semifinals	Repechage	Final / BM	
Athlete	Event	Opposition Result	Opposition Result	Opposition Result	Opposition Result	Opposition Result	Opposition Result	Rank
Volodymyr Guchkov	Men's –60 kg	–	–	–	–	–	–	
Somnang Chantha	Men's –66 kg	–	–	–	–	–	–	
Vitshika Bayt	Men's –90 kg	–	–	–	–	–	–	

== Karate ==
Men

Athlete	Event	Round of 16	Quarterfinals	Semifinals	Repechage	Final / BM	
Athlete	Event	Opposition Result	Opposition Result	Opposition Result	Opposition Result	Opposition Result	Rank
Theng Kimchhea	Individual kata	Phạm (VIE); L 2–3	Did not advance				
Chheng Chandararattanak; Theng Kimchhea; Ho Heng	Team kata	—N/a	Chinese Taipei; L 1–4	Did not advance			
Chrun Virakbouth	67 kg	Altynbek (KAZ); L 2–3	Did not advance				
Sreang Virak	+84 kg	—N/a	Hutapea (INA); L 0–5	Did not advance			

Women

Athlete	Event	Round of 16	Quarterfinals	Semifinals	Repechage	Final / BM	
Athlete	Event	Opposition Result	Opposition Result	Opposition Result	Opposition Result	Opposition Result	Rank
That Chhenghorng	Individual kata	Leong (SGP); L 1–4	Did not advance				
Puthea Sreynuch; That Chhenghorng; Oun Sreyda	Team kata	—N/a	Philippines; L 0–5	Did not advance			
Chonn Srey Phea	50 kg	Adriano (PHI); L 3–4	Did not advance				
Vann Chakriya	61 kg	Bye	Naser (JOR); W 6–0	Kanay (KAZ); L 0–3	—N/a	Antora (BAN); W 5–0	3rd place, bronze medalist(s)

== Mixed martial arts ==
Athlete	Event	Preliminary	Quarterfinal	Semifinal	Final	
Athlete	Event	Opposition Result	Opposition Result	Opposition Result	Opposition Result	Rank
Pheng Sopanha	Men's modern −60 kg	—N/a	Khan (PAK); L 0–3	Did not advance		
Cheng Dalin	Women's traditional −60 kg	—N/a	Alammari (KSA); W 2–0	Sobirova (UZB); L 0–2	Did not advance	3rd place, bronze medalist(s)

== Sailing ==
Medal race events

Athlete	Event	Race											Net points	Final rank
Athlete	Event	1	2	3	4	5	6	7	8	9	10	M*	Net points	Final rank
Nhov Chan	Men's ILCA 7													

M = Medal race; EL = Eliminated – did not advance into the medal race

== Soft tennis ==
Men

Athlete	Event	Group stage				Second Stage	Quarter-finals	Semi-finals	Final / BM	
Athlete	Event	Opposition Score	Opposition Score	Opposition Score	Rank	Opposition Score	Opposition Score	Opposition Score	Opposition Score	Rank
Doeum Samsocheaphearun	Singles	Uematsu (JPN); L 0–4	Ali (PAK); W 4–0	Hutauruk (INA); L 2–4	3	Did not advance				
Yi Keavirak	Singles	Jin-woong (KOR); L 0–4	Kurosaka (JPN); L 0–4	Bataa (MGL); W 4–2	3	Did not advance				
Chao Viva; Doeum Samsocheaphearun; Kan Sophorn; Soy Sothun; Yi Keavirak	Team	Japan; L 0–3	Pakistan; W 3–0	Philippines; L 0–3	3	—N/a	Did not advance			

Women

Athlete	Event	Group stage				Second Stage	Quarter-finals	Semi-finals	Final / BM	
Athlete	Event	Opposition Score	Opposition Score	Opposition Score	Rank	Opposition Score	Opposition Score	Opposition Score	Opposition Score	Rank
Chhan Chheavhouy	Singles	Min-yu (TPE); L 0–4	Arasy (INA); L 1–4	—N/a	3	Did not advance				
Meth Mariyan	Singles	Su-jin (KOR); L 0–4	Shih-yuan (TPE); L 0–4	—N/a	3	Did not advance				
Chhan Chheavhouy; Chhorn Chankanha; Khun Chanroseka; Meth Mariyan; Yean Sokhoeun	Team	Japan; L 0–3	South Korea; L 0–3	Pakistan; W 3–0	3	—N/a		Did not advance		

Mixed

Athlete	Event	Group stage				Second Stage	Quarter-finals	Semi-finals	Final / BM	
Athlete	Event	Opposition Score	Opposition Score	Opposition Score	Rank	Opposition Score	Opposition Score	Opposition Score	Opposition Score	Rank
Chao Viva; Khun Chanroseka	Doubles	Tiwari / Meena (IND); L 0–5	Yeon-hwa / Jae-kyu (KOR); L 0–5	Nyamdorj / Ganbaatar (MGL); W 5–3	3	Did not advance				
Kan Sophorn; Yean Sokhoeun	Doubles	Maeda / Maruyama (JPN); L 0–5	Sanger / Arasy (INA); L 0–5	Hacnolath / Simmalavong (LAO); W 5–4	3	Did not advance				

== Swimming ==
Men

Athlete	Event	Heat		Final	
Athlete	Event	Time	Rank	Time	Rank
Antoine De Lapparent	50 m freestyle	24.68	39	Did not advance	
Antoine De Lapparent	50 m backstroke	28.21	24	Did not advance	
Antoine De Lapparent	100 m backstroke	1:00.64	24	Did not advance	
Antoine De Lapparent	50 m butterfly	25.82	30	Did not advance	
Sok Esarak	50 m freestyle	26.49	43	Did not advance	
Sok Esarak	50 m breaststroke	29.81	=31	Did not advance	
Sok Esarak	100 m breaststroke	1:08.58	31	Did not advance	
Pieter Sokkha Van Oosten	50 m butterfly	26.09	32	Did not advance	
Pieter Sokkha Van Oosten	200 m breaststroke	2:24.28	20	Did not advance	
Pieter Sokkha Van Oosten	200 m individual medley	2:14.71	25	Did not advance	
Pieter Sokkha Van Oosten	400 m individual medley	4:52.81	19	Did not advance	

Women

Athlete	Event	Heat		Final	
Athlete	Event	Time	Rank	Time	Rank
Haley Rose Sakbun	50 m freestyle	27.89	22	Did not advance	
Haley Rose Sakbun	100 m freestyle	1:01.31	26	Did not advance	
Haley Rose Sakbun	50 m butterfly	30.31	23	Did not advance	

== Taekwondo ==
Athlete	Event	Round of 16	Quarterfinals	Semifinals	Final	
Athlete	Event	Opposition Result	Opposition Result	Opposition Result	Opposition Result	Rank
Va Mithona	Men's –80 kg	–	–	–	–	
Julie Mam	Women's –57 kg	–	–	–	–	

== Teqball ==
Singles

Athlete	Event	Group stage			Quarterfinal	Semifinal	Final / BM	
Athlete	Event	Opposition Score	Opposition Score	Rank	Opposition Score	Opposition Score	Opposition Score	Rank
Dy Koemyean	Women	Sakamoto (JPN); L (5–12, 6–12)	Dsouza (IND); L (9–12, 7–12)	3 Q	Sumaya (INA); L (8–12, 7–12)	Did not advance	Dandal (LBN); W (12–10, 10-12, 7-12)	3rd place, bronze medalist(s)

Doubles

Team	Event	Group stage					Quarterfinal	Semifinal	Repechage	Final / BM	
Team	Event	Opposition Score	Opposition Score	Opposition Score	Opposition Score	Rank	Opposition Score	Opposition Score	Opposition Score	Opposition Score	Rank
Yorn Sophornraksmey; Mey Sreymeas	Women	Chedid / Dandal (LBN); L (7–12, 8–12)	Hsu Mon / Phyu Phyu (MYA); L (3–12, 7–12)	Kuntatong / Wongkhamchan (THA); L (2–12, 2–12)	—N/a	4 Q	—N/a	Kuntatong / Wongkhamchan (THA); L (5–12, 4–12)	—N/a	Did not advance	3rd place, bronze medalist(s)
Bun Thuonvireak; Yorn Sophornraksmey	Mixed	Alebraheem / Alfailakawi (KUW); W (12–4, 12–9)	Dejaroen / Wongkhamchan (THA); L (5–12, 5–12)	Dsouza / Beg (IND); W (12–8, 7–12, 12–10)	Abulencia / Agustin (PHI); W (12–6, 12–2)	2 Q	Sakamoto / Wase (JPN); L (9–12, 11–12)	Did not advance	Inthalapheth / Phonexay (LAO); W (12–5, 12–3)	Radhi / Abed (IRQ); L (12–11;, 11–12, 9–12)	5

== Triathlon ==
Athlete	Event	Time						Rank
Athlete	Event	Swim (0.75 km)	Trans 1	Bike (20 km)	Trans 2	Run (5 km)	Total	Rank
Margot Garabedian	Women's individual	9:45	0:38	30:24	0:19	18:37	59:43	7

== Wrestling ==
Cambodia entered five wrestlers.

Key:

- VT (ranking points: 5–0 or 0–5) – Victory by fall.
- VB (ranking points: 5–0 or 0–5) – Victory by injury (VF for forfeit, VA for withdrawal or disqualification)
- PP (ranking points: 3–1 or 1–3) – Decision by points – the loser with technical points.
- PO (ranking points: 3–0 or 0–3) – Decision by points – the loser without technical points.
- ST (ranking points: 4–0 or 0–4) – Great superiority – the loser without technical points and a margin of victory of at least 8 (Greco-Roman) or 10 (freestyle) points.
- SP (ranking points: 4–1 or 1–4) – Technical superiority – the loser with technical points and a margin of victory of at least 8 (Greco-Roman) or 10 (freestyle) points.

Freestyle

Athlete	Event	Round of 32	Round of 16	Quarterfinal	Semifinal	Repechage	Final / BM	
Athlete	Event	Opposition Result	Opposition Result	Opposition Result	Opposition Result	Opposition Result	Opposition Result	Rank
Sophors Soeun	Men's −57 kg	–	–	–	–	–	–	
Heng Vuthy	Men's −86 kg	–	–	–	–	–	–	
Heng Rottha	Men's −97 kg	–	–	–	–	–	–	
Dit Samnang	Women's −50 kg	—N/a	–	–	–	–	–	
Chea Kanha	Women's −62 kg	—N/a	–	–	–	–	–	
