= Akinori Wase =

Personal information
- Native name: 早稲 昭範
- Nickname: WASSE
- Nationality: Japanese
- Born: 8 September 1985 (age 41) Osaka, Japan
- Education: Kyoto Sangyo University

Sport
- Sport: Teqball
Medal record
Men's and mixed teqball
Representing Japan
Asian Games
Silver medal – second place	2026 Aichi-Nagoya	Mixed doubles
Beach Teqball World Tour
Silver medal – second place	2025 Wanning	Men's singles
Bronze medal – third place	2025 Wanning	Men's doubles

Akinori Wase (Japanese: 早稲 昭範; born 8 September 1985), also known as WASSE, is a Japanese teqball player and sports administrator. A former professional freestyle football performer, he began playing teqball in 2017 and has represented Japan at international competitions. He is the president of the Japan Teqball Association and won a silver medal in mixed doubles at the 2026 Asian Games with Yuina Sakamoto.

== Career ==
Wase was born in Osaka Prefecture and graduated from Kyoto Sangyo University in 2008 with a degree in economics. Before taking up teqball, he was a professional freestyle football performer and became known for performing football juggling tricks. He also held a Guinness World Record for juggling while lying down.

Wase began playing teqball in 2017 after being recommended to the Japanese Teqball Association because of his freestyle football background. He initially expected the skills to transfer directly from freestyle football, but found that teqball required different techniques and ball control.

Wase competed for Japan at the first World Teqball Championships and continued to represent the country at international competitions. He became one of the leading Japanese players in the sport and, from 2020, served as the representative director of the Japan Teqball Association, working on the development and promotion of teqball in Japan.

In September 2025, Wase and Yuina Sakamoto won the bronze medal in mixed doubles at the Teqball World Series event in Beijing. It was the first time that a Japanese pair had reached the podium at an international teqball world-series event. Wase also partnered with Seiya Arai in the men's doubles, where they reached the round of 16.

In October 2025, Wase and Arai won the men's doubles title at the Beach International Teqball Cup in Wanning, Hainan, China. The victory was Japan's first world title in beach teqball. Wase also reached the quarterfinals of the men's singles competition.

At the Beach Teqball World Tour event in Wanning in November 2025, Wase won the silver medal in men's singles and the bronze medal in men's doubles with Arai.

At the 2025 Teqball World Championships, Wase and Sakamoto reached the quarterfinals of the mixed doubles event, while Wase and Arai reached the round of 16 in men's doubles.

Wase was selected to represent Japan at the 2026 Asian Games in Aichi-Nagoya in men's singles and mixed doubles. He partnered Sakamoto in the mixed doubles event. In the mixed doubles competition, Wase and Sakamoto defeated the Iraqi pair of Abdulrahman Ahmed Radhi and Samar Shakir Aben in the semifinals to reach the gold-medal match. Their victory guaranteed Japan a medal in teqball on its Asian Games debut. In the mixed doubles final on 20 September 2026, Wase and Sakamoto lost to Thailand's Phakpong Dejaroen and Suphawadi Wongkhamchan and won the silver medal. The result gave Japan its first Asian Games medal in teqball, which made its debut at the Games in Aichi-Nagoya. Wase also competed in the men's singles event at the 2026 Asian Games. He progressed from his group to the knockout stage, but did not reach the medal positions.
