= Yuina Sakamoto =

Japanese teqball player (born 1995)

Personal information
- Nationality: Japanese
- Born: 23 October 1995 (age 31)

Sport
- Sport: Teqball
- Club: TEQBALL CLUB ORTUS
Medal record
Women's and mixed teqball
Representing Japan
Asian Games
Silver medal – second place	2026 Aichi-Nagoya	Mixed doubles
Bronze medal – third place	2026 Aichi-Nagoya	Women's singles
Teqball World Championships
Bronze medal – third place	2025 Odorheiu Secuiesc	Women's singles
Teqball World Series
Bronze medal – third place	2025 Beijing	Mixed doubles

Yuina Sakamoto (Japanese: 坂本 唯那; born 23 October 1995) is a Japanese teqball player. She represents Japan in women's singles and mixed doubles and is a member of TEQBALL CLUB ORTUS. She won the bronze medal in women's singles at the 2025 Teqball World Championships, becoming the first Japanese player to win a medal at the World Championships.

== Career ==
Sakamoto represented Japan in international teqball competitions before establishing herself among the country's leading women's players. At the 2024 Teqball World Championships in Ho Chi Minh City, she competed in women's singles and mixed doubles, reaching the round of 32 in singles and the round of 16 in mixed doubles.

In 2025, Sakamoto competed at several international events. At the Teqball World Series event in Jinan, China, she reached the round of 16 in women's singles and mixed doubles. At the Beijing World Series in September, she partnered Akinori Wase in mixed doubles and won the bronze medal. It was Japan's first podium finish at a Teqball World Series event.

At the 2025 Teqball World Championships in Odorheiu Secuiesc, Romania, Sakamoto reached the semifinals of the women's singles event. She defeated Silvia Ferrer Garcia of Spain in the round of 16 and Daytona Hansen of Germany in the quarterfinals before losing to Kinga Barabasi of Romania in the semifinal. She subsequently won the bronze medal, giving Japan its first World Teqball Championships medal.

Sakamoto continued her international form in 2026. At the Teqball Tour event in Dezhou, China, she reached the podium in women's singles and also reached the quarterfinal stage in mixed doubles. Her results placed her among the leading players in the women's singles world rankings.

Sakamoto was selected to represent Japan at the 2026 Asian Games in Aichi-Nagoya. She competed in women's singles and mixed doubles, partnering Wase in the latter event. At the 2026 Asian Games, Sakamoto won the bronze medal in the women's singles event. She defeated India's Quimcy Dsouza in the bronze-medal match to secure Japan's second medal in teqball at the Games. In mixed doubles, Sakamoto and Wase defeated Iraq in the semifinals to reach the gold-medal match. They lost to Thailand's Phakpong Dejaroen and Suphawadi Wongkhamchan in the final and won the silver medal. The result gave Japan its first Asian Games medal in mixed doubles teqball and contributed to Japan's two-medal haul in teqball at the Games.
