= Sepak takraw at the 2026 Asian Games – Men's quadrant =

Men's quadrant at the 2026 Asian Games
- Venue: Paloma Mizuho Arena
- Date: 30 September–3 October 2026
- Competitors: 48 from 8 nations

Medalists
gold medal	Japan
silver medal	Indonesia
bronze medal	India
bronze medal	Myanmar

The men's quadrant sepak takraw competition at the 2026 Asian Games is held at Paloma Mizuho Arena, Nagoya, Aichi Prefecture from 30 September to 3 October 2026.

Japan won the gold medal, Indonesia took silver, and India and Myanmar the bronze medals.

== Squads ==
Indonesia	India	Japan	South Korea
Yudha Aswinatama; Jelki Ladada; Muhammad Hardiansyah Muliang; Saiful Rijal; Muhammad Ubaidur Rohman; Andi Try Sandi Saputra	Arun; Lokhon Singh Elangbam; Bobby Kumar; Ram Kumar Sharma; Malemnganba Singh Sorokhaibam; Akash Yumnam	Ryota Haruhara; Yota Ichikawa; Toshitaka Naito; Wataru Narawa; Yuki Sato; Seiya Takano	Jeong Ha-sung; Jeong Won-deok; Kim Hyeong-jong; Lee Woo-jin; Lim Tae-gyun; Seonwoo Young-su
Laos	Myanmar	Singapore	Vietnam
Phitthasanh Bounpaseuth; Soukkaserm Chanthahieng; Daophachanh Moungsin; Noum Souvannady; Anousone Vilavongsa; Daovy Xanavongxay	Aung Myo Kyaw; Shein Wunna Zaw; Thet Paing Soe; Ye Htet; Zaw Min Khant; Zin Min Oo	Abdul Hammirruddin Bin Noor; Ahmadi Youri Adli Fathullah Bin; Akmal Musyarraf Bin Rostam; Hairul Fizly Bin Abdullah; Mohammad Fairuz Bin Azahari; Mohammed Belal Muhammad Tasman Bin	Cần Văn Hoàng; Huỳnh Ngọc Sang; Lê Minh Đức; Nguyễn Hoàng Lân; Nguyễn Văn Lý; Vương Minh Châu

== Results ==
All times are Japan Standard Time (UTC+09:00)

=== Preliminary ===
==== Group A ====
Pos	Team	Pld	W	L	SF	SA	SD	Pts	Qualification
1	India	3	3	0	6	1	+5	6	Semifinals
2	Myanmar	3	1	2	4	5	−1	2	Semifinals
3	Laos	3	1	2	3	4	−1	2	
4	Vietnam	3	1	2	2	5	−3	2	

Source: Aichi-Nagoya 2026

Date	Time		Score		Set 1	Set 2	Set 3
30 Sep	09:00	Myanmar	1–2	Vietnam	15–11	13–15	14–17
30 Sep	10:00	India	2–0	Laos	15–9	15–8	
30 Sep	15:00	Myanmar	2–1	Laos	12–15	15–12	15–12
1 Oct	09:00	India	2–0	Vietnam	15–12	15–9	
1 Oct	14:00	Myanmar	1–2	India	15–10	13–15	7–15
2 Oct	09:00	Laos	2–0	Vietnam	15–11	15–13	

==== Group B ====
Pos	Team	Pld	W	L	SF	SA	SD	Pts	Qualification
1	Indonesia	3	3	0	6	1	+5	6	Semifinals
2	Japan	3	2	1	5	2	+3	4	Semifinals
3	South Korea	3	1	2	2	4	−2	2	
4	Singapore	3	0	3	0	6	−6	0	

Source: Aichi-Nagoya 2026

Date	Time		Score		Set 1	Set 2	Set 3
30 Sep	09:00	Indonesia	2–0	South Korea	15–8	15–7	
30 Sep	14:00	Singapore	0–2	South Korea	9–15	11–15	
30 Sep	16:00	Indonesia	2–1	Japan	15–12	10–15	15–10
1 Oct	10:00	Indonesia	2–0	Singapore	15–13	15–5	
1 Oct	15:00	Singapore	0–2	Japan	5–15	8–15	
2 Oct	10:00	South Korea	0–2	Japan	8–15	12–15	

=== Knockout round ===
Semifinals
2 October
India	0
Japan	2
2 October
Myanmar	0
Indonesia	2

Gold medal match
3 October
Japan	2
Indonesia	1

==== Semifinals ====
Date	Time		Score		Set 1	Set 2	Set 3
2 Oct	15:30	India	0–2	Japan	12–15	13–15	
2 Oct	15:30	Myanmar	0–2	Indonesia	13–15	9–15	

==== Gold medal match ====
Date	Time		Score		Set 1	Set 2	Set 3
3 Oct	10:30	Japan	2–1	Indonesia	17–15	9–15	15–13
