= Sepak takraw at the 2026 Asian Games =

- Venue: Paloma Mizuho Arena
- Dates: 20 September – 3 October 2026
- Competitors: 212 from 11 nations

The Sepak takraw tournament at the 2026 Asian Games is being held between 20 September and 3 October 2026 at Paloma Mizuho Arena.

== Schedule ==
The schedule is as follows:

P	Preliminary round	F	Final

Event↓/Date →	20th Sun	21st Mon	22nd Tue	23rd Wed	24th Thu	25th Fri	26th Sat	27th Sun	28th Mon	29th Tue	30th Wed	1st Thu	2nd Fri	3rd Sat
Men's regu								P	P	F				
Men's quadrant											P	P	P	F
Men's team regu	P	P	P	P	P	F								
Women's doubles								P	P	F				
Women's quadrant											P	P	P	F
Women's team regu	P	P	P	P	P	F								

== Medal table ==
* Host nation (Japan)

Rank	Nation	Gold	Silver	Bronze	Total
1	Thailand	2	2	0	4
2	Vietnam	2	0	1	3
3	Malaysia	1	1	0	2
4	Japan*	1	0	2	3
5	Indonesia	0	1	3	4
6	Philippines	0	1	1	2
6	South Korea	0	1	1	2
8	India	0	0	1	1
8	Laos	0	0	1	1
8	Myanmar	0	0	1	1
Totals (10 entries)		6	6	11	23

== Medalists ==
=== Men ===
Event	Gold	Silver	Bronze
Quadrant	Japan; Yuki Sato; Wataru Narawa; Ryota Haruhara; Seiya Takano; Yota Ichikawa; Toshitaka Naito	Indonesia; Muhammad Hardiansyah Muliang; Jelki Ladada; Saiful Rijal; Yudha Aswinatama; Muhammad Ubaidur Rohman; Andi Try Sandi Saputra	India; Arun Raju; Bobby Kumar; Lokhon Singh Elangbam; Malemnganba Singh Sorokhaibam; Ram Kumar Sharma; Akash Yumnam
Quadrant	Japan; Yuki Sato; Wataru Narawa; Ryota Haruhara; Seiya Takano; Yota Ichikawa; Toshitaka Naito	Indonesia; Muhammad Hardiansyah Muliang; Jelki Ladada; Saiful Rijal; Yudha Aswinatama; Muhammad Ubaidur Rohman; Andi Try Sandi Saputra	Myanmar; Ye Htet; Zaw Min Khant; Thet Paing Soe; Aung Myo Kyaw; Zin Min Oo; Shein Wunna Zaw
Regu	Thailand; Wuttinun Kamsanor; Kritsanapong Nontakote; Tanaphon Sapyen; Phutawan Sopa; Pornthep Tinbangbon	Malaysia; Mohd Syahir Mohd Rosdi; Muhd Zulkifli Abd Razak; Mohamad Azlan Alias; Muhd Afifuddin Mohd Razali; Aidil Aiman Azwawi	Philippines; Reynaldo Asilum Jr. Ronsited Gabayeron; Jason Huerte; Glindel Phori; Jom Lerry Rafael
Regu	Thailand; Wuttinun Kamsanor; Kritsanapong Nontakote; Tanaphon Sapyen; Phutawan Sopa; Pornthep Tinbangbon	Malaysia; Mohd Syahir Mohd Rosdi; Muhd Zulkifli Abd Razak; Mohamad Azlan Alias; Muhd Afifuddin Mohd Razali; Aidil Aiman Azwawi	Vietnam; Đậu Văn Hoàng; Lương Công Minh; Ngô Thành Long; Nguyễn Văn Nhân; Phạm Quốc Thịnh
Team regu	Malaysia; Mohd Syahir Mohd Rosdi; Muhd Haziq Hairul Nizam; Muhd Zulkifli Abd Razak; Muhd Zarif Marican; Muhd Hafizul Hayazi; Farhan Adam; Amirul Zazwan Amir; Mohd Azlan Alias; Zuleffendi Sumari; Muhd Afifuddin Mohd Razali; Muhd Shahalril Aiman; Muhd Noraizat Mohd Nordin; Aidil Azman Azwawi	Thailand; Wuttinun Kamsanor; Sittipong Khamchan; Kritsanapong Nontakote; Jirasak Pakbuangoen; Pichet Pansan; Marukin Phanmakon; Poottipong Pukdee; Tanaphon Sapyen; Phutawan Sopa; Kritsada Sungvung; Wichan Temkort; Pornthep Tinbangbon	Indonesia; Andi Try Sandi Saputra; Gelvin A. Usman; Jelki Ladada; Muh. Hardiansyah Muliang; Muh. Ubaidur Rohman; Rizki Yusuf Djaina; Saiful Rijal; Syamsul Akmal; Yudha Aswinatama
Team regu	Malaysia; Mohd Syahir Mohd Rosdi; Muhd Haziq Hairul Nizam; Muhd Zulkifli Abd Razak; Muhd Zarif Marican; Muhd Hafizul Hayazi; Farhan Adam; Amirul Zazwan Amir; Mohd Azlan Alias; Zuleffendi Sumari; Muhd Afifuddin Mohd Razali; Muhd Shahalril Aiman; Muhd Noraizat Mohd Nordin; Aidil Azman Azwawi	Thailand; Wuttinun Kamsanor; Sittipong Khamchan; Kritsanapong Nontakote; Jirasak Pakbuangoen; Pichet Pansan; Marukin Phanmakon; Poottipong Pukdee; Tanaphon Sapyen; Phutawan Sopa; Kritsada Sungvung; Wichan Temkort; Pornthep Tinbangbon	Japan; Ryota Haruhara; Yota Ichikawa; Hirokazu Kobayashi; Ikki Mito; Toshitaka Naito; Wataru Narawa; Masaki Sasamoto; Yuki Sato; Seiya Takano; Shuma Takata; Daishi Tamaki; Shun Yuasa

=== Women ===
Event	Gold	Silver	Bronze
Quadrant	Vietnam; Nguyễn Thị Mỹ; Trần Thị Ngọc Yến; Hoang Thị Thu Thao; Lê Ngoc Tuyet; Nguyễn Thị Ngọc Huyền; Nguyễn Thị Yến	Thailand; Ratsamee Thongsod; Manlika Bunthod; Somruedee Pruepruk; Masaya Duangsri; Wiphada Chitphuan; Ratchaneekorn Saeheang	Indonesia; Kusnelia; Dini Mita Sari; Wan Annisa Rachmadi; Choirunnisa; Fujy Anggy Lestari; Dita Pratiwi
Quadrant	Vietnam; Nguyễn Thị Mỹ; Trần Thị Ngọc Yến; Hoang Thị Thu Thao; Lê Ngoc Tuyet; Nguyễn Thị Ngọc Huyền; Nguyễn Thị Yến	Thailand; Ratsamee Thongsod; Manlika Bunthod; Somruedee Pruepruk; Masaya Duangsri; Wiphada Chitphuan; Ratchaneekorn Saeheang	Japan; Minami Onda; Chinatsu Izawa; Chinatsu Toriumi; Patricia Nao Kawlu; Kayo Togami; Nagisa Makio
Doubles	Vietnam; Lê Thị Hồng Liên; Nguyễn Thị Khánh Ly; Nguyễn Thị Thu Trang	Philippines; Nelly Jay Salon; Abegail Sinogbuhan; Jean Marie Sucalit	South Korea; Han Ye-ji; Kim Se-young; Lee Min-ju
Doubles	Vietnam; Lê Thị Hồng Liên; Nguyễn Thị Khánh Ly; Nguyễn Thị Thu Trang	Philippines; Nelly Jay Salon; Abegail Sinogbuhan; Jean Marie Sucalit	Laos; Sonsavan Keosouliya; Norkham Vongxay; Koy Xayavong
Team regu	Thailand; Manlika Bunthod; Wiphada Chitphuan; Masaya Duangsri; Wilaiwan Khodphom; Athikan Kongkaew; Pruksa Maneewong; Somruedee Pruepruk; Kaewjai Pumsawangkaew; Ratchaneekorn Saeheang; Nipaporn Salupphon; Usa Srikhamlue; Ratsamee Thongsod	South Korea; Bae Chae-eun; Bae Han-oul; Choi Ji-na; Han Ye-ji; Jang Ga-yeon; Jeon Gyu-mi; Kim Ji-young; Kim Se-young; Kim Ye-ji; Lee Min-ju; Park Seon-ju; Wi Ji-seon	Indonesia; Ayvonne Halimatu Zahra Perdhana; Choirunnisa; Dita Pratiwi; Dini Mita Sari; Frisca Kharisma Indrasari; Fujy Anggy Lestari; Kusnelia; Wan Annisa Rachmadi; Yuliana

== Draw ==
The draw for the competition was held on 23 July 2026.

=== Men's ===
==== Regu ====
Group A

- Thailand
- Philippines
- Japan (host)

Group B

- Malaysia
- Vietnam
- Myanmar

==== Quadrant ====
Group A

- Myanmar
- India
- Laos
- Vietnam

Group B

- Indonesia
- Singapore
- South Korea
- Japan (host)

==== Team regu ====
Group A

- Thailand
- Laos
- Indonesia
- South Korea

Group B

- Malaysia
- India
- Philippines
- Japan (host)

=== Women's ===
==== Doubles ====
Group A

- Vietnam
- Malaysia
- Myanmar
- Laos

Group B

- Philippines
- South Korea
- India
- Japan (host)

==== Quadrant ====
Group A

- Vietnam
- Philippines
- Thailand
- India

Group B

- Indonesia
- Malaysia
- Laos
- Japan (host)

==== Team regu ====
Group

- Indonesia
- Japan (host)
- South Korea
- Thailand

== Participating nations ==
- Indonesia (18)
- India (21)
- Japan (24)
- South Korea (24)
- Laos (19)
- Malaysia (21)
- Myanmar (14)
- Philippines (21)
- Singapore (6)
- Thailand (24)
- Vietnam (20)
