= Vietnam at the 2026 Asian Games =

- IOC code: VIE
- NOC: Vietnam Olympic Committee

in Aichi–Nagoya, Japan 19 September – 4 October 2026
- Competitors: 348 in 29 sports
- Medals Ranked 20th: Gold 3 Silver 3 Bronze 19 Total 25

Asian Games appearances (overview)
- 1954; 1958; 1962; 1966; 1970; 1974; 1978; 1982; 1986; 1990; 1994; 1998; 2002; 2006; 2010; 2014; 2018; 2022; 2026

Vietnam is competing at the 2026 Asian Games in the Aichi Prefecture and Nagoya, Japan from 19 September to 4 October 2026.

The Vietnamese team consisted of 348 athletes (173 men and 175 women) in 29 sports (30 disciplines). Including officials, the delegation consisted of 498 members.

== Medal summary ==
Medal	Name	Sport	Event	Date
Gold	Bùi Ngọc Nhi; Hoàng Thị Thu Uyên; Nguyễn Ngọc Trâm	Karate	Women's team kata	22 September
Gold	Nguyễn Thị Thu Trang; Nguyễn Thị Khánh Ly; Lê Thị Hồng Liên	Sepak takraw	Women's doubles	29 September
Gold	Nguyễn Thị My; Trần Thị Ngọc Yến; Nguyễn Thị Yến; Nguyễn Thị Ngọc Huyền; Hoàng Thị Thu Thảo; Lê Ngọc Tuyết	Sepak takraw	Women's quadrant	3 October
Silver	Đinh Văn Tâm	Wushu	Men's sanda 56kg	24 September
Silver	Nguyễn Thị Tâm	Boxing	Women's 51 kg	02 October
Silver	Châu Ngọc Tuyết Sang	Taekwondo	Virtual mixed individual	02 October
Bronze	Nguyễn Hoàng Minh Tân; Trịnh Gia Nghi	Teqball	Mixed doubles	20 September
Bronze	Bùi Ngọc Nhi	Karate	Women's individual kata	20 September
Bronze	Nguyễn Thị Diệu Ly	Karate	Women's Kumite -68kg Final	21 September
Bronze	Bùi Thúy Thu Thủy; Trịnh Thu Vinh; Nguyễn Thùy Trang	Shooting	Women's team 10 m air pistol	23 September
Bronze	Dương Thúy Vi	Wushu	Women's taolu jianshu & qiangshu	23 September
Bronze	Nguyễn Thị Thu Thủy	Wushu	Women's sanda 60kg	23 September
Bronze	Nguyễn Khắc Kiên	Wushu	Men's sanda 65kg	23 September
Bronze	Hứa Văn Đoàn	Wushu	Men's sanda 60kg	23 September
Bronze	Phạm Thị Ngọc Anh; Lê Thị Hiền; Hà Thị Vui; Dư Thị Bông	Rowing	Coxless four	24 September
Bronze	Phạm Thị Bích Ngọc; Trần Thị Tú Uyên	Rowing	Double sculls	24 September
Bronze	Trần Công Tình; Lại Nguyễn Anh Khoa; Hồng Phát; Văn Phúc An; Diệp Chí Hiếu	Esports	Naraka: Bladepoint	24 September
Bronze	Phạm Thị Huệ; Đinh Thị Hảo	Rowing	Coxless pair	24 September
Bronze	Trần Dương Nghĩa; Thái Bảo Toàn; Hoàng Văn Đạt; Nguyễn Phú	Rowing	Coxless four	24 September
Bronze	Trần Minh Trí	Weightlifting	Men's 65 kg	24 September
Bronze	Nguyễn Thị Ngọc; Quách Thị Lan; Tạ Ngọc Tưởng; Lê Ngọc Phúc	Athletics	Mixed 4 × 400 metres relay	24 September
Bronze	Nguyễn Thị Hương; Diệp Thị Hương	Canoeing	Women's C-2 500 m	25 September
Bronze	Đậu Văn Hoàng; Lương Công Minh; Ngô Thành Long; Nguyễn Văn Nhân; Phạm Quốc Thịnh	Sepak takraw	Men's regu	28 September
Bronze	Lưu Diễm Quỳnh	Boxing	Women's 75 kg	30 September
Bronze	Nguyễn Đăng Khoa; Trần Duy Sang; Đinh Anh Tài; Lê Văn Hoàng Hải; Trần Duy Đức; Hoàng Công Nghĩa	Esports	League of Legends	1 October

Medals by sport
Sport	1st place, gold medalist(s)	2nd place, silver medalist(s)	3rd place, bronze medalist(s)	Total
Athletics	0	0	1	1
Boxing	0	1	1	2
Canoeing	0	0	1	1
Esports	0	0	2	2
Karate	1	0	2	3
Rowing	0	0	4	4
Sepak takraw	2	0	1	3
Shooting	0	0	1	1
Taekwondo	0	1	0	1
Teqball	0	0	1	1
Weightlifting	0	0	1	1
Wushu	0	1	4	5
Total	3	3	19	25

Medals by gender
Gender	1st place, gold medalist(s)	2nd place, silver medalist(s)	3rd place, bronze medalist(s)	Total
Male	0	1	7	6
Female	3	2	10	15
Mixed	0	0	2	2
Total	3	3	19	25

Medals by date
Date	1st place, gold medalist(s)	2nd place, silver medalist(s)	3rd place, bronze medalist(s)	Total
20 September	0	0	2	2
21 September	0	0	1	1
22 September	1	0	0	1
23 September	0	0	5	5
24 September	0	1	7	8
25 September	0	0	1	1
26 September	0	0	0	0
27 September	0	0	0	0
28 September	0	0	1	1
29 September	1	0	0	1
30 September	0	0	1	1
01 October	0	0	1	1
02 October	0	2	0	2
03 October	1	0	0	1
04 October	0	0	0	0
Total	3	3	19	25

== Competitors ==
The following is a list of the number of competitors representing Vietnam that will participate at the Asian Games:

Sport	Men	Women	Total
Archery	6	6	12
Athletics	7	18	25
Badminton	3	3	6
Beach volleyball	4	4	8
Boxing	1	5	6
Breaking	2	2	4
Canoeing	4	7	11
Cycling	3	3	6
Esports	23	0	23
Fencing	7	3	10
Football	23	23	46
Golf	3	2	5
Gymnastics	5	3	8
Handball	0	16	16
Judo	0	2	2
Ju-jitsu	7	6	13
Karate	5	4	9
Kurash	0	4	4
Mixed martial arts	1	1	2
Rowing	8	16	24
Sailing	2	1	3
Sepak takraw	11	9	20
Shooting	8	7	15
Swimming	8	2	10
Taewondo	4	4	8
Teqball	3	1	4
Volleyball	12	12	24
Weightlifting	2	2	4
Wrestling	3	4	7
Wushu	2	4	6
Total	167	173	340

== Archery ==
=== Compound ===
Athlete	Event	Ranking round		Round of 64	Round of 32	Round of 16	Quarter-finals	Semi-finals	Final / BM	
Athlete	Event	Score	Seed	Opposition Score	Opposition Score	Opposition Score	Opposition Score	Opposition Score	Opposition Score	Rank
Đặng Công Đức	Men's individual	709-34x	6	—N/a	Davaasambuu (MGL); W 147–136	Tyutyun (KAZ); W 148–146	Choi Y-h (KOR); W 146–143	Chang C-w (TPE); L 144–145	Thirumuru (IND); L 144–149	4
Trần Xuân Hưởng	Men's individual	699-15x	27	—N/a	Did not advance					
Nguyễn Văn Đầy	Men's individual	700-26x	23	—N/a	Muhammad Ghazalli (MAS); L 147–148	Did not advance				
Lê Phạm Ngọc Anh	Women's individual	701-25x	7	Bye	Nguyễn (VIE); W 144–143	Cojuangco (PHI); L 143–146	Did not advance			
Lê Thùy Phương Nhi	Women's individual	685-22x	34	Did not advance						
Nguyễn Thị Thanh Thảo	Women's individual	688-17x	33	Bye	Lê (VIE); L 143–144	Did not advance				
Đặng Công Đức; Trần Xuân Hưởng; Nguyễn Văn Đầy	Men's team	2108-90x	5	—N/a		Philippines; W 235–228	Chinese Taipei; L 232–232	Did not advance		
Lê Phạm Ngọc Anh; Lê Thùy Phương Nhi; Nguyễn Thị Thanh	Women's team	2074-81x	9	—N/a		Malaysia; W 229–227	China; L 223–226	Did not advance		
Lê Phạm Ngọc Anh; Đặng Công Đức	Mixed team	1410-56x	4	—N/a		Bhutan; W 158–150	Thailand; L 153–156	Did not advance		

=== Recurve ===
Athlete	Event	Ranking round		Round of 64	Round of 32	Round of 16	Quarter-finals	Semi-finals	Final / BM	
Athlete	Event	Score	Rank	Opposition Score	Opposition Score	Opposition Score	Opposition Score	Opposition Score	Opposition Score	Rank
Nguyễn Duy	Men's individual	677-17x	15	Bye	Chong (MAS); L 5–6	Did not advance				
Nguyễn Hoàng Phi Vũ	Men's individual	656-7x	36	Did not advance						
Nguyễn Minh Đức	Men's individual	656-10x	35	Rustamov (TJK); W 6–2	Nakanishi (JPN); L 2–6	Did not advance				
Nguyễn Duy; Nguyễn Hoàng Phi Vũ; Nguyễn Minh Đức	Men's team	1989-56x	9	—N/a	Bye	Mongolia; L 3–5	Did not advance			
Hoàng Phương Thảo	Women's individual	653-6x	21	Bye	Kirti (IND); L 3–7	Did not advance				
Lộc Thị Đào	Women's individual	653-6x	8	Bye	Syedabdulhye (QAT); L 5–6	Did not advance				
Triệu Huyền Diệp	Women's individual	613-3x	42	Did not advance						
Hoàng Phương Thảo; Lộc Thị Đào; Triệu Huyền Diệp	Women's team	1934-43x	7	—N/a		Uzbekistan; W 6–0	China; L 4–5	Did not advance		
Lộc Thị Đào; Nguyễn Duy	Mixed team	1345-39x	7	—N/a		Iran; W 6–2	India; L 0–6	Did not advance		

== Athletics ==
Track events
Men

Athlete	Event	Heats		Semi-final		Final	
Athlete	Event	Result	Rank	Result	Rank	Result	Rank
Tạ Ngọc Tưởng	400 m	46.07	3	—N/a		Did not advance	
Nguyễn Trung Cường	3000 m steeplechase	—N/a				8:57.71	6

Women

Athlete	Event	Heats		Semi-final		Final	
Athlete	Event	Result	Rank	Result	Rank	Result	Rank
Lê Thị Cẩm Tú	200 m	23.38	1 Q	—N/a		23.53	7
Hoàng Thị Minh Hạnh	400 m	54.46	5	—N/a		Did not advance	
Lê Thị Tuyết	10,000 m	—N/a				38:00.87	13
Nguyễn Thị Oanh	10,000 m	—N/a				33:44.92	6

Relay events

Athlete	Event	Heats		Final	
Athlete	Event	Result	Rank	Result	Rank
Tạ Ngọc Tưởng; Lê Ngọc Phúc; Vũ Ngọc Khánh; Trần Nhật Hoàng; Trần Đình Sơn	Men's 4 × 400 m relay	3:04.17	2 Q	3:35.71	8
Lê Thị Cẩm Tú; Hà Thị Thu; Hoàng Dư Ý Phùng Thị Huệ; Kha Thanh Trúc	Women's 4 × 100 m relay	44.06	3 Q	44.28	6
Nguyễn Thị Ngọc; Hoàng Thị Minh Hạnh; Nguyễn Thị Hằng; Quách Thị Lan; Lê Thị Tuyết Mai	Women's 4 × 400 m relay	—N/a		3:32.28	5
Nguyễn Thị Ngọc; Nguyễn Thị Hằng; Quách Thị Lan; Tạ Ngọc Tưởng; Lê Ngọc Phúc; Vũ Ngọc Khánh	Mixed 4 × 400 m relay	3:16.08	2 Q	3:14.54	3rd place, bronze medalist(s)

Field events
Men

Athlete	Event	Final	
Athlete	Event	Result	Rank
Hồ Trọng Mạnh Hùng	Triple Jump	15.82	8

Women

Athlete	Event	Final	
Athlete	Event	Result	Rank
Dương Thị Thảo	High Jump	1.80	6
Hà Thị Thúy Hằng	Long Jump	5.95	11
Trần Thị Loan	Long Jump	6.18	7
Nguyễn Thị Hương	Triple Jump	NM	—N/a
Vũ Thị Ngọc Hà	Triple Jump	13.13	9

Combined events
Women

Athlete	Event	Category	100H	HJ	SP	200 m	LJ	JT	800 m	Total	Rank
Hoàng Thanh Giang	Heptathlon	Result	14.78	1.71	9.38	25.79	5.84	32.06	DNS	DNF	
Hoàng Thanh Giang	Heptathlon	Points	871	867	489	816	801	516	DNS	DNF	

== Badminton ==
Singles

Athlete	Event	Round of 64	Round of 32	Round of 16	Quarterfinals	Semi-finals	Final	
Athlete	Event	Opposition Score	Opposition Score	Opposition Score	Opposition Score	Opposition Score	Opposition Score	Rank
Nguyễn Hải Đăng	Men	Ebrahim (BHR); W 2–0	Abdurakhimov (TJK); W 2–0	Vitidsarn (THA); L 0–2	Did not advance			
Nguyễn Thùy Linh	Women	Bye	Wiryawan (INA); W 2–0	Chen (CHN); L 1–2	Did not advance			

== Boxing ==
Men

Boxer	Event	Round of 32	Round of 16	Quarterfinals	Semi-finals	Final	Rank
Boxer	Event	Opposition Result	Opposition Result	Opposition Result	Opposition Result	Opposition Result	Rank
Nguyễn Đức Ngọc	70 kg	Dbichi (QAT); L 0–5	Did not advance				

Women

Boxer	Event	Round of 32	Round of 16	Quarterfinals	Semi-finals	Final	Rank
Boxer	Event	Opposition Result	Opposition Result	Opposition Result	Opposition Result	Opposition Result	Rank
Nguyễn Thị Tâm	51 kg	Shrestha (NEP); W 5–0	Guo (TPE); W 4–1	Bak (KOR); W 5–0	Balkibekova (KAZ); W 5–0	Wu (CHN) –	
Võ Thị Kim	54 kg						
Hà Thị Linh	60 kg						
Hoàng Ngọc Mai	65 kg						
Lưu Diễm Quỳnh	75 kg						

== Breaking ==
Athlete	Event	Pre-selection		Round of 16	Quarter-finals	Semi-finals	Final	Rank
Athlete	Event	Point	Rank	Opposition Score	Opposition Score	Opposition Score	Opposition Score	Rank
Nguyễn Văn Hữu	B-Boys							
Nguyễn Thành Đạt	B-Boys							
Nguyễn Thị Hồng Trâm	B-Girls							
Võ Thị Thanh Hương	B-Girls							

== Canoeing ==
Sprint

Athlete	Event	Heats		Semi-final		Final	
Athlete	Event	Time	Rank	Time	Rank	Time	Rank
Huỳnh Cao Minh	Men's K-1 500m						
Vũ Lê Thiên Hải; Nguyễn Minh Tuấn	Men's K-2 500m						
Diệp Thị Hương	Women's C-1 200m						
Diệp Thị Hương; Nguyễn Thị Hương	Women's C-2 500m						
Hoàng Thị Hương	Women's K-1 500m						
Bùi Mai Hạnh; Hoàng Thị Lâm	Women's K-2 500m						
Bùi Mai Hạnh; Đỗ Thị Thanh Thảo; Hoàng Thị Lâm; Hoàng Thị Hương	Women's K-4 500m						
Nguyễn Hồng Thái; Hiên Năm	Mixed C-2 500m						
Đỗ Thị Thanh Thảo; Huỳnh Cao Minh	Mixed K-2 500m						

== Cycling ==
Road

Athlete	Event	Final	
Athlete	Event	Time	Rank
Phạm Lê Xuân Lộc	Men's Individual Time Trial	45:33.19	12
Nguyễn Hướng	Men's Road Race		
Phạm Lê Xuân Lộc	Men's Road Race		
Quàng Văn Cường	Men's Road Race		
Nguyễn Thị Thật	Women's Road Race		
Nguyễn Thị Thi	Women's Road Race		
Nguyễn Thị Thu Mai	Women's Road Race		

== Esports ==
As of 23 July 2026, Vietnam has qualified for five events through qualifying tournaments held in Ho Chi Minh City, Kuala Lumpur, and Singapore.

Team

Athlete	Event	Group Stage				Quarterfinal	Semifinal	Final / BM	
Athlete	Event	Opposition Score	Opposition Score	Opposition Score	Rank	Opposition Score	Opposition Score	Opposition Score	Rank
Trần Quang Đăng; Phạm Hà Lâm; Nguyễn Hoàng Hữu Tình; Quách Võ Anh Minh; Bùi Mạnh Nguyên; Nguyễn Liêu Tuấn Hưng; Nguyễn Việt Thành	Identity V	Hong Kong L 0–2	South Korea L 1–1	Malaysia L 0–2	4	Did not advance			
Trần Công Tình; Lại Nguyễn Anh Khoa; Hồng Phát; Văn Phúc An Khang; Diệp Chí Hiếu	Naraka: Bladepoint	Hong Kong W 2–0	Philippines W 2–0	Chinese Taipei W 2–0	1 Q	—N/a	Thailand L 2–3	Did not advance	3rd place, bronze medalist(s)
Nguyễn Đăng Khoa; Trần Duy Sang; Đinh Anh Tài; Lê Văn Hoàng Hải; Trần Duy Đức; Hoàng Công Nghĩa	League of Legends	Saudi Arabia W 1–0	Malaysia W 1–0	United Arab Emirates W 1–0	1 Q	—N/a	Chinese Taipei L 0–2	Did not advance	3rd place, bronze medalist(s)
Phạm Văn Trung; Nguyễn Ngọc Thiện; Nguyễn Anh Quân; Phạm Văn Hiếu; Võ Minh Thắng	PUBG Mobile								4

== Fencing ==
Individual

Athlete	Event	Preliminaries						Round of 32	Round of 16	Quarterfinals	Semi-finals	Final
Athlete	Event	Opposition Score	Opposition Score	Opposition Score	Opposition Score	Opposition Score	Rank	Opposition Score	Opposition Score	Opposition Score	Opposition Score	Opposition Score
Hoàng Nhật Nam	Men's Épée											
Nguyễn Phước Đến	Men's Épée											
Nguyễn Phương Kim	Women's Épée											
Trần Thị Thùy Trinh	Women's Épée											
Nguyễn Văn Quyết	Men's Sabre											
Nguyễn Xuân Lợi	Men's Sabre											

Team

Athlete	Event	Round of 16	Quarterfinals	Semi-finals	Final	
Athlete	Event	Opposition Score	Opposition Score	Opposition Score	Opposition Score	Rank
Nguyễn Phước Đến; Hoàng Nhật Nam; Nguyễn Tiến Nhật; Nguyễn Minh Hiếu	Men's épée					
Trần Thị Thùy Trinh; Nguyễn Thị Kiều Oanh; Nguyễn Phương Kim	Women's épée					
Nguyễn Văn Quyết; Nguyễn Xuân Lợi; Lê Văn Bang	Men's Sabre					

== Football ==
Summary

Team	Event	Group stage				Quarterfinal	Semifinal	Final / BM	
Team	Event	Opposition Score	Opposition Score	Opposition Score	Rank	Opposition Score	Opposition Score	Opposition Score	Rank
Vietnam men's	Men's tournament	Kuwait; D 1–1	Philippines; W 2–0	Uzbekistan; L 0–2	2 Q	South Korea; L 0–4	Did not advance		7
Vietnam women's	Women's tournament	Chinese Taipei; L 1–2	Japan; L 0–8	Thailand; D 0–0	3 Q	China; L 0–1 (a.e.t.)	Did not advance		8

=== Men's tournament ===
Team roster

Vietnam announced their final squad on 9 September. Phạm Đình Hải and Nguyễn Công Phương withdrew on 11 September and were replace by Nguyễn Bảo Ngọc and Hoàng Quang Dũng.

Head coach: Đinh Hồng Vinh

No.	Pos.	Player	Date of birth (age)	Caps	Goals	Club
1	GK	Cao Văn Bình	8 January 2005 (age 21)	15	0	(Vietnam Football Federation) Sông Lam Nghệ An
2	DF	Nguyễn Lương Tuấn Khải	14 November 2006 (age 19)	0	0	(Vietnam Football Federation) Huế
3	DF	Phạm Lý Đức (captain)	14 February 2003 (age 23)	20	1	(Vietnam Football Federation) Công An Nhân Dân
4	DF	Lê Nguyên Hoàng	14 February 2005 (age 21)	15	0	(Vietnam Football Federation) Sông Lam Nghệ An
5	DF	Nguyễn Đức Anh	16 May 2003 (age 23)	14	0	(Vietnam Football Federation) Hà Nội
6	MF	Nguyễn Hoàng Khanh	26 March 2006 (age 20)	0	0	(Vietnam Football Federation) Thể Công-Viettel
7	FW	Nguyễn Thanh Nhàn	28 July 2003 (age 23)	33	5	(Vietnam Football Federation) Công An Nhân Dân
8	MF	Nguyễn Thái Quốc Cường	6 March 2004 (age 22)	16	0	(Vietnam Football Federation) Công An HCMC
9	FW	Nguyễn Quốc Việt	4 May 2003 (age 23)	44	9	(Vietnam Football Federation) Ninh Bình
10	MF	Hoàng Quang Dũng	18 February 2005 (age 21)	0	0	(Vietnam Football Federation) Huế
11	MF	Lê Văn Thuận	15 July 2006 (age 20)	22	3	(Vietnam Football Federation) Ninh Bình
12	MF	Nguyễn Xuân Bắc	3 February 2003 (age 23)	24	1	(Vietnam Football Federation) Công An Nhân Dân
13	GK	Nguyễn Bảo Ngọc	28 March 2007 (age 19)	0	0	(Vietnam Football Federation) Sông Lam Nghệ An
14	MF	Nguyễn Quang Vinh	27 January 2005 (age 21)	3	0	(Vietnam Football Federation) Sông Lam Nghệ An
15	DF	Đặng Tuấn Phong	7 February 2003 (age 23)	8	0	(Vietnam Football Federation) Hải Phòng
16	FW	Nguyễn Lê Phát	12 January 2007 (age 19)	10	2	(Vietnam Football Federation) Ninh Bình
17	MF	Nguyễn Phi Hoàng	27 March 2003 (age 23)	28	0	(Vietnam Football Federation) Công An HCMC
18	DF	Đinh Quang Kiệt	16 July 2007 (age 19)	2	0	(Vietnam Football Federation) Công An HCMC
19	FW	Nguyễn Ngọc Mỹ	20 February 2004 (age 22)	14	1	(Vietnam Football Federation) Ninh Bình
20	DF	Nguyễn Quốc Toản	8 January 2006 (age 20)	3	0	(Vietnam Football Federation) Quy Nhơn United
21	MF	Phạm Minh Phúc	7 February 2004 (age 22)	19	3	(Vietnam Football Federation) Công An Nhân Dân
22	MF	Lê Đình Long Vũ	27 May 2006 (age 20)	7	0	(Vietnam Football Federation) Sông Lam Nghệ An
23	GK	Hoa Xuân Tín	29 January 2008 (age 18)	0	0	(Vietnam Football Federation) Công An HCMC

Group play

Pos	Team	Pld	W	D	L	GF	GA	GD	Pts	Qualification
1	Uzbekistan	3	3	0	0	9	1	+8	9	Advance to knockout stage
2	Vietnam	3	1	1	1	3	3	0	4	Advance to knockout stage
3	Philippines	3	1	0	2	3	8	−5	3	
4	Kuwait	3	0	1	2	2	5	−3	1	

Source: Aichi–Nagoya 26
15 September 2026
19:00

Vietnam	1–1	Kuwait
Nguyễn Ngọc Mỹ 80'	Report	Al-Matar 78'

CS Asset Minato Soccer Stadium, Nagoya
Attendance: 1,058
Referee: Kim Woo-sung (South Korea)

18 September 2026
15:30

Philippines	0–2	Vietnam
	Report	Nguyễn Thanh Nhàn 74'; Nguyễn Lê Phát 88'

CS Asset Minato Soccer Stadium, Nagoya
Attendance: 513
Referee: Hiroki Kasahara (Japan)

22 September 2026
14:00

Vietnam	0–2	Uzbekistan
	Report	Urinboev 5'; Ibraimov 67'

Paloma Mizuho Rugby Stadium, Nagoya
Attendance: 4,134
Referee: Meder Taichiev (Kyrgyzstan)

=== Women's tournament ===
Team roster

The following players list is the Vietnam squad for the 2026 Asian Games.

Head coach: Hoàng Văn Phúc

No.	Pos.	Player	Date of birth (age)	Caps	Goals	Club
1	GK	Lê Thị Thu	1 August 2007 (age 19)	0	0	(Vietnam Football Federation) Phong Phu Ha Nam
2	DF	Lương Thị Thu Thương	1 May 2000 (age 26)	42	0	(Vietnam Football Federation) Than KSVN
4	DF	Ngô Thị Hồng Nhung	5 September 2000 (age 26)	0	0	(Vietnam Football Federation) Ho Chi Minh City
5	DF	Hoàng Thị Loan	6 February 1995 (age 31)	45	3	(Vietnam Football Federation) Hanoi
6	DF	Nguyễn Thị Hoa	28 November 2000 (age 25)	9	0	(Vietnam Football Federation) Hanoi
7	FW	Ngọc Minh Chuyên	23 June 2004 (age 22)	10	1	(Vietnam Football Federation) Thai Nguyen T&T
8	MF	Nguyễn Thị Trúc Hương	4 March 2000 (age 26)	18	1	(Vietnam Football Federation) Than KSVN
10	FW	Lưu Hoàng Vân	9 April 2006 (age 20)	0	0	(Vietnam Football Federation) Phong Phu Ha Nam
11	MF	Thái Thị Thảo	12 February 1995 (age 31)	67	18	(Vietnam Football Federation) Hanoi
12	FW	Phạm Hải Yến (captain)	9 November 1994 (age 31)	100	57	(Vietnam Football Federation) Hanoi
13	DF	Lê Thị Diễm My	6 March 1994 (age 32)	38	0	(Vietnam Football Federation) Than KSVN
14	GK	Trần Thị Kim Thanh	18 September 1993 (age 33)	68	0	(Vietnam Football Federation) Ho Chi Minh City
15	MF	Vũ Thị Hoa	6 November 2003 (age 23)	8	0	(Vietnam Football Federation) Hanoi
16	MF	Dương Thị Vân	20 September 1994 (age 32)	60	3	(Vietnam Football Federation) Thai Nguyen T&T
17	MF	Trần Thị Thu Xuân	21 December 2002 (age 23)	1	0	(Vietnam Football Federation) Ho Chi Minh City
18	DF	Cù Thị Huỳnh Như	7 August 2000 (age 26)	7	0	(Vietnam Football Federation) Ho Chi Minh City
19	DF	Nguyễn Thị Thanh Nhã	25 September 2001 (age 25)	47	7	(Vietnam Football Federation) Hanoi
20	GK	Khổng Thị Hằng	10 October 1993 (age 33)	36	0	(Vietnam Football Federation) Thai Nguyen T&T
21	MF	Ngân Thị Vạn Sự	29 April 2001 (age 25)	52	14	(Vietnam Football Federation) Hanoi
23	MF	Nguyễn Thị Bích Thùy	1 May 1994 (age 32)	90	25	(Vietnam Football Federation) Thai Nguyen T&T
24	FW	Nguyễn Thị Thúy Hằng	19 November 1997 (age 28)	24	6	(Vietnam Football Federation) Thai Nguyen T&T
25	DF	Nguyễn Thị Tuyết Ngân	10 February 2000 (age 26)	9	1	(Vietnam Football Federation) Ho Chi Minh City
26	DF	Trần Thị Thu Phương	1 February 2002 (age 24)	0	0	(Vietnam Football Federation) Than KSVN

Group play

Pos	Team	Pld	W	D	L	GF	GA	GD	Pts	Qualification
1	Japan (H)	3	3	0	0	20	0	+20	9	Advance to knockout stage
2	Chinese Taipei	3	2	0	1	3	5	−2	6	Advance to knockout stage
3	Vietnam	3	0	1	2	1	10	−9	1	Advance to knockout stage
4	Thailand	3	0	1	2	0	9	−9	1	

Source: Aichi–Nagoya 26
(H) Hosts
14 September 2026
16:00

Chinese Taipei	2–1	Vietnam
Su Yu-hsuan 16'; Wakabayashi 81'	Report	Nguyễn Thị Thanh Nhã 86'

Shizuoka Stadium, Fukuroi
Attendance: 352
Referee: Park Se-jin (South Korea)

17 September 2026
19:30

Vietnam	0–8	Japan
	Report	Kamiya 12', 52'; Shiokoshi 19'; Cù Thị Huỳnh Như 43' (o.g.); Hamada 45+3'; Nishio 78'; Narumiya 81'; Yumura 90+2'

Shizuoka Stadium, Fukuroi
Attendance: 1,029
Referee: Esraa Al-Mbaiden (Jordan)

21 September 2026
19:30

Vietnam	0–0	Thailand
	Report

Nagai Stadium, Osaka
Attendance: 483
Referee: Veronika Bernatskaia (Kyrgyzstan)

== Golf ==
Individual

Golfer	Event	Round 1	Round 2	Round 3	Round 4	Total		
Golfer	Event	Score	Score	Score	Score	Score	To Par	Rank
Lê Khánh Hưng	Men	77	70	Cut		147	+7	—
Nguyễn Anh Minh	Men	71	71	67	69	278	–2	T17
Nguyễn Tuấn Anh	Men	69	74	75	75	293	+13	T35
Lê Nguyễn Minh Anh	Women	72	80	Cut		152	+12	—
Nguyễn Khánh Linh	Women	73	75	Cut		148	+8	—

Team

Golfer	Event	Round 1	Round 2	Round 3	Round 4	Total		
Golfer	Event	Score	Score	Score	Score	Score	To Par	Rank
Lê Khánh Hưng; Nguyễn Anh Minh; Nguyễn Tuấn Anh	Men	140	141	141	135	557	–3	11
Lê Nguyễn Minh Anh; Nguyễn Khánh Linh	Women	145	155	Cut		300	+20	—

== Gymnastics ==
=== Artistic ===
==== Men's ====
Individual events

Athlete	Event	Qualification								Final							
Athlete	Event	Apparatus						Total	Rank	Apparatus						Total	Rank
Athlete	Event	F	PH	R	V	PB	HB	Total	Rank	F	PH	R	V	PB	HB	Total	Rank
Đỗ Nam Anh	All-round	See team results above															
Trần Đình Vương	All-round	See team results above															
Đỗ Nam Anh	Floor		—N/a														
Trịnh Hải Khang	Floor		—N/a														
Đặng Ngọc Xuân Thiện	Pommel horse	—N/a		—N/a													
Trần Đình Vương	Pommel horse	—N/a		—N/a													
Nguyễn Văn Khánh Phong	Rings	—N/a			—N/a												
Trần Đình Vương	Rings	—N/a			—N/a												
Đỗ Nam Anh	Vault	—N/a				—N/a											
Trịnh Hải Khang	Vault	—N/a				—N/a											
Nguyễn Văn Khánh Phong	Parallel bars	—N/a					—N/a										
Trần Đình Vương	Parallel bars	—N/a					—N/a										
Đỗ Nam Anh	Horizontal bars	—N/a															
Trịnh Hải Khang	Horizontal bars	—N/a															

==== Women's ====
Individual events

Athlete	Event	Qualification						Final					
Athlete	Event	Apparatus				Total	Rank	Apparatus				Total	Rank
Athlete	Event	V	UB	B	F	Total	Rank	V	UB	B	F	Total	Rank
Huỳnh Thiên Lý	All-round	See team results above											
Trần Đoàn Quỳnh Nam	All-round	See team results above											
Nguyễn Thị Quỳnh Như	Vault		—N/a										
Huỳnh Thiên Lý	Uneven bars	—N/a	—N/a										
Trần Đoàn Quỳnh Nam	Uneven bars	—N/a											
Huỳnh Thiên Lý	Balance beam	—N/a			—N/a								
Trần Đoàn Quỳnh Nam	Balance beam	—N/a			—N/a								
Huỳnh Thiên Lý	Floor	—N/a											
Trần Đoàn Quỳnh Nam	Floor	—N/a											

== Handball ==
Summary

Team	Event	Group stage						Rank
Team	Event	Opposition Score	Opposition Score	Opposition Score	Opposition Score	Opposition Score	Opposition Score	Rank
Vietnam women's	Women's tournament	Japan; L 14–40	Hong Kong; L 23–26	Kazakhstan; L 25–29	Uzbekistan; L 21–29	South Korea; L 18–46	China; L 27–37	7

=== Women's tournament ===
Team rosters

- Nguyễn Thanh Huyền (1)
- Huỳnh Gia Mỹ (2)
- Nguyễn Thị Diễm Quỳnh (3)
- Hà Thị Thu Huệ (8)
- Võ Bé Tư (6)
- Hà Thị Hạnh (7)
- Đàm Thị Thanh Huyền (8)
- Hoàng Thị Lan Anh (9)
- Nguyễn Thị Ánh Tuyết (10)
- Đỗ Thị Tú Hảo (12)
- Nguyễn Ngọc Thảo (14)
- Trần Hải Yến (17)
- Phạm Thị Loan (18)
- Đỗ Thị Huyền Trang (19)
- Đỗ Thị Như Quỳnh (26)
- Phùng Thị Linh Trang (27)

Group play

Pos	Team	Pld	W	D	L	GF	GA	GD	Pts
1st place, gold medalist(s)	South Korea	6	6	0	0	243	105	+138	12
2nd place, silver medalist(s)	Japan (H)	6	5	0	1	217	120	+97	10
3rd place, bronze medalist(s)	China	6	4	0	2	189	154	+35	8
4	Kazakhstan	6	3	0	3	164	187	−23	6
5	Uzbekistan	6	2	0	4	116	206	−90	4
6	Hong Kong	6	1	0	5	131	209	−78	2
7	Vietnam	6	0	0	6	128	207	−79	0

Source: asiangames2026.org
(H) Hosts

19 September 2026; 12:00	Japan	40–14	Vietnam	Kasugai City Gymnasium; Referees: Allayarova, Razakbergenova (UZB)
19 September 2026; 12:00	Matsuura 10	(19–5)	Đàm 5	Kasugai City Gymnasium; Referees: Allayarova, Razakbergenova (UZB)
19 September 2026; 12:00	1× (suspension)	Report	1× (suspension)	Kasugai City Gymnasium; Referees: Allayarova, Razakbergenova (UZB)

20 September 2026; 15:30	Vietnam	23–26	Hong Kong	Kasugai City Gymnasium; Referees: Mozafari, Mazaheri (IRI)
20 September 2026; 15:30	Phạm, Phùng 5	(9–11)	Wu 14	Kasugai City Gymnasium; Referees: Mozafari, Mazaheri (IRI)
20 September 2026; 15:30	1× (yellow card) 4× (suspension)	Report	2× (suspension)	Kasugai City Gymnasium; Referees: Mozafari, Mazaheri (IRI)

22 September 2026; 13:30	Vietnam	25–29	Kazakhstan	Kasugai City Gymnasium; Referees: Lee, Lee (KOR)
22 September 2026; 13:30	Nguyễn T.A. 8	(14–14)	Seitkassym, Zhaparova 6	Kasugai City Gymnasium; Referees: Lee, Lee (KOR)
22 September 2026; 13:30	4× (suspension)	Report	1× (suspension)	Kasugai City Gymnasium; Referees: Lee, Lee (KOR)

25 September 2026; 12:30	Vietnam	21–29	Uzbekistan	Toyoda Gosei Memorial Gymnasium; Referees: Cha, Pak (KOR)
25 September 2026; 12:30	Phùng 5	(13–15)	Mullaeva 8	Toyoda Gosei Memorial Gymnasium; Referees: Cha, Pak (KOR)
25 September 2026; 12:30	2× (suspension)	Report	5× (suspension)	Toyoda Gosei Memorial Gymnasium; Referees: Cha, Pak (KOR)

26 September 2026; 17:30	South Korea	46–18	Vietnam	Toyoda Gosei Memorial Gymnasium; Referees: Abo, Al-Rashed (JOR)
26 September 2026; 17:30	Jo 8	(22–9)	Nguyễn T.A. 10	Toyoda Gosei Memorial Gymnasium; Referees: Abo, Al-Rashed (JOR)
26 September 2026; 17:30	1× (suspension)	Report	5× (suspension) 1× (red card)	Toyoda Gosei Memorial Gymnasium; Referees: Abo, Al-Rashed (JOR)

27 September 2026; 15:30	China	37–27	Vietnam	Toyoda Gosei Memorial Gymnasium; Referees: Razakbergenova, Allayarova (UZB)
27 September 2026; 15:30	Qu 7	(17–13)	Nguyễn T.A. 10	Toyoda Gosei Memorial Gymnasium; Referees: Razakbergenova, Allayarova (UZB)
27 September 2026; 15:30		Report		Toyoda Gosei Memorial Gymnasium; Referees: Razakbergenova, Allayarova (UZB)

== Ju-jitsu ==
Athlete	Event	Round of 32	Round of 16	Quarter-finals	Semi-finals	Final / BM
Athlete	Event	Opposition Result	Opposition Result	Opposition Result	Opposition Result	Rank
Cấn Văn Thắng	Men's 62 kg					
Đặng Đình Tùng	Men's 69 kg					
Lê Trọng Hoàng	Men's 69 kg					
Nguyễn Tất Lộc	Men's 77 kg					
Nguyễn Tiến Triển	Men's 85 kg					
Lê Duy Thành	Men's 94 kg					
Lê Minh Nhựt	Men's 94 kg					
Phùng Thị Huệ	Women's 48 kg					
Vương Trần Hoài Thương	Women's 48 kg					
Trần Hồng Ân	Women's 52 kg					
Trần Thị Thanh Hà	Women's 52 kg					
Ngô Thị Thảo Vân	Women's 63 kg					
Nguyễn Thị Minh Vương	Women's 63 kg					

== Judo ==
Athlete	Event	Round of 16	Repechange	Semi-finals	Final / BM	
Athlete	Event	Opposition Result	Opposition Result	Opposition Result	Opposition Result	Rank
Hà Ngọc Chi	Women's 48 kg					
Lâm Thị Ngân Hà	Women's 52 kg					

== Karate ==
Men

Athlete	Event	Round of 16	Quarterfinals	Semifinals	Repechage	Final / BM	
Athlete	Event	Opposition Result	Opposition Result	Opposition Result	Opposition Result	Opposition Result	Rank
Phạm Minh Đức	Individual kata	Thheng (CAM); W 3–2	Al-Mosawi (TPE); L 0–5	Did not advance			
Giang Việt Anh; Phạm Minh Đức; Phạm Trường Giang	Team kata	—N/a	Kuwait; L 0–5	Did not advance	—N/a	Malaysia; L 2–3	5
Chu Văn Đức	–60 kg	Battör (MGL); W 4–0	Abdelhamid (QAT); L 4–10	Did not advance	Turakhonov (UZB); W 3–3	Hari Sankar (MAS); L 2–10	5
Khuất Hải Nam	–67 kg	Kozaki (JPN); L 2–3	Did not advance		Al-Assiri (KSA); W 7–3	Shih C-c (TPE); L 3–9	5

Women

Athlete	Event	Round of 16	Quarterfinals	Semifinals	Repechage	Final / BM	
Athlete	Event	Opposition Result	Opposition Result	Opposition Result	Opposition Result	Opposition Result	Rank
Bùi Ngọc Nhi	Individual kata	Ono (JPN); L 0–5	Did not advance		Choi H-e (KOR); W 5–0	Leong (SGP); W 4–1	3rd place, bronze medalist(s)
Bùi Ngọc Nhi; Hoàng Thị Thu Uyên; Nguyễn Ngọc Trâm	Team kata	—N/a	Nepal; W 5–0	Chinese Taipei; W 5–0	—N/a	Iran; W 5–0	1st place, gold medalist(s)
Nguyễn Thị Diệu Ly	–68 kg	Bye	Li Qq (CHN); L 1–4	Did not advance	—N/a	Kama (JPN); W 4–4	3rd place, bronze medalist(s)

== Kurash ==
Athlete	Event	Round of 16	Quarterfinal	Semi-final	Final	Rank
Athlete	Event	Opposition Result	Opposition Result	Opposition Result	Opposition Result	Rank
Nguyễn Thị Hường	Women's 57 kg					
Phạm Nguyễn Hồng Mơ	Women's 57 kg					
Dương Thanh Thanh	Men's +87 kg					
Trần Thị Thanh Thuỷ	Men's +87 kg					

== Mixed martial arts ==
Summary

Athlete	Event	Qualification	Quarterfinals	Semifinals	Repechage	Final / BM	
Athlete	Event	Opposition Result	Opposition Result	Opposition Result	Opposition Result	Opposition Result	Rank
Lò Thị Phung	Women's Modern -54 kg	Torekhanova (KAZ); W 3–0	Lee (KOR); L 1–2	Did not advance			
Quàng Văn Minh	Men's Traditional -77 kg	Nabiev (BHR); L 0–3	Did not advance				

== Rowing ==
Sculling

Athlete	Event	Heat		Repechage/ Semi-final		Final	
Athlete	Event	Time	Rank	Time	Rank	Time	Rank
Nguyễn Văn Hà; Bùi Văn Hoan; Nguyễn Văn Hiếu; Nguyễn Hữu Thanh	Men's quadruple						
Hà Ngọc Linh Nhi	Women's single						
Trần Thị Tú Uyên; Phạm Thị Bích Ngọc	Women's double						
Hồ Thị Duy	Women's lightweight single						
Trần Thị Thu Hằng; Lương Thị Thảo	Women's lightweight double						
Nguyễn Thị Giang; Phạm Thị Thảo; Nguyễn Thị Vân Anh; Bùi Thị Thu Hiền	Women's quadruple						

Sweeping

Athlete	Event	Heat		Repechage/ Semi-final		Final	
Athlete	Event	Time	Rank	Time	Rank	Time	Rank
Trần Dương Nghĩa; Nguyễn Phú	Men's pair						
Thái Bảo Toàn; Trần Dương Nghĩa; Hoàng Văn Đạt; Nguyễn Phú	Men's four						
Đinh Thị Hảo; Phạm Thị Huệ	Women's pair						
Dư Thị Bông; Hà Thị Vui; Lê Thị Hiền; Phạm Thị Ngọc Anh	Women's four						

== Sailing ==
Athlete	Event	Race																			Total Points	Net Points	Final Rank
Athlete	Event	1	2	3	4	5	6	7	8	9	10	11	12	13	14	15	16	17	18	MR	Total Points	Net Points	Final Rank
Thạch Phát	Men's ILCA 7																						
Mai Thanh Nhật	Boys' ILCA 4																						
Nguyễn Thị Nhung	Women's ILCA 6																						

== Sepak takraw ==
=== Men ===
Athlete	Event	Group stage				Semifinal	Final	
Athlete	Event	Opposition score	Opposition score	Opposition score	Rank	Opposition score	Opposition score	Rank
	Men's regu	Malaysia; L 0–2	Myanmar; W 2–0	—N/a	2 Q	Thailand; L 0–2	Did not advance	3rd place, bronze medalist(s)
	Quadrant	Myanmar; W 2–1	India; L 0–2	Laos; L 0–2	4	Did not advance		

=== Women ===
Athlete	Event	Group stage				Semifinal	Final	
Athlete	Event	Opposition score	Opposition score	Opposition score	Rank	Opposition score	Opposition score	Rank
	Women's quadrant	India; W 2–0	Thailand; W 2–0	Philippines; W 2–0	1 Q	Japan; W 2–0	Thailand; W 2–1	1st place, gold medalist(s)
	Women's double	Malaysia; W 2–0	Myanmar; W 2–0	Laos; L 1–2	2 Q	South Korea; W 2–0	Philippines; W 2–0	1st place, gold medalist(s)

== Shooting ==
=== Men ===
Individual

Athlete	Event	Qualification		Final	
Athlete	Event	Points	Rank	Points	Rank
Lại Công Minh	10 m air pistol	581-20x	7 Q	115.3	8
Nguyễn Đình Thành	10 m air pistol	571-13x	26	Did not advance	
Phạm Quang Huy	10 m air pistol	570-17x	28	Did not advance	
Phạm Quang Huy	25 m rapid fire pistol	578-18x	7 Q	20-18x	4
Hà Minh Thành	25 m rapid fire pistol	569-11x	18	Did not advance	
Vũ Tiến Nam	25 m rapid fire pistol	560-12x	24	Did not advance	
Nguyễn Minh Quang	10 m air rifle	623.8	27	Did not advance	
Nguyễn Minh Quang	50 m rifle 3 position	572-18x	29	Did not advance	
Nguyễn Tâm Quang	10 m air rifle	620.1	33	Did not advance	
Nguyễn Tâm Quang	50 m rifle 3 position	570-18x	30	Did not advance	
Phùng Việt Dũng	10 m air rifle	627.0	15	Did not advance	
Phùng Việt Dũng	50 m rifle 3 position	575-19x	26	Did not advance	

Team

Athlete	Event	Final	
Athlete	Event	Points	Rank
Lại Công Minh; Nguyễn Đình Thành; Phạm Quang Huy	10 m air pistol	1722-50x	7
Hà Minh Thành; Phạm Quang Huy; Vũ Tiến Nam	25 m rapid fire pistol	1707-41x	5
Nguyễn Minh Quang; Nguyễn Tâm Quang; Phùng Việt Dũng	10 m air rifle	1870.9	8
Nguyễn Minh Quang; Nguyễn Tâm Quang; Phùng Việt Dũng	50 m rifle 3 position	1717-55x	9

=== Women ===
Individual

Athlete	Event	Qualification		Final	
Athlete	Event	Points	Rank	Points	Rank
Bùi Thúy Thu Thủy	10 m air pistol	568-12x	25	Did not advance	
Nguyễn Thuỳ Trang	10 m air pistol	577-15x	5 Q	159.7	6
Nguyễn Thuỳ Trang	25 m pistol	578-20x	12	Did not advance	
Trịnh Thu Vinh	10 m air pistol	574-19x	11	Did not advance	
Trịnh Thu Vinh	25 m pistol	585-22x	3 Q	30	4
Nguyễn Thùy Dung	25 m pistol	569-14x	28	Did not advance	
Dương Hà My	10 m air rifle	629.5	13	Did not advance	
Dương Hà My	50 m rifle 3 position	582-23x	23	Did not advance	
Lê Thị Mộng Tuyền	10 m air rifle	625.3	27	Did not advance	
Lê Thị Mộng Tuyền	50 m rifle 3 position	585-20x	16	Did not advance	
Phí Thanh Thảo	10 m air rifle	629.5	14	Did not advance	
Phí Thanh Thảo	50 m rifle 3 position	574-18x	39	Did not advance	

Team

Athlete	Event	Final	
Athlete	Event	Points	Rank
Bùi Thúy Thu Thủy; Nguyễn Thuỳ Trang; Trịnh Thu Vinh	10 m air pistol	1719-46x	3rd place, bronze medalist(s)
Nguyễn Thùy Dung; Nguyễn Thuỳ Trang; Trịnh Thu Vinh	25 m pistol	1732-56x	4
Dương Hà My; Phí Thanh Thảo; Lê Thị Mộng Tuyền	10 m air rifle team	1884.3	5
Dương Hà My; Phí Thanh Thảo; Lê Thị Mộng Tuyền	50 m rifle 3 position	1741-61x	10

=== Mixed ===
Team

Athlete	Event	Qualification		Final	
Athlete	Event	Points	Rank	Points	Rank
Phạm Quang Huy; Trịnh Thu Vinh	10 m air pistol	578-15x	5	Did not advance	
Nguyễn Tâm Quang; Phí Thanh Thảo	10 m air rifle	DSQ			

== Swimming ==
Men

Athlete	Event	Heats		Repecharge		Final	
Athlete	Event	Time	Rank	Time	Rank	Time	Rank
Trần Hưng Nguyên	200 m individual medley	1:58.04	11	Did not advance			
Nguyễn Quang Thuấn	200 m individual medley	2:02.78	14	Did not advance			

Women

Athlete	Event	Heats		Repecharge		Final	
Athlete	Event	Time	Rank	Time	Rank	Time	Rank
Nguyễn Thúy Hiền	50 m breaststroke	32.28	10 Q	Bye		31.96	8
Võ Thị Mỹ Tiên	200 m butterfly	2:13.33	8 Q	Bye		2:13.53	8

== Teqball ==
Singles

Athlete	Event	Group stage						Quarterfinal	Semifinal	Repechage	Final / BM	
Athlete	Event	Opposition Score	Opposition Score	Opposition Score	Opposition Score	Opposition Score	Rank	Opposition Score	Opposition Score	Opposition Score	Opposition Score	Rank
Bá Trường Giang	Men	Putra (INA); L (12–7, 11–12, 8–12)	Wase (JPN); L (12–11, 10–12, 8–12)	Agustin (PHI); L (8–12, 12–5, 14–16)	Lee J-s (KOR); L (8–12, 4–12)	Alisa (LAO); W (12–5, 12–6)	5	Did not advance				

Doubles

Team	Event	Group stage						Quarterfinal	Semifinal	Repechage	Final / BM	
Team	Event	Opposition Score	Opposition Score	Opposition Score	Opposition Score	Opposition Score	Rank	Opposition Score	Opposition Score	Opposition Score	Opposition Score	Rank
Bá Trường Giang; Lê Anh Khoa	Men	Gonsalves / Beg (IND); W (12–10, 12–8)	Lee J-s / Lee T-b (KOR); W (12–7, 12–9)	—N/a			1 Q	Arabi / Hafez (LBN); L (7–12, 10–12)	Did not advance	Lee J-s / Lee T-b (KOR); W (12–8, 11–12, 12–9)	Radhi / Alelayawi (IRQ); L (12–7, 9–12, 7–12)	5
Nguyễn Hoàng Minh Tân; Trịnh Gia Nghi	Mixed	Sakamoto / Wase (JPN); W (12–11, 12–7)	Radhi / Abed (IRQ); L (11–12, 7–12)	Inthalapheth / Phonexay (LAO); W (12–7, 12–6)	Kim Eun-j / Jang E-s (KOR); W (12–10, 11–12, 13–11)	Aidarbekov / Otorbaeva (KGZ); W (12–1, 12–5)	2 Q	Dsouza / Beg (IND); W (12–7, 12–10)	Dejaroen / Wongkhamchan (THA); L (8–12, 5–12)	—N/a	Dsouza / Beg (IND) (12–9, 12–6)	3rd place, bronze medalist(s)

== Volleyball ==
Both the men's and women's national volleyball teams of the Vietnam have qualified for the indoor volleyball tournaments of the 2026 Asian Games. They earned their place via FIVB rankings. The men's and women's beachball teams also qualified.

=== Indoor ===
Summary

Team	Event	Group stage				Quarterfinal / 9th–16th Classification	5th–8th / 9th–12th Classification	7th place match / 9th place match	
Team	Event	Opposition Score	Opposition Score	Opposition Score	Rank	Opposition Score	Opposition Score	Opposition Score	Rank
Vietnam men's	Men's tournament	Qatar; L 0–3	India; L 0–3	Hong Kong; W 3–1	3	Uzbekistan; W 3–0	Indonesia; W 3–1	Chinese Taipei; L 1–3	10
Vietnam women's	Women's tournament	Qatar; W 3–0	Hong Kong; W 3–0	South Korea; L 1–3	2 Q	China; L 0–3	Indonesia; L 0–3	Kazakhstan; W 3–0	7

==== Men's tournament ====
Team roster

- Tăng Ngọc Hiếu
- Bùi Xuân Tiến
- Trần Minh Đức
- Đinh Văn Duy
- Nguyễn Ngọc Thuân
- Trần Duy Tuyến
- Trương Thế Khải
- Trịnh Duy Phúc
- Cao Đức Hoàng
- Phạm Quốc Dư
- Dương Văn Tiên
- Trần Hoài Phương

Group play

Pos	Team	Pld	W	L	Pts	SW	SL	SR	SPW	SPL	SPR	Qualification
1	India	3	3	0	8	9	2	4.500	275	246	1.118	Quarterfinals
2	Qatar	3	2	1	7	8	4	2.000	297	280	1.061	Quarterfinals
3	Vietnam	3	1	2	3	3	7	0.429	230	238	0.966	Classification 9th–16th
4	Hong Kong	3	0	3	0	2	9	0.222	234	272	0.860	Classification 9th–16th

Source: asiangames2026.org
Rules for classification: Tiebreakers

==== Women's tournament ====
Team roster

- Nguyễn Thị Trà My
- Trần Thị Thanh Thúy
- Bùi Thị Ánh Thảo
- Phạm Quỳnh Hương
- Lê Thanh Thúy
- Vi Thị Yến Nhi
- Lê Như Anh
- Nguyễn Khánh Đang
- Võ Thị Kim Thoa
- Lưu Thị Huệ
- Lê Thị Yến
- Trần Thị Bích Thủy

Group play

Pos	Team	Pld	W	L	Pts	SW	SL	SR	SPW	SPL	SPR	Qualification
1	South Korea	3	3	0	9	9	1	9.000	251	157	1.599	Quarterfinals
2	Vietnam	3	2	1	6	7	3	2.333	238	176	1.352	Quarterfinals
3	Hong Kong	3	1	2	3	3	6	0.500	177	179	0.989	Classification 9th–12th
4	Qatar	3	0	3	0	0	9	0.000	71	225	0.316	Classification 9th–14th

Source: asiangames2026.org
Rules for classification: Tiebreakers

== Wushu ==
=== Taolu ===
Men

Athlete	Event	Event 1		Event 2		Total	Rank
Athlete	Event	Result	Rank	Result	Rank	Total	Rank
Nguyễn Văn Sỹ	Changquan	9.603	12	—N/a		9.603	12
Vũ Văn Tuấn	Daoshu & gunshu	9.326	9	9.650	7	18.976	8
Đỗ Đức Tài	Nanquan & nangun	9.213	15	9.680	10	18.893	13
Nguyễn Trọng Lâm	Taijiquan & taijijian	9.710	6	9.643	12	19.353	10

Women

Athlete	Event	Event 1		Event 2		Total	Rank
Athlete	Event	Result	Rank	Result	Rank	Total	Rank
Nguyễn Thị Hiền	Changquan	9.573	14	—N/a		9.573	14
Dương Thúy Vi	Jianshu & qiangshu	9.703	4	9.710	3	19.413	3rd place, bronze medalist(s)
Đặng Trần Phương Nhi	Nanquan & nandao	9.140	10	9.170	10	18.310	10

=== Sanda ===
Men

WPD — Won by point difference
WKO — Won by technical knockout

Athlete	Event	Round of 16	Quarter-finals	Semi-finals	Final	
Athlete	Event	Opposition Score	Opposition Score	Opposition Score	Opposition Score	Rank
Đinh Văn Tâm	–56 kg	Baylon (PHI); W 2–0	Amin (PAK); W 2–0	Sinaga (INA); W 2–0	Ou (CHN); L 0–2	2nd place, silver medalist(s)
Hứa Văn Đoàn	–60 kg	Iminzhanov (KAZ); W 2–0	Kim (KOR); W 2–0	Tang (CHN); L WPD	Did not advance	3rd place, bronze medalist(s)
Nguyễn Khắc Kiên	–65 kg	Oudomdeth (LAO); W 2–0	Alipio (PHI); W 2–0	Panahigelehkolaei (IRN); L 0–2	Did not advance	3rd place, bronze medalist(s)
Trương Văn Chưởng	–70 kg	Un (MAC); W 2–0	Ablagatov (KAZ); L WKO	Did not advance		5

Women

WPD — Won by point difference

Athlete	Event	Round of 16	Quarter-finals	Semi-finals	Final	
Athlete	Event	Opposition Score	Opposition Score	Opposition Score	Opposition Score	Rank
Ngô Thị Phương Nga	–52 kg	Purevjav (MGL); W WPD	Sinkaeichetan (IRN); L 0-2	Did not advance		5
Nguyễn Thị Thu Thuỷ	–60 kg	Shossova (KAZ); W 2-0	Jorayeva (TKM); W WPD	Zhang (CHN); L WPD	Did not advance	3rd place, bronze medalist(s)
