= Canoeing at the 2026 Asian Games – Mixed C-2 500 metres =

Mixed C-2 500 metres at the 2026 Asian Games
- Venue: Miyoshi Lake
- Date: 26 September 2026
- Competitors: 18 from 9 nations

Medalists
gold medal	Wu Shengyue; Ma Yanan	China
silver medal	Vladlen Denisov; Nilufar Zokirova	Uzbekistan
bronze medal	Sergey Yemelyanov; Rufina Iskakova	Kazakhstan

The mixed sprint C-2 (canoe double) 500 metres competition at the 2026 Asian Games was held on 26 September 2026.

== Schedule ==
All times are Japan Standard Time (UTC+09:00)

Date	Time	Event
Saturday, 26 September 2026	11:50	Final A

== Results ==
=== Final ===
Rank	Team	Time	Notes
1st place, gold medalist(s)	China (CHN); Wu Shengyue; Ma Yanan	1:48.377	
2nd place, silver medalist(s)	Uzbekistan (UZB); Vladlen Denisov; Nilufar Zokirova	1:49.674	
3rd place, bronze medalist(s)	Kazakhstan (KAZ); Sergey Yemelyanov; Rufina Iskakova	1:51.124	
4	Iran (IRI); Mohammad Nabi Rezaei; Hiva Afzali	1:54.373	
5	Indonesia (INA); Sofiyanto; Herlin Aprilin Lali	1:55.731	
6	Thailand (THA); Pitpiboon Mahawattanangkul; Aphinya Sroichit	1:55.795	
7	Vietnam (VIE); Hiền Nam; Nguyễn Hồng Thái	1:58.013	
8	India (IND); Raju Rawat; Neha Devi Leichonbam	2:00.891	
9	South Korea (KOR); Kim Yi-yeol; Lee Ye-lin	2:03.078	
