= Canoeing at the 2026 Asian Games – Men's K-1 500 metres =

Men's K-1 500 metres at the 2026 Asian Games
- Venue: Miyoshi Lake
- Date: 24–26 September 2026

Medalists
gold medal	Shakhriyor Makhkamov	Uzbekistan
silver medal	Jang Sang-won	South Korea
bronze medal	Dmitriy Kholmogorov	Kazakhstan

The men's sprint K-1 (kayak single) 500 metres competition at the 2026 Asian Games was held from 24 to 26 September 2026.

== Schedule ==
All times are Japan Standard Time (UTC+09:00)

Date	Time	Event
Thursday, 24 September 2026	14:30	Heats
Thursday, 24 September 2026	10:00	Semifinal
Thursday, 24 September 2026	11:20	Final B
Thursday, 24 September 2026	11:40	Final A

== Results ==
=== Heats ===
- Qualification: 1–3 → Final (QF), Rest → Semifinal (QS)

==== Heat 1 ====
Rank	Team	Time	Notes
1	Shakhriyor Makhkamov (UZB)	1:43.611	QF
2	Dmitriy Kholmogorov (KAZ)	1:45.970	QF
3	Jang Sang-won (KOR)	1:49.269	QF
4	Ther Tristan Loo (SGP)	1:49.847	QS
5	Vu Le Thien Hai (VIE)	1:50.069	QS
6	Chang Long Yin (HKG)	1:55.286	QS
7	Natthaphat Chaichanthuek (THA)	2:02.214	QS

==== Heat 2 ====
Rank	Team	Time	Notes
1	Taishi Tanada (JPN)	1:43.475	QF
2	Ali Aghamirzaei (IRI)	1:43.647	QF
3	Rodion Tuigunov (KGZ)	1:43.783	QF
4	Hsieh Chia-cheng (TPE)	1:47.511	QS
5	Harshwardhan Singh Shaktawat (IND)	1:55.140	QS
6	Erdembayar Enkhbat (MGL)	2:40.502	QS

=== Semifinal ===
- Qualification: 1–3 → Final (QF)

Rank	Athlete	Time	Notes
1	Vu Le Thien Hai (VIE)	1:48.408	QF
2	Ther Tristan Loo (SGP)	1:48.630	QF
3	Hsieh Chia-cheng (TPE)	1:49.857	QF
4	Harshwardhan Singh Shaktawat (IND)	1:50.543	
5	Natthaphat Chaichanthuek (THA)	1:55.033	
6	Chang Long Yin (HKG)	1:56.782	
7	Erdembayar Enkhbat (MGL)	2:40.108	

=== Finals ===
==== Final B ====
Rank	Athlete	Time	Notes
1	Harshwardhan Singh Shaktawat (IND)	1:52.458	
2	Natthaphat Chaichanthuek (THA)	1:56.339	
3	Chang Long Yin (HKG)	1:56.652	
	Erdembayar Enkhbat (MGL)	DNS	

==== Final A ====
Rank	Athlete	Time	Notes
1st place, gold medalist(s)	Shakhriyor Makhkamov (UZB)	1:43.642	
2nd place, silver medalist(s)	Jang Sang-won (KOR)	1:44.433	
3rd place, bronze medalist(s)	Dmitriy Kholmogorov (KAZ)	1:44.453	
4	Ali Aghamirzaei (IRI)	1:45.190	
5	Taishi Tanada (JPN)	1:45.382	
6	Rodion Tuigunov (KGZ)	1:46.691	
7	Hsieh Chia-cheng (TPE)	1:50.105	
8	Ther Tristan Loo (SGP)	1:52.170	
9	Vu Le Thien Hai (VIE)	1:55.494	
