= Canoeing at the 2026 Asian Games – Women's C-1 200 metres =

Women's C-1 200 metres at the 2026 Asian Games
- Venue: Miyoshi Lake
- Date: 23–24 September 2026

Medalists
gold medal	Shokhsanam Sherzodova	Uzbekistan
silver medal	Shuai Changwen	China
bronze medal	Herlin Aprilin Lali	Indonesia

The women's sprint C-1 (canoe single) 200 metres competition at the 2026 Asian Games was held on 23 and 24 September 2026.

== Schedule ==
All times are Japan Standard Time (UTC+09:00)

Date	Time	Event
Wednesday, 23 September 2026	10:20	Heats
Thursday, 24 September 2026	10:00	Semifinal
Thursday, 24 September 2026	11:30	Final

== Results ==
=== Heats ===
- Qualification: 1–3 → Final (QF), Rest → Semifinal (QS)

==== Heat 1 ====
Rank	Team	Time	Notes
1	Shokhsanam Sherzodova (UZB)	46.942	QF
2	Herlin Aprilin Lali (INA)	47.530	QF
3	Orasa Thiangkathok (THA)	48.795	QF
4	Hiva Afzali (IRI)	49.308	QS
5	Megha Pradeep (IND)	49.675	QS
6	Maria Batgerel (MGL)	1:47.885	QS

==== Heat 2 ====
Rank	Team	Time	Notes
1	Shuai Changwen (CHN)	47.305	QF
2	Diệp Thị Hương (VIE)	48.115	QF
3	Lee Ye-lin (KOR)	49.265	QF
4	Cha Un Yong (PRK)	49.442	QS
5	Mio Kobayashi (JPN)	50.321	QS

=== Semifinal ===
- Qualification: 1–3 → Final (QF)

Rank	Athlete	Time	Notes
1	Hiva Afzali (IRI)	49.427	QF
2	Cha Un Yong (PRK)	49.979	QF
3	Mio Kobayashi (JPN)	50.891	QF
4	Megha Pradeep (IND)	51.093	
5	Maria Batgerel (MGL)	1:48.957	

=== Final ===
Rank	Athlete	Time	Notes
1st place, gold medalist(s)	Shokhsanam Sherzodova (UZB)	46.597	
2nd place, silver medalist(s)	Shuai Changwen (CHN)	46.613	
3rd place, bronze medalist(s)	Herlin Aprilin Lali (INA)	47.309	
4	Diệp Thị Hương (VIE)	47.642	
5	Lee Ye-lin (KOR)	48.183	
6	Orasa Thiangkathok (THA)	48.329	
7	Hiva Afzali (IRI)	49.220	
8	Cha Un Yong (PRK)	49.862	
9	Mio Kobayashi (JPN)	51.037	
