= Yuki Sato (sepak takraw) =

Japanese sepak takraw player

Personal information
- Nationality: Japanese
- Born: 16 December 1988 (age 37) Noda, Chiba, Japan
- Education: Asia University
- Employer: Hanshin Shuhan
- Height: 179 cm (5 ft 10 in)

Sport
- Sport: Sepak takraw
- Position: Attacker
Medal record
Men's sepak takraw
Representing Japan
Asian Games
| Silver medal – second place | 2018 Jakarta–Palembang | Men's quadrant |
| Bronze medal – third place | 2022 Hangzhou | Men's quadrant |
| Bronze medal – third place | 2026 Aichi-Nagoya | Men's team regu |
| Gold medal – first place | 2026 Aichi-Nagoya | Men's quadrant |
King's Cup World Championships
| Gold medal – first place | 2025 Thailand | Men's quadrant |

Yuki Sato (Japanese: 佐藤 優樹; born 16 December 1988) is a Japanese sepak takraw player who competes as an attacker. He has represented Japan at multiple editions of the Asian Games and the King's Cup World Championships.

== Career ==
Sato was born in Noda, Chiba, and attended Kashiwa Municipal Kashiwa High School before studying at Asia University. He began playing sepak takraw while at university and subsequently became a member of the Japanese national team. He is employed by Hanshin Shuhan and has been selected as an A-ranked attacker in the Japan Sepaktakraw Association's national-team strengthening programme.

Sato made his Asian Games debut at the 2018 Asian Games in Jakarta and Palembang. He competed in the men's quadrant event, where Japan reached the final and won the silver medal. He was also part of Japan's men's team doubles squad, which won a bronze medal.

At the 2022 Asian Games in Hangzhou, Sato again competed in the men's quadrant event and won the bronze medal with Japan.

Sato represented Japan at the 2022 Hangzhou Asian Games as part of a squad that included Yota Ichikawa, Seiya Takano, Ryota Haruhara, Toshitaka Naito and Wataru Narawa in the men's quadrant event.

In 2023, Sato was selected for Japan's team at the 19th Asian Games in Hangzhou, held in 2023 after its postponement. He won another bronze medal in the men's quadrant event.

Sato achieved an international title at the King's Cup World Championships in Thailand in July 2025. He was part of the Japanese men's quadrant team that won the gold medal, giving Japan its first men's gold medal at the tournament and marking a major milestone for Japanese sepak takraw.

In 2026, Sato was named to Japan's national team for the 2026 Asian Games in Aichi-Nagoya. The Japan Sepaktakraw Association listed him as an A-ranked attacker in its national-team strengthening squad, while Asia University confirmed his selection for the Games.

At the 2026 Asian Games, Sato won the bronze medal in the men's team regu event. He then competed in the men's quadrant event, where Japan defeated Indonesia in the final to win the gold medal. The victory was Japan's first Asian Games gold medal in sepak takraw since the sport was introduced to the programme in 1990. Before the 2026 Games, Sato described the competition as the culmination of his career in sepak takraw and said that he had spent about half of his life playing the sport.
