= Ryota Haruhara =

Japanese sepak takraw player

Personal information
- Nationality: Japanese
- Born: 27 November 1998 (age 27) Tokyo, Japan
- Education: Keio University
- Height: 173 cm (5 ft 8 in)

Sport
- Sport: Sepak takraw
- Position: Tosā
Medal record
Men's sepak takraw
Representing Japan
Asian Games
Gold medal – first place	2026 Aichi-Nagoya	Men's quadrant
Bronze medal – third place	2026 Aichi-Nagoya	Men's team regu
Bronze medal – third place	2022 Hangzhou	Men's quadrant
World Championships
Gold medal – first place	2025	Men's quadrant
Bronze medal – third place	2024	Men's quadrant

Ryota Haruhara (Japanese: 春原 涼太; born 27 November 1998) is a Japanese sepak takraw player who plays as a tosā. He represents Japan internationally and has competed at the Asian Games and the King's Cup World Championships.

== Career ==
Haruhara played football for 12 years before taking up sepak takraw after entering Keio University. He joined the Japanese national team while still a university student and graduated from Keio University's Faculty of Economics in 2021.

Haruhara competed at the 2022 Asian Games in Hangzhou in the men's quadrant and team regu events. He won the bronze medal in the men's quadrant.

In domestic competition, Haruhara won the 2023 All Japan Sepaktakraw Championship and the 2024 All Japan Sepaktakraw Open Championship.

At the 2024 King's Cup World Championships in Korat, Thailand, Haruhara was part of the Japanese men's quadrant team that won the bronze medal.

In 2025, Haruhara represented Japan at the King's Cup World Championships in Thailand. Japan won the men's quadrant title, with Haruhara becoming part of the Japanese team that won the country's first world championship in the event.

In January 2026, Haruhara was named an A-ranked tosā in the Japan Sepaktakraw Association's men's national-team strengthening squad. He was selected for Japan's men's team at the 2026 Asian Games in Aichi-Nagoya.

At the 2026 Asian Games, Haruhara competed in the men's team regu and quadrant events. In the men's quadrant final on 3 October, Japan faced Indonesia. Haruhara played as the team's tosā and provided the sets for Japan's attacks as the team defeated Indonesia 2–1 to win the gold medal. The victory was Japan's first Asian Games gold medal in sepak takraw.

The final was a rematch of Japan's earlier meeting with Indonesia in the competition. Japan's victory completed a tournament in which Haruhara was one of the team's principal tosā. He also won a bronze medal in the men's team regu event at the Games.
