= Wataru Narawa =

Japanese sepak takraw player

Personal information
- Native name: 奈良輪 航
- Nationality: Japanese
- Born: 8 October 1997 (age 29) Tokyo, Japan
- Education: Nippon Sport Science University
- Height: 180 cm (5 ft 11 in)

Sport
- Sport: Sepak takraw
- Position: Server
Medal record
Men's sepak takraw
Representing Japan
Asian Games
Gold medal – first place	2026 Aichi-Nagoya	Men's quadrant
Bronze medal – third place	2026 Aichi-Nagoya	Men's team regu
Bronze medal – third place	2022 Hangzhou	Men's quadrant

Wataru Narawa (Japanese: 奈良輪 航; born 8 October 1997) is a Japanese sepak takraw player who plays as a server. He represents Japan internationally and has competed at the Asian Games and the King's Cup World Championships.

== Career ==
Narawa is from Tokyo and attended Tokyo Metropolitan Shakujii High School before studying at Nippon Sport Science University. He played football until the age of 18 and was captain of his high-school football team. He began playing sepak takraw after entering university and was subsequently selected for Japan's national team.

Narawa became a Japan national-team strengthening squad member in 2018 and continued to be selected for the national team in subsequent years.

At the 2022 Asian Games in Hangzhou, Narawa competed in the men's quadrant event and won the bronze medal with Japan.

Following the 2022 Asian Games, Narawa joined the men's sepak takraw team of Tokyo Verdy Club. He competed in domestic competitions and won the men's doubles event at the 2023 All Japan Sepaktakraw Championship.

In 2026, Narawa was named an A-ranked server in the Japan Sepaktakraw Association's men's national-team strengthening squad for the first half of the year.

Narawa was selected for Japan's men's team at the 2026 Asian Games in Aichi-Nagoya. He competed in both the men's team regu and men's quadrant events.

In the men's quadrant final on 3 October 2026, Japan faced Indonesia. Narawa played a role in Japan's defensive play, including blocks, as Japan defeated Indonesia 2–1 to win the gold medal. The victory was Japan's first gold medal in sepak takraw at the Asian Games since the sport was introduced to the programme in 1990.

Narawa also won a bronze medal in the men's team regu event at the 2026 Asian Games.

In August 2026, Narawa represented Japan at the King's Cup World Championships. He was part of Japan's men's quadrant team that finished with the bronze medal after losing to Myanmar in the semi-final.
