= Seiya Takano =

Personal information
- Native name: 髙野 征也
- Nationality: Japanese
- Born: 9 January 1989 (age 37) Hiroshima, Japan
- Education: Takushoku University
- Height: 166 cm (5 ft 5 in)

Sport
- Sport: Sepak takraw
- Position: Tosā
Medal record
Men's sepak takraw
Representing Japan
Asian Games
Gold medal – first place	2026 Aichi-Nagoya	Men's quadrant
Bronze medal – third place	2026 Aichi-Nagoya	Men's team regu
Silver medal – second place	2018 Jakarta–Palembang	Men's quadrant
Bronze medal – third place	2018 Jakarta–Palembang	Men's team doubles
Bronze medal – third place	2014 Incheon	Men's doubles
Bronze medal – third place	2010 Guangzhou	Men's team

Seiya Takano (Japanese: 髙野 征也; born 9 January 1989) is a Japanese sepak takraw player who plays as a tosā (setter). He represents Japan internationally and has competed at multiple editions of the Asian Games.

== Career ==
Takano was born in Hiroshima and attended Sanyo High School before studying at Takushoku University. He began playing sepak takraw while at university after initially planning to continue playing football. He was selected for Japan's development squad within his first year of taking up the sport and subsequently concentrated on sepak takraw.

Takano represented Japan at the 2010 Asian Games in Guangzhou, where he won a bronze medal in the men's team event. At the 2014 Asian Games in Incheon, he won another bronze medal in the men's doubles event.

At the 2016 All Japan Sepaktakraw Open Championship, Takano won the men's title. He also won the 2017 All Japan Sepaktakraw Championship.

At the 2018 Asian Games in Jakarta and Palembang, Takano won the silver medal in the men's quadrant event and the bronze medal in the men's team doubles event. He also won a bronze medal in men's doubles at the 2018 World Sepaktakraw Championships.

In 2019, Takano was part of SC TOKYO, which finished second in the men's division of the All Japan Sepaktakraw Team Championship.

Takano represented Japan at the 2022 Asian Games in Hangzhou in the men's quadrant and team regu events. Japan won the bronze medal in the men's quadrant event; Takano was among the Japanese players listed for the event.

In January 2026, Takano was named a C-ranked tosā in the Japan Sepaktakraw Association's men's national-team strengthening squad for the first half of the year. In April, he was part of SC TOKYO's team that won the men's division of the seventh All Japan Quadrant Championship.

Takano was selected for Japan's men's sepak takraw team at the 2026 Asian Games in Aichi-Nagoya. He was listed among the Japanese representatives as a tosā and represented SC TOKYO.

In the men's quadrant final on 3 October 2026, Japan faced Indonesia. Japan defeated Indonesia 2–1 to win the gold medal. Takano was part of the Japanese squad that secured the victory, which gave Japan its first Asian Games gold medal in sepak takraw since the sport was introduced to the Games in 1990. Japan also won the bronze medal in the men's team regu event at the Games.

In August 2026, Takano also competed in the men's quadrant at the King's Cup World Championships. Japan finished with the bronze medal after losing its semi-final to Myanmar.
