= Sepak takraw at the 2026 Asian Games – Men's regu =

Men's regu at the 2026 Asian Games
- Venue: Paloma Mizuho Arena
- Date: 27–29 September 2026
- Competitors: 30 from 6 nations

Medalists
| gold medal | Thailand |
| silver medal | Malaysia |
| bronze medal | Philippines |
| bronze medal | Vietnam |

The men's regu sepak takraw competition at the 2026 Asian Games is held at Paloma Mizuho Arena, Nagoya, Aichi Prefecture from 27 to 29 September 2026.

Thailand won the gold medal, Malaysia took silver, and Philippines and Vietnam the bronze medals.

== Squads ==
| Japan | Malaysia | Myanmar | Philippines |
|---|---|---|---|
| Yota Ichikawa; Ikki Mito; Masaki Sasamoto; Shuma Takata; Daishi Tamaki | Muhd Zulkifli Abd Razak; Mohamad Azlan Alias; Aidil Aiman Azwawi; Muhd Afifuddin Mohd Razali; Mohd Syahir Mohd Rosdi | Aung Aung; Htoo Aung Kyaw; Kyaw Min Thu; Thant Zin Tun; Yan Paing Oo | Reynaldo Asilum Jr.; Ronsited Gabayeron; Jason Huerte; Glindel Phori; Jom Lerry Rafael |
| Thailand | Vietnam | | |
| Wuttinun Kamsanor; Kritsanapong Nontakote; Tanaphon Sapyen; Phutawan Sopa; Pornthep Tinbangbon | Đậu Văn Hoàng; Lương Công Minh; Ngô Thành Long; Nguyễn Văn Nhân; Phạm Quốc Thịnh | | |

== Results ==
All times are Japan Standard Time (UTC+09:00)

=== Preliminary ===
==== Group A ====
| Pos | Team | Pld | W | L | SF | SA | SD | Pts | Qualification |
|---|---|---|---|---|---|---|---|---|---|
| 1 | Thailand | 2 | 2 | 0 | 4 | 1 | +3 | 4 | Semifinals |
| 2 | Philippines | 2 | 1 | 1 | 2 | 2 | 0 | 2 | Semifinals |
| 3 | Japan | 2 | 0 | 2 | 1 | 4 | −3 | 0 | |

Source: Aichi-Nagoya 2026

| Date | Time | | Score | | Set 1 | Set 2 | Set 3 |
|---|---|---|---|---|---|---|---|
| 27 Sep | 09:00 | Thailand | 2–0 | Philippines | 15–11 | 15–7 | |
| 27 Sep | 14:00 | Thailand | 2–1 | Japan | 15–9 | 16–17 | 15–9 |
| 28 Sep | 10:00 | Philippines | 2–0 | Japan | 15–10 | 15–4 | |

==== Group B ====
| Pos | Team | Pld | W | L | SF | SA | SD | Pts | Qualification |
|---|---|---|---|---|---|---|---|---|---|
| 1 | Malaysia | 2 | 2 | 0 | 4 | 0 | +4 | 4 | Semifinals |
| 2 | Vietnam | 2 | 1 | 1 | 2 | 2 | 0 | 2 | Semifinals |
| 3 | Myanmar | 2 | 0 | 2 | 0 | 4 | −4 | 0 | |

Source: Aichi-Nagoya 2026

| Date | Time | | Score | | Set 1 | Set 2 | Set 3 |
|---|---|---|---|---|---|---|---|
| 27 Sep | 10:00 | Malaysia | 2–0 | Vietnam | 15–9 | 17–15 | |
| 27 Sep | 15:00 | Vietnam | 2–0 | Myanmar | 15–5 | 15–13 | |
| 28 Sep | 09:00 | Malaysia | 2–0 | Myanmar | 15–5 | 15–4 | |

=== Knockout round ===
Semifinals
28 September
Thailand | 2
Vietnam | 0
28 September
Philippines | 1
Malaysia | 2

Gold medal match
29 September
Thailand | 2
Malaysia | 0

==== Semifinals ====
| Date | Time | | Score | | Set 1 | Set 2 | Set 3 |
|---|---|---|---|---|---|---|---|
| 28 Sep | 15:30 | Thailand | 2–0 | Vietnam | 15–7 | 15–6 | |
| 28 Sep | 15:30 | Philippines | 1–2 | Malaysia | 15–10 | 11–15 | 7–15 |

==== Gold medal match ====
| Date | Time | | Score | | Set 1 | Set 2 | Set 3 |
|---|---|---|---|---|---|---|---|
| 29 Sep | 10:30 | Thailand | 2–0 | Malaysia | 15–9 | 15–8 | |
