= Canoeing at the 2026 Asian Games – Women's K-1 500 metres =

Women's K-1 500 metres at the 2026 Asian Games
- Venue: Miyoshi Lake
- Date: 26 September 2026
- Competitors: 8 from 8 nations

Medalists
gold medal	Wang Nan	China
silver medal	Arina Tanatmisheva	Uzbekistan
bronze medal	Stella Sukhanova	Kazakhstan

The women's sprint K-1 (kayak single) 500 metres competition at the 2026 Asian Games was held on 26 September 2026.

== Schedule ==
All times are Japan Standard Time (UTC+09:00)

Date	Time	Event
Saturday, 26 September 2026	11:30	Final

== Results ==
=== Final ===
Rank	Athlete	Time	Notes
1st place, gold medalist(s)	Wang Nan (CHN)	1:55.999	
2nd place, silver medalist(s)	Arina Tanatmisheva (UZB)	1:57.769	
3rd place, bronze medalist(s)	Stella Sukhanova (KAZ)	1:59.688	
4	Chen Jiexian Stephenie (SGP)	2:00.617	
5	Elnaz Shafieian Noveir (IRI)	2:00.733	
6	Ramla Baharuddin (INA)	2:08.808	
7	Hoàng Thị Hương (VIE)	2:09.347	
8	Rina Batgerel (MGL)	3:38.625	
