= Sepak takraw at the 2026 Asian Games – Women's quadrant =

Women's quadrant at the 2026 Asian Games
- Venue: Paloma Mizuho Arena
- Date: 30 September–3 October 2026
- Competitors: 47 from 8 nations

Medalists
gold medal	Vietnam
silver medal	Thailand
bronze medal	Indonesia
bronze medal	Japan

The women's quadrant sepak takraw competition at the 2026 Asian Games is held at Paloma Mizuho Arena, Nagoya, Aichi Prefecture from 30 September to 3 October 2026.

Vietnam won the gold medal, Thailand took silver, and Indonesia and Japan the bronze medals.

== Squads ==
Indonesia	India	Japan	Laos
Choirunnisa; Kusnelia; Fujy Anggy Lestari; Dita Pratiwi; Wan Annisa Rachmadi; Dini Mita Sari	Maipak Devi Ayekpam; Priya Devi Elangbam; Shilpa Elangbam; Chaoba Devi Oinam; Seyiekhrieno Tepa; Malemnganbi Yumnam	Chinatsu Izawa; Patricia Nao Kawlu; Nagisa Makio; Minami Onda; Kayo Togami; Chinatsu Toriumi	Mixaiphone Longmeuangma; May Phiathep; Aksonesavanh Philavong; Janjira Prasangkhon; Sone Amphay Soulinthone
Malaysia	Philippines	Thailand	Vietnam
Razmah Anam; Siti Norzubaidah Che Ab Wahab; Fisydiana Faradona; Siti Hadinavilla Jumidil; Nor Kamalia Azwa Kamarul Adzhar; Kamisah Khamis	Rhea Mae De La Cruz; Kristine Lapsit; Mary Ann Lopez; Hearth Makiling; Rachelle Palomar; Nieva Jane Salon	Manlika Bunthod; Wiphada Chitphuan; Masaya Duangsri; Somruedee Pruepruk; Ratchaneekorn Saeheang; Ratsamee Thongsod	Hoàng Thị Thu Thảo; Lê Ngọc Tuyết; Nguyễn Thị Mỹ; Nguyễn Thị Ngọc Huyền; Nguyễn Thị Yến; Trần Thị Ngọc Yến

== Results ==
All times are Japan Standard Time (UTC+09:00)

=== Preliminary ===
==== Group A ====
Pos	Team	Pld	W	L	SF	SA	SD	Pts	Qualification
1	Vietnam	3	3	0	6	0	+6	6	Semifinals
2	Thailand	3	2	1	4	2	+2	4	Semifinals
3	Philippines	3	1	2	2	5	−3	2	
4	India	3	0	3	1	6	−5	0	

Source: Aichi-Nagoya 2026

Date	Time		Score		Set 1	Set 2	Set 3
30 Sep	09:00	Vietnam	2–0	India	15–7	15–8	
30 Sep	14:00	Philippines	2–1	India	16–17	15–10	15–12
30 Sep	17:00	Vietnam	2–0	Thailand	17–14	15–12	
1 Oct	09:00	Philippines	0–2	Thailand	7–15	6–15	
1 Oct	14:00	Vietnam	2–0	Philippines	15–11	15–7	
2 Oct	09:00	Thailand	2–0	India	15–10	15–4	

==== Group B ====
Pos	Team	Pld	W	L	SF	SA	SD	Pts	Qualification
1	Indonesia	3	3	0	6	1	+5	6	Semifinals
2	Japan	3	2	1	4	4	0	4	Semifinals
3	Malaysia	3	1	2	4	4	0	2	
4	Laos	3	0	3	1	6	−5	0	

Source: Aichi-Nagoya 2026

Date	Time		Score		Set 1	Set 2	Set 3
30 Sep	10:00	Indonesia	2–0	Laos	15–8	15–8	
30 Sep	15:00	Malaysia	2–0	Laos	17–14	15–8	
30 Sep	17:00	Indonesia	2–0	Japan	15–9	15–12	
1 Oct	10:00	Indonesia	2–1	Malaysia	16–17	15–11	15–12
1 Oct	15:00	Malaysia	1–2	Japan	17–15	9–15	8–15
2 Oct	10:00	Laos	1–2	Japan	9–15	15–11	12–15

=== Knockout round ===
Semifinals
2 October
Vietnam	2
Japan	0
2 October
Thailand	2
Indonesia	0

Gold medal match
3 October
Vietnam	2
Thailand	1

==== Semifinals ====
Date	Time		Score		Set 1	Set 2	Set 3
2 Oct	14:00	Vietnam	2–0	Japan	15–8	15–10	
2 Oct	14:00	Thailand	2–0	Indonesia	15–9	15–4	

==== Gold medal match ====
Date	Time		Score		Set 1	Set 2	Set 3
3 Oct	09:00	Vietnam	2–1	Thailand	15–11	15–17	15–11
