= Toshitaka Naito =

Japanese sepak takraw player

Personal information
- Nationality: Japanese
- Born: 13 March 1994 (age 32) Japan
- Education: Nippon Sport Science University

Sport
- Sport: Sepak takraw
- Event: Quadrant
Medal record
Men's sepak takraw
Representing Japan
Asian Games
Gold medal – first place	2026 Aichi-Nagoya	Men's quadrant
Bronze medal – third place	2026 Aichi-Nagoya	Men's team regu
Silver medal – second place	2018 Jakarta–Palembang	Men's quadrant
Bronze medal – third place	2022 Hangzhou	Men's quadrant
World Championships
Gold medal – first place	2025 Hat Yai	Men's quadrant
Asian Games
Silver medal – second place	2018 Jakarta–Palembang	Men's quadrant

Toshitaka Naito (Japanese: 内藤 利貴; born 13 March 1994) is a Japanese sepak takraw player. He has represented Japan in international competitions, including the Asian Games and the King's Cup World Championships. He competes primarily in the men's quadrant event.

== Career ==
Naito studied at Nippon Sport Science University and represented Japan in international sepak takraw competitions.

At the 2018 Asian Games in Jakarta–Palembang, Naito won the silver medal in the men's quadrant event.

At the 2022 Asian Games in Hangzhou, Naito won the bronze medal in the men's quadrant event.

In 2025, Naito was a member of Japan's men's quadrant team that won the gold medal at the King's Cup World Championships in Hat Yai, Thailand. Japan defeated Vietnam in the final to win the men's quadrant title.

At the 2026 Asian Games in Aichi-Nagoya, Naito was part of Japan's men's quadrant team in the final against Indonesia on 3 October. He was used as a substitute and served as a pinch server during the match. Japan won the first set 17–15, but Indonesia levelled the match by taking the second set 15–9. Japan then won the deciding set 15–13 to take the match 2–1 and win the gold medal. The victory gave Japan its first Asian Games gold medal in sepak takraw.
