= Wushu at the 2026 Asian Games – Women's jianshu & qiangshu =

Women's jianshu & qiangshu at the 2026 Asian Games
- Venue: Aichi Budokan
- Dates: 23 September 2026
- Competitors: 5 from 5 nations

Medalists
gold medal	Yao Yang	China
silver medal	Nanoha Kida	Japan
bronze medal	Dương Thúy Vi	Vietnam

The women's jianshu and qiangshu all-round competition at the 2026 Asian Games was held on 23 September 2026 at Aichi Prefectural Martial Arts Hall in Nagoya, Japan.

== Schedule ==
All times are Japan Standard Time (UTC+09:00)

Date	Time	Event
Wednesday, 23 September 2026	09:41	Jianshu
Wednesday, 23 September 2026	15:11	Qiangshu

== Results ==
Rank	Athlete	Jianshu	Qiangshu	Total
1st place, gold medalist(s)	Yao Yang (CHN)	9.773	9.773	19.546
2nd place, silver medalist(s)	Nanoha Kida (JPN)	9.720	9.726	19.446
3rd place, bronze medalist(s)	Dương Thúy Vi (VIE)	9.703	9.710	19.413
4	Pang Pui Yee (MAS)	9.690	9.700	19.390
5	Patricia Geraldine (INA)	9.703	9.596	19.299
