= Sepak takraw at the 2026 Asian Games – Women's doubles =

Women's doubles at the 2026 Asian Games
- Venue: Paloma Mizuho Arena
- Date: 27–29 September 2026
- Competitors: 24 from 8 nations

Medalists
gold medal	Vietnam
silver medal	Philippines
bronze medal	South Korea
bronze medal	Laos

The women's doubles sepak takraw competition at the 2026 Asian Games is held at Paloma Mizuho Arena, Nagoya, Aichi Prefecture from 27 to 29 September 2026.

Vietnam won the gold medal, Philippines took silver, and South Korea and Laos the bronze medals.

== Squads ==
India	Japan	South Korea	Laos
Leirentonbi Devi Elangbam; Prity Langoljam; Menenu Tsukru	Nagisa Makio; Kayo Togami; Chinatsu Toriumi	Han Ye-ji; Kim Se-young; Lee Min-ju	Sonsavan Keosouliya; Norkham Vongxay; Koy Xayavong
Malaysia	Myanmar	Philippines	Vietnam
Veronica Asli; Nurul Syifa Najwa Mohd Zam Sairon; Nur Athirah Roslan	Cherry Lin Thit; Phoo Phoo; Ya Mong Zin	Nelly Jay Salon; Abegail Sinogbuhan; Jean Marie Sucalit	Lê Thị Hồng Liên; Nguyễn Thị Khánh Ly; Nguyễn Thị Thu Trang

== Results ==
All times are Japan Standard Time (UTC+09:00)

=== Preliminary ===
==== Group A ====
Pos	Team	Pld	W	L	SF	SA	SD	Pts	Qualification
1	Laos	3	3	0	6	1	+5	6	Semifinals
2	Vietnam	3	2	1	5	2	+3	4	Semifinals
3	Malaysia	3	1	2	2	5	−3	2	
4	Myanmar	3	0	3	1	6	−5	0	

Source: Aichi-Nagoya 2026

Date	Time		Score		Set 1	Set 2	Set 3
27 Sep	09:00	Vietnam	1–2	Laos	15–12	10–15	9–15
27 Sep	10:00	Malaysia	2–1	Myanmar	9–15	17–15	15–13
27 Sep	15:00	Vietnam	2–0	Myanmar	15–9	15–13	
27 Sep	16:00	Malaysia	0–2	Laos	12–15	7–15	
28 Sep	09:00	Vietnam	2–0	Malaysia	15–8	15–3	
28 Sep	10:00	Myanmar	0–2	Laos	11–15	12–15	

==== Group B ====
Pos	Team	Pld	W	L	SF	SA	SD	Pts	Qualification
1	South Korea	3	3	0	6	1	+5	6	Semifinals
2	Philippines	3	2	1	5	3	+2	4	Semifinals
3	Japan	3	1	2	3	5	−2	2	
4	India	3	0	3	1	6	−5	0	

Source: Aichi-Nagoya 2026

Date	Time		Score		Set 1	Set 2	Set 3
27 Sep	09:00	South Korea	2–0	India	15–8	15–3	
27 Sep	10:00	Philippines	2–1	Japan	10–15	17–14	15–11
27 Sep	15:00	Philippines	2–0	India	15–12	15–6	
27 Sep	16:00	South Korea	2–0	Japan	15–13	15–7	
28 Sep	09:00	Philippines	1–2	South Korea	15–13	6–15	9–15
28 Sep	10:00	India	1–2	Japan	11–15	15–9	13–15

=== Knockout round ===
Semifinals
28 September
Laos	0
Philippines	2
28 September
Vietnam	2
South Korea	0

Gold medal match
29 September
Philippines	0
Vietnam	2

==== Semifinals ====
Date	Time		Score		Set 1	Set 2	Set 3
28 Sep	14:00	Laos	0–2	Philippines	12–15	10–15	
28 Sep	14:00	Vietnam	2–0	South Korea	15–6	15–13	

==== Gold medal match ====
Date	Time		Score		Set 1	Set 2	Set 3
29 Sep	09:00	Philippines	0–2	Vietnam	8–15	4–15	
