= Sepak takraw at the 2026 Asian Games – Women's team regu =

Women's team regu at the 2026 Asian Games
- Venue: Paloma Mizuho Arena
- Date: 20–25 September 2026
- Competitors: 45 from 4 nations

Medalists
gold medal	Thailand
silver medal	South Korea
bronze medal	Indonesia

The women's team regu sepak takraw competition at the 2026 Asian Games is held at Paloma Mizuho Arena, Nagoya, Aichi Prefecture from 20 to 25 September 2026.

== Squads ==
Thailand	Japan	Indonesia	South Korea
Manlika Bunthod; Wiphada Chitphuan; Masaya Duangsri; Wilaiwan Khodphom; Athikan Kongkaew; Pruksa Maneewong; Somruedee Pruepruk; Kaewjai Pumsawangkaew; Ratchaneekorn Saeheang; Nipaporn Salupphon; Usa Srikhamlue; Ratsamee Thongsod	Shiori Harada; Aoba Taguchi; Patricia Nao Kawlu; Saki Hayashi; Minami Onda; Hinata Shiono; Chinatsu Izawa; Chinatsu Toriumi; Chinatsu Saegusa; Kayo Togami; Nagisa Makio; Yuumi Kiyosawa	Ayvonne Halimatu Zahra Perdhana; Choirunnisa; Dita Pratiwi; Dini Mita Sari; Frisca Kharisma Indrasari; Fujy Anggy Lestari; Kusnelia; Wan Annisa Rachmadi; Yuliana	Bae Chae-eun; Bae Han-oul; Choi Ji-na; Han Ye-ji; Jang Ga-yeon; Jeon Gyu-mi; Kim Ji-young; Kim Se-young; Kim Ye-ji; Lee Min-ju; Park Seon-ju; Wi Ji-seon

== Results ==
All times are Japan Standard Time (UTC+09:00)

=== Preliminary ===
==== Group A ====
Pos	Team	Pld	W	L	MF	MA	MD	Pts	Qualification
1	Thailand	3	3	0	9	0	+9	6	Semifinals (Note: All qualified into semi final due to being only 4 teams.)
2	South Korea	3	2	1	6	3	+3	4	Semifinals
3	Indonesia	3	1	2	3	6	−3	2	Semifinals
4	Japan	3	0	3	0	9	−9	0	Semifinals

Source: Aichi-Nagoya 2026

Date	Time		Score		Regu 1			Regu 2			Regu 3		
Date	Time		Score		Set 1	Set 2	Set 3	Set 1	Set 2	Set 3	Set 1	Set 2	Set 3
20 Sep	14:00	Japan	0–3	Thailand	0–2			0–2			0–2		
20 Sep	14:00	Japan	0–3	Thailand	4–15	6–15		5–15	5–15		5–15	8–15	
20 Sep	14:00	Indonesia	0–3	South Korea	1–2			1–2			1–2		
20 Sep	14:00	Indonesia	0–3	South Korea	11–15	15–12	11–15	8–15	15–10	13-15	17–15	12–15	11-15
21 Sep	14:00	Japan	0–3	South Korea	0–2			0–2			0–2		
21 Sep	14:00	Japan	0–3	South Korea	12–15	13–15		8–15	8–15		5–15	8–15	
22 Sep	14:00	Indonesia	0–3	Thailand	1–2			0–2			0–2		
22 Sep	14:00	Indonesia	0–3	Thailand	10–15	15-13	9-15	9–15	14–17		12–15	12–15	
23 Sep	14:00	Indonesia	3–0	Japan	2–0			2–1			2–0		
23 Sep	14:00	Indonesia	3–0	Japan	15-7	15–9		15–10	10–15	15-9	15-6	15-7	
24 Sep	14:00	South Korea	0–3	Thailand	0–2			0–2			0–2		
24 Sep	14:00	South Korea	0–3	Thailand	8–15	16–17		2–15	6–15		7–15	7–15	

=== Knockout match ===
Semifinals
24 September
Thailand	2
Japan	0
24 September
South Korea	2
Indonesia	0

Gold medal match
25 September
Thailand	2
South Korea	0
Bronze medal match
25 September
Japan	0
Indonesia	2

==== Semifinals ====
Date	Time		Score		Regu 1			Regu 2			Regu 3		
Date	Time		Score		Set 1	Set 2	Set 3	Set 1	Set 2	Set 3	Set 1	Set 2	Set 3
24 Sep	14:00	Thailand	2–0	Japan	2–0			2–0					
24 Sep	14:00	Thailand	2–0	Japan	15–5	15–5		15–4	15–9				
24 Sep	14:00	South Korea	2–0	Indonesia	2–0			2–1					
24 Sep	14:00	South Korea	2–0	Indonesia	15–9	15–11		13–15	15–13	15-11			

==== Bronze medal match ====
Date	Time		Score		Regu 1			Regu 2			Regu 3		
Date	Time		Score		Set 1	Set 2	Set 3	Set 1	Set 2	Set 3	Set 1	Set 2	Set 3
25 Sep	09:00	Japan	0–2	Indonesia	0–2			0–2					
25 Sep	09:00	Japan	0–2	Indonesia	11–15	9–15		5–15	12–15				

==== Gold medal match ====
Date	Time		Score		Regu 1			Regu 2			Regu 3		
Date	Time		Score		Set 1	Set 2	Set 3	Set 1	Set 2	Set 3	Set 1	Set 2	Set 3
25 Sep	09:00	Thailand	2–0	South Korea	2–0			2–0					
25 Sep	09:00	Thailand	2–0	South Korea	15–13	15–5		15–7	15–6				
