= Kim Min-soo =

Kim Min-soo or Kim Min-su may refer to:

- Kim Min-soo (footballer, born 1984), South Korean football player
- Kim Min-soo (judoka) (born 1975), South Korean judoka, mixed martial artist and kickboxer
- Kim Min-soo (singer) (born 1977), Don Spike, South Korean singer and composer
- Kim Min-soo (basketball) (born 1982), South Korean basketball player with the Seoul SK Knights
- Kim Min-su (footballer, born 1997) South Korean football player; see 2020 FC Seoul season
- Kim Min-su (footballer, born 2006), South Korean football player

== See also ==
- Kim Soo-min (born 1994), Miss South Korea 2018
