= Yota Ichikawa =

Japanese sepak takraw player (born 1995)

Personal information
- Native name: 市川 遥太
- Nationality: Japanese
- Born: 11 August 1995 (age 31) Tokyo, Japan
- Education: Toin University of Yokohama
- Height: 170 cm (5 ft 7 in)

Sport
- Sport: Sepak takraw
- Position: Attacker
Medal record
Men's sepak takraw
Representing Japan
Asian Games
Gold medal – first place	2026 Aichi-Nagoya	Men's quadrant
Bronze medal – third place	2026 Aichi-Nagoya	Men's team regu
Bronze medal – third place	2022 Hangzhou	Men's quadrant
World Championships
Gold medal – first place	2025	Men's quadrant

Yota Ichikawa (Japanese: 市川 遥太; born 11 August 1995) is a Japanese sepak takraw player who competes as an attacker. He has represented Japan at the Asian Games and the King's Cup World Championships.

== Career ==
Ichikawa is from Tokyo and attended Komae High School before studying at Toin University of Yokohama. He is an attacker and has been a member of Japan's national sepak takraw team.

Ichikawa competed for Japan at the 2022 Asian Games in Hangzhou, where he won the bronze medal in the men's quadrant event. He was also selected for the men's team regu event.

In 2023, Ichikawa was part of A.K. tippler AFJ's team that won the All Japan Sepaktakraw Open Championship, retaining the title the team had won the previous year.

In 2025, Ichikawa was a member of Japan's men's quadrant team at the King's Cup World Championships. Japan won the men's quadrant title, giving the country its first world championship title in the sport.

In May 2026, Ichikawa, competing for A.K. tippler AFJ with Mizuto Kazuki and Ryutaro Sakamoto, won the men's division at the 33rd All Japan Sepaktakraw Open Championship.

Ichikawa was selected as an A-ranked attacker for Japan's national team for the first half of 2026. He was subsequently selected for Japan's men's quadrant team at the 2026 Asian Games in Aichi-Nagoya.

In the men's quadrant final on 3 October 2026, Japan faced Indonesia. Japan won the first set 17–15, lost the second 9–15, and won the deciding set 15–13. Ichikawa scored several points with his attacks in the deciding set and, at match point with Japan leading 14–13, scored the final point with an attack to give Japan a 2–1 victory. The victory gave Japan its first Asian Games gold medal in sepak takraw.

Ichikawa also won a bronze medal as part of Japan's men's team regu at the 2026 Asian Games.
