= Wushu at the 2026 Asian Games – Men's sanda 60 kg =

Men's sanda 60 kg at the 2026 Asian Games
- Venue: Aichi Budokan
- Dates: 21–24 September 2026
- Competitors: 11 from 11 nations

Medalists
gold medal	Tang Sishuo	China
silver medal	Leung Yu Hong	Hong Kong
bronze medal	Bintang Reindra	Indonesia
bronze medal	Hứa Văn Đoàn	Vietnam

The men's sanda 60 kilograms competition at the 2026 Asian Games in Nagoya, Japan was held from 21 to 24 September 2026 at the Aichi Prefectural Martial Arts Hall.

A total of eleven competitors from eleven countries (NOCs) competed in this event, limited to fighters whose body weight was less than 60 kilograms.

Competition bouts consist of 3 rounds in total, each lasting two minutes with a one-minute rest period between rounds. The athlete who scores more points in each round is the winner of that rounds; the bout ends when one athlete has won two rounds (and thus the match).

Tang Sishuo from China won the gold medal.

== Schedule ==
All times are Japan Standard Time (UTC+09:00)

Date	Time	Event
Monday, 21 September 2026	18:00	1/8 finals
Tuesday, 22 September 2026	18:00	Quarterfinals
Wednesday, 23 September 2026	18:00	Semifinals
Thursday, 24 September 2026	09:30	Final

== Results ==
Legend

- PD — Won by point difference

1/8 finals
Abdulkhamid Odilov (UZB)	0
Mehdi Kermani (IRI)	2
Karim Iminzhanov (KAZ)	0
Hứa Văn Đoàn (VIE)	2
Tang Sishuo (CHN)	PD
Bayadaagiin Mendbayar (MGL)

Quarterfinals
Leung Yu Hong (HKG)	2
Mehdi Kermani (IRI)	0
Baýrammyrat Annamyradow (TKM)
Bintang Reindra (INA)	PD
Kim Min-soo (KOR)	0
Hứa Văn Đoàn (VIE)	2
Tang Sishuo (CHN)	PD
Gideon Fred Padua (PHI)

Semifinals
Leung Yu Hong (HKG)	2
Bintang Reindra (INA)	1
Hứa Văn Đoàn (VIE)
Tang Sishuo (CHN)	PD

Final
Leung Yu Hong (HKG)
Tang Sishuo (CHN)	PD
