= Sepak takraw at the 2026 Asian Games – Men's team regu =

Men's team regu at the 2026 Asian Games
- Venue: Paloma Mizuho Arena
- Date: 20–25 September 2026
- Competitors: 93 from 8 nations

Medalists
gold medal	Malaysia
silver medal	Thailand
bronze medal	Indonesia
bronze medal	Japan

The men's team regu sepak takraw competition at the 2026 Asian Games is held at Paloma Mizuho Arena, Nagoya, Aichi Prefecture from 20 to 25 September 2026.

== Squads ==
Thailand	Laos	Indonesia	South Korea
Wuttinun Kamsanor; Sittipong Khamchan; Kritsanapong Nontakote; Jirasak Pakbuangoen; Pichet Pansan; Marukin Phanmakon; Poottipong Pukdee; Tanaphon Sapyen; Phutawan Sopa; Kritsada Sungvung; Wichan Temkort; Pornthep Tinbangbon	Sengvanh Boulommavong; Soukkaserm Chanthahieng; Phitthasanh Bounpaseuth; Daovy Xanavongxay; Yothin Sombatphouthone; Bigkee Phiengxaiyadeth; Nawin Siriwicha; Anousone Vilavongsa; Noum Souvannady; Daophachanh Moungsin; Adong Phoumisin	Andi Try Sandi Saputra; Gelvin A. Usman; Jelki Ladada; Muh. Hardiansyah Muliang; Muh. Ubaidur Rohman; Rizki Yusuf Djaina; Saiful Rijal; Syamsul Akmal; Yudha Aswinatama	Shin Hee-seop; Kim Hyeong-jong; Cheon Dong-ryung; Lee Min-ju; Kim Jung-man; Seonwoo Young-su; Park Hyeong-eun; Oh Dae-yang; Lee Woo-jin; Jeong Ha-sung; Jeong Won-deok; Lim Tae-gyun
Malaysia	India	Philippines	Japan
Mohd Syahir Mohd Rosdi; Muhd Haziq Hairul Nizam; Muhd Zulkifli Abd Razak; Muhd Zarif Marican; Muhd Hafizul Hayazi; Farhan Adam; Amirul Zazwan Amir; Mohd Azlan Alias; Zuleffendi Sumari; Muhd Afifuddin Mohd Razali; Muhd Shahalril Aiman; Muhd Noraizat Mohd Nordin; Aidil Azman Azwawi	Arun Raju; Bobby Kumar; Lokhon Singh Elangbam; Jasvir Sukhbir Singh; Malemnganba Singh Sorokhaibam; Ashish Chundawat; Ram Kumar Sharma; O Amarjit Singha; Shyam Singh Chundawat; Akash Yumnam; Henary Singh Wahengbam; Ashok Singh Mayengbam	Jason Huerte; Rheyjey Ortouste; Jerry Loquinario Jr.; Jom Lerry Rafael; Ronsited Gabayeron; Rheyjey Ortuoste; Reynaldo Asilum; Glindel Phori; Mark Joseph Gonzales; Vince Alyson Torno; Welmar Aclan; Marc Kian Jake Fuentes; Datu Ken Interino	Ryota Haruhara; Yota Ichikawa; Hirokazu Kobayashi; Ikki Mito; Toshitaka Naito; Wataru Narawa; Masaki Sasamoto; Yuki Sato; Seiya Takano; Shuma Takata; Daishi Tamaki; Shun Yuasa

== Results ==
All times are Japan Standard Time (UTC+09:00)

=== Preliminary ===
==== Group A ====
Pos	Team	Pld	W	L	MF	MA	MD	Pts	Qualification
1	Thailand	3	3	0	9	0	+9	6	Semifinals
2	Indonesia	3	2	1	6	3	+3	4	Semifinals
3	South Korea	3	1	2	2	7	−5	2	
4	Laos	3	0	3	1	8	−7	0	

Source: Aichi-Nagoya 2026

Date	Time		Score		Regu 1			Regu 2			Regu 3		
Date	Time		Score		Set 1	Set 2	Set 3	Set 1	Set 2	Set 3	Set 1	Set 2	Set 3
20 Sep	09:00	Thailand	3–0	South Korea	2–0			2–1			2–0		
20 Sep	09:00	Thailand	3–0	South Korea	15–4	15-12		16–17	15–13	17-15	15-8	15-11	
20 Sep	09:00	Laos	0-3	Indonesia	1–2			0–2			0-2		
20 Sep	09:00	Laos	0-3	Indonesia	15–13	15-17	11-15	10–15	9-15		6-15	15–17	
21 Sep	09:00	Thailand	3–0	Indonesia	2–0			2–0			2–1		
21 Sep	09:00	Thailand	3–0	Indonesia	15–11	15–7		15–9	15–11		15–17	15-10	15-7
22 Sep	09:00	Laos	1-2	South Korea	2–0			0–2			0-2		
22 Sep	09:00	Laos	1-2	South Korea	17–14	15–12		12–15	8–15		10–15	7-15	
23 Sep	09:00	Thailand	3-0	Laos	2–0			2-0			2-0		
23 Sep	09:00	Thailand	3-0	Laos	15–3	15–5		15–9	15–9		15-4	15-4	
23 Sep	09:00	Indonesia	3-0	South Korea	2–1			2-0			2-1		
23 Sep	09:00	Indonesia	3-0	South Korea	15–10	11-15	15-9	15–9	15-12		8-15	15–12	15-13

==== Group B ====
Pos	Team	Pld	W	L	MF	MA	MD	Pts	Qualification
1	Malaysia	3	3	0	9	0	+9	6	Semifinals
2	Japan	3	1	2	3	6	−3	2	Semifinals
3	India	3	1	2	3	6	−3	2	
4	Philippines	3	1	2	3	6	−3	2	

Source: Aichi-Nagoya 2026

Date	Time		Score		Regu 1			Regu 2			Regu 3		
Date	Time		Score		Set 1	Set 2	Set 3	Set 1	Set 2	Set 3	Set 1	Set 2	Set 3
20 Sep	09:00	Malaysia	3–0	Japan	2–0			2–0			2–1		
20 Sep	09:00	Malaysia	3–0	Japan	15–11	15-11		15–6	15–8		13-15	15-5	15-6
21 Sep	09:00	India	1-2	Japan	2-0			1–2			0-2		
21 Sep	09:00	India	1-2	Japan	15–13	15-9		12–15	17–15	11-15	9-15	12–15	
21 Sep	09:00	Malaysia	3–0	Philippines	2–0			2–0			2–0		
21 Sep	09:00	Malaysia	3–0	Philippines	15–2	15–11		15–5	15–7		15–10	15-9	
22 Sep	09:00	Philippines	2-1	Japan	2–0			2-1			0-2		
22 Sep	09:00	Philippines	2-1	Japan	7–15	15–12	15-9	15-12	16-17	15-6	11–15	16-17	
22 Sep	09:00	Malaysia	3-0	India	2–1			2-0			2-0		
22 Sep	09:00	Malaysia	3-0	India	15–13	11–12	15-6	15–9	15–12		15-11	15-5	
23 Sep	09:00	India	2-1	Philippines	2–0			2-1			0-2		
23 Sep	09:00	India	2-1	Philippines	15–7	15-10		15-9	10-15	15-8	15-17	11–15	

=== Knockout match ===
Semifinals
24 September
Thailand	2
Japan	0
24 September
Indonesia	1
Malaysia	2

Gold medal match
25 September
Thailand	0
Malaysia	2

==== Semifinals ====
Date	Time		Score		Regu 1			Regu 2			Regu 3		
Date	Time		Score		Set 1	Set 2	Set 3	Set 1	Set 2	Set 3	Set 1	Set 2	Set 3
24 Sep	09:00	Thailand	2–0	Japan	2–0			2–0					
24 Sep	09:00	Thailand	2–0	Japan	15–9	15–5		15–9	15–10				
24 Sep	09:00	Indonesia	1–2	Malaysia	2–1			0–2			1-2		
24 Sep	09:00	Indonesia	1–2	Malaysia	10–15	15–13	15-13	10–15	6–15		15-11	11-15	11-15

==== Gold medal match ====
Date	Time		Score		Regu 1			Regu 2			Regu 3		
Date	Time		Score		Set 1	Set 2	Set 3	Set 1	Set 2	Set 3	Set 1	Set 2	Set 3
25 Sep	14:00	Thailand	0–2	Malaysia	1-2			0-2					
25 Sep	14:00	Thailand	0–2	Malaysia	9–15	15–5	11-15	13–15	10-15				
