= Kim Soo-min =

Miss Korea 2018 (born 1994)

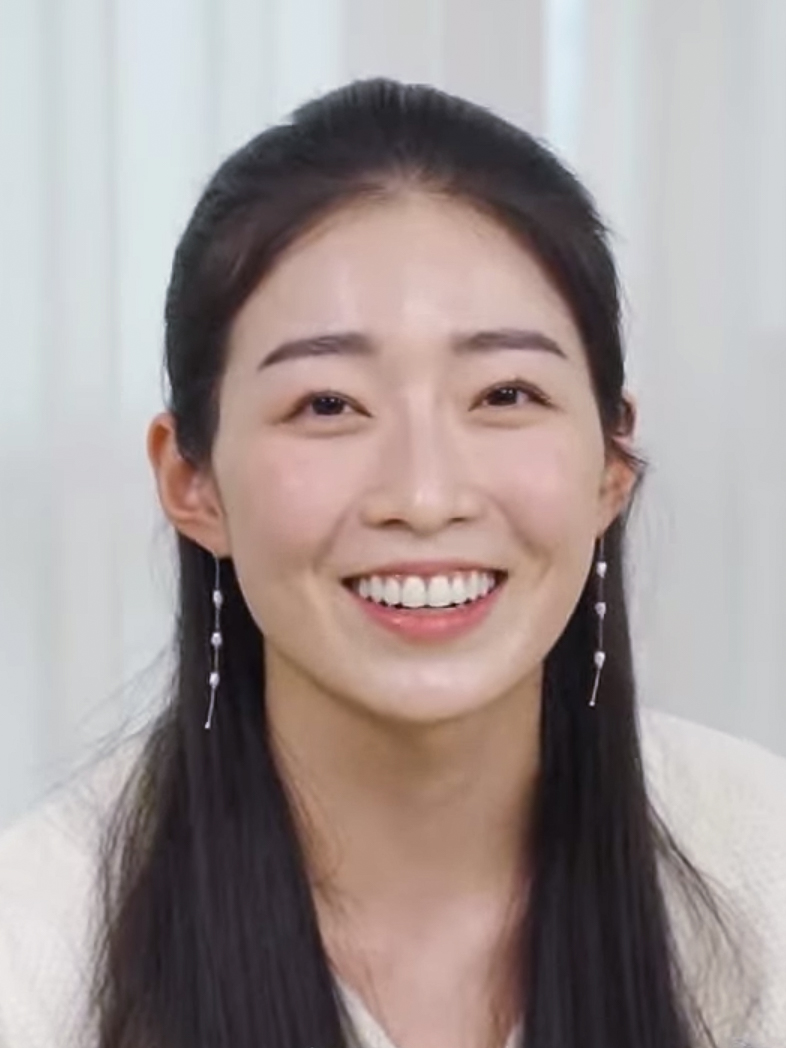
- Kim in 2021
- Born: October 1, 1994 (age 32); South Korea
- Education: Dickinson College (BA)

Kim Soo-min (born October 1, 1994) is a South Korean actress and beauty pageant titleholder who was crowned Miss Korea 2018. She studied at Dickinson College in Carlisle, Pennsylvania, United States, majoring in international business & management and minoring in Chinese. She hopes for a career in international journalism. Her victory and reign have been controversial due to her weight, which some critics have claimed is excessive even though many others would consider it to be low for her height. As Miss Korea, Kim Soo-min worked on setting a healthy standard on stage for better body confidence and regularly spoke out and addressed negative comments surrounding her body online. She created her own YouTube channel at the beginning of 2019.

== Pageantry ==
Kim Soo-min began her pageantry career in college, after applying to the Miss Korea pageant during her senior year.

=== Miss Korea 2018 ===
Kim Soo-min spontaneously applied to the Miss Korea pageant the last semester of her senior year. After deciding to move back to Korea and start her career, she began searching for jobs associated with the news media. During the process, she saw a Miss Korea pageant flyer online and ended up visiting the Miss Korea website and submitting her resume.

=== Public image ===
During interviews and talk shows, Kim Soo-min has discussed controversial issues with Korea's beauty standards and body-shaming culture. She noted that Korean beauty culture has influenced many to believe that any woman, regardless of her height, is overweight when she goes over 50 kilograms. Kim also stated her opinion on how social media perpetuates these standards, stating: “I personally feel like it’s from immensely photo-edited images that we see on our social media,” Kim explained. “We see celebrities showing off their weight, they say ‘I weigh this much’ and they look very pretty. We subconsciously start to think this is the ideal weight and the ideal body. I see a lot of girls who put a lot of effort into losing weight even though they don't have to.”

“I wish me being on stage and onscreen can make young girls think that they’re not fat at all weighing this weight,” Kim shared. “I wish it could also motivate other young girls to be confident in their bodies and accept the way they look. I want to set that healthy standard on stage for better body confidence.”, said Kim.

== Filmography ==
=== Film, television, and web series ===
Year	Film / Show / Web	Role	Notes	Ref.
2019	Happy Together (해피 투게더) Ep.548	Herself	Guest	

== Social media ==
While at college, Kim Soo-min co-ran a foodie blog called FatSoo to introduce diverse food and dishes she found around Carlisle, Pennsylvania. On February 27, 2019, Kim created a YouTube Channel "김수민 sookim" to connect and share more of her personal life with fans.
