= Miyoshi Lake =

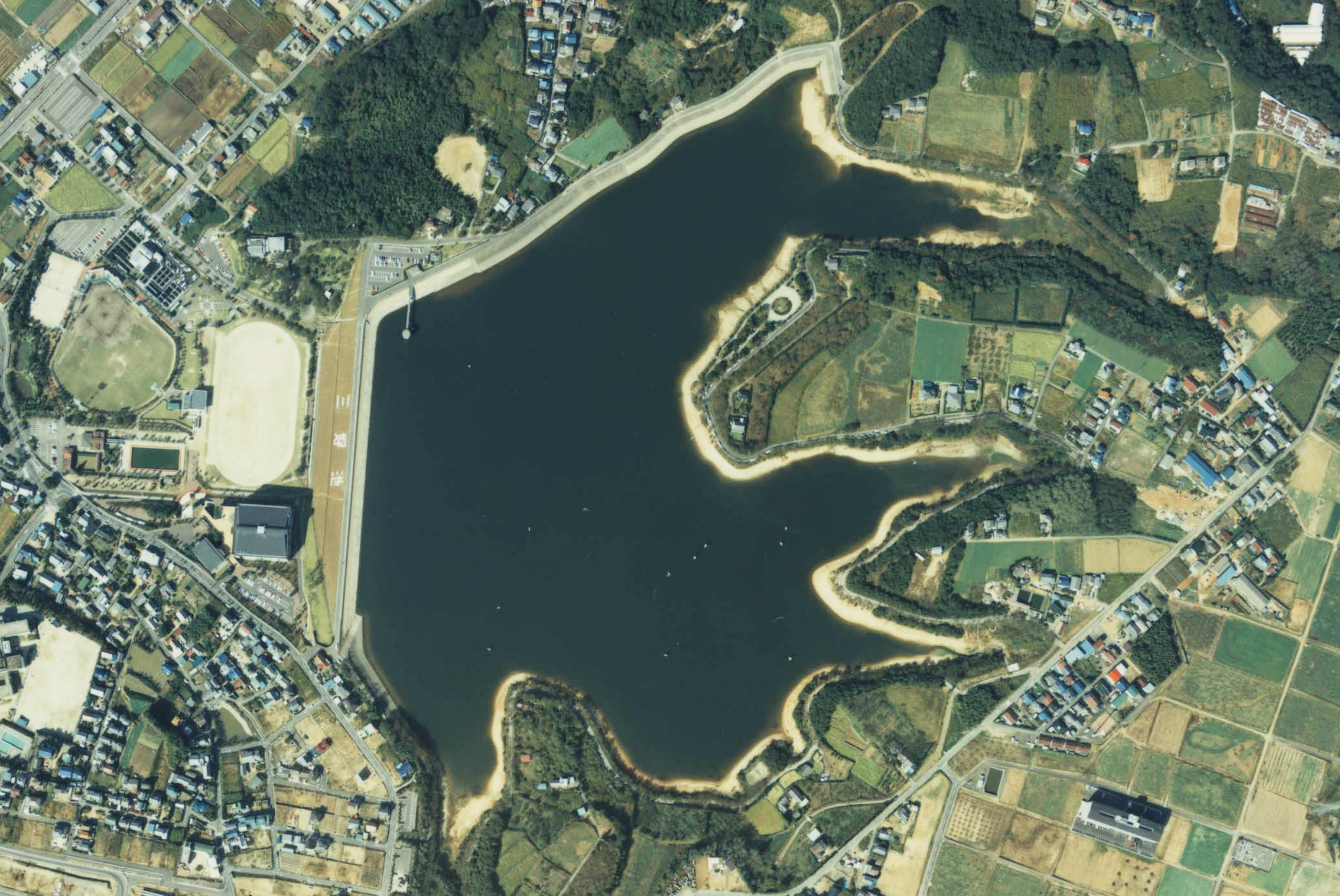
- Aerial photograph of Miyoshi Lake taken in fiscal year 1987
- Interactive map of Miyoshi Lake
- Location: Miyoshi, Aichi, Aichi Prefecture, Japan
- Coordinates: 35°05′32″N 137°05′24″E
- Type: Irrigation reservoir
- Shore length^{1}: 4.5 km (2.8 mi)
- ^{1} Shore length is not a well-defined measure.

Miyoshi Lake (三好池, Miyoshi-ike) is a reservoir and irrigation pond in Miyoshi, Aichi Prefecture, Japan. It has a total storage capacity of approximately 2.235 million cubic metres and an effective storage capacity of approximately 2.2 million cubic metres. In 2010, it was selected by the Ministry of Agriculture, Forestry and Fisheries as one of the 100 Selected Reservoirs of Japan.

== History ==
Miyoshi Lake was constructed around the existing Magari Pond, one of several ponds in the area. Construction began in November 1957 and was completed in January 1959. Improvements to the auxiliary embankment, water intake facilities and spillway were completed in 1981. The reservoir is used for irrigation and industrial water, including the irrigation of approximately 211 hectares of paddy fields.

The development of the lake, together with the Aichi Canal, contributed to the development of agriculture and industry in the Miyoshi area.

== Recreation and canoeing ==
The lake is surrounded by Miyoshi Park and is used for recreational and sporting activities. A canoe racing course was developed at the lake in connection with the 1994 National Sports Festival of Japan, and the venue has subsequently hosted national and international competitions.

The Miyoshi Lake Canoe Course has a permanent 500-metre, nine-lane course. The Miyoshi Lake Canoe Center provides facilities associated with the course. The lake and its surrounding area are also used for walking and jogging.

== Events ==
The lake hosts canoe competitions, including municipal and regional competitions. The Miyoshi City Canoe Association has held canoe sprint competitions at the Miyoshi Lake Canoe Course.

The venue is also scheduled as a competition venue for canoe sprint at the 2026 Asian Games in Aichi-Nagoya.
