= King's Cup Sepaktakraw World Championship =

Sepaw takraw team event

King's Cup Sepak takraw Championship
Competition details
- Discipline: Sepaktakraw
- Organiser: International Sepaktakraw Federation

History
- First edition: 1985 in Bangkok, Thailand
- Editions: 38 (2025)

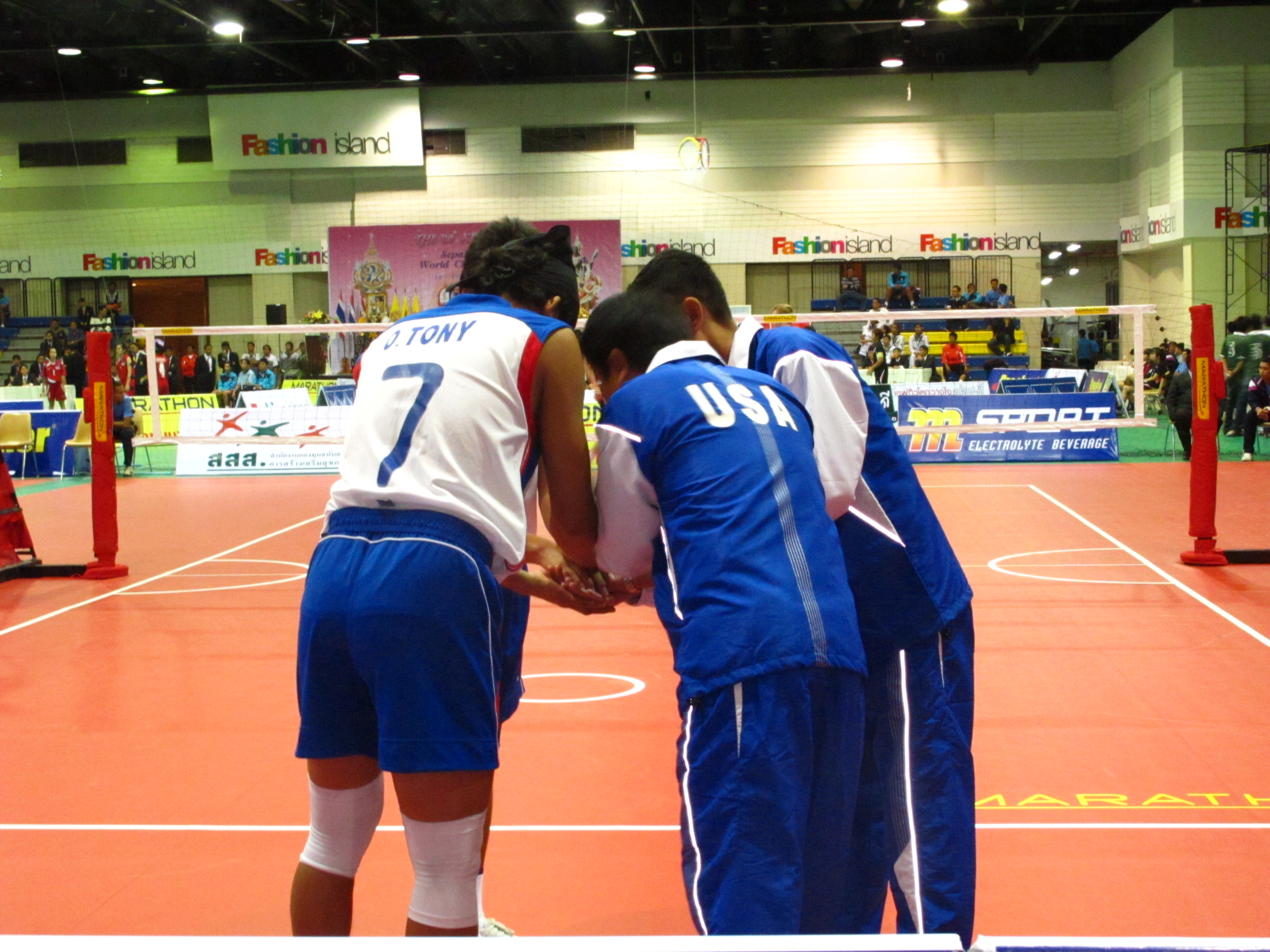
USA Team in King's Cup Championships

The King's Cup Sepak Takraw Championship is a sepak takraw team event which is considered to be the most prestigious tournament in the sport as most top national teams compete in this annual event. The King's Cup is dedicated to His Majesty the King of Thailand. Three regus form a team and winning point is achieved once a team has the majority of two regu victories out of the three regus.

== History ==
In 1985, the first King's Cup tournament was held in Bangkok Thailand where Malaysia emerged as the inaugural champions. Malaysia became champions again in 1988, and the rest of the other editions saw Thailand as champions.

25th King's Cup Sepaktakraw World Championship was held in the 700th Anniversary Stadium from July 27 to August 1, 2010, with 23 competition teams. And 26th King's Cup Sepaktakraw World Championship was held in Fasionisland on 12–17 September 2011 with 23 competition teams in 8 tournaments.

== Editions ==
In 1965, the Asian Sepaktakraw Federation (ASTAF) was formed to govern the sport in Asia (In SEA Games since 1967), then in 1988/1992 the International Sepaktakraw Federation (ISTAF) was formed as the world governing body for the sport.

Men's championship was started in 1992 and for women was in 2005.

No.	Year	Host city	Events
1	1985	Bangkok, Thailand	3
2	1987	Bangkok, Thailand	3
3	1988	Bangkok, Thailand	3
4	1989	Bangkok, Thailand	3
5	1990	Bangkok, Thailand	3
6	1991	Bangkok, Thailand	3
7	1992	Bangkok, Thailand	3
8	1993	Bangkok, Thailand	3
9	1994	Bangkok, Thailand	3
10	1995	Bangkok, Thailand	3
11	1996	Bangkok, Thailand	3
12	1997	Bangkok, Thailand	4
13	1998	Bangkok, Thailand	4
14	1999	Bangkok, Thailand	4
15	2000	Bangkok, Thailand	4
16	2001	Bangkok, Thailand	4
17	2002	Bangkok, Thailand	4
18	2003	Bangkok, Thailand	4
19	2004	Bangkok, Thailand	4
20	2005	Bangkok, Thailand	8
21	2006	Bangkok, Thailand	8
22	2007	Bangkok, Thailand	8
23	2008	Bangkok, Thailand	8
24	2009	Bangkok, Thailand	8
25	2010	Bangkok, Thailand	8
26	2011	Bangkok, Thailand	8
27	2012	Bangkok, Thailand	8
28	2013	Bangkok, Thailand	8
29	2014	Bangkok, Thailand	8
30	2015	Bangkok, Thailand	8
31	2016	Bangkok, Thailand	10
32	2017	Bangkok, Thailand	10
33	2018	Bangkok, Thailand	10
34	2019	Bangkok, Thailand	8
35	2022	Bangkok, Thailand	14
36	2023	Bangkok, Thailand	
37	2024	Bangkok, Thailand	
38	2025	Bangkok, Thailand	

== See also ==
- International Sepaktakraw Federation
- ISTAF SuperSeries
- Sepak takraw at the Asian Games
