= Paloma Mizuho Arena =

Sports venue in Nagoya, Japan

- Paloma Mizuho Arena
- Interactive map of Paloma Mizuho Arena
- Former names: Nagoya City Mizuho Park Gymnasium
- Address: 5-4 Yamashita-dori, Mizuho-ku, Nagoya, Aichi Prefecture, Japan
- Coordinates: 35°07′42.0″N 136°56′42.2″E
- Owner: Nagoya
- Operator: Nagoya City Sports and Education Association
- Capacity: 1,144 + 14 wheelchair spaces (main arena)

Construction
- Opened: 26 June 2021
- General contractors: Sato, Maruhiko Watanabe and Takayanagi Joint Venture

Paloma Mizuho Arena (パロマ瑞穂アリーナ), officially Nagoya City Mizuho Park Gymnasium, is an indoor sports arena in Mizuho-ku, Nagoya, Aichi Prefecture, Japan. It opened on 26 June 2021.

The arena is owned by the City of Nagoya and operated by the Nagoya City Sports and Education Association. The facility is named under a naming-rights agreement with Paloma, a gas appliance manufacturer headquartered in Mizuho-ku.

== History ==
The arena was constructed on the former site of Tanabe Athletic Field, which had served as an auxiliary facility of Mizuho Park's main athletics stadium. Construction began in March 2019 and was completed in March 2021. The facility opened to the public on 26 June 2021.

The arena was constructed as one of the planned competition venues for the 2026 Asian Games, which are being held in Aichi and Nagoya.

== Facilities ==
The building has a site area of 8,800 m^{2} (95,000 sq ft) and a total floor area of 9,490 m^{2} (102,100 sq ft). The building has four above-ground floors.

=== Main arena ===
The main arena has a floor area of 1,620 m^{2} (17,400 sq ft), measuring 45 by 36 metres. It has seating for 1,144 spectators plus 14 wheelchair spaces.

The arena can accommodate a range of sports, including handball, tennis, basketball, volleyball, dodgeball, table tennis, badminton and indiaca.

=== Second arena ===
The second arena has a floor area of 805 m^{2} (8,660 sq ft), measuring 35 by 23 metres, with seating for 100 people. It can accommodate sports including tennis, basketball, volleyball, dodgeball, judo, kendo, karate, naginata, table tennis, badminton and indiaca.

=== Third arena ===
The third arena has a floor area of 510 m^{2} (5,500 sq ft) and seating for 100 people. It is equipped for table tennis, judo, kendo, karate and naginata.

The building also contains three meeting rooms. Its parking area has approximately 100 spaces, shared with other facilities in the surrounding sports complex.

== Naming rights ==
The venue's official municipal name is Nagoya City Mizuho Park Gymnasium. The name Paloma Mizuho Arena is used under a naming-rights agreement with Paloma.
