= Teqball at the 2023 SEA Games =

- Venue: Federation of Youth Hall
- Location: Phnom Penh, Cambodia
- Dates: 6–8 May 2023
- Nations: 7

Teqball was a demonstration sport at the 2023 SEA Games in Cambodia. The tournaments were held at Federation of Youth Hall from 6 to 8 May 2023. FITEQ discussed the inclusion of teqball in the SEA Games back in May 2022 in Hanoi.

== Participating nations ==
Nation	MS	WS	MD	WD	XD
Brunei	Yes	No	Yes	No	No
Cambodia	Yes	Yes	Yes	Yes	Yes
Indonesia	Yes	Yes	Yes	No	No
Malaysia	Yes	Yes	Yes	No	No
Philippines	Yes	No	Yes	No	No
Singapore	Yes	Yes	Yes	No	No
Thailand	No	No	Yes	Yes	Yes

== Medalists ==
Event	Gold	Silver	Bronze
Men's singles	Ream Sokphirom; Cambodia	Yoga Ardika Putra; Indonesia	Al-Barilan Shaul Hameed; Malaysia
Women's singles	Sharifah Nur Amanina Shahab; Singapore	Yunita Indria; Indonesia	Siti Asnidah Zamri; Malaysia
Men's doubles	Thailand; Phakpong Dejaroen; Uthen Kukheaw	Cambodia; Bun Thuonvireak; Ol Ravy	Cambodia; Ream Sokphirom; Soun Ravy
Women's doubles	Thailand; Jutatip Kuntatong; Suphawadi Wongkhamchan	Cambodia; Yem Neardey; Yorn Sophornraksmey	not awarded
Mixed doubles	Thailand; Phakpong Dejaroen; Suphawadi Wongkhamchan	Cambodia; Bun Thuonvireak; Soun Ravy	not awarded

== Medal table ==
* Host nation (Cambodia)

Rank	Nation	Gold	Silver	Bronze	Total
1	Thailand (THA)	3	0	0	3
2	Cambodia (CAM)*	1	3	1	5
3	Singapore (SIN)	1	0	0	1
4	Indonesia (INA)	0	2	0	2
5	Malaysia (MAS)	0	0	2	2
Totals (5 entries)		5	5	3	13
