= 2022 Teqball World Championships =

Tournament information
- Sport: Teqball
- Date: 23–27 November 2022
- Host(s): Germany
- Venue(s): KIA Metropol Arena

The 2022 Teqball World Championships was the 5th edition of the Teqball World Championships. It was held in Nuremberg, Germany from 23 to 27 November 2022. 211 athletes from 55 nations was set to compete in all five categories: men's and women's singles and doubles, and mixed doubles.

== Participating nations ==
- Algeria (ALG)
- Armenia (ARM)
- Austria (AUT)
- Belgium (BEL)
- Brazil (BRA)
- Bulgaria (BUL)
- Canada (CAN)
- Cameroon (CMR)
- Czech Republic (CZE)
- Denmark (DEN)
- France (FRA)
- Germany (GER)
- Hungary (HUN)
- India (IND)
- Italy (ITA)
- Japan (JPN)
- Kosovo (KOS)
- Kuwait (KUW)
- Lebanon (LBN)
- Luxembourg (LUX)
- Moldova (MLD)
- Montenegro (MNE)
- North Macedonia (MKD)
- Norway (NOR)
- Portugal (POR)
- Romania (ROU)
- Spain (ESP)
- Senegal (SEN)
- Serbia (SRB)
- Thailand (THA)
- Tunisia (TUN)
- Ukraine (UKR)
- United States (USA)

== Medal summary ==
Event	Gold	Silver	Bronze
Men's singles	Apor Györgydeák (ROU)	Adrian Duszak (POL)	Ádám Blázsovics (HUN)
Women's singles	Carolyn Greco (USA)	Anna Izsák (HUN)	Rafaella Fontes (BRA)
Men's doubles	Nikola Mitro (SRB); Bogdan Marojević (SRB)	Ádám Bakó (HUN); Ádám Blázsovics (HUN)	Apor Györgydeák (ROU); Ilyés Szabolcs (ROU)
Women's doubles	Zsanett Janicsek (HUN); Lea Vasas (HUN)	Carolyn Greco (USA); Margaret Osmundson (USA)	Rafaella Fontes (BRA); Natalia Guitler (BRA)
Mixed doubles	Ádám Bakó (HUN); Lea Vasas (HUN)	Leonardo Lindoso (BRA); Vania Moraes (BRA)	Adrian Duszak (POL); Alicja Bartnicka (POL)

=== Men's doubles ===
Round of 32
A1	Nikola MITRO (SRB); Bogdan MAROJEVIC (SRB)
D2	BYE; BYE
C1	Stoycho ZHEKOV (BUL); Dian GEORGIEV (BUL)	8	11
D1	Lionel BEYER (FRA); Cedric JAEGY (FRA)	12	12
E1	Brian Mengel THOMSEN (DEN); Mathias Landen JEP (DEN)	12	12
F1	J.HOFMANN-WELLENHOF (AUT); Sascha WEGSCHEI (AUT)	4	2
G1	Declan GONSALVES (IND); Anas BEG (IND)	6	9
H1	Ahmad ARABI (LBN); Mohamad HAFEZ (LBN)	12	12
I1
J1
K1	10	15
L1
M1
N1

Round of 16
A1
C1
E1
H1
J1	'
L1
N1
P1

Quarter-finals
C1
E1	21	21
J1
N1

Semi-finals
E1
N1

Gold medal match
Bronze medal match
C1
J1

== Medal table ==
* Host nation (Germany)

Rank	Nation	Gold	Silver	Bronze	Total
1	Hungary	2	2	1	5
2	United States	1	1	0	2
3	Romania	1	0	1	2
4	Serbia	1	0	0	1
5	Brazil	0	1	2	3
6	Poland	0	1	1	2
Totals (6 entries)		5	5	5	15
