= Nigeria Teqball Federation =

The Nigeria Teqball Federation (NIGTEQ) is the governing body for the sport of teqball in Nigeria. It is responsible for the organisation, development, and regulation of teqball activities in the country.

== History ==
The federation was established in 2019 and was officially recognised by the International Teqball Federation (FITEQ) in 2020.

== Competitions ==
The Nigeria Teqball Federation recently hosted its inaugural National Teqball League, tagged “ABA 2026'' with participation from 18 states across the country. The competition marked the first structured national event for the sport in Nigeria. At the international level, Nigerian athletes representing the federation won gold at the 2023 African Beach Games held in Hammamet, Tunisia, in the mixed doubles teqball event. The gold was claimed by the pairing of Samson Funsho-Funto and Rashidat Salau, who became the first Nigerian teqball players to win gold at any international tournament.

Abia State emerged as the overall winner. In individual categories, Kahleed Yahaya and Funsho Sampson led Team Abia to victory in the Men’s Singles and Men’s Doubles respectively, while Musa Joshua and Gladys Abasi (Team Rivers) won the Women’s Singles and Mixed Doubles. Team Delta finished top in the Women’s Doubles category.

== Board ==
The board is chaired by the Nigeria Olympic Committee President and a member of the International Olympic Committee, Habu Gumel. Other Board members includes Ndudi Edede, currently the Vice President and who first served as the General Secretary of the Federation
