= Teqball World Championships =

International tournament

Tournament information
- Sport: Teqball
- Established: 2017

Current champion
- Men's singles (Romania) Apor Györgydeák; Women's singles (Thailand) Jutatip Kuntatong; Men's doubles (Serbia) Bogdan Marojević / Nikola Mitro; Women's doubles (Thailand) Jutatip Kuntatong / Suphawadi Wongkhamchan; Mixed doubles (Romania) Apor Györgydeák / Kinga Barabasi

The Teqball World Championships, formerly the Teqball World Cup, is an international teqball tournament sanctioned by the International Teqball Federation (FITEQ).

== History ==
The Teqball World Championships was first organized as the Teqball World Cup. The inaugural edition was held in Hungary in July 2017. This was followed by a tournament in Reims, France, the following year. In 2019, the tournament, now under its current name, returned to Hungary.

In 2020, the World Championship was not held due to the COVID-19 pandemic. The annual competition would be held again from 2021.

== Editions ==
Edition	Year	Host city	Events	Top Nation
1	2017	Budapest, Hungary	2	Hungary
2	2018	Reims, France	2	Romania
3	2019	Budapest, Hungary	3	Hungary
4	2021	Gliwice, Poland	5	Hungary
5	2022	Nuremberg, Germany	5	Hungary
6	2023	Bangkok, Thailand	5	Thailand
7	2024	Ho Chi Minh City, Vietnam	5	Thailand
8	2025	Odorheiu Secuiesc, Romania	5	Thailand

== Results ==
=== Men's singles ===
Year	Location	Final			Third place playoff or losing semi-finalists			Source
Year	Location	Champion	Result	Runner-up	Third place	Result	Fourth place	Source
2017	(Hungary) Budapest	Ádám Blázsovics; Hungary	12–8, 12–9	Máté Szolga; Hungary	Zsolt Lázár; Romania	12–9, 12–5	Konstatinos Becas; Greece	
2018	(France) Reims	Barna Szécsi; Romania	20–11, 20–15	Árpád Sipos; Hungary	Adrian Duszak; Poland	20–12, 20–10	Bogdan Marojević; Montenegro	
2019	(Hungary) Budapest	Ádám Blázsovics; Hungary	20–10, 20–9	Adrian Duszak; Poland	Apor Györgydeák; Romania	19–20, 20–5, 20–16	Bogdan Marojević; Montenegro	
2021	(Poland) Gliwice	Ádám Blázsovics; Hungary	12–6, 10–12, 12–6	Julien Grondin; France	Adrian Duszak; Poland	9–12, 12–10, 12–10	Apor Györgydeák; Romania	
2022	(Germany) Nuremberg	Apor Györgydeák; Romania	12–8, 12–6	Adrian Duszak; Poland	Ádám Blázsovics; Hungary	12–11, 12–6	Luka Pilić; United States	
2023	(Thailand) Bangkok	Adrian Duszak; Poland	12–10, 12–9	Apor Györgydeák; Romania	Hugo Rabeux; France	12–6, 12–3	Brian Mengel Thomsen; Denmark	
2024	(Vietnam) Ho Chi Minh City	Apor Györgydeák; Romania	12–4, 12–2	Nikola Mitro; Serbia	Boonkoom Tipwong (Thailand); Adrian Duszak (Poland)			
2025	(Romania) Odorheiu Secuiesc	Apor Györgydeák; Romania	12–3, 12–10	Nikola Mitro; Serbia	Uthen Kukheaw (Thailand); Milan Csabi (Hungary)			

=== Women's singles ===
Year	Location	Final			Third place playoff or losing semi-finalists			Source
Year	Location	Champions	Result	Runners-up	Third place	Result	Fourth place	Source
2021	(Poland) Gliwice	Anna Izsák; Hungary	12–8, 12–7	Paulina Łeżak; Poland	Carolyn Greco; United States	12–5, 12–2	Natalia Guitler; Brazil	
2022	(Germany) Nuremberg	Carolyn Greco; United States	12–4, 12–11	Anna Izsák; Hungary	Rafaella Fontes; Brazil	12–6, 12–6	Amélie Julian; France	
2023	(Thailand) Bangkok	Rafaella Fontes; Brazil	12–8,12–10	Jutatip Kuntatong; Thailand	Kinga Barabasi; Romania	12–11, 12–5	Carolyn Greco; United States	
2024	(Vietnam) Ho Chi Minh City	Jutatip Kuntatong; Thailand	10–12, 12–10, 12-9	Rafaella Fontes; Brazil	Kinga Barabasi (Romania); Paulina Łeżak (Poland)			
2025	(Romania) Odorheiu Secuiesc	Jutatip Kuntatong; Thailand	12-8, 10-12, 12-3	Kinga Barabasi; Romania	Anna Izsak (Hungary); Yuina Sakamoto (Japan)			

=== Men's doubles ===
Year	Location	Final			Third place playoff or losing semi-finalists			Source
Year	Location	Champions	Result	Runners-up	Third place	Result	Fourth place	Source
2017	(Hungary) Budapest	Romania; Zsolt Lázár; Barna Szécsi	12–10, 9–12, 12–9	Hungary; Balázs Imreh; Róbert Szepessy	Serbia; Milan Lukić; Saša Mirosavljević	12–9, 12–5	France; Romain Gesmier; Jonathan Siad	
2018	(France) Reims	Montenegro; Bogdan Marojević; Nikola Mitro	19–20, 20–15, 22–20	Hungary; Csaba Bányik; Ádám Blázsovics	Romania; Szabolcs Ilyés; Zsolt Lázár	20–11, 20–11	Brazil; Natalia Guitler; Marcos Vieira da Silva	
2019	(Hungary) Budapest	Hungary; Csaba Bányik; Ádám Blázsovics	20–9, 20–18	Montenegro; Bogdan Marojević; Nikola Mitro	Romania; Szabolcs Ilyés; Zsolt Lázár	20–13, 20–19	France; Julien Grondin; Hugo Rabeux	
2021	(Poland) Gliwice	Serbia; Bogdan Marojević; Nikola Mitro	12–7, 9–12, 12–3	Romania; Apor Györgydeák; Szabolcs Ilyés	Hungary; Csaba Bányik; Ádám Blázsovics	12–9, 12–10	Brazil; Rodrigo Bento Medeiros; Matheus Ferraz	
2022	(Germany) Nuremberg	Serbia; Bogdan Marojević; Nikola Mitro	12–9, 11–12, 14–12	Hungary; Ádám Bakó; Ádám Blázsovics	Romania; Apor Györgydeák; Szabolcs Ilyés	12–11, 12–10	Brazil; Rodrigo Bento Medeiros; Matheus Ferraz	
2023	(Thailand) Bangkok	Hungary; Csaba Bányik; Balázs Katz	12–4,12–7	Brazil; Rodrigo Bento Medeiros; Matheus Ferraz	Thailand; Phakpong Dejaroen; Boonkoom Tipwong	12–10, 7–12, 12–8	Serbia; Bogdan Marojević; Nikola Mitro	
2024	(Vietnam) Ho Chi Minh City	Thailand; Sorrasak Thaosiri; Jirati Chanliang	12–10,9–12,12–9	Poland; Adrian Duszak; Marek Pokwap	Declan Gonsalves / Anas Beg (India); Csaba Bányik / Balázs Katz (Hungary)			
2025	(Romania) Odorheiu Secuiesc	Serbia; Bogdan Marojević; Nikola Mitro	12–7, 12-3	Thailand; Sorrasak Thaosiri; Jirati Chanliang	Rodrigo Bento Medeiros/Matheus Ferraz (Brazil); Csaba Bányik / Balázs Katz (Hungary)			

=== Women's doubles ===
Year	Location	Final			Third place playoff or losing semi-finalists			Source
Year	Location	Champions	Result	Runners-up	Third place	Result	Fourth place	Source
2021	(Poland) Gliwice	Brazil; Natalia Guitler; Rafaella Fontes	12–3, 6–12, 12–9	United States; Carolyn Greco; Margaret Osmundson	Romania; Kinga Barabási; Katalin Dakó	12–10, 11–12, 12–7	Hungary; Anna Izsák; Lea Vasas	
2022	(Germany) Nuremberg	Hungary; Zsanett Janicsek; Lea Vasas	11–12, 12–7, 12–6	United States; Carolyn Greco; Margaret Osmundson	Brazil; Natalia Guitler; Rafaella Fontes	12–7, 11–12, 12–7	Romania; Kinga Barabási; Katalin Dakó	
2023	(Thailand) Bangkok	Thailand; Suphawadi Wongkhamchan; Jutatip Kuntatong	12–8,12–6	Hungary; Petra Pechy; Nora Vicsek	Brazil; Ester Viana Mendes; Vania Moraes Da Cruz	12–11, 12–5	United States; Carolyn Greco; Kimberly Baker	
2024	(Vietnam) Ho Chi Minh City	Thailand; Jutatip Kuntatong; Suphawadi Wongkhamchan	12–9, 12–9	Hungary; Petra Pechy; Krisztina Acs	Nanna Lind Kristensen / Mira Fænø Dahlmann (Denmark); Vania Moraes Da Cruz / Ester Viana Mendes (Brazil)			
2025	(Romania) Odorheiu Secuiesc	Thailand; Jutatip Kuntatong; Suphawadi Wongkhamchan	12–9, 8-12, 12-6	Hungary; Petra Pechy; Nora Vicsek	Maria Chedid/Kamar Dandal (Lebanon); Vania Moraes Da Cruz / Ester Viana Mendes (Brazil)			

=== Mixed doubles ===
Year	Location	Final			Third place playoff or losing semi-finalists			Source
Year	Location	Champions	Result	Runners-up	Third place	Result	Fourth place	Source
2019	(Hungary) Budapest	Brazil; Natalia Guitler; Marcos Vieira da Silva	20–15, 19–20, 20–14	Hungary; Zsanett Janicsek; Csaba Bányik	Montenegro; Maja Umićević; Nikola Mitro	20–13, 20–14	Romania; Mitri Rita; Zsolt Lázár	
2021	(Poland) Gliwice	Hungary; Zsanett Janicsek; Csaba Bányik	12–10, 12–9	Brazil; Vania Moraes da Cruz; Leonardo Lindoso De Almeida	Romania; Tünde Miklós; Apor Györgydeák	12–10, 11–12, 12–7	United States; Margaret Osmundson; Luka Pilic	
2022	(Germany) Nuremberg	Hungary; Ádám Bakó; Lea Vasas	12–6, 12–11	Brazil; Leonardo Lindoso De Almeida; Vania Moraes da Cruz	Poland; Adrian Duszak; Alicja Bartnicka	12–4, 12–9	Serbia; Nikola Mitro; Maja Umićević	
2023	(Thailand) Bangkok	Thailand; Phakpong Dejaroen; Suphawadi Wongkhamchan	12–4, 12–9	Brazil; Leonardo Lindoso De Almeida; Vania Moraes da Cruz	Hungary; Csaba Bányik; Krisztina Acs	12–5, 8–12, 12–2	Poland; Marek Pokwap; Alicja Bartnicka	
2024	(Vietnam) Ho Chi Minh City	Thailand; Suphawadi Wongkhamchan; Phakpong Dejaroen	10–12, 12–4, 12–10	Hungary; Balázs Katz; Krisztina Acs	Kinga Barabasi / Apor Györgydeák (Romania); Amelie Julian / Hugo Rabeux (France)			
2025	(Romania) Odorheiu Secuiesc	Romania; Apor Györgydeák; Kinga Barabasi	12–2, 12-10	Thailand; Suphawadi Wongkhamchan; Phakpong Dejaroen	Petra Pechi / Adam Blazsovics (Hungary); Leonardo Lindoso De Almeida / Vania Moraes da Cruz (Brazil)			

== Medal table ==
Rank	Nation	Gold	Silver	Bronze	Total
1	Hungary	9	11	8	28
2	Thailand	8	3	3	14
3	Romania	6	3	10	19
4	Brazil	3	5	7	15
5	Serbia	3	2	1	6
6	Poland	1	4	5	10
7	United States	1	2	1	4
8	Montenegro	1	1	1	3
9	France	0	1	2	3
10	Denmark	0	0	1	1
10	India	0	0	1	1
10	Japan	0	0	1	1
10	Lebanon	0	0	1	1
Totals (13 entries)		32	32	42	106

== Multiple medalists ==
Top medalists ordered by number of gold medals at the Teqball World Championships are listed below. 11 men and 8 women won at least one gold medal.

=== Men ===
Rank	Player	Country	From	To	Gold	Silver	Bronze	Total
1	Apor Györgydeák	Romania	2019	2025	4	2	4	10
2	Ádám Blázsovics	Hungary	2017	2025	4	2	3	9
3	Nikola Mitro	Montenegro; Serbia	2018	2025	4	3	1	8
4	Bogdan Marojević	Montenegro; Serbia	2018	2025	4	1	0	5
5	Csaba Bányik	Hungary	2018	2025	3	2	4	9
6	Phakpong Dejaroen	Thailand	2023	2025	2	1	1	4
7	Barna Szécsi	Romania	2017	2018	2	0	0	2
8	Adrian Duszak	Poland	2018	2024	1	3	4	8
9	Balázs Katz	Hungary	2023	2025	1	1	2	4
10	Ádám Bakó	Hungary	2022	2022	1	1	0	2
10	Sorrasak Thaosiri	Thailand	2024	2025	1	1	0	2
10	Jirati Chanliang	Thailand	2024	2025	1	1	0	2
13	Zsolt Lázár	Romania	2017	2019	1	0	3	4

=== Women ===
Rank	Player	Country	From	To	Gold	Silver	Bronze	Total
1	Jutatip Kuntatong	Thailand	2023	2025	5	1	0	6
1	Suphawadi Wongkhamchan	Thailand	2023	2025	5	1	0	6
3	Rafaella Fontes	Brazil	2021	2025	2	1	3	6
4	Zsanett Janicsek	Hungary	2019	2022	2	1	0	3
5	Natalia Guitler	Brazil	2019	2022	2	0	1	3
6	Lea Vasas	Hungary	2022	2022	2	0	0	2
7	Carolyn Greco	United States	2021	2022	1	2	1	4
8	Kinga Barabasi	Romania	2021	2025	1	1	4	6
9	Anna Izsák	Hungary	2021	2022	1	1	0	2

== Participating nations ==
The following nations have taken part in the Teqball World Championships.

Nation	2017	2018	2019	2021	2022	Years
Afghanistan			X			1
Albania		X				1
Algeria		X	X	X	X	4
Argentina			X			1
Armenia					X	1
Aruba		X	X			2
Austria					X	1
Bahrain			X			1
Belarus			X			1
Belgium		X	X	X	X	4
Brazil	X	X	X	X	X	5
Bulgaria			X	X	X	3
Canada			X		X	1
Cameroon		X	X	X	X	4
Cape Verde			X			1
China		X	X			2
Cook Islands			X			1
Czech Republic		X	X	X	X	4
Denmark				X	X	2
Djibouti			X			1
Egypt			X			1
England		X	X			2
Finland		X				1
France	X	X	X	X	X	5
Germany		X	X		X	3
Ghana			X			1
Greece	X	X				2
Guinea-Bissau			X			1
Hungary	X	X	X	X	X	5
India			X		X	2
Ireland		X	X			2
Israel		X	X			2
Italy		X	X		X	3
Ivory Coast			X			1
Jamaica			X			1
Japan	X	X	X		X	4
Jordan			X			1
Kazakhstan			X			1
Kosovo				X	X	2
Kuwait		X	X		X	3
Lebanon		X		X	X	3
Luxembourg	X	X			X	3
Madagascar			X			1
Malaysia		X	X			2
Malta		X				1
Mexico		X	X			2
Moldova				X	X	2
Morocco		X	X			2
Monaco		X				1
Montenegro		X	X		X	3
Netherlands		X				1
New Caledonia		X	X			2
Nigeria			X			1
Northern Ireland		X				1
North Macedonia			X		X	2
Norway			X	X	X	3
Pakistan		X	X			2
Panama			X			1
Poland	X	X	X	X	X	5
Portugal	X	X	X	X	X	5
Romania	X	X	X	X	X	5
Russia		X	X			2
RTA				X		1
Scotland		X	X			2
Slovakia			X			1
Spain	X	X	X	X	X	5
Sweden		X				1
Senegal			X	X	X	3
Serbia	X	X	X	X	X	5
Thailand					X	1
Togo			X			1
Tunisia		X	X	X	X	4
Ukraine		X	X	X	X	4
United States			X	X	X	3
Wales		X	X			2

== See also ==
- European Teqball Championships
- European Youth Teqball Championships (U19)
