= Teqball at the 2025 SEA Games =

- Venue: SEA Games Gymnasium, Chonburi Sports School
- Location: Mueang Chonburi, Chonburi , Thailand
- Dates: 10–13 December 2025

Teqball competitions at the 2025 SEA Games took place at SEA Games Gymnasium, Chonburi Sports School in Mueang Chonburi, Chonburi, Thailand, from 10 to 13 December 2025.

== Medal table ==
* Host nation (Thailand)

Rank	Nation	Gold	Silver	Bronze	Total
1	Thailand*	5	0	0	5
2	Indonesia	0	3	2	5
3	Myanmar	0	2	2	4
4	Malaysia	0	0	5	5
5	Vietnam	0	0	1	1
Totals (5 entries)		5	5	10	20

== Medalists ==
Event	Gold	Silver	Bronze
Men's singles	Thailand; Uthen Kukheaw	Indonesia; Yoga Ardika Putra	Myanmar; Saw Friday
Men's singles	Thailand; Uthen Kukheaw	Indonesia; Yoga Ardika Putra	Malaysia; Azmilaan Shahul Hameed
Men's doubles	Thailand; Sorrasak Thaosiri; Jirati Chanliang	Indonesia; La Ode Mardan; Husni Uba	Vietnam; Lê Anh Khoa; Giang Bá Trường
Men's doubles	Thailand; Sorrasak Thaosiri; Jirati Chanliang	Indonesia; La Ode Mardan; Husni Uba	Malaysia; Muhammad Faris Farizal Zukeri; Muhammad Eizlan Rakhli Abd Rahman
Women's singles	Thailand; Jutatip Kuntatong	Indonesia; Zikhra Dwi Putri	Myanmar; Hsu Mon Aung
Women's singles	Thailand; Jutatip Kuntatong	Indonesia; Zikhra Dwi Putri	Malaysia; Nur Natasha Amyra Fazil
Women's doubles	Thailand; Jutatip Kuntatong; Suphawadi Wongkhamchan	Myanmar; Aung Hsu Mon; Win Naing Naing	Indonesia; Akyko Micheel Kapito; Gabriella Jessica Pongbura
Women's doubles	Thailand; Jutatip Kuntatong; Suphawadi Wongkhamchan	Myanmar; Aung Hsu Mon; Win Naing Naing	Malaysia; Nur Natasha Amyra Fazil; Nur Batrisyia Afrina Iskandar
Mixed doubles	Thailand; Phakpong Dejaroen; Suphawadi Wongkhamchan	Myanmar; Lwin Ko Ko; Win Naing Naing	Indonesia; Muhammad Azwar; Sumaya
Mixed doubles	Thailand; Phakpong Dejaroen; Suphawadi Wongkhamchan	Myanmar; Lwin Ko Ko; Win Naing Naing	Malaysia; Nurul Syafiqah Jafri; Nur Hidayat Ar Rasyid Ahmad Daud
