= Solution Movement =

Solution Movement Megoldás Mozgalom
- Abbreviation: MEMO
- President: Dániel Bogó
- Vice presidents: Krisztina Bajusz; Gábor Borsányi; Viktor Huszár
- Program board chairman: Péter Szatmári
- Founder: György Gattyán
- Founded: 17 December 2021
- Registered: 24 December 2021
- Ideology: Digitalization; Pro-Europeanism
- Political position: Center to Center-right
- Colours: Red; White
- Slogan: «Trusting in each other» (Hungarian: «Bízva Egymásban»)
- National Assembly: 0 / 199
- European Parliament: 0 / 21
- County Assemblies: 0 / 381
- General Assembly of Budapest: 0 / 33

Website
- memo.hu

The Solution Movement (Hungarian: Megoldás Mozgalom, pronounced [ˈmɛɡoldaːʃ ˈmozɡɒlom]; MEMO) is a political party founded in 2021 led by entrepreneur György Gattyán. The party was formed for the 2022 Hungarian parliamentary election, in which it did not win any seats.

== History ==
György Gattyán's first public appearance since 2013 was a 2021 interview with Gabriella Jakupcsek, in which he testified about his political ambitions. After that, he hinted in Sándor Friderikusz' podcast that he was starting a party. He officially announced on 17 December 2021 in ATV that he is creating a party called Megoldás Mozgalom with which he intends to run in the 2022 elections and that he is nominating candidates in all 106 electoral districts.

The party was registered on December 24, 2021; candidates were searched for in job advertisements.

== Program ==
The Megoldás Mozgalom program was initially not open to the public, the program points were uploaded in the form of small cards to their website and various social media platforms. These include, among other things, the introduction of the concept of an economic public actor, the maximization of the tenure of the position of prime minister and the transformation of the TAO corporate tax system.

Their program, which was later made public, treated as a top priority the creation of a "guarantee system" for Hungary to move into the 21st century, by creating and operating a state-of-the-art economic, social and welfare framework.

== Criticism ==
In public life, the establishment of the Solution Movement provoked sharp debates.

After the announcement of the founding of the party, the opposition political alliance United for Hungary immediately accused the Gattyáns of electoral collusion with Fidesz, stating that if the party's goal had really been a change of government, it should have fielded its candidates in the 2021 opposition primary. The opposition has also criticized that Gattyán's party is actually a sham party whose aim is to confuse opposition voters and divide their votes, thereby helping Fidesz-KDNP in the election.

Complicity with the governing parties was also believed to be seen in the fact that in March 2020, the Central Investigative Department of the National Crime Directorate of the National Investigation Agency (NAV) seized the building owned by Gattyán at Andrássy út for a value of HUF 14 billion 187 million. The seizure was lifted on December 7, 2021 by the NAV, and this happened immediately after Gattyán announced his political involvement. The parties of the opposition coalition also saw their accusations confirmed in the NAV decision favorable to Gattyán.

In his interviews, the party chairman repeatedly denied that he had a relationship with the governing parties.

The prominent role played by its leader, György Gattyán, in the international sex industry was a recurring criticism of the movement. Gattyán was listed as the sixth richest person in Hungary on the Forbes Hungary list published in 2022; his fortune, estimated at HUF 253.8 billion, was largely derived from the income of his erotic sex cam service called LiveJasmin.

== Leadership ==
- György Gattyán (president), ranked 6th on the Forbes 50 list in 2021 with a fortune of HUF 245.6 billion
- Dr. Péter Szatmári (Chairman of the Program Board)
- Dr. Krisztina Bajusz (Vice President for social and social affairs)
- Gábor Borsányi (Vice President for sports and;leisure)
- Viktor Huszár (Vice President for digitization)

== Election results ==
=== National Assembly ===
Election	Leader	Constituency		Party list		Seats	+/–	Status
Election	Leader	Votes	%	Votes	%	Seats	+/–	Status
2022	György Gattyán	64,341	1.20 (#5)	58,929	1.04 (#5)	0 / 199	New	Extra-parliamentary
2026	György Gattyán	Did not contest						

=== European Parliament ===
Election	List leader	Votes	%	Seats	+/−	EP Group
2024	Viktor Huszár	16,806	0.37 (#11)	0 / 21	New	−

=== Local Elections ===
After the 2024 Local Elections the party's mayoral candidates won in three settlements: Peter Mayer in Mátraballa (51%), Dr. Dienes Csilla Biróné in Szamossályi (sole candidate, 100%) and Zoltán Mali in Drávapiski (68%), in the case of the later one all seats of the four-member local council was won by MEMO. According to the data of the Hungarian Central Statistical Office none of the three settlements had a population of more than 1000. Drávapiski had only 99 registered residents at the time of the election.

== Aftermath ==
The founder of the party did not expect a simple, but a qualitative, two-thirds victory in the parliamentary elections. Compared to this, MEMO's success in the national voting was finally achieved by obtaining 58,929 votes and a result of over 1 percent (1.04%). With this, Gattyán achieved that his party did not have to repay the money received for their campaign to the state. In addition until 2026, they became entitled to 50-60 million forints per year in party funding.
