= Jutatip Kuntatong =

Thai teqball player (born 1997)

Personal information
- Native name: จุฑาทิพย์ กันทะธง
- Nickname: Yok
- Born: 23 December 1997 (age 28)
- Height: 1.51 m (4 ft 11 in)
- Weight: 42 kg (93 lb)

Sport
- Country: Thailand
- Sport: Teqball
- Events: Women's singles, women's doubles
- Club: Women's Thai Teqball Club
Medal record
Women's teqball
Representing Thailand
World Championships
Gold medal – first place	2023 Bangkok	Women's doubles
Gold medal – first place	2024 Ho Chi Minh City	Women's singles
Gold medal – first place	2024 Ho Chi Minh City	Women's doubles
Gold medal – first place	2025 Odorheiu Secuiesc	Women's singles
Gold medal – first place	2025 Odorheiu Secuiesc	Women's doubles
Silver medal – second place	2023 Bangkok	Women's singles
Asian Games
Gold medal – first place	2026 Aichi–Nagoya	Women's doubles
Asian Beach Games
Gold medal – first place	2026 Sanya	Women's doubles
SEA Games
Gold medal – first place	2025 Thailand	Women's singles
Gold medal – first place	2025 Thailand	Women's doubles

Jutatip Kuntatong (Thai: จุฑาทิพย์ กันทะธง; born 23 December 1997), nicknamed Yok, is a Thai teqball player and former sepak takraw player. She is a five-time world champion, having won the women's singles titles in 2024 and 2025 and three consecutive women's doubles titles with Suphawadi Wongkhamchan from 2023 to 2025.

Kuntatong became the first Asian women's singles world champion when she won the title at the 2024 Teqball World Championships. She successfully defended both her singles and women's doubles world titles in 2025. She later won two gold medals at the 2025 SEA Games, the women's doubles title at the 2026 Asian Beach Games, and the women's doubles gold medal at the 2026 Asian Games.

As of September 2026, the International Teqball Federation (FITEQ) ranked Kuntatong world No. 1 in both women's singles and women's doubles.

== Early life and sepak takraw career ==
Kuntatong began playing sepak takraw at the age of 12, following her father, who was also an athlete. Her involvement in the sport provided opportunities in both competition and education, and she later completed a bachelor's degree at the Chonburi campus of the Thailand National Sports University.

Despite training in sepak takraw for several years, Kuntatong did not represent Thailand at senior international level. She later said that she had reached a national training camp but was not selected for the final team. When teqball was introduced in Thailand, she was encouraged by a teacher to try the new sport and began training in it in 2020. Kuntatong has said that her previous sepak takraw training gave her technical skills that could be adapted to teqball, particularly aerial kicking and attacking techniques.

She made her first appearance at the Teqball World Championships in Nuremberg, Germany, in 2022, reaching the quarterfinals of the women's singles competition.

== Teqball career ==
=== 2023: international breakthrough ===
Kuntatong began achieving international success in 2023. In March, she partnered Suphawadi Wongkhamchan to win the women's doubles title at the Dubai Asian Teqball Tour. The tournament marked one of Thailand's first international teqball titles. Kuntatong and Wongkhamchan subsequently won women's doubles tournaments in Qingdao and Ko Samui and entered the 2023 World Championships unbeaten as a pair that season.

At the 2023 Teqball World Championships in Bangkok, Kuntatong reached her first world championship women's singles final. She lost to Brazil's Rafaella Fontes in straight sets, 8–12, 10–12, earning the silver medal.

The following day, Kuntatong and Wongkhamchan won the women's doubles world title, defeating Hungary's Petra Péchy and Nóra Vicsek 12–8, 12–6 in the final. The victory was Thailand's first world championship gold medal in teqball and the first by an Asian team in the women's doubles event.

=== 2024–2025: singles world titles ===
During 2024, Kuntatong developed into one of the leading women's singles players on the international circuit. In May she won both the women's singles and women's doubles titles at the Madrid Teqball World Series. She defeated Hungary's Anna Izsák 12–6, 12–9 in the singles final.

At the 2024 Teqball World Championships in Ho Chi Minh City, Kuntatong again faced Fontes in the women's singles final. After losing the opening set, she won the next two to take the match 10–12, 12–10, 12–9 and become the first Asian athlete to win the women's singles world championship.

Kuntatong and Wongkhamchan also successfully defended their women's doubles world title, defeating Hungary's Krisztina Ács and Péchy 12–9, 12–9. Kuntatong therefore finished the championships with two gold medals and three career world titles. Following the championships, she rose to No. 1 in the FITEQ women's singles world ranking.

In April 2025, Kuntatong won the women's singles title at the Jinan Teqball World Series, defeating Wongkhamchan in an all-Thai final.

At the 2025 Teqball World Championships in Odorheiu Secuiesc, Romania, she successfully defended the women's singles title, defeating Romania's Kinga Barabási in three sets. Kuntatong and Wongkhamchan then defeated Péchy and Vicsek in the women's doubles final to win their third consecutive world title as a pair. The two victories increased Kuntatong's career total to five world championship gold medals.

Later in December, she competed at the 2025 SEA Games in Thailand, where teqball was contested as a medal sport. Kuntatong won the women's singles gold medal and partnered Wongkhamchan to win the women's doubles event.

=== 2026: Asian Beach Games and Asian Games ===
Kuntatong was selected as one of Thailand's flag bearers for the opening ceremony of the 2026 Asian Beach Games in Sanya, China. At the Games, she partnered Areeya Homdee in women's doubles. The Thai pair defeated North Korea's Sol Gyong Cha and Hyo Gyong Kim in straight sets in the final as Thailand won all three teqball events on the programme.

Teqball made its debut as a medal sport at the 2026 Asian Games in Aichi and Nagoya, Japan. Kuntatong entered the Games as the reigning women's singles and doubles world champion and world No. 1 in both disciplines. Thailand entered Kuntatong in the women's doubles event alongside Wongkhamchan.

The pair completed the group stage unbeaten before reaching the final of the women's doubles. They defeated Myanmar's Hsu Mon Aung and Phyu Phyu Than 12–6, 12–3 to win the gold medal.

== Playing style ==
Kuntatong's playing style incorporates techniques developed during her sepak takraw background. Her attacking game includes aerial kicks and bicycle-kick-style returns, techniques that have also become characteristic of Thailand's approach to teqball. At 1.51 m tall, she has relied on mobility, timing and technical control rather than physical reach.

Kuntatong has described tactical preparation as an important part of her game. She studies video of opponents to identify recurring patterns and weaknesses, and has said that maintaining concentration and limiting unforced errors are particularly important in matches decided over short sets.

== Awards and recognition ==
In February 2026, Kuntatong received an Outstanding Athlete award at Thailand's National Sports Day awards for her performances in 2025. In June, the Sports Writers Association of Thailand named her the country's Amateur Female Athlete of the Year for 2025.

== Major results ==
Year	Competition	Location	Event	Partner	Medal	Ref.
2023	World Championships	Bangkok, Thailand	Women's singles	—	(silver) Silver	
2023	World Championships	Bangkok, Thailand	Women's doubles	Suphawadi Wongkhamchan	(gold) Gold	
2024	World Championships	Ho Chi Minh City, Vietnam	Women's singles	—	(gold) Gold	
2024	World Championships	Ho Chi Minh City, Vietnam	Women's doubles	Suphawadi Wongkhamchan	(gold) Gold	
2025	World Championships	Odorheiu Secuiesc, Romania	Women's singles	—	(gold) Gold	
2025	World Championships	Odorheiu Secuiesc, Romania	Women's doubles	Suphawadi Wongkhamchan	(gold) Gold	
2025	SEA Games	Chonburi, Thailand	Women's singles	—	(gold) Gold	
2025	SEA Games	Chonburi, Thailand	Women's doubles	Suphawadi Wongkhamchan	(gold) Gold	
2026	Asian Beach Games	Sanya, China	Women's doubles	Areeya Homdee	(gold) Gold	
2026	Asian Games	Nagoya, Japan	Women's doubles	Suphawadi Wongkhamchan	(gold) Gold	
