= Suphawadi Wongkhamchan =

Thai teqball player (born 1994)

Personal information
- Native name: สุภาวดี วงศ์คำจันทร์
- Nickname: Nid
- Nationality: Thai
- Born: 2 September 1994 (age 32)
- Height: 1.60 m (5 ft 3 in)
- Weight: 53 kg (117 lb)

Sport
- Country: Thailand
- Sport: Teqball
- Events: Women's doubles, mixed doubles, singles
- Club: Women's Thai Teqball Club
Medal record
Women's teqball
Representing Thailand
World Championships
Gold medal – first place	2023 Bangkok	Women's doubles
Gold medal – first place	2023 Bangkok	Mixed doubles
Gold medal – first place	2024 Ho Chi Minh City	Women's doubles
Gold medal – first place	2024 Ho Chi Minh City	Mixed doubles
Gold medal – first place	2025 Odorheiu Secuiesc	Women's doubles
Silver medal – second place	2025 Odorheiu Secuiesc	Mixed doubles
Asian Games
Gold medal – first place	2026 Aichi–Nagoya	Women's doubles
Gold medal – first place	2026 Aichi–Nagoya	Mixed doubles
Asian Beach Games
Gold medal – first place	2026 Sanya	Mixed doubles
SEA Games
Gold medal – first place	2025 Thailand	Women's doubles
Gold medal – first place	2025 Thailand	Mixed doubles

Suphawadi Wongkhamchan (Thai: สุภาวดี วงศ์คำจันทร์; born 2 September 1994), nicknamed Nid, is a Thai teqball player and former sepak takraw player. She is a five-time world champion, having won three consecutive women's doubles titles with Jutatip Kuntatong from 2023 to 2025 and two consecutive mixed doubles titles with Phakpong Dejaroen in 2023 and 2024.

At the 2026 Asian Games, where teqball made its debut as a medal sport, Wongkhamchan won both events she entered, taking the women's doubles title with Kuntatong and the mixed doubles title with Dejaroen. She had previously won two gold medals at the 2025 SEA Games and the mixed doubles gold medal at the 2026 Asian Beach Games.

As of September 2026, the International Teqball Federation (FITEQ) ranked Wongkhamchan world No. 1 in women's doubles and No. 3 in mixed doubles.

== Early sporting career ==
Wongkhamchan began playing sepak takraw at the age of nine. In a 2023 interview, she said that she had represented Thailand at the 30th King's Cup in 2015 before continuing to compete at club level. She later described herself as having come from a sepak takraw background before being invited by Thai national-team coaches to train in teqball.

The transition initially required her to adjust to teqball's restrictions on consecutive touches with the same body part and to the smaller, curved playing surface. Wongkhamchan said that she found the sport difficult during her first weeks of training but gradually adapted to its rules and techniques.

In 2021, Wongkhamchan won the women's doubles event and took bronze in women's singles at the Thai national teqball championships. She made her first appearance at the Teqball World Championships in 2022 in Nuremberg, Germany, reaching the women's doubles quarterfinals with Areeya Homdee.

== Teqball career ==
=== 2023: international breakthrough and first world titles ===
Wongkhamchan's international breakthrough came at the Dubai Asian Teqball Tour in March 2023. She and Kuntatong won the women's doubles title, while Wongkhamchan and Dejaroen won mixed doubles. The victories were reported as Thailand's first international teqball tournament titles.

At the 2023 SEA Games in Cambodia, where teqball was contested as a demonstration sport, she won the women's doubles with Kuntatong and the mixed doubles with Dejaroen. Later that year she won the women's singles title at the 2023 Thailand National Games, defeating Kuntatong in the final.

The 2023 Teqball World Championships were held in Bangkok, the first edition of the tournament staged outside Europe. Wongkhamchan and Kuntatong defeated Hungary's Petra Pechy and Nora Vicsek 12–8, 12–6 in the women's doubles final, becoming the first Thai and Asian teqball world champions. Wongkhamchan then partnered Dejaroen to defeat Brazil's Vania Moraes da Cruz and Leonardo Lindoso de Almeida 12–4, 12–9 in the mixed doubles final.

She was the only player to win two gold medals at the championships. In its post-tournament statistical review, FITEQ identified Wongkhamchan as the competition's leading performer by overall point differential per match, at 15.64.

=== 2024–2025: world championship dominance ===
Wongkhamchan and Kuntatong remained unbeaten in women's doubles through much of 2024, winning World Series titles including events in Madrid and Qingdao. At the 2024 Teqball World Championships in Ho Chi Minh City, Vietnam, they successfully defended their women's doubles title, defeating Petra Pechy and Krisztina Acs of Hungary 12–9, 12–9. Wongkhamchan also retained the mixed doubles world title with Dejaroen as Thailand won four of the five events at the championships.

Following the 2024 World Championships, Wongkhamchan and Kuntatong rose to No. 1 in the FITEQ women's doubles world ranking, the first Thai pair to reach the top position in that category.

In April 2025 Wongkhamchan reached the women's singles final at the Jinan Teqball World Series, losing to Kuntatong, and won the mixed doubles event with Dejaroen.

At the 2025 Teqball World Championships in Odorheiu Secuiesc, Romania, Wongkhamchan and Kuntatong won their third consecutive women's doubles world title, defeating Pechy and Vicsek in three sets, 12–9, 8–12, 12–6. The victory gave Wongkhamchan her fifth world championship title. She also won silver in mixed doubles with Dejaroen after losing the final to Romania's Kinga Barabási and Apor Györgydeák.

A few days later, Wongkhamchan won two gold medals at the 2025 SEA Games in Thailand. She retained the women's doubles title with Kuntatong and won the mixed doubles with Dejaroen as Thailand swept all five teqball gold medals. The 2025 Games were the first SEA Games in which teqball was contested as an official medal sport, after appearing as a demonstration sport in 2023.

=== 2026: Asian Games ===
At the 2026 Asian Beach Games in Sanya, China, Wongkhamchan and Dejaroen won the mixed doubles gold medal, defeating North Korea's Kim Il-sin and Han Song 12–6, 12–10 in the final. Thailand won all three teqball events contested at the Games.

Teqball made its Asian Games debut at the 2026 Asian Games in Aichi and Nagoya, Japan. Wongkhamchan competed in women's doubles and mixed doubles. In the mixed doubles final, she and Dejaroen defeated Japan's Yuina Sakamoto and Akinori Wase 12–4, 12–5, earning Thailand's first gold medal of the Games.

Later the same day, Wongkhamchan and Kuntatong defeated Myanmar's Hsu Mon Aung and Phyu Phyu Than 12–6, 12–3 in the women's doubles final, giving Wongkhamchan her second gold medal of the Games. Thailand ultimately won all three teqball events it entered at the Games.

== Playing style ==
Wongkhamchan has described attacking play as the strongest part of her game. Her style incorporates the aerial kicking and spiking techniques she developed in sepak takraw, particularly when playing doubles. She has said that adapting those skills to teqball required greater control over placement because of the curved table and the rule prohibiting consecutive contacts with the same body part.

In mixed doubles, Wongkhamchan has identified receiving the faster serves and attacking shots of male opponents as one of the additional tactical challenges of the discipline. She has said that preparation includes studying opponents' preferred serving locations and patterns.

== Major results ==
Year	Competition	Location	Event	Partner	Medal	Ref.
2023	World Championships	Bangkok, Thailand	Women's doubles	Jutatip Kuntatong	(gold) Gold	
2023	World Championships	Bangkok, Thailand	Mixed doubles	Phakpong Dejaroen	(gold) Gold	
2024	World Championships	Ho Chi Minh City, Vietnam	Women's doubles	Jutatip Kuntatong	(gold) Gold	
2024	World Championships	Ho Chi Minh City, Vietnam	Mixed doubles	Phakpong Dejaroen	(gold) Gold	
2025	World Championships	Odorheiu Secuiesc, Romania	Women's doubles	Jutatip Kuntatong	(gold) Gold	
2025	World Championships	Odorheiu Secuiesc, Romania	Mixed doubles	Phakpong Dejaroen	(silver) Silver	
2025	SEA Games	Chonburi, Thailand	Women's doubles	Jutatip Kuntatong	(gold) Gold	
2025	SEA Games	Chonburi, Thailand	Mixed doubles	Phakpong Dejaroen	(gold) Gold	
2026	Asian Beach Games	Sanya, China	Mixed doubles	Phakpong Dejaroen	(gold) Gold	
2026	Asian Games	Nagoya, Japan	Women's doubles	Jutatip Kuntatong	(gold) Gold	
2026	Asian Games	Nagoya, Japan	Mixed doubles	Phakpong Dejaroen	(gold) Gold	
