= Viktor Huszár =

Hungarian businessman (born 1985)

Viktor Dénes Huszár (born 8 May 1985) is a Hungarian businessman, film producer, sports administrator and international speaker. He is one of three co-founders and co-inventors of teqball, the CEO of Teqball Holding, the Chairman of the International Federation of Teqball (FITEQ) and the President of the Football Club of the Budapest University of Technology and Economics.

== Career ==
Viktor Huszár is one of three co-founders and co-inventors of the sport of teqball, alongside Gábor Borsányi and György Gattyán.

Huszár is an international speaker on technologies used in sports, especially in football. He became the first Hungarian to speak on the main stage at a Web Summit when he launched FITEQ’s mobile application SQILLER with Ronaldinho in front of 15,000 at the 2019 edition in Lisbon.

Huszár has also worked as a film producer. He was a producer on the set of Final Cut: Ladies and Gentlemen, which was directed by György Pálfi. The film was shown at the 2012 Cannes Film Festival. Huszár also featured in La Femme Magazin’s 50 young Hungarian talents.
