= Indoor hockey at the 2023 SEA Games =

- Venue: Rong Roeung Hall (Indoor Hockey)
- Location: Phnom Penh, Cambodia
- Date: 1–7 May 2023
- Competitors: 144 from 6 nations

Champions
- Men: Indonesia
- Women: Thailand

The Indoor hockey competition at the 2023 SEA Games featured two events and the competitions took place at the Rong Roeung Hall, Phnom Penh, Cambodia from 1–7 May 2023.

== Participants ==
A total of 6 nations took part of this competition.

- Cambodia
- Indonesia
- Malaysia
- Philippines
- Singapore
- Thailand

== Medal summary ==
=== Medal table ===
Key

* Host nation (Cambodia)

Rank	Nation	Gold	Silver	Bronze	Total
1	Indonesia	1	0	1	2
1	Thailand	1	0	1	2
3	Malaysia	0	2	0	2
4	Cambodia*	0	0	1	1
4	Singapore	0	0	1	1
Totals (5 entries)		2	2	4	8

=== Medalists ===
Event	Gold	Silver	Bronze
Men's tournament	Indonesia; Adi Darmawan Leksono; Alam Fajar Kusuma; Andrea Guntara Adivery Sandrea; Astri Rahmad; Candra Juli Prawesti; Fajar Jaelani Nugraha; Ferdian Fathur Rahman; Ilham Wiranata Kusuma; Muhamad Alfiana; Muhammad Hendri Firdaus; Prima Rinaldi Santoso; Revo Priliandro	Malaysia; Abdul Khaliq Hamirin; Adam Aiman Mamat; Danial Asyraf Abdul Ghani; Faridzul Afiq; Muhammad Aslam Hanafiah; Muhammad Firdaus Omar; Mohd Hazrul Faiz Ahmad Sobri; Muhamad Izham Azhar; Mohd Khairul Afendy Kamaruzaman; Mohd Nurhafizie Jamil Azomi; Razali Mohd Hazemi; Syed Mohd Syafiq Syed Cholan	Thailand; Warawut A-nukoon; Warun Boonpea; Arithat Chalattam; Nichanon Ketsawad; Jarernchai Noonee; Kittithat Sori; Pongpon Sukwong; Anuson Suyaram; Thoranin Trongthaisong; Sarawut Wangchua; Thanawat Wiyaboon; Wiros Yotsiri
Men's tournament	Indonesia; Adi Darmawan Leksono; Alam Fajar Kusuma; Andrea Guntara Adivery Sandrea; Astri Rahmad; Candra Juli Prawesti; Fajar Jaelani Nugraha; Ferdian Fathur Rahman; Ilham Wiranata Kusuma; Muhamad Alfiana; Muhammad Hendri Firdaus; Prima Rinaldi Santoso; Revo Priliandro	Malaysia; Abdul Khaliq Hamirin; Adam Aiman Mamat; Danial Asyraf Abdul Ghani; Faridzul Afiq; Muhammad Aslam Hanafiah; Muhammad Firdaus Omar; Mohd Hazrul Faiz Ahmad Sobri; Muhamad Izham Azhar; Mohd Khairul Afendy Kamaruzaman; Mohd Nurhafizie Jamil Azomi; Razali Mohd Hazemi; Syed Mohd Syafiq Syed Cholan	Singapore; Abdul Hanif Murid; Aik Yu Chen; Arasu Ct Karuppiah; Gerald Wong Jing Yang; Loogeswaran Arumugam; Mayazhagu Guhan; Muhammad Hidayat Mat Rahim; Mohd Jumaeen Amat Kamsin; Muhd Shafiq Abdul Rashid; Muhammad Syafiq Ibrahim; Syed Syahmi Syed Ali; Timothy Goh Kai Yang
Women's tournament	Thailand; Benjamas Bureewan; Wilawan Duangwao; Priyakorn Jomjan; Kittiya Losantia; Phimmada Metta; Papichaya Ogbuneke; Chatchanan Pathumpairot; Phimphakan Phakdeengam; Tikhamporn Sakulpithak; Somlak Suttiprapa; Jiratchaya Todkaew; Thanaporn Tongkham	Malaysia; Farah Ayuni Yahya; Fazilla Sylvester Silin; Iren Hussin; Nor Asfarina Isahyifiqa Isahhidun; Nur Atira Mohamad Ismail; Nur Hazlinda Zainal Abidin; Nuraslinda Said; Nurul Farawahida Marzuki; Putri Nur Batrisyia Nor Nawawi; Qasidah Najwa Muhd Halimi; Raja Norsharina Raja Shabuddin; Surizan Awang Noh	Indonesia; Ai Melis Kusmiati; Annur Amalia El Islamy; Citra Purbasari; Desi Ratna Wardani; Novita Natalia Since; Nuraini Sugiarti; Patmawati; Putri Krismonita; Rahma Dwi Aulia; Selly Amalia Florentina; Winda Risdiyanti; Zulita Dwi Aprilia
Women's tournament	Thailand; Benjamas Bureewan; Wilawan Duangwao; Priyakorn Jomjan; Kittiya Losantia; Phimmada Metta; Papichaya Ogbuneke; Chatchanan Pathumpairot; Phimphakan Phakdeengam; Tikhamporn Sakulpithak; Somlak Suttiprapa; Jiratchaya Todkaew; Thanaporn Tongkham	Malaysia; Farah Ayuni Yahya; Fazilla Sylvester Silin; Iren Hussin; Nor Asfarina Isahyifiqa Isahhidun; Nur Atira Mohamad Ismail; Nur Hazlinda Zainal Abidin; Nuraslinda Said; Nurul Farawahida Marzuki; Putri Nur Batrisyia Nor Nawawi; Qasidah Najwa Muhd Halimi; Raja Norsharina Raja Shabuddin; Surizan Awang Noh	Cambodia; Duch Chansovatey; Dy Koemyean; Eng Chakriya; Eng Sreysros; Heng Ry; Lun Monika; Nida Majeed; Mam Ta; Phor Misan; Seng Sorphorn; Sin Raksa; Vun Saroeu
