= Cellcard =

Cambodian telecommunications company

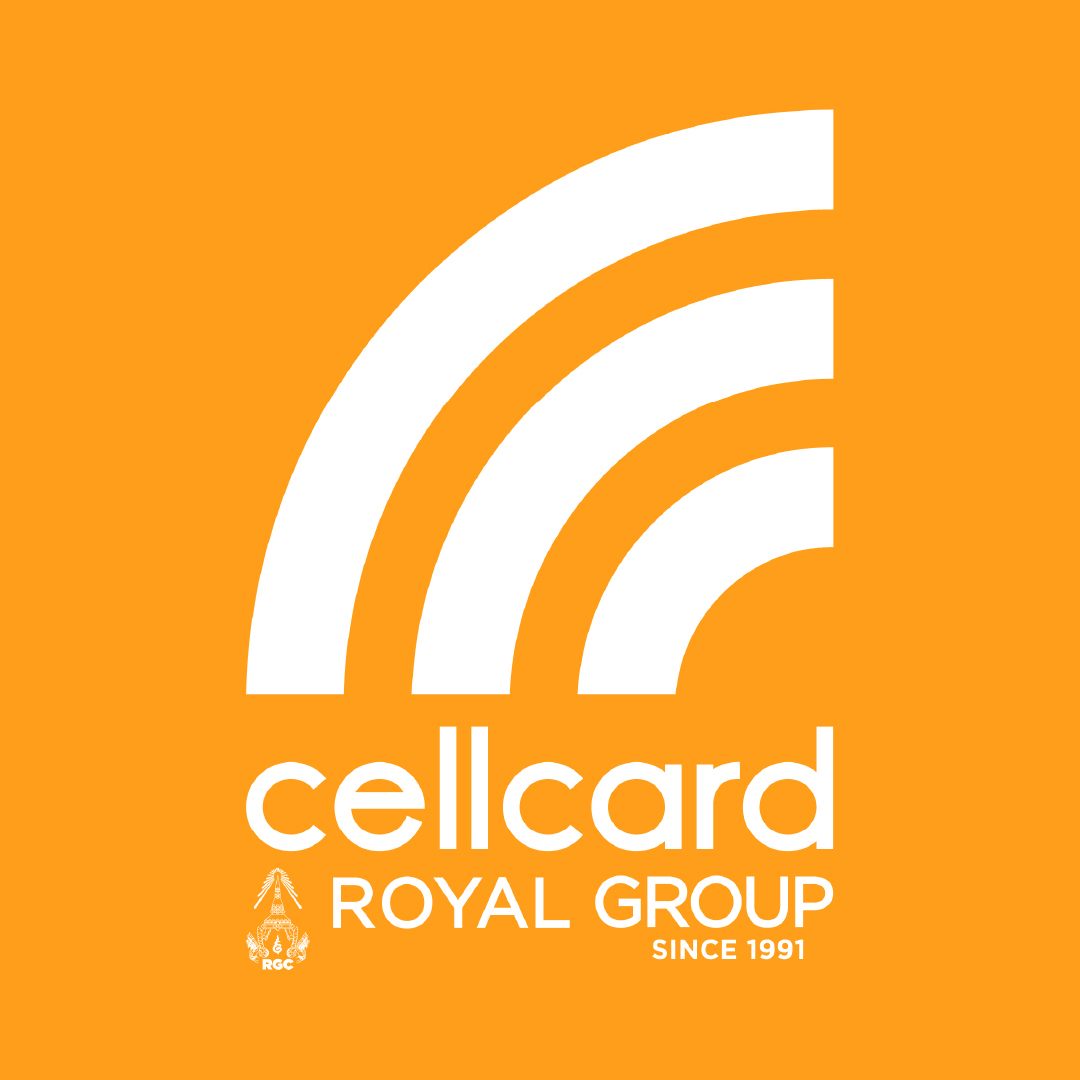
Telecommunication Cambodia

cellcard, a trademark of CamGSM Co. Ltd, is a Cambodian-owned and operated telecommunications company, offering mobile communications and entertainment services for both consumer and corporate markets. It was launched in 1998.

== History ==
CamGSM Co. Ltd, a corporation duly established in 1996, and the mother brand of Cellcard (launched in 1998), was originally a joint venture between Luxembourg-based Millicom International Cellular S.A. (61.5%) and The Royal Group of Companies (38.5%). In 2009, RG acquired Millicom's share for US$346 million, making it the only telecommunications company in the country, 100% Cambodian-owned and operated.
