= Mátraballa =

- Village
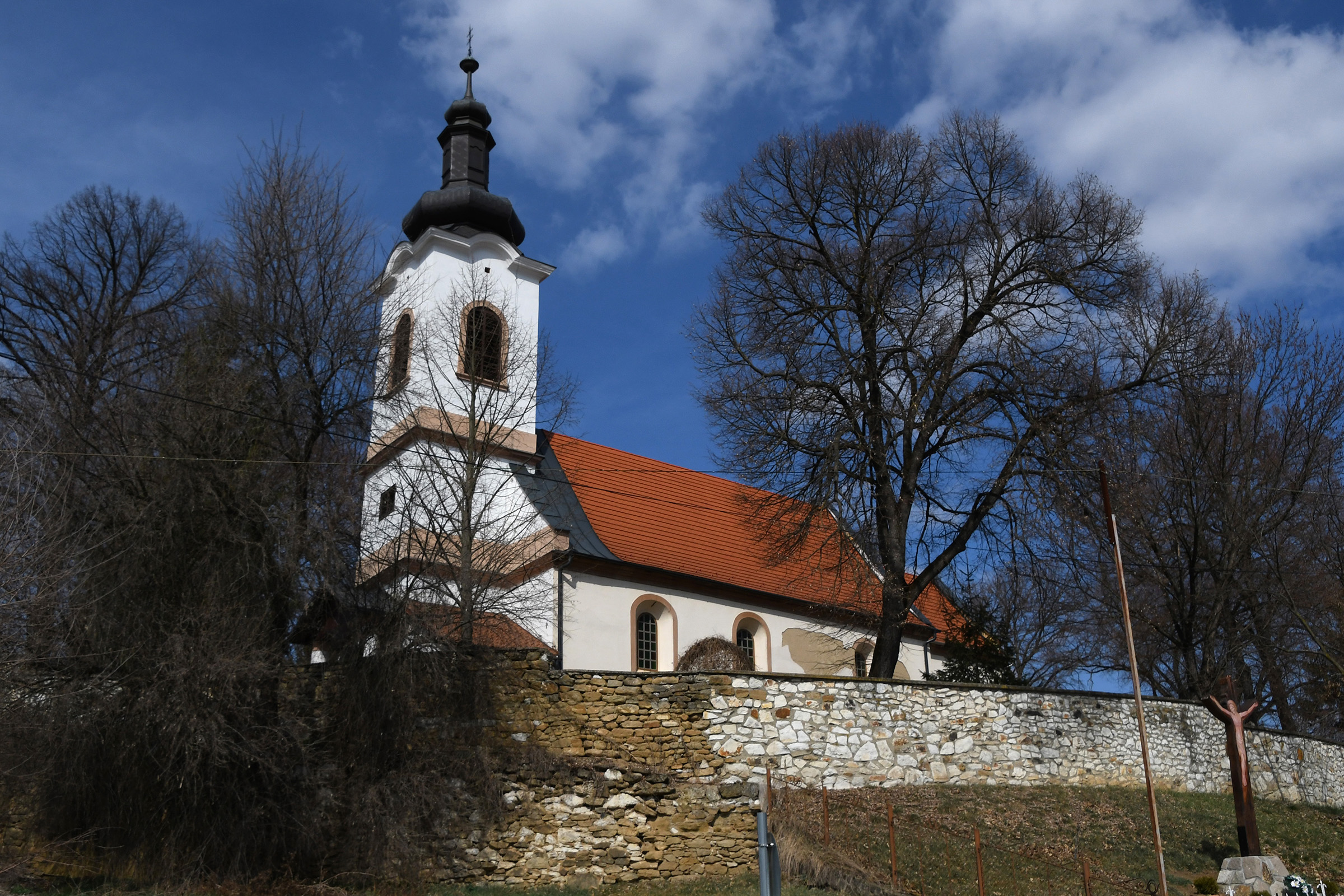
- Saint Nicholas church

- Coat of arms

- Location in Hungary
- Coordinates: 47°59′10″N 20°01′19″E
- Country: Hungary
- County: Heves
- District: Pétervására
- First mentioned: 1311

Government
  - Mayor: Péter Mayer (MEMO)

Area
  - Total: 26.36 km^{2} (10.18 sq mi)

Population (2022)
  - Total: 668
  - Density: 25.3/km^{2} (65.6/sq mi)
- Time zone: UTC+1 (CET)
  - Summer (DST): UTC+2 (CEST)
- Postal code: 3247
- Area code: 36
- Website: www.matraballa.hu

Mátraballa is a village in Heves County, Hungary, under the Mátra mountain range, beside of the Balla creek. As of 2022 census, it has a population of 668 (see Demographics). The village located 18.8 km from the main road 21 and 40.8 km from the M25 expressway. The (Nr. 84) Kisterenye–Kál-Kápolna railway line going across the village. Although the settlement has its own railway station, public transport on the railway line ceased on 3 March 2007. The closest train station with public transport is in Bátonyterenye 18.9 km away.

== History ==
The first documented mention of the settlement was in the form of Ballya, in 1447 it was already known as Barla. Due to the destruction by the Ottomans, it became depopulated in the 16th century. The owner of the village was Gábor Perényi, then Kristóf Országh, and then the crown. King Maximilian pledged it in 1575 to the chief captain of Eger, Baron Christoph von Ungnad. His widow Anna Losonczi donated it to her second husband, Count Sigismund Forgách, and then in 1603 Baron Sigismund Rákóczi bought it. After several changes of ownership, the other part of the village was sold by Count Ferenc Wesselényi to György Semsey in 1654, who obtained a royal donation for it. The settlement's church was built of stone in 1696. Count Antal Grassalkovich acquired the right of ownership over the village from 1730. The Orczy family built the clergy house in 1806, which still stands today as a listed building. Count György Károlyi became the new owner of the village in 1847. The settlement also created a Palóc folk museum, which preserves the objects of daily use in the village. The writer József Solymár spent his childhood in the settlement and later wrote several works about the everyday life of Palóc people. The monument to the Millennium Deer, by Róbert Király, was built in 2000 on a 30-ton stone.

== Demographics ==
According the 2022 census, 93.0% of the population were Hungarians, 0.6% were Gypsies and 7.0% did not wish to answer. The religious distribution was as follows: 58.9% Roman Catholic, 3.6% Calvinist, 8.9% non-denominational, and 25.9% did not wish to answer. 670 people lived in the village and only 1 person on a farm.

Population by years:

Year	1870	1880	1890	1900	1910	1920	1930	1941
Population	978	852	970	1014	1118	1208	1268	1291
Year	1949	1960	1970	1980	1990	2001	2011	2022
Population	1186	1265	1245	1142	1028	903	823	668

== Politics ==
Mayors since 1990:

- 1990–1994: János Bíró (independent)
- 1994–2014: János László Forgó (independent)
- 2014–2019: Róbert Dudás (Jobbik)
- 2019–2024: Henriett Gyuricza, Mrs. Pádár (independent)
- 2024–: Péter Mayer (MEMO)
