= 3x3 basketball at the 2023 SEA Games =

3×3 Basketball at the 2023 SEA Games
- Venue: Morodok Techo Indoor Sports Center
- Dates: 6 – 7 May 2023

3x3 basketball will be among the sports contested at the 2023 SEA Games in Cambodia. The events will be contested from 6 to 7 May 2023. Total 8 team will participate in both men's and women's tournaments.

== Participating nations ==
Nation	Men	Women
Cambodia	Yes	Yes
Indonesia	Yes	Yes
Laos	Yes	Yes
Malaysia	Yes	Yes
Philippines	Yes	Yes
Singapore	Yes	Yes
Thailand	Yes	Yes
Vietnam	Yes	Yes
Total: 8 NOCs	8	8

== Medal table ==
* Host nation (Cambodia)

Rank	Nation	Gold	Silver	Bronze	Total
1	Cambodia*	1	0	0	1
1	Vietnam	1	0	0	1
3	Philippines	0	2	0	2
4	Indonesia	0	0	1	1
4	Thailand	0	0	1	1
Totals (5 entries)		2	2	2	6

== Medalists ==
Event	Gold	Silver	Bronze
Men's 3x3 tournament	Cambodia; Dorsey Darrinray; Sayeed Pridgett; Brandon Jerome Peterson; Chhorath Tep	Philippines; Almond Vosotros; Joseph Eriobu; Lervin Flores; Joseph Sedurifa	Thailand; Tra Holder; Frederick Lee Jones Lish; Moses Morgan; Chanatip Jakrawan
Women's 3x3 tournament	Vietnam; Trương Thảo My; Trương Thảo Vy; Huỳnh Thị Ngoan; Nguyễn Thị Tiểu Duy	Philippines; Jack Animam; Afril Bernardino; Janine Pontejos; Mikka Cacho	Indonesia; Adelaide Callista Wongsoharjo; Agustin Elya Gradita Retong; Kimberley Pierre-Louis; Dyah Lestari
