= Natalia Guitler =

Brazilian tennis player (born 1987)

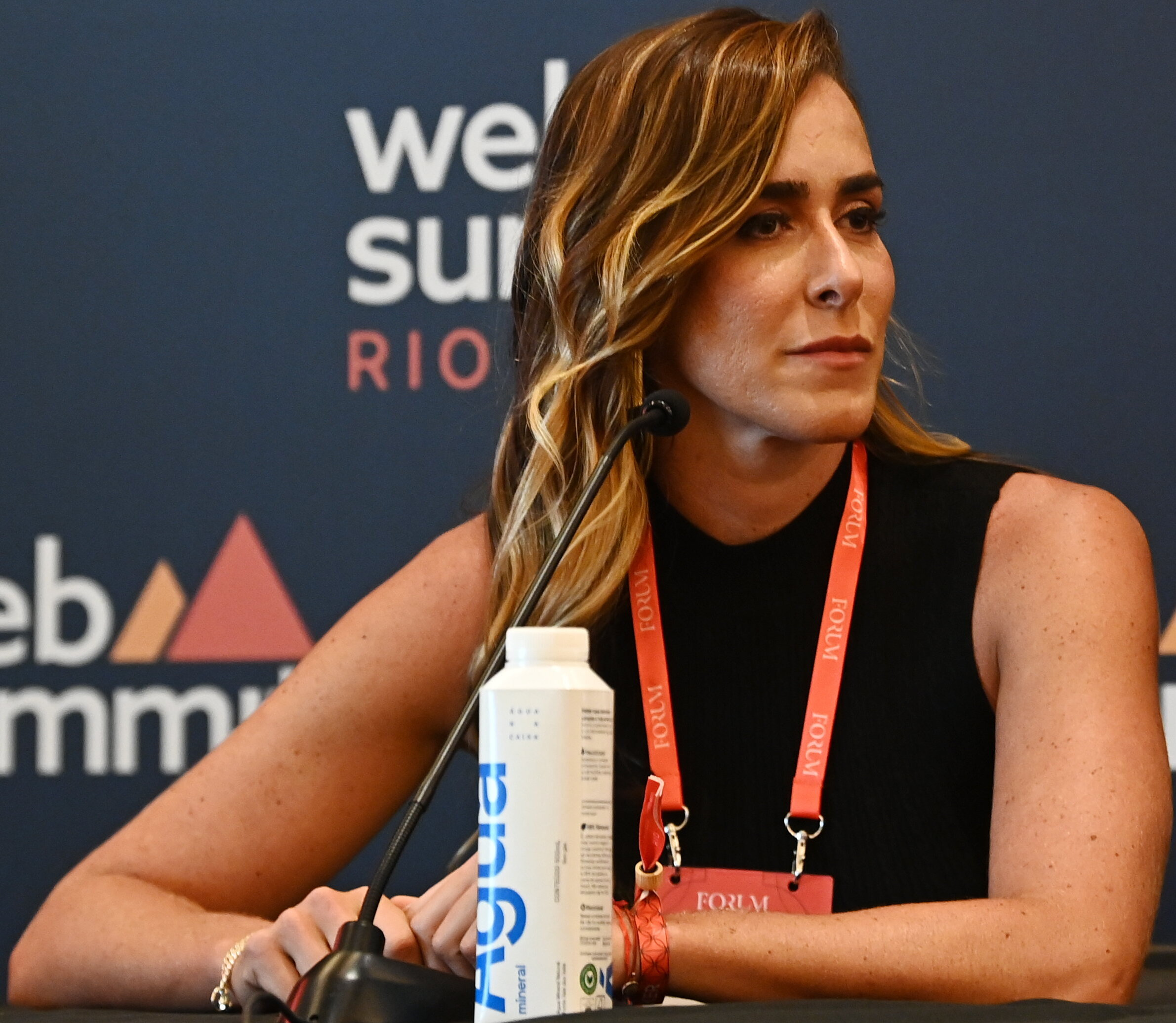
- Guitler at the Web Summit Rio, 2023
- Born: 4 June 1987 (age 39); Rio de Janeiro, Brazil
- Occupations: Tennis player, Teqball player, Footballer, Freestyle footballer, Businesswoman, digital influencer

Natalia Guitler (born 4 June 1987) is a Brazilian former professional tennis player, freestyle footballer, footvolley player, teqball player, businesswoman and digital influencer.

She is a seven-time Footvolley world champion and a teqball world champion, recognized for her contributions to the growth of women's Footvolley and teqball. Guitler has also gained prominence for her collaborations with high-profile athletes like Neymar and Ronaldinho Gaúcho and her role in promoting sports through her training center and social media presence.

== Biography ==
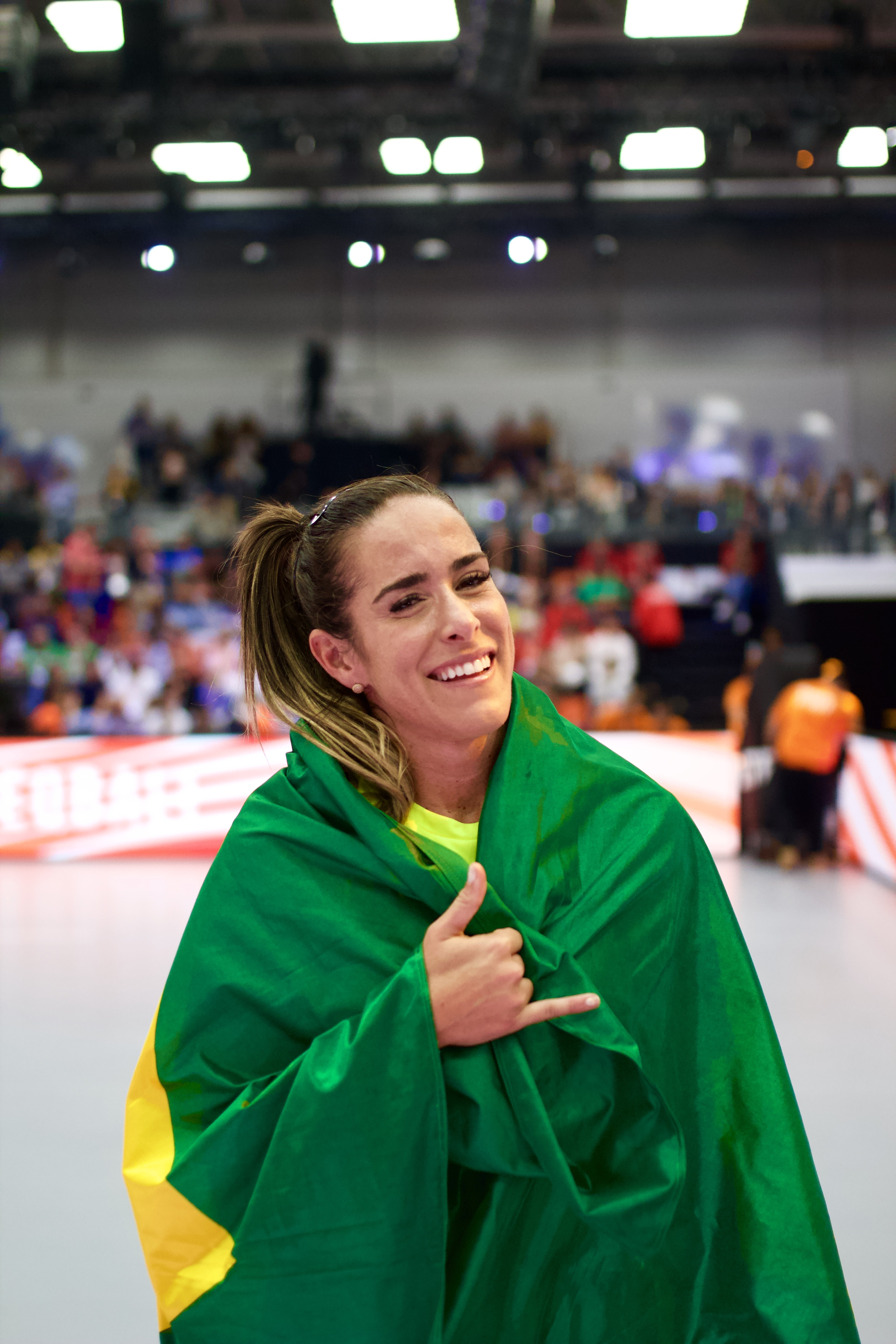
Guitler in 2019

Guitler was born in Rio de Janeiro, Brazil. Her family is originally from Argentina, from where her parents emigrated in 1980. She is the fourth daughter of Leonor Rosa Maman and Cesar Alberto Guitler. She has three older brothers, Gaston, Felipe and Lucas. Growing up in a condominium with access to football and tennis courts, she was introduced to sports at a young age by her family, particularly her brothers and father. She began playing football and tennis as a child, showing early talent in both.

At age 10, Guitler started playing futevôlei, though it remained a hobby until later in her career.

Her family's Argentine heritage led her to train in Argentina during her teenage years, where she pursued a professional tennis career.

== Tennis career ==
When Guitler was just four years old, she started playing tennis, a sport that led her to live in Argentina for five years. On 6 July 2009, she reached her highest WTA singles ranking of 454 whilst her best doubles ranking was 461 on 2 November 2009. Guitler has won one singles and four doubles titles on the ITF Circuit. She left professional tennis at the end of 2009. She won titles at the junior level but faced challenges due to limited competitive opportunities in Brazil and the high costs of pursuing the sport abroad.

At age 21, Guitler retired from tennis due to financial, psychological, and logistical pressures, returning to Brazil to live with her family

During this period, she briefly explored other sports, including football, handebol, surfing, snooker, altinha, and bocha, reflecting her broad passion for athletics. She later earned a degree in Administration and a postgraduate degree in Sports Marketing, preparing for a career beyond athletics.

== Teqball career ==
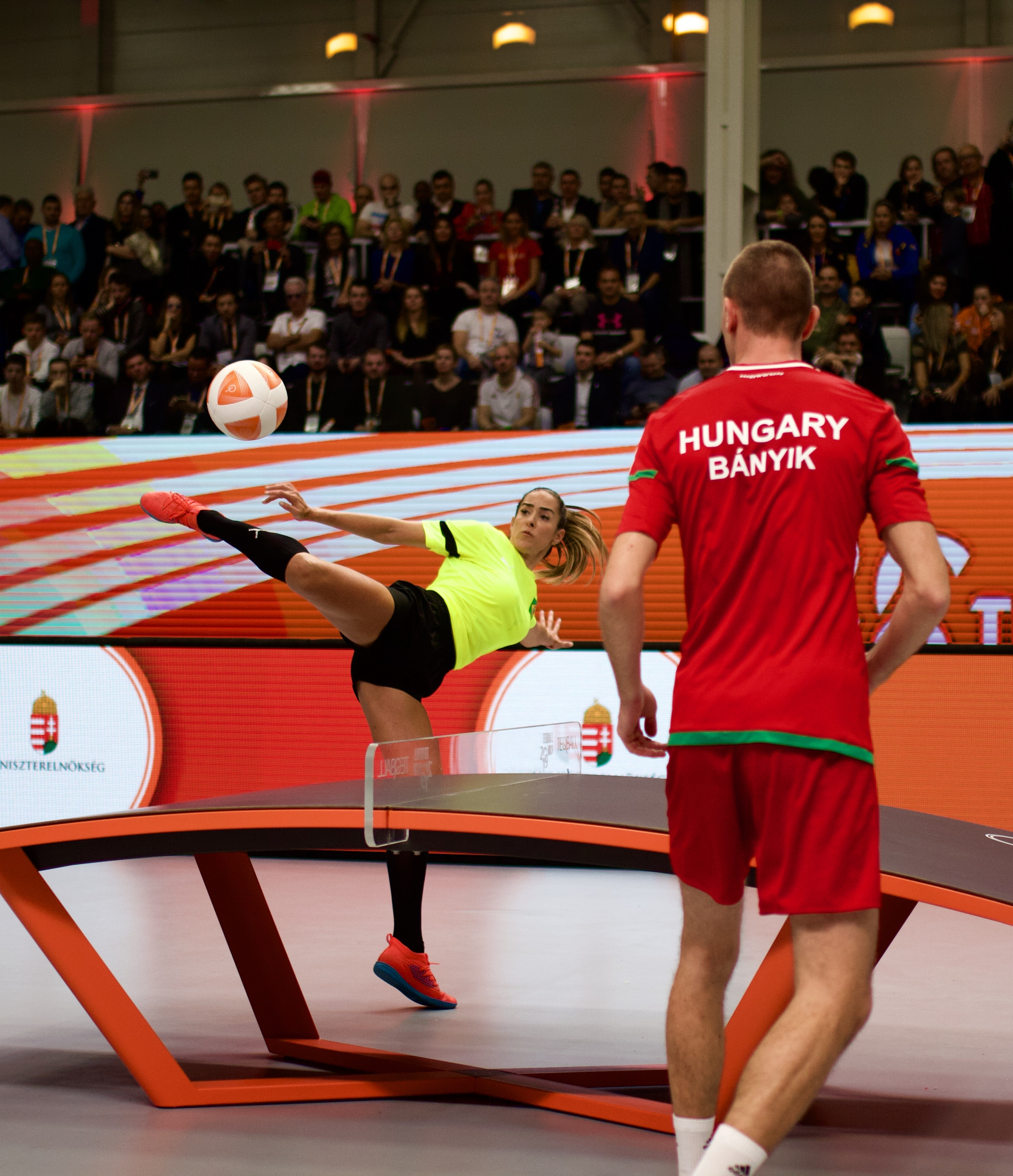
Guitler playing Teqball in 2019

In 2018, Guitler was introduced to teqball, after tennis, a sport combining elements of table tennis and football, by Ronaldinho Gaúcho, a global ambassador for the sport. She played her first teqball game at Ronaldinho's home, catching the attention of the president of the French Teqball Federation, who invited her to compete in the World Championships in France.

Despite minimal preparation and limited knowledge of the rules, Guitler, paired with Marcos Vieira, finished fourth in the mixed doubles category, competing against 50 countries.

In 2019, Guitler and Vieira won the teqball world championship in Budapest, Hungary, making her the first woman to achieve this title.

Her success was attributed to her work with Master Coach Zé André, who provided sports coaching to enhance her focus, pressure management, and performance.

In June 2021, Guitler and Marcos Vieira topped the teqball mixed doubles world rankings after winning the Brazilian national stage, despite limited competition during the pandemic.

She expressed optimism about teqball's potential inclusion in the 2028 Olympics, citing its inclusion in the 2023 European Games, though the sport lacked recognition by the International Olympic Committee at the time. In August 2021, Guitler was featured on the podcast Esportivamente, discussing her transition from tennis to Footvoleyand teqball and her role in inspiring more women to participate in these sports.

In December, she appeared on the gamified podcast PlayerTalks, where she discussed her career, resilience, and the importance of soft skills like teamwork and focus.

== Footvolley career ==
In 2010, while still in Argentina, Guitler was introduced to Footvoley by one of her brothers, sparking an immediate passion for the sport. Initially a hobby, Footvoleybecame a serious pursuit after she retired from tennis. By 2017, at age 30, Guitler began competing professionally in futevôlei, leveraging skills developed from her tennis and football background.

=== Rise in Footvoley (2018–2020) ===
In 2018 she began competing in Footvoley world championships, winning her first title with partner Vanessa Tabarez.

During the COVID-19 pandemic in 2020, Guitler adapted her training with the help of personal trainer Ricardo Lapa, focusing on bodyweight exercises to maintain conditioning while unable to train on the beach.

Both Footvoleyand teqball grew in popularity during this period due to their outdoor nature and minimal participant requirements.

Natalia has gained national and international fame by showing her entire category in Footvolley and futmesa matches against well-known athletes like Neymar and Ronaldinho among others.

Her talent earned her the signing of an agreement with adidas, representing the brand as an ambassador for women's football and with Mikasa, signing her official Futvolley ball.

=== Recognition and Media Presence (2021–2022) ===
In 2021, Guitler's prominence increased through media appearances and accolades. In February, she participated in the "Reis e Rainhas do Drible" event, representing Team Falcão and showcasing her skills alongside futsal star Amandinha.

In June, she was honored with a character in the video game FIFA 21, available in the VOLTA mode's “Innovadores” team from 25 June to 2 July, allowing players to recruit her by defeating her team.

By late 2021, Guitler had won three Rainha da Praia titles, six Brazilian Footvoleychampionships, and two world titles: one in Footvoleywith Vanessa Tabarez in Copacabana and another in teqball with Rafaella Fontes in Poland. Her growing social media presence, with over 2 million Instagram followers, amplified her influence. In 2022, Guitler continued to compete and expand her legacy. In May, she published an article in The Players’ Tribune, detailing her journey from tennis to futevôlei and teqball and her ambition to compete in the Olympics. In June, she played Footvoleyalongside Neymar, emphasizing their competitive yet friendly partnership. In August, she appeared on the OtaLab program, discussing her role in inspiring women in sports, the financial challenges of living solely from futevôlei and teqball, and her experiences with sexism in both sports.

She revealed that her income primarily came from social media and sponsorships as an influencer, not from her sports achievements. In October 2022, Guitler inaugurated the Centro de Treinamento Natalia Guitler (CT) at Barra da Tijuca Beach in Rio de Janeiro, a facility to teach Footvoleyto children and aspiring athletes. The CT, located near Posto 6, opened classes on 3 November 2022, with Guitler developing the methodology alongside coaches Pamella Leobons and Marcelo Lyra. The inauguration was attended by celebrities like Larissa Manoela, Aline Campos, and Petkovic, as well as influencer Luva de Pedreiro, who congratulated her online.

=== Continued Success and Advocacy (2023–2025) ===
In February 2023, Guitler debuted as a commentator for the Liga Paulista de Footvoley on SporTV, marking her entry into sports media. In March, she won her fourth futevôlei world championship with Vanessa Tabarez, having secured titles twice in Israel and twice in Brazil. She expressed her dream of seeing Footvoleyand teqball included in the Olympics, aiming to win medals in both.

Guitler also launched a signature futevôlei ball in partnership with Mikasa, further cementing her influence in the sport. In October 2023, Guitler and Tabarez competed in the World Footvolley event in Capivari de Baixo, Santa Catarina, where she noted the growing competitiveness of women's Footvoleyin Brazil.

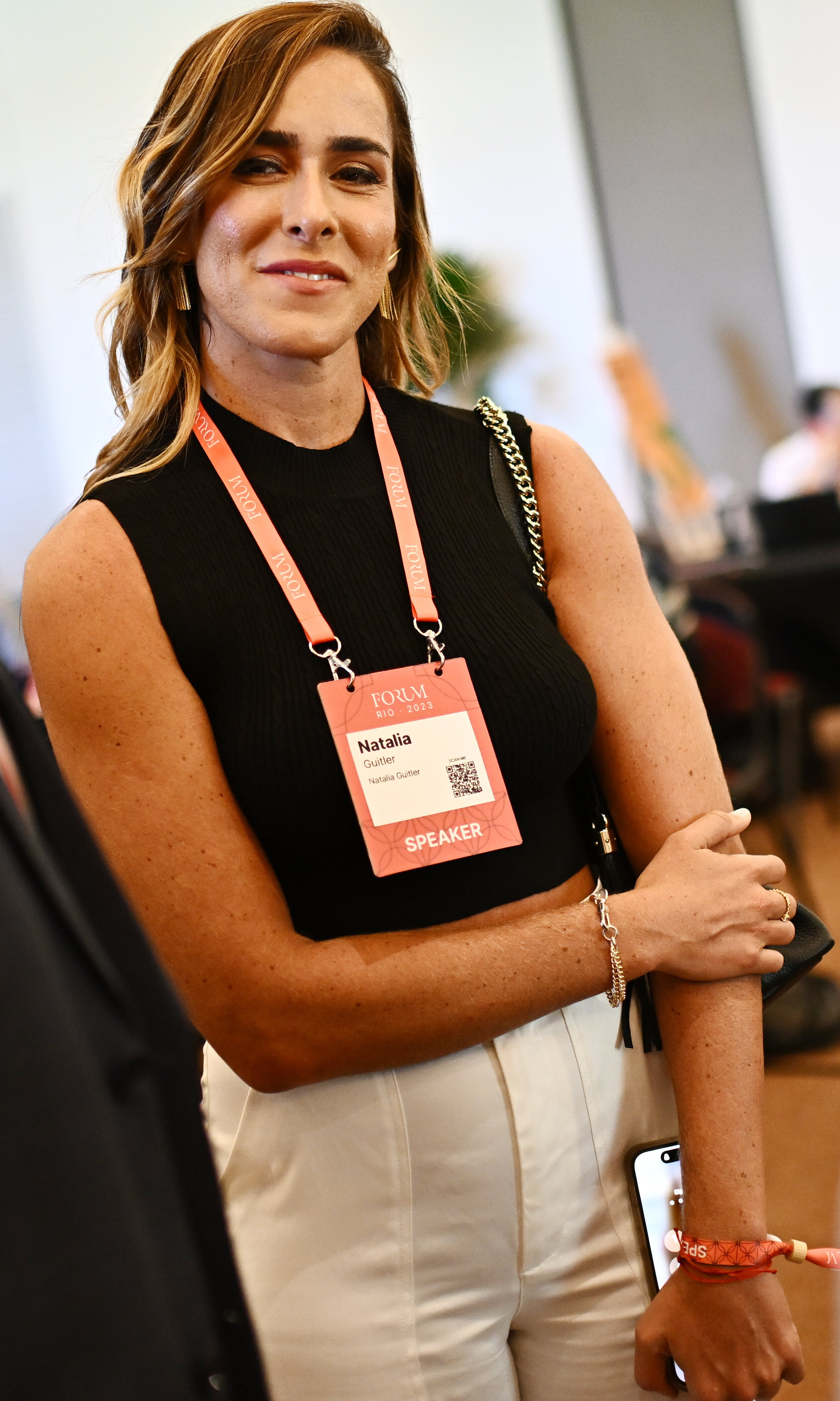
Guitler at the Web Summit Rio in 2023

She highlighted the emergence of new athletes and the promising future of the sport, despite not winning the 2020 title, which went to Lana and Josy.

In 2024, Guitler continued to compete and promote futevôlei. In February, UOL published a feature on her transition from tennis to futevôlei, noting her status as an icon in the sport and her friendships with Neymar and Ronaldinho. She expressed support for young Brazilian tennis player João Fonseca, predicting his rise to the top 100.

In March 2025, Guitler and Tabarez won their sixth joint futevôlei world championship in Israel, securing her seventh overall title and the designation of heptacampeã (seven-time champion). They defeated the United States in the final, reinforcing their dominance.

Guitler emphasized the importance of reinventing herself, maintaining discipline, and working with a multidisciplinary team for physical and mental preparation.

She outlined future goals, including continued high-level competition, expanding her CT and Instituto Natalia Guitler, and launching a lecture series to promote sports and support women.

== Football career ==
Guitler represented Brazil in football at the 2017 Maccabiah Games, scoring for the team during the tournament.

== ITF Circuit finals ==
$10,000 tournaments

=== Singles (1–2) ===
Result	No.	Date	Location	Surface	Opponent	Score
Loss	1	14 September 2008	Santos, Brazil	Clay	(Brazil) Fernanda Hermenegildo	3–6, 4–6
Win	1	7 December 2008	Fortaleza, Brazil	Clay	(Brazil) Nathália Rossi	3–6, 6–3, 6–2
Loss	2	30 August 2010	Barueri, Brazil	Hard	(Argentina) Mailen Auroux	4–6, 2–6

=== Doubles (4–4) ===
Outcome	No.	Date	Location	Surface	Partner	Opponents	Score
Loss	1	4 May 2008	Bell Ville, Argentina	Clay	(Brazil) Joana Cortez	(Argentina) Tatiana Búa (Colombia) Karen Castiblanco	4–6, 6–1, [7–10]
Win	1	25 May 2008	Managua, Nicaragua	Hard	(Brazil) Nathália Rossi	(United States) Kit Carson (Netherlands) Nicole Monteiro	3–6, 7–6^{(2)}, [11–9]
Loss	2	27 July 2008	Brasília, Brazil	Clay	(Argentina) Carla Beltrami	(Brazil) Fabiana Chiaparini (Brazil) Carla Tiene	5–7, 6–4, [11–13]
Win	2	14 September 2008	Santos, Brazil	Clay	(Brazil) Joana Cortez	(Brazil) Ana Clara Duarte (Brazil) Fernanda Hermenegildo	6–1, 6–3
Loss	3	9 November 2008	Asunción, Paraguay	Clay	(Brazil) Nathália Rossi	(Colombia) Karen Castiblanco (Argentina) Emilia Yorio	5–7, 4–6
Win	3	7 December 2008	Fortaleza, Brazil	Hard	(Brazil) Carla Tiene	(Bulgaria) Aleksandrina Naydenova (Brazil) Nathália Rossi	7–6^{(5)}, 6–1
Loss	4	5 April 2009	Lima, Peru	Clay	(Peru) Bianca Botto	(Argentina) Carla Beltrami (Argentina) María Irigoyen	6–4, 3–6, [5–10]
Win	4	27 September 2009	Obregón, Mexico	Hard	(Chile) Andrea Koch Benvenuto	(United States) Jamie Hampton (United States) Whitney Jones	7–6^{(6)}, 6–4
