= György Gattyán =

Hungarian businessman

- Born: György Zoltán Gattyán; Budapest, Hungary
- Education: Kodolányi János University
- Occupations: Businessman, founder and owner of Docler Holding, co-founder of Teqball, vice-president of FITEQ, co-founder of Dogpound
- Political party: Solution Movement
- Website: memo.hu

György Zoltán Gattyán (Note: Hungarian pronunciation: [ˈɟørɟ ˈɡɒccaːn]) is a Hungarian businessman, founder of the adult camming website LiveJasmin. He is the owner of the Docler Group, and also a producer, the co-founder of the Prima Primissima Foundation, the impresario of the Junior Prima Prize Hungarian folk art and community culture and founder of the Docler Holding New Generation Gábor Dénes Award. He decided to relocate the bases and main activities of his companies to abroad: Los Angeles and Luxembourg. In the 2024 Forbes ranking of "The 50 Richest Hungarians," Gattyán, who is ranked 5th, has an estimated wealth of 364.2 billion HUF (approximately 1.7 billion USD).

Docler Holding is a multinational IT and media company created in 2011 and headquartered in Luxembourg with offices in Budapest, Los Angeles, Paris and Hong Kong. The company counts more than 1300 employees worldwide. The group's main profile is developing and operating world-leading websites in the live streaming industry but it has also found or acquired a large number of diversified companies such as Teqball, NetLock, Farvest, Dogpound, Reborn, Escalion, Premium and project like Pitch Your StartUp.

As a candidate for prime minister, his newly formed party ran with high expectations of a two-thirds majority in the 2022 Hungarian parliamentary election, eventually achieving 1%.

== Early life ==
He was born in Budapest. His father worked as a mason and a construction entrepreneur; his mother was a homemaker. He attended the Corvin Mátyás High School and continued his studies at the Faculty of Physical Education and Sport Sciences (later part of Semmelweis University for few years). He trained at the Ikarus Sports Club as a runner; his trainer was István Tomhauser.

== Career ==
György Gattyán created the webcam site LiveJasmin in 2001, providing adult content webcam services. He founded the Docler Holding Enterprise in 2008, which provides various IT and Internet-based services. Based on the technology of LiveJasmin and the benefits of video streaming, he created a site providing online fortune-telling. Docler Holding, including its portfolio companies, has more than 1,300 employees. The latest of his enterprises is the Fashion Palace called Il Bacio di Stile. Having opened its door on 9 September 2013, Il Bacio di Stile was closed shortly after opening with no sign of reopening.

Despite being known for ploughing back of profits in his own enterprises, Napi Gazdaság estimated him the third-richest man in Hungary.

He became the co-producer of the seven-episode TV series The Globetrotting Mouse in 2005. As a result of his co-operation with Kecskemét Film Ltd., he also became co-producer of the last and final eleven episodes of Hungarian Folk Tales in 2010. He also co-produced the animated feature films The Death of Joyous Armenian and The Tree that Reached the Sky. His co-producing work includes work abroad such as the eight-episode TV series World Without End. The series saw great success on U.S. TV channels. The 2013 he was executive producer of the U.S. thriller film Open Grave. Docler Entertainment, part of the Docler Enterprise produces four to five movies each year in Hungary and in the U.S. The movie Six Dance Lessons in Six Weeks was finalized in the summer of 2013 which featured him again as a producer. György Gattyán has been the curator and jury member of several film festivals.

== Party foundation ==
In November 2021, Gattyán announced that he would run for prime minister in the 2022 Hungarian parliamentary election. On 17 December 2021, he founded his own political party, the Megoldás Mozgalom (MEMO). Immediately after the announcement, the opposition political alliance United for Hungary accused him of electoral collusion with Fidesz.

The party founder expected a quality two-thirds victory, not a simple one. In comparison, the success of the parliamentary elections for him and MEMO was that they won 58,929 votes, which was more than 1% (1.04%). This meant that Gattyán's party did not have to repay the state for the money they had received for their campaign. In addition, they were entitled to receive 50-60 million forints per year in budget support for four years until 2026.

== Sports ==
Gattyán's Docler Group is the title sponsor of several sports clubs. Hungary's youngest chess grandmaster, Richárd Rapport, and the world champion sailor, Benjamin Vadnai, are also sponsored by Docler.

Gattyán has also embraced the sporting invention of Gábor Borsányi and Viktor Huszár, teqball, which has been promoted with Ronaldinho, among others. Gattyán founded the International Teqball Federation (FITEQ), which was admitted to membership in 2020 by the Global Association of International Sports Federations (GAISF), the global umbrella organisation for sports federations.

== Philanthropy ==
György Gattyán has been philanthropically active for many years, through the Gattyán Foundation he has distributed hundreds of millions of forints worth of donations to orphanages and children in need. According to a 2021 compilation of the most philanthropic Hungarians, Gattyán is second on the list.

Honorary titles
Preceded by Sándor Csányi	Hungary's richest person 2014–2015	Succeeded by Sándor Csányi
