= International Teqball Federation =

Governing body for teqball

- Fédération Internationale de Teqball
- Abbreviation: FITEQ
- Type: Sports federation
- Location: Budapest, Hungary
- Region served: Worldwide
- Members: 124 member federations
- President: Gábor Borsányi
- Chairman: Viktor Huszár
- Vice president: György Gattyán
- General Secretary: Marius Vizer Jr
- Website: FITEQ.org

The International Teqball Federation (FITEQ, French: Fédération Internationale de Teqball) is the governing body for the sport of teqball and para teqball. FITEQ is responsible for the organisation of teqball's major international tournaments, notably the Teqball World Championships.

FITEQ was founded in March 2017 following the sport's inception in 2014. Headquartered in Budapest, its membership now compromises 124 national federations.

FITEQ is responsible for the governance and management of teqball at the international level; the development and promotion of teqball globally; the codification of the official rules and regulations of teqball; supporting the establishment of National Federations; the education and development of athletes, coaches and technical officials; sanctioning national and international competitions and events; establishing and maintaining world-ranking statistics; and the governance, management and development of para teqball.

== Board ==
The FITEQ Board consists of FITEQ President Gábor Borsányi, who is the inventor of the sport, fellow co-founder and FITEQ vice-president György Gattyán, teqball co-founder and FITEQ Chairman Viktor Huszár, General Secretary Marius Vizer Jr. The management team is led by Sport Director Matthew Curtain.

== Member federations ==
List of Member Federations

There are currently 144 national teqball member federations, across five continents.

Africa (42)	Asia (36)	Europe (31)	Oceania (9)	Pan America (26)
Algeria; Benin; Burkina Faso; Burundi; Cameroon; Cape Verde; Chad; Comoros; Democratic Republic of the Congo; Djibouti; Equatorial Guinea; Eswatini; Gabon; Gambia; Ghana; Guinea; Guinea-Bissau; Ivory Coast; Lesotho; Liberia; Libya; Madagascar; Malawi; Mali; Mauritania; Mauritius; Mozambique; Namibia; Niger; Nigeria; Republic of the Congo; Rwanda; Sao Tome and Principe; Senegal; Seychelles; Sierra Leone; Somalia; South Africa; Togo; Uganda; Zambia; Zimbabwe	Afghanistan; Bahrain; Bhutan; Brunei; Cambodia; Chinese Taipei; East Timor; Hong Kong; India; Indonesia; Iran; Iraq; Japan; Jordan; Kazakhstan; Kuwait; Kyrgyzstan; Laos; Lebanon; Malaysia; Maldives; Mongolia; Myanmar; Nepal; North Korea; Pakistan; Palestine; Philippines; South Korea; Singapore; Sri Lanka; Syria; Tajikistan; Thailand; Turkmenistan; Uzbekistan; Yemen	Albania; Armenia; Belgium; Bulgaria; Croatia; Czech Republic; Estonia; France; Georgia; Germany; Greece; Hungary; Israel; Italy; Kosovo; Latvia; Lithuania; Luxembourg; Malta; Moldova; Monaco; Montenegro; North Macedonia; Norway; Poland; Portugal; Romania; Slovakia; Slovenia; Spain; Switzerland; Ukraine	American Samoa; Australia; Cook Islands; Guam; New Caledonia; Papua New Guinea; Samoa; Tuvalu; Vanuatu	Antigua and Barbuda; Argentina; Bahamas; Belize; Bermuda; Bolivia; Canada; Chile; Colombia; Costa Rica; Cuba; Dominican Republic; Ecuador; El Salvador; Guyana; Honduras; Jamaica; Mexico; Panama; Paraguay; Peru; Saint Kitts and Nevis; Saint Lucia; Trinidad and Tobago; Uruguay; Venezuela

== Competitions ==
=== Teqball World Championships ===
The annual Teqball World Championships (formerly Teqball World Cup) is the flagship teqball competition.

=== Other major teqball events ===
- The Sanya 2020 Asian Beach Games
- 2021 Asian Indoor and Martial Arts Games
- The African Beach Teqball Cup was held on 18 June 2019 during the 1st African Beach Games in Sal, Cape Verde.
- The Asia-Pacific Beach Cup took place in November 2019 as part of the Chinese Corporative Beach Games in Sanya.
- The inaugural Teqball Masters was held from 17 to 19 December 2019 in Riyadh, Saudi Arabia
- The Challenger Cup series began in September 2019 in Balassagyarmat, Hungary
- The National Challenger Series
- The Teqball Grand Prix
- 2023 European Games
- 2025 Asian Youth Games

== Affiliations ==
- Recognised by the Olympic Council of Asia (OCA) in August 2018
- Recognised by the Association of National Olympic Committees of Africa (ANOCA) in June 2019.
- Recognised by Organisation of Sports Federations of Oceania (OSFO)
- Signatory of the United Nations Framework Convention on Climate Change
- Global Association of International Sports Federations (GAISF) Full Member
- Partner of the International Testing Agency
- Partner with the International School Sport Federation (ISF)
- Signatory of the World Anti-Doping (WADA) Code
- Content partner with the Olympic Channel
- Media partner with Eurosport
- Partnership with the Hungarian Paralympic Committee (MPB)
- Recognised and endorsed by TAFISA
