= Teqball =

Sport played with a football over a curved table

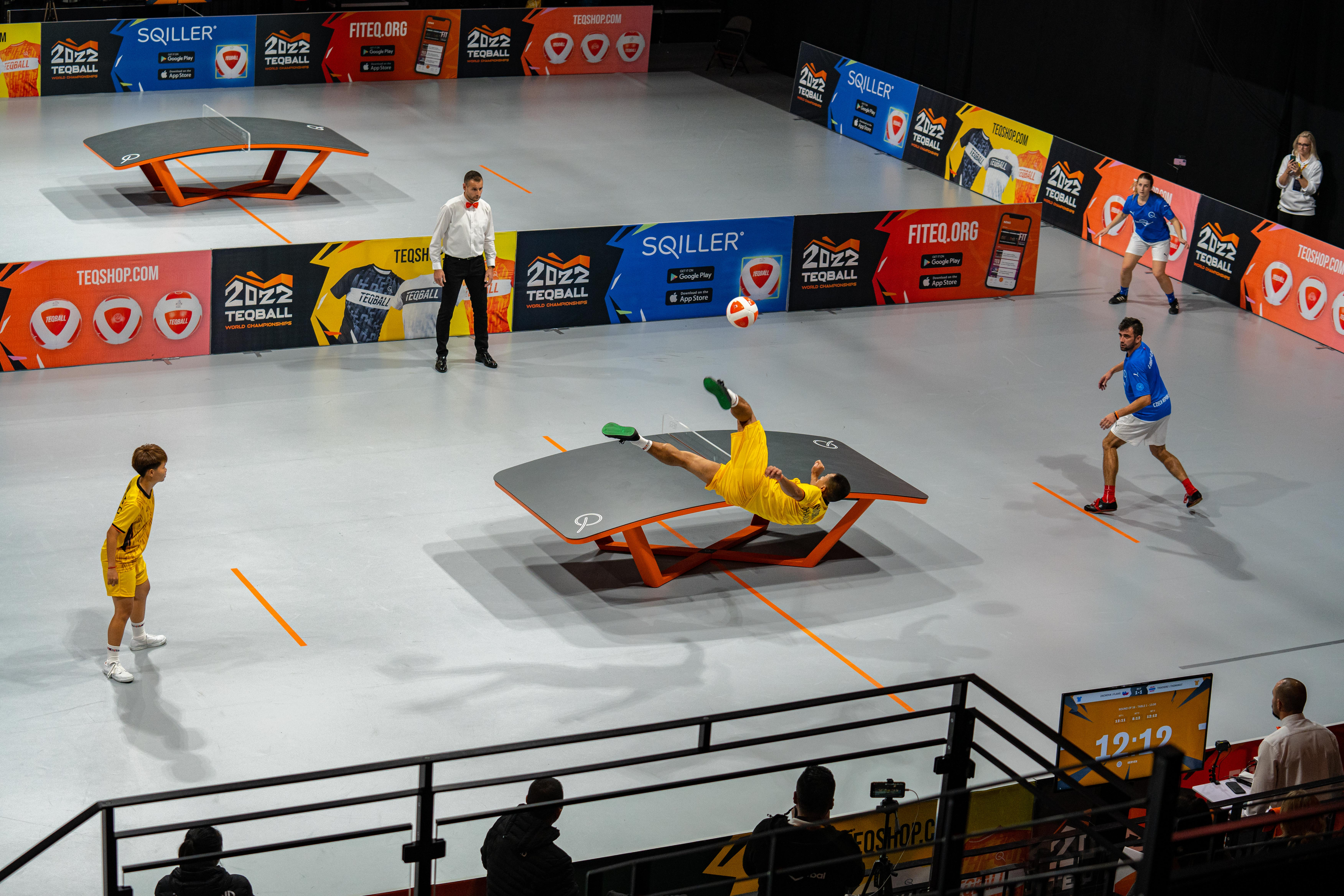
- Highest governing body: FITEQ
- First played: 2014 in Hungary

Characteristics
- Contact: No
- Team members: singles, doubles, mixed doubles
- Type: indoor, outdoor
- Equipment: Ball (association football), teqball table

Teqball is a proprietary ball sport that is played on a curved table, combining elements of football and table tennis. Back and forth, the players hit a ball with any part of the body except arms and hands. Teqball can be played between two players as a singles game or between four players as a doubles game. The game is represented at an international level by the International Teqball Federation (FITEQ). A number of world-class footballers have been attracted by the game, and after being added to the programmes for the 2021 Asian Beach Games and the 2023 European Games, the sport is now aiming for Olympic inclusion.

Teqball became the world's fastest-recognised sport in August 2018, when its highest governing body, FITEQ, was officially recognised by the Olympic Committee of Asia (OCA). In June 2019, it was officially recognised by the Association of National Olympic Committees of Africa (ANOCA).

In November 2020, FITEQ was granted full membership of the Global Association of International Sports Federations (GAISF).

== History ==
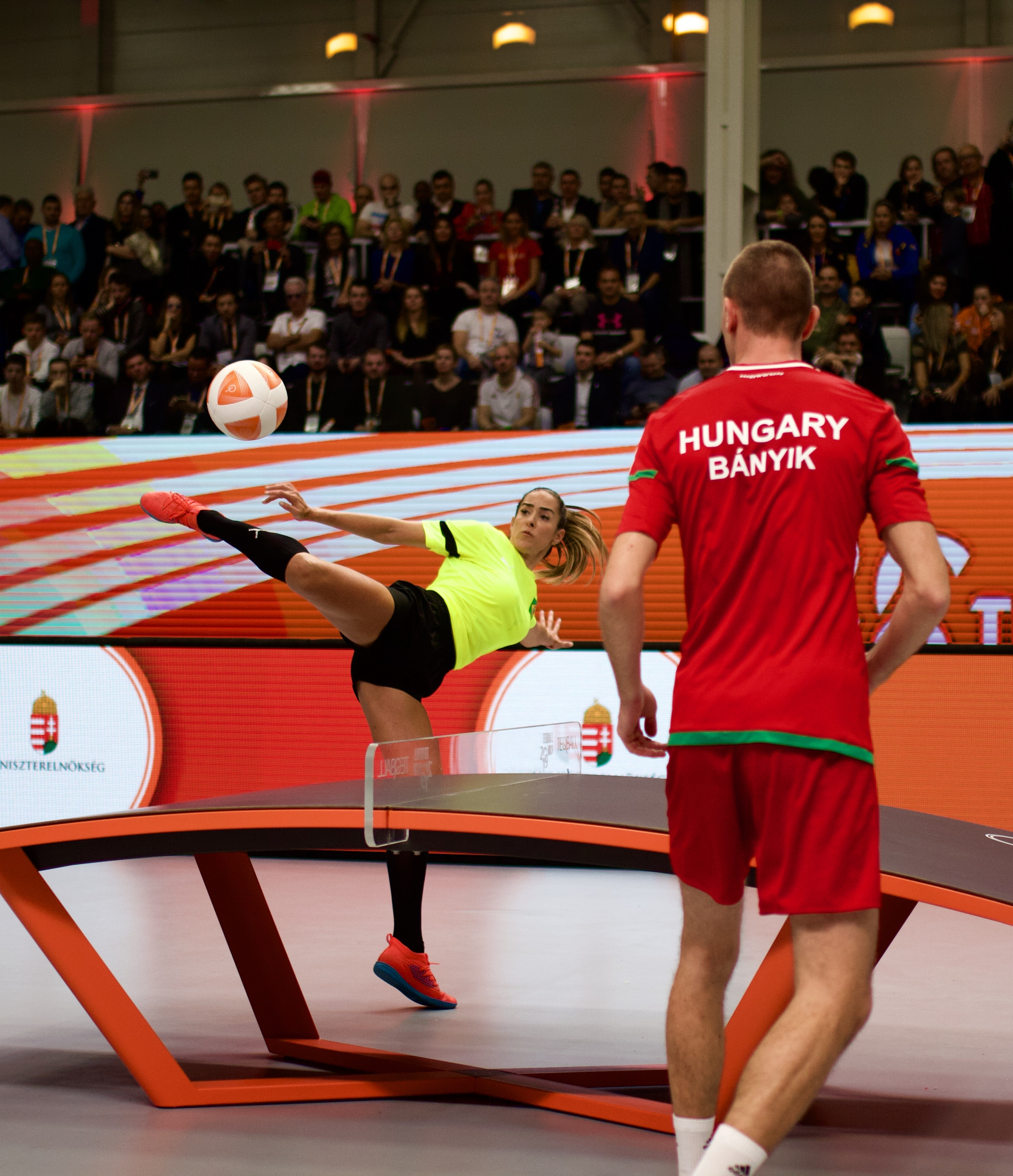

Teqball was invented in 2014 in Hungary by three football enthusiasts: former professional player Gábor Borsányi, sex industry and political entrepreneur György Gattyán, and computer scientist Viktor Huszár. The creative idea came from Borsányi, who used to play football on a table tennis table. The horizontal design of the table made the ball often not bounce to the players, so this game was not enjoyable. Borsányi thought that if the table were bent, the arched surface could help the ball bounce to the foot. After several years of development with Huszár, the first teqball table was made in 2014.

According to Murányi Gergely of FITEQ, "We called it teqball because you need technique to play the game and you play it with a regular soccer ball".

The sport was officially presented in Budapest on 18 October 2016, by Brazilian ex-football player Ronaldinho, one of the ambassadors of teqball.

== Rules ==
The rules are laid out in the FITEQ's set of rules.

=== Summary ===
- The official sport can be played with balls used in football, with size five being official and recommended.
- It can be played by two players (singles game) or by four players (doubles game).
- A match consists of best-of-three sets.
- Each set is played until a player/team reaches 12 points.
- Every player/team has two attempts to complete a successful service.
- The players/teams change service after each four points.
- It is forbidden to touch the ball with the same body part twice consecutively
- It is forbidden to return the ball with the same body part twice consecutively.
- Every player/team is allowed to return the ball with a maximum of 3 touches by any body part, except for the hands and arms.
- In doubles, a team has a maximum of 3 touches; however, the teammates must pass the ball at least once to each other.
- While playing, neither the TEQTM table nor the opponent can be touched.
- In case of an edgeball, the rally shall be repeated.

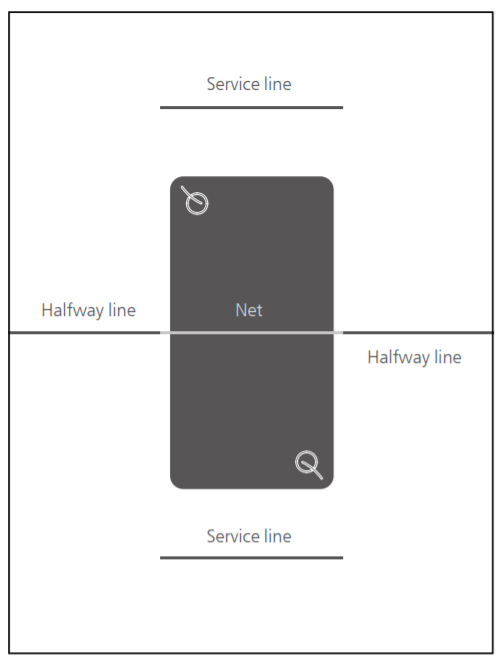
Teqball court from the top

=== Playing court ===
The official competition size of a teqball court is a minimum of 12 metres (39 ft) wide by a minimum of 16 metres (52 ft) long by a minimum of 7 metres (23 ft) high. The court must be rectangular and marked with surrounds with a minimum height of 500 mm (20 in) and a maximum height of 1,500 mm (59 in). The Teq table is in the exact middle of the court with the net being parallel to the shorter sides’ perimeters.

=== Teq table ===
The curved table measures 3 metres (9.8 ft) in length and is 1.7 m (5 ft 7 in) wide with the highest point at 0.76 m (2 ft 6 in) in the middle of the playing surface where the net with the height of 14 cm (5.5 in) is installed separating the surface into two parts. The two outer edges of the width are 56.5 cm (22.2 in) above the ground.

=== Ball ===
The ball is spherical and must be made of leather or another suitable material and has a latex bladder with a butyl valve. The ball is a regular size-5 football, but kept at a lower pressure [between 0.3 and 0.5 atm (30 and 51 kPa; 4.4 and 7.3 psi)] than it would be for football.

== Intellectual property ==
Unlike equipment in traditional sports, the design of the teqball table is patented, so only Teqball International or others with a license from Teqball Holding SARL may legally manufacture tables. The name "teqball" itself is trademarked, giving the trademark holder control over who may advertise teqball events. The teqball inventors view these legal restrictions as essential to their efforts to grow the sport.

== Competitions ==
=== Teqball World Championships ===
The Teqball World Championships is an annual competition organised by FITEQ since 2017.

The Teqball World Championships has both Singles and Doubles competitions as well as Mixed Doubles. The first Teqball World Championships was held in Budapest, Hungary in 2017 with more than 20 participating nations. The 2018 version of the event was held from 12 to 13 October in Reims, France with a total of 90 players participating.

The 2019 Teqball World Championships took place from 6–8 December in Budapest. Around 160 athletes representing 58 countries competed across singles, doubles and mixed doubles events.

FITEQ has taken the decision to postpone the 2020 Teqball World Championships due to the ongoing uncertainty and restrictions related to the COVID-19 pandemic.

2023 Teqball World Championships was organized outside Europe, for the first time, in Bangkok, Thailand.

=== African Beach Games ===
Teqball was included in the first African Beach Games in Sal, Cape Verde on 14–23 July 2019. Cameroon won the title by beating Nigeria in the final.

=== Asian Beach Games & Asian Indoor and Martial Arts Games (AIMAG) ===
As a sport that is officially recognised by the Olympic Council of Asia (OCA), teqball was added to the programme for the Sanya 2020, but The Olympic Council of Asia (OCA) has postponed the Sanya Asian Beach Games, which was due to take place from 2–10 April 2021, as well as the Bangkok and Chonburi Asian Indoor and Martial Arts Games (AIMAG), which was scheduled for 21–30 May 2021. The decisions were taken by the OCA Executive Board in light of the ongoing challenges with the COVID-19 pandemic.

The OCA, the National Olympic Committee of Thailand and the AIMAG 2021 Organising Committee have agreed that the event, in which teqball will be a demonstration sport, will now be held from 10 to 20 March 2022. The OCA has noted that it will continue its consultation with the Chinese Olympic Committee and the Sanya Asian Beach Games Organising Committee to agree a new date for the 6th Asian Beach Games, where teqball is set to make its debut as a medal sport.

=== Asian Teqball Tour ===
1st Teqball World Series in Asia was held in 2024.

=== European Games ===
The European Olympic Committees (EOC) announced an agreement with FITEQ to include teqball for the first time in the programme of the European Games in 2023.

=== European Championships ===
1st European Teqball Championships, four events was held in 2022 in Poland.

== Ranking system ==
FITEQ has World Rankings for singles, doubles and mixed doubles, based on World Ranking points attained in official FITEQ events. FITEQ publishes regular updates to its World Rankings, which are used to determine the seeding of players into tournaments.

== Awards ==
Red Dot Design Award

- 2015 – Teq Smart
- 2020 – Teq Lite

ISPO Award 2015, 2016

IF Design Award 2018 – Teq Smart

Hungarian Design Award 2019 – Teq Smart

== See also ==
- Footvolley
- Sepak takraw
- Volleyball
