= 2019 World Rowing Championships – Men's lightweight double sculls =

Men's lightweight double sculls at the 2019 World Rowing Championships
- Venue: Linz-Ottensheim
- Location: Ottensheim, Austria
- Dates: 25–31 August
- Competitors: 64 from 32 nations
- Winning time: 6:37.28

Medalists
gold medal	Fintan McCarthy; Paul O'Donovan	Ireland
silver medal	Stefano Oppo; Pietro Ruta	Italy
bronze medal	Jonathan Rommelmann; Jason Osborne	Germany

The men's lightweight double sculls competition at the 2019 World Rowing Championships took place at the Linz-Ottensheim regatta venue. A top-seven finish ensured qualification for the Tokyo Olympics.

== Schedule ==
The schedule was as follows:

Date	Time	Round
Sunday 25 August 2019	10:56	Heats
Monday 26 August 2019	12:17	Repechages
Wednesday 28 August 2019	11:37	Quarterfinals
Wednesday 28 August 2019	16:58	Semifinals E/F
Thursday 29 August 2019	10:42	Semifinals A/B
Thursday 29 August 2019	16:30	Semifinals C/D
Thursday 29 August 2019	17:10	Final F
Thursday 29 August 2019	17:25	Final E
Saturday 31 August 2019	09:45	Final D
Sunday 1 September 2019	10:03	Final C
Sunday 1 September 2019	11:24	Final B
Sunday 1 September 2019	13:54	Final A

All times are Central European Summer Time (UTC+2)

== Results ==
=== Heats ===
The three fastest boats in each heat advanced directly to the quarterfinals. The remaining boats were sent to the repechages.

==== Heat 1 ====
Rank	Rowers	Country	Time	Notes
1	Stefano Oppo; Pietro Ruta	Italy	6:30.61	Q
2	Pierre Houin; Hugo Beurey	France	6:32.64	Q
3	Ihor Khmara; Stanislav Kovalov	Ukraine	6:34.78	Q
4	Bayram Sönmez; Enes Yenipazarlı	Turkey	6:42.03	R
5	Aleksandr Bogdashin; Alexandr Tufanyuk	Russia	6:49.76	R
6	Edgar Ilas; Cris Nievarez	Philippines	7:03.68	R

==== Heat 2 ====
Rank	Rowers	Country	Time	Notes
1	Jiří Šimánek; Miroslav Vraštil Jr.	Czech Republic	6:29.21	Q
2	Rodrigo Conde; Manel Balastegui	Spain	6:31.55	Q
3	Sun Man; Fan Junjie	China	6:31.58	Q
4	Kristoffer Brun; Are Strandli	Norway	6:46.22	R
5	Chan Chi-fung; Wong Wai-chun	Hong Kong	6:49.77	R
6	Evgeniy Agafonov; Shakhzod Nurmatov	Uzbekistan	6:52.65	R

==== Heat 3 ====
Rank	Rowers	Country	Time	Notes
1	Fintan McCarthy; Paul O'Donovan	Ireland	6:28.02	Q
2	Andri Struzina; Fiorin Rüedi	Switzerland	6:31.76	Q
3	Emil Espensen; Alexander Modest	Denmark	6:34.01	Q
4	Yuki Ikeda; Mitsuo Nishimura	Japan	6:41.66	R
5	Arvind Singh; Bhagwan Singh	India	6:48.09	R

==== Heat 4 ====
Rank	Rowers	Country	Time	Notes
1	Tim Brys; Niels Van Zandweghe	Belgium	6:28.46	Q
2	Patrick Keane; Maxwell Lattimer	Canada	6:29.80	Q
3	Julian Schöberl; Matthias Taborsky	Austria	6:32.18	Q
4	Peter Zelinka; Marek Reznak	Slovakia	6:34.68	R
5	Marjan Nikolovski; Marjan Vlakjeski	North Macedonia	7:41.77	R

==== Heat 5 ====
Rank	Rowers	Country	Time	Notes
1	Jonathan Rommelmann; Jason Osborne	Germany	6:24.25	Q
2	Pedro Fraga; Afonso Costa	Portugal	6:24.90	Q
3	Jerzy Kowalski; Artur Mikołajczewski	Poland	6:26.90	Q
4	Andrew Campbell; Nicholas Trojan	United States	6:32.84	R
5	Yevgeniy Tatsei; Daniil Savchenko	Kazakhstan	7:00.59	R

==== Heat 6 ====
Rank	Rowers	Country	Time	Notes
1	Matthew Dunham; Harrison Somerville	New Zealand	6:28.94	Q
2	Hamish Parry; Leon Chambers	Australia	6:31.02	Q
3	Jamie Copus; Zak Lee-Green	Great Britain	6:36.31	Q
4	Petros Gkaidatzis; Antonios Papakonstantinou	Greece	6:51.27	R
5	Mohamed Kota; Ahmed Abdelaal	Egypt	6:55.12	R

=== Repechages ===
The two fastest boats in each repechage advanced to the quarterfinals. The remaining boats were sent to the E/F semifinals.

==== Repechage 1 ====
Rank	Rowers	Country	Time	Notes
1	Bayram Sönmez; Enes Yenipazarlı	Turkey	6:38.48	Q
2	Petros Gkaidatzis; Antonios Papakonstantinou	Greece	6:40.69	Q
3	Arvind Singh; Bhagwan Singh	India	6:44.98	SE/F
4	Evgeniy Agafonov; Shakhzod Nurmatov	Uzbekistan	6:45.99	SE/F
5	Yevgeniy Tatsei; Daniil Savchenko	Kazakhstan	7:00.35	SE/F

==== Repechage 2 ====
Rank	Rowers	Country	Time	Notes
1	Kristoffer Brun; Are Strandli	Norway	6:33.19	Q
2	Peter Zelinka; Marek Reznak	Slovakia	6:44.05	Q
3	Aleksandr Bogdashin; Alexandr Tufanyuk	Russia	6:46.18	SE/F
4	Mohamed Kota; Ahmed Abdelaal	Egypt	6:58.79	SE/F

==== Repechage 3 ====
Rank	Rowers	Country	Time	Notes
1	Andrew Campbell; Nicholas Trojan	United States	6:38.17	Q
2	Yuki Ikeda; Mitsuo Nishimura	Japan	6:41.03	Q
3	Chan Chi-fung; Wong Wai-chun	Hong Kong	6:51.85	SE/F
4	Edgar Ilas; Cris Nievarez	Philippines	6:58.41	SE/F
5	Marjan Nikolovski; Marjan Vlakjeski	North Macedonia	7:33.49	SE/F

=== Quarterfinals ===
The three fastest boats in each quarter advanced to the A/B semifinals. The remaining boats were sent to the C/D semifinals.

==== Quarterfinal 1 ====
Rank	Rowers	Country	Time	Notes
1	Stefano Oppo; Pietro Ruta	Italy	6:19.35	SA/B
2	Kristoffer Brun; Are Strandli	Norway	6:19.83	SA/B
3	Matthew Dunham; Harrison Somerville	New Zealand	6:20.43	SA/B
4	Pedro Fraga; Afonso Costa	Portugal	6:21.05	SC/D
5	Julian Schöberl; Matthias Taborsky	Austria	6:33.69	SC/D
6	Yuki Ikeda; Mitsuo Nishimura	Japan	6:34.81	SC/D

==== Quarterfinal 2 ====
Rank	Rowers	Country	Time	Notes
1	Jonathan Rommelmann; Jason Osborne	Germany	6:19.54	SA/B
2	Jiří Šimánek; Miroslav Vraštil Jr.	Czech Republic	6:20.94	SA/B
3	Patrick Keane; Maxwell Lattimer	Canada	6:21.79	SA/B
4	Emil Espensen; Alexander Modest	Denmark	6:22.29	SC/D
5	Andrew Campbell; Nicholas Trojan	United States	6:25.46	SC/D
6	Petros Gkaidatzis; Antonios Papakonstantinou	Greece	6:39.49	SC/D

==== Quarterfinal 3 ====
Rank	Rowers	Country	Time	Notes
1	Fintan McCarthy; Paul O'Donovan	Ireland	6:20.84	SA/B
2	Rodrigo Conde; Manel Balastegui	Spain	6:22.84	SA/B
3	Jerzy Kowalski; Artur Mikołajczewski	Poland	6:23.72	SA/B
4	Jamie Copus; Zak Lee-Green	Great Britain	6:28.43	SC/D
5	Pierre Houin; Hugo Beurey	France	6:29.48	SC/D
6	Bayram Sönmez; Enes Yenipazarlı	Turkey	6:36.37	SC/D

==== Quarterfinal 4 ====
Rank	Rowers	Country	Time	Notes
1	Sun Man; Fan Junjie	China	6:25.11	SA/B
2	Tim Brys; Niels Van Zandweghe	Belgium	6:26.12	SA/B
3	Hamish Parry; Leon Chambers	Australia	6:26.96	SA/B
4	Andri Struzina; Fiorin Rüedi	Switzerland	6:27.49	SC/D
5	Ihor Khmara; Stanislav Kovalov	Ukraine	6:31.31	SC/D
6	Peter Zelinka; Marek Reznak	Slovakia	6:31.36	SC/D

=== Semifinals E/F ===
The three fastest boats in each semi were sent to the E final. The remaining boats were sent to the F final.

==== Semifinal 1 ====
Rank	Rowers	Country	Time	Notes
1	Aleksandr Bogdashin; Alexandr Tufanyuk	Russia	6:36.42	FE
2	Arvind Singh; Bhagwan Singh	India	6:41.34	FE
3	Yevgeniy Tatsei; Daniil Savchenko	Kazakhstan	6:43.75	FE
4	Edgar Ilas; Cris Nievarez	Philippines	6:46.70	FF

==== Semifinal 2 ====
Rank	Rowers	Country	Time	Notes
1	Evgeniy Agafonov; Shakhzod Nurmatov	Uzbekistan	6:38.97	FE
2	Chan Chi-fung; Wong Wai-chun	Hong Kong	6:40.92	FE
3	Mohamed Kota; Ahmed Abdelaal	Egypt	6:51.28	FE
4	Marjan Nikolovski; Marjan Vlakjeski	North Macedonia	7:44.26	FF

=== Semifinals C/D ===
The three fastest boats in each semi advanced to the C final. The remaining boats were sent to the D final.

==== Semifinal 1 ====
Rank	Rowers	Country	Time	Notes
1	Pedro Fraga; Afonso Costa	Portugal	6:16.71	FC
2	Emil Espensen; Alexander Modest	Denmark	6:17.56	FC
3	Pierre Houin; Hugo Beurey	France	6:18.10	FC
4	Ihor Khmara; Stanislav Kovalov	Ukraine	6:19.57	FD
5	Bayram Sönmez; Enes Yenipazarlı	Turkey	6:24.04	FD
6	Yuki Ikeda; Mitsuo Nishimura	Japan	6:25.89	FD

==== Semifinal 2 ====
Rank	Rowers	Country	Time	Notes
1	Andrew Campbell; Nicholas Trojan	United States	6:17.40	FC
2	Julian Schöberl; Matthias Taborsky	Austria	6:18.00	FC
3	Jamie Copus; Zak Lee-Green	Great Britain	6:18.73	FC
4	Andri Struzina; Fiorin Rüedi	Switzerland	6:21.10	FD
5	Petros Gkaidatzis; Antonios Papakonstantinou	Greece	6:21.89	FD
6	Peter Zelinka; Marek Reznak	Slovakia	6:30.67	FD

=== Semifinals A/B ===
The three fastest boats in each semi advanced to the A final. The remaining boats were sent to the B final.

==== Semifinal 1 ====
Rank	Rowers	Country	Time	Notes
1	Stefano Oppo; Pietro Ruta	Italy	6:13.30	FA
2	Rodrigo Conde; Manel Balastegui	Spain	6:13.68	FA
3	Jerzy Kowalski; Artur Mikołajczewski	Poland	6:14.15	FA
4	Sun Man; Fan Junjie	China	6:14.87	FB
5	Jiří Šimánek; Miroslav Vraštil Jr.	Czech Republic	6:15.64	FB
6	Matthew Dunham; Harrison Somerville	New Zealand	6:18.78	FB

==== Semifinal 2 ====
Rank	Rowers	Country	Time	Notes
1	Fintan McCarthy; Paul O'Donovan	Ireland	6:13.46	FA
2	Jonathan Rommelmann; Jason Osborne	Germany	6:13.59	FA
3	Kristoffer Brun; Are Strandli	Norway	6:14.15	FA
4	Tim Brys; Niels Van Zandweghe	Belgium	6:17.06	FB
5	Hamish Parry; Leon Chambers	Australia	6:18.00	FB
6	Patrick Keane; Maxwell Lattimer	Canada	6:20.34	FB

=== Finals ===
The A final determined the rankings for places 1 to 6. Additional rankings were determined in the other finals.

==== Final F ====
Rank	Rowers	Country	Time
1	Edgar Ilas; Cris Nievarez	Philippines	6:41.20
2	Marjan Nikolovski; Marjan Vlakjeski	North Macedonia	7:18.08

==== Final E ====
Rank	Rowers	Country	Time
1	Aleksandr Bogdashin; Alexandr Tufanyuk	Russia	6:27.97
2	Chan Chi-fung; Wong Wai-chun	Hong Kong	6:29.56
3	Arvind Singh; Bhagwan Singh	India	6:32.38
4	Evgeniy Agafonov; Shakhzod Nurmatov	Uzbekistan	6:34.51
5	Yevgeniy Tatsei; Daniil Savchenko	Kazakhstan	6:35.49
6	Mohamed Kota; Ahmed Abdelaal	Egypt	6:39.46

==== Final D ====
Rank	Rowers	Country	Time
1	Andri Struzina; Fiorin Rüedi	Switzerland	6:29.56
2	Ihor Khmara; Stanislav Kovalov	Ukraine	6:29.85
3	Bayram Sönmez; Enes Yenipazarlı	Turkey	6:32.79
4	Petros Gkaidatzis; Antonios Papakonstantinou	Greece	6:34.84
5	Peter Zelinka; Marek Reznak	Slovakia	6:35.29
6	Yuki Ikeda; Mitsuo Nishimura	Japan	6:37.64

==== Final C ====
Rank	Rowers	Country	Time
1	Julian Schöberl; Matthias Taborsky	Austria	6:21.13
2	Pedro Fraga; Afonso Costa	Portugal	6:22.43
3	Andrew Campbell; Nicholas Trojan	United States	6:22.69
4	Pierre Houin; Hugo Beurey	France	6:23.16
5	Emil Espensen; Alexander Modest	Denmark	6:24.03
6	Jamie Copus; Zak Lee-Green	Great Britain	6:26.61

==== Final B ====
Rank	Rowers	Country	Time
1	Tim Brys; Niels Van Zandweghe	Belgium	6:30.74
2	Hamish Parry; Leon Chambers	Australia	6:32.98
3	Patrick Keane; Maxwell Lattimer	Canada	6:33.19
4	Jiří Šimánek; Miroslav Vraštil Jr.	Czech Republic	6:37.82
5	Matthew Dunham; Harrison Somerville	New Zealand	6:38.89
6	Sun Man; Fan Junjie	China	6:41.28

==== Final A ====
Rank	Rowers	Country	Time
1st place, gold medalist(s)	Fintan McCarthy; Paul O'Donovan	Ireland	6:37.28
2nd place, silver medalist(s)	Stefano Oppo; Pietro Ruta	Italy	6:39.71
3rd place, bronze medalist(s)	Jonathan Rommelmann; Jason Osborne	Germany	6:41.07
4	Kristoffer Brun; Are Strandli	Norway	6:44.07
5	Rodrigo Conde; Manel Balastegui	Spain	6:48.75
6	Jerzy Kowalski; Artur Mikołajczewski	Poland	6:49.86
