= 2018 World Rowing Championships – Men's lightweight double sculls =

Men's lightweight double sculls at the 2018 World Rowing Championships
- Venue: Plovdiv Regatta Venue
- Location: Plovdiv, Bulgaria
- Dates: 9–15 September
- Competitors: 53 from 26 nations
- Winning time: 6:06.81

Medalists
gold medal	Gary O'Donovan; Paul O'Donovan	Ireland
silver medal	Stefano Oppo; Pietro Ruta	Italy
bronze medal	Tim Brys; Niels Van Zandweghe	Belgium

The men's lightweight double sculls competition at the 2018 World Rowing Championships in Plovdiv took place at the Plovdiv Regatta Venue.

== Schedule ==
The schedule was as follows:

Date	Time	Round
Sunday 9 September 2018	15:32	Heats
Monday 10 September 2018	12:33	Repechage
Wednesday 12 September 2018	15:02	Quarterfinals
Thursday 13 September 2018	11:54	Semifinals A/B
Thursday 13 September 2018	15:17	Semifinals C/D
Saturday 15 September 2018	10:02	Final B
Saturday 15 September 2018	12:16	Final A
Saturday 15 September 2018	15:09	Final C
Saturday 15 September 2018	15:57	Final D
Saturday 15 September 2018	16:37	Final E

All times are Eastern European Summer Time (UTC+3)

== Results ==
=== Heats ===
The four fastest boats in each heat advanced directly to the quarterfinals. The remaining boats were sent to the repechage.

==== Heat 1 ====
Rank	Rower	Country	Time	Notes
1	Stefano Oppo; Pietro Ruta	Italy	6:14.95	Q
2	Zhang Zhiyuan; Chen Sensen	China	6:16.78	Q
3	Jiří Šimánek; Miroslav Vraštil Jr.	Czech Republic	6:17.03	Q
4	Benjamin van Dalen; Matthew Dunham	New Zealand	6:18.01	Q
5	César Abaroa; Eber Sanbueza	Chile	6:20.02	R
6	Thomas Baroukh; Pierre Houin	France	6:21.52	R

==== Heat 2 ====
Rank	Rower	Country	Time	Notes
1	Patrick Keane; Maxwell Lattimer	Canada	6:21.33	Q
2	Zak Lee-Green; Jamie Copus	Great Britain	6:23.27	Q
3	Emil Espensen; Alexander Modest	Denmark	6:24.23	Q
4	Kakeru Sato; Mitsuo Nishimura	Japan	6:31.01	Q
5	Aleksandr Bogdashin; Nikita Bolozin	Russia	6:40.84	R

==== Heat 3 ====
Rank	Rower	Country	Time	Notes
1	Kristoffer Brun; Are Strandli	Norway	6:24.68	Q
2	Marek Reznak; Peter Zelinka	Slovakia	6:26.49	Q
3	Vaughn Botes; Nicholas Oberholzer	South Africa	6:26.96	Q
4	Ihor Khmara; Stanislav Kovalov	Ukraine	6:28.18	Q
5	Hugh McAdam; Peter Schmidt	United States	6:37.28	R

==== Heat 4 ====
Rank	Rower	Country	Time	Notes
1	Jerzy Kowalski; Miłosz Jankowski	Poland	6:19.48	Q
2	Tim Brys; Niels Van Zandweghe	Belgium	6:20.13	Q
3	Julian Müller; Andri Struzina	Switzerland	6:21.23	Q
4	Julian Schöberl; Paul Sieber	Austria	6:23.14	Q
5	Patricio Rojas; Rodrigo Comero	Spain	6:26.03	R

==== Heat 5 ====
Rank	Rower	Country	Time	Notes
1	Gary O'Donovan; Paul O'Donovan	Ireland	6:15.79	Q
2	Jonathan Rommelmann; Konstantin Steinhübel	Germany	6:19.23	Q
3	Pedro Fraga; Afonso Costa	Portugal	6:21.55	Q
4	Alejandro Colomino; Carlo Lauro	Argentina	6:30.24	Q
5	Petros Gkaidatzis; Ninos Nikolaidis	Greece	6:39.53	R

=== Repechage ===
The four fastest boats advanced to the quarterfinals. The remaining boats were sent to the E final.

Rank	Rower	Country	Time	Notes
1	Patricio Rojas; Rodrigo Comero	Spain	6:20.61	Q
2	Thomas Baroukh; Pierre Houin	France	6:21.32	Q
3	Petros Gkaidatzis; Ninos Nikolaidis	Greece	6:22.57	Q
4	César Abaroa; Eber Sanbueza	Chile	6:23.04	Q
5	Aleksandr Bogdashin; Nikita Bolozin	Russia	6:30.68	FE
6	Hugh McAdam; Peter Schmidt	United States	6:31.40	FE

=== Quarterfinals ===
The three fastest boats in each quarter advanced to the A/B semifinals. The remaining boats were sent to the C/D semifinals.

==== Quarterfinal 1 ====
Rank	Rower	Country	Time	Notes
1	Julian Schöberl; Paul Sieber	Austria	6:49.04	SA/B
2	Stefano Oppo; Pietro Ruta	Italy	6:49.96	SA/B
3	Zak Lee-Green; Jamie Copus	Great Britain	6:52.27	SA/B
4	Jonathan Rommelmann; Konstantin Steinhübel	Germany	6:56.96	SC/D
5	Vaughn Botes; Nicholas Oberholzer	South Africa	7:25.99	SC/D
6	Petros Gkaidatzis; Ninos Nikolaidis	Greece	7:31.47	SC/D

==== Quarterfinal 2 ====
Rank	Rower	Country	Time	Notes
1	Patricio Rojas; Rodrigo Comero	Spain	6:54.76	SA/B
2	Ihor Khmara; Stanislav Kovalov	Ukraine	6:56.58	SA/B
3	Tim Brys; Niels Van Zandweghe	Belgium	7:02.88	SA/B
4	Zhang Zhiyuan; Chen Sensen	China	7:06.36	SC/D
5	Patrick Keane; Maxwell Lattimer	Canada	7:08.56	SC/D
6	Alejandro Colomino; Carlo Lauro	Argentina	7:31.35	SC/D

==== Quarterfinal 3 ====
Rank	Rower	Country	Time	Notes
1	Gary O'Donovan; Paul O'Donovan	Ireland	6:44.44	SA/B
2	Benjamin van Dalen; Matthew Dunham	New Zealand	6:45.04	SA/B
3	Kristoffer Brun; Are Strandli	Norway	6:48.70	SA/B
4	Julian Müller; Andri Struzina	Switzerland	6:54.88	SC/D
5	Emil Espensen; Alexander Modest	Denmark	6:59.36	SC/D
6	César Abaroa; Eber Sanbueza	Chile	7:11.47	SC/D

==== Quarterfinal 4 ====
Rank	Rower	Country	Time	Notes
1	Jiří Šimánek; Miroslav Vraštil Jr.	Czech Republic	6:49.45	SA/B
2	Kakeru Sato; Mitsuo Nishimura	Japan	6:50.54	SA/B
3	Jerzy Kowalski; Miłosz Jankowski	Poland	6:51.68	SA/B
4	Marek Reznak; Peter Zelinka	Slovakia	6:53.16	SC/D
5	Thomas Baroukh; Pierre Houin	France	7:06.12	SC/D
6	Pedro Fraga; Afonso Costa	Portugal	7:16.31	SC/D

=== Semifinals C/D ===
The three fastest boats in each semi were sent to the C final. The remaining boats were sent to the D final.

==== Semifinal 1 ====
Rank	Rowers	Country	Time	Notes
1	Jonathan Rommelmann; Konstantin Steinhübel	Germany	6:24.82	FC
2	Emil Espensen; Alexander Modest	Denmark	6:27.07	FC
3	Thomas Baroukh; Pierre Houin	France	6:27.19	FC
4	Zhang Zhiyuan; Chen Sensen	China	6:28.89	FD
5	Petros Gkaidatzis; Ninos Nikolaidis	Greece	6:33.19	FD
6	César Abaroa; Eber Sanbueza	Chile	6:35.74	FD

==== Semifinal 2 ====
Rank	Rowers	Country	Time	Notes
1	Patrick Keane; Maxwell Lattimer	Canada	6:28.55	FC
2	Julian Müller; Andri Struzina	Switzerland	6:29.68	FC
3	Pedro Fraga; Afonso Costa	Portugal	6:29.97	FC
4	Marek Reznak; Peter Zelinka	Slovakia	6:30.89	FD
5	Vaughn Botes; Nicholas Oberholzer	South Africa	6:37.40	FD
6	Pedro Fraga; Afonso Costa	Portugal	6:50.14	FD

=== Semifinals A/B ===
The three fastest boats in each semi advanced to the A final. The remaining boats were sent to the B final.

==== Semifinal 1 ====
Rank	Rowers	Country	Time	Notes
1	Kristoffer Brun; Are Strandli	Norway	6:23.70	FA
2	Benjamin van Dalen; Matthew Dunham	New Zealand	6:26.53	FA
3	Patricio Rojas; Rodrigo Comero	Spain	6:27.12	FA
4	Zak Lee-Green; Jamie Copus	Great Britain	6:28.98	FB
5	Julian Schöberl; Paul Sieber	Austria	6:34.99	FB
6	Kakeru Sato; Mitsuo Nishimura	Japan	6:41.93	FB

==== Semifinal 2 ====
Rank	Rowers	Country	Time	Notes
1	Stefano Oppo; Pietro Ruta	Italy	6:21.94	FA
2	Tim Brys; Niels Van Zandweghe	Belgium	6:22.83	FA
3	Gary O'Donovan; Paul O'Donovan	Ireland	6:23.78	FA
4	Jerzy Kowalski; Miłosz Jankowski	Poland	6:25.30	FB
5	Ihor Khmara; Stanislav Kovalov	Ukraine	6:31.37	FB
6	Jiří Šimánek; Miroslav Vraštil Jr.	Czech Republic	6:31.53	FB

=== Finals ===
The A final determined the rankings for places 1 to 6. Additional rankings were determined in the other finals.

==== Final E ====
Rank	Rowers	Country	Time
1	Hugh McAdam; Peter Schmidt	United States	6:28.65
2	Nikita Bolozin; Aleksandr Bogdashin	Russia	6:30.06

==== Final D ====
Rank	Rowers	Country	Time
1	Marek Reznak; Peter Zelinka	Slovakia	6:17.88
2	César Abaroa; Eber Sanbueza	Chile	6:17.92
3	Alejandro Colomino; Carlo Lauro	Argentina	6:18.74
4	Zhang Zhiyuan; Chen Sensen	China	6:19.28
5	Vaughn Botes; Nicholas Oberholzer	South Africa	6:21.57
6	Petros Gkaidatzis; Ninos Nikolaidis	Greece	6:32.25

==== Final C ====
Rank	Rowers	Country	Time
1	Thomas Baroukh; Pierre Houin	France	6:08.84
2	Jonathan Rommelmann; Konstantin Steinhübel	Germany	6:10.10
3	Patrick Keane; Maxwell Lattimer	Canada	6:10.70
4	Emil Espensen; Alexander Modest	Denmark	6:12.34
5	Julian Müller; Andri Struzina	Switzerland	6:14.25
6	Pedro Fraga; Afonso Costa	Portugal	6:14.56

==== Final B ====
Rank	Rowers	Country	Time
1	Jiří Šimánek; Miroslav Vraštil Jr.	Czech Republic	6:20.93
2	Jerzy Kowalski; Miłosz Jankowski	Poland	6:23.10
3	Zak Lee-Green; Jamie Copus	Great Britain	6:24.96
4	Ihor Khmara; Stanislav Kovalov	Ukraine	6:25.72
5	Julian Schöberl; Paul Sieber	Austria	6:26.85
6	Kakeru Sato; Mitsuo Nishimura	Japan	6:31.77

==== Final A ====
Rank	Rowers	Country	Time
1st place, gold medalist(s)	Gary O'Donovan; Paul O'Donovan	Ireland	6:06.81
2nd place, silver medalist(s)	Stefano Oppo; Pietro Ruta	Italy	6:08.31
3rd place, bronze medalist(s)	Tim Brys; Niels Van Zandweghe	Belgium	6:11.25
4	Benjamin van Dalen; Matthew Dunham	New Zealand	6:15.36
5	Are Strandli; Jens Holm	Norway	6:17.18
6	Patricio Rojas; Rodrigo Comero	Spain	6:19.26
