= Rowing at the 2020 Summer Olympics – Men's lightweight double sculls =

Olympic rowing event

Men's lightweight double sculls at the Games of the XXXII Olympiad
- Olympic rowing
- Venue: Sea Forest Waterway
- Dates: 24–29 July 2021
- Competitors: 36 from 18 nations
- Winning time: 6:06.43

Medalists
1st place, gold medalist(s)		Fintan McCarthy; Paul O'Donovan	Ireland
2nd place, silver medalist(s)		Jonathan Rommelmann; Jason Osborne	Germany
3rd place, bronze medalist(s)		Stefano Oppo; Pietro Ruta	Italy

The men's lightweight double sculls event at the 2020 Summer Olympics took place from 24 to 29 July 2021 at the Sea Forest Waterway. 36 rowers from 18 nations competed.

== Schedule ==
The competition was held over six days.

All times are Japan Standard Time (UTC+9)

Date	Time	Round
Saturday, 24 July 2021	10:50	Heats
Sunday, 25 July 2021	10:00	Repechage
Wednesday, 28 July 2021	11:10	Semifinals A/B*
Thursday, 29 July 2021	8:50	Final B*
Thursday, 29 July 2021	9:50	Final A
Thursday, 29 July 2021	11:20	Final C*

^{* Event has been rescheduled.}

== Results ==
=== Heats ===
The first two of each heat qualified for the semifinals, while the remainder went to the repechage.

==== Heat 1 ====
Rank	Lane	Rower	Nation	Time	Notes
1	3	Jonathan Rommelmann; Jason Osborne	Germany	6:21.71	Q
2	1	Stefano Oppo; Pietro Ruta	Italy	6:24.25	Q
3	2	Pedro Fraga; Afonso Costa	Portugal	6:44.09	R
4	4	Shakhboz Kholmurzaev; Sobirjon Safaroliyev	Uzbekistan	6:44.98	R
5	6	César Amaris; José Güipe	Venezuela	6:46.11	R
6	5	Siwakorn Wongpin; Nawamin Deenoi	Thailand	7:07.05	R

==== Heat 2 ====
Rank	Lane	Rower	Nation	Time	Notes
1	4	Fintan McCarthy; Paul O'Donovan	Ireland	6:23.74	Q
2	1	Jiří Šimánek; Miroslav Vraštil Jr.	Czech Republic	6:28.10	Q
3	2	Jerzy Kowalski; Artur Mikołajczewski	Poland	6:31.85	R
4	3	Ihor Khmara; Stanislav Kovalov	Ukraine	6:36.05	R
5	6	Arjun Lal; Arvind Singh	India	6:40.33	R
6	5	Bruno Cetraro; Felipe Klüver	Uruguay	6:42.85	R

==== Heat 3 ====
Rank	Lane	Rower	Nation	Time	Notes
1	2	Kristoffer Brun; Are Strandli	Norway	6:25.74	Q
2	6	Niels van Zandweghe; Tim Brys	Belgium	6:26.51	Q
3	1	Patrick Keane; Maxwell Lattimer	Canada	6:27.54	R
4	3	Caetano Horta; Manel Balastegui	Spain	6:38.72	R
5	4	César Abaroa; Eber Sanhueza	Chile	6:53.15	R
6	5	Kamel Ait Daoud; Sid Ali Boudina	Algeria	6:57.32	R

=== Repechage ===
The first three crews in the repechage qualified for the semifinals, while remaining crew to Final C.

==== Repechage heat 1 ====
Rank	Lane	Rower	Nation	Time	Notes
1	2	Ihor Khmara; Stanislav Kovalov	Ukraine	6:36.28	Q
2	3	Patrick Keane; Maxwell Lattimer	Canada	6:36.79	Q
3	1	Bruno Cetraro; Felipe Klüver	Uruguay	6:36.87	Q
4	4	Pedro Fraga; Afonso Costa	Portugal	6:36.95	FC
5	5	César Abaroa; Eber Sanhueza	Chile	6:48.22	FC
6	6	Siwakorn Wongpin; Nawamin Deenoi	Thailand	7:20.50	FC

==== Repechage heat 2 ====
Rank	Lane	Rower	Nation	Time	Notes
1	3	Jerzy Kowalski; Artur Mikołajczewski	Poland	6:43.44	Q
2	4	Caetano Horta; Manel Balastegui	Spain	6:45.71	Q
3	5	Arjun Lal; Arvind Singh	India	6:51.36	Q
4	2	Shakhboz Kholmurzaev; Sobirjon Safaroliyev	Uzbekistan	6:56.22	FC
5	1	César Amaris; José Güipe	Venezuela	7:01.46	FC
6	6	Kamel Ait Daoud; Sid Ali Boudina	Algeria	7:12.08	FC

=== Semifinals ===
==== Semifinal A/B 1 ====
Rank	Lane	Rower	Nation	Time	Notes
1	4	Jonathan Rommelmann; Jason Osborne	Germany	6:07.33	FA
2	1	Bruno Cetraro; Felipe Klüver	Uruguay	6:11:48	FA
3	5	Jiří Šimánek; Miroslav Vraštil Jr.	Czech Republic	6:11.88	FA
4	2	Jerzy Kowalski; Artur Mikołajczewski	Poland	6:12.79	FB
5	6	Patrick Keane; Maxwell Lattimer	Canada	6:18.29	FB
6	3	Kristoffer Brun; Are Strandli	Norway	12:16.25	FB

==== Semifinal A/B 2 ====
Rank	Lane	Rower	Nation	Time	Notes
1	3	Fintan McCarthy; Paul O'Donovan	Ireland	6:05.33	FA, WB, OB
2	4	Stefano Oppo; Pietro Ruta	Italy	6:07.70	FA
3	2	Niels van Zandweghe; Tim Brys	Belgium	6:13.07	FA
4	5	Ihor Khmara; Stanislav Kovalov	Ukraine	6:14.57	FB
5	1	Caetano Horta; Manel Balastegui	Spain	6:15.49	FB
6	6	Arjun Lal; Arvind Singh	India	6:24.41	FB

=== Finals ===
==== Final C ====
Rank	Lane	Rower	Nation	Time	Notes
13	3	Pedro Fraga; Afonso Costa	Portugal	6:24.44	
14	5	César Abaroa; Eber Sanhueza	Chile	6:31.97	
15	2	César Amaris; José Güipe	Venezuela	6:36.37	
16	4	Shakhboz Kholmurzaev; Sobirjon Safaroliyev	Uzbekistan	6:40.25	
17	6	Kamel Ait Daoud; Sid Ali Boudina	Algeria	6:41.62	
18	1	Siwakorn Wongpin; Nawamin Deenoi	Thailand	6:56.13	

==== Final B ====
Rank	Lane	Rower	Nation	Time	Notes
7	2	Caetano Horta; Manel Balastegui	Spain	6:15.45	
8	4	Jerzy Kowalski; Artur Mikołajczewski	Poland	6:16.01	
9	3	Ihor Khmara; Stanislav Kovalov	Ukraine	6:16.92	
10	5	Patrick Keane; Maxwell Lattimer	Canada	6:17.60	
11	1	Arjun Lal; Arvind Singh	India	6:29.66	
12	6	Kristoffer Brun; Are Strandli	Norway	DNS	

==== Final A ====
Rank	Lane	Rower	Nation	Time	Notes
1st place, gold medalist(s)	3	Fintan McCarthy; Paul O'Donovan	Ireland	6:06.43	
2nd place, silver medalist(s)	4	Jonathan Rommelmann; Jason Osborne	Germany	6:07.29	
3rd place, bronze medalist(s)	2	Stefano Oppo; Pietro Ruta	Italy	6:14.30	
4	1	Jiří Šimánek; Miroslav Vraštil Jr.	Czech Republic	6:16.42	
5	6	Niels van Zandweghe; Tim Brys	Belgium	6:18.10	
6	5	Bruno Cetraro; Felipe Klüver	Uruguay	6:24.21	
