= 2017 World Rowing Championships – Men's lightweight double sculls =

Men's lightweight double sculls at the 2017 World Rowing Championships
- Venue: Nathan Benderson Park
- Location: Sarasota, United States
- Dates: 24–30 September
- Competitors: 48 from 24 nations
- Winning time: 6:13.10

Medalists
gold medal	Pierre Houin; Jérémie Azou	France
silver medal	Stefano Oppo; Pietro Ruta	Italy
bronze medal	Sun Man; Fan Junjie	China

The men's lightweight double sculls competition at the 2017 World Rowing Championships in Sarasota took place in Nathan Benderson Park.

== Schedule ==
The schedule was as follows:

Date	Time	Round
Sunday 24 September 2017	11:30	Heats
Tuesday 26 September 2017	12:34	Repechages
Wednesday 27 September 2017	10:59	Semifinals C/D
Thursday 28 September 2017	11:51	Semifinals A/B
Thursday 28 September 2017	13:31	Final D
Friday 29 September 2017	13:55	Final C
Saturday 30 September 2017	09:10	Final B
Saturday 30 September 2017	10:53	Final A

All times are Eastern Daylight Time (UTC-4)

== Results ==
=== Heats ===
Heat winners advanced directly to the A/B semifinals. The remaining boats were sent to the repechages.

==== Heat 1 ====
Rank	Rowers	Country	Time	Notes
1	Pierre Houin; Jérémie Azou	France	6:19.37	SA/B
2	Emil Espensen; Mathias Larsen	Denmark	6:25.97	R
3	Alejandro Colomino; Carlo Lauro	Argentina	6:34.51	R
4	Leif Catalan Flores; Gerardo Campa Rocche	Guatemala	6:53.21	R
5	Anton Kuranov; Nazar Lifshitc	Russia	6:54.40	R
6	Dennis Aweh; Ayodeji Ikuseyidunmi	Nigeria	8:02.56	R

==== Heat 2 ====
Rank	Rowers	Country	Time	Notes
1	Sun Man; Fan Junjie	China	6:26.82	SA/B
2	Ihor Khmara; Stanislav Kovalov	Ukraine	6:30.47	R
3	Lucas Schäfer; Jason Osborne	Germany	6:44.86	R
4	Vaughn Botes; Nicholas Oberholzer	South Africa	7:12.82	R
5	Omar Amer; Yahia Eldeib	Egypt	7:16.39	R
6	Alfred Okello; Arnold Omony	Uganda	7:54.04	R

==== Heat 3 ====
Rank	Rowers	Country	Time	Notes
1	Jerzy Kowalski; Miłosz Jankowski	Poland	6:26.06	SA/B
2	Tim Brys; Niels Van Zandweghe	Belgium	6:32.85	R
3	Jiří Šimánek; Miroslav Vraštil Jr.	Czech Republic	6:37.55	R
4	Yuki Ikeda; Kakeru Sato	Japan	6:41.85	R
5	Chris Rogers; Peter Schmidt	United States	6:43.27	R
6	Takhir Rakhmatov; Shakhzod Nasridinov	Uzbekistan	7:01.47	R

==== Heat 4 ====
Rank	Rowers	Country	Time	Notes
1	Stefano Oppo; Pietro Ruta	Italy	6:29.13	SA/B
2	Samuel Mottram; Jamie Copus	Great Britain	6:36.69	R
3	Jesus Gonzalez; Patricio Rojas	Spain	6:39.97	R
4	Taylor Hardy; Patrick Keane	Canada	6:42.11	R
5	Mauricio Lopez Berocay; Bruno Cetraro	Uruguay	6:50.35	R
6	Gianfranco Colmenares; Johann Hamann Zlatar	Peru	7:09.55	R

=== Repechages ===
The two fastest boats in each repechage advanced to the A/B semifinals. The remaining boats were sent to the C/D semifinals.

==== Repechage 1 ====
Rank	Rowers	Country	Time	Notes
1	Emil Espensen; Mathias Larsen	Denmark	6:22.56	SA/B
2	Lucas Schäfer; Jason Osborne	Germany	6:29.60	SA/B
3	Yuki Ikeda; Kakeru Sato	Japan	6:32.73	SC/D
4	Mauricio Lopez Berocay; Bruno Cetraro	Uruguay	6:47.55	SC/D
5	Dennis Aweh; Ayodeji Ikuseyidunmi	Nigeria	7:45.18	SC/D

==== Repechage 2 ====
Rank	Rowers	Country	Time	Notes
1	Ihor Khmara; Stanislav Kovalov	Ukraine	6:24.11	SA/B
2	Jiří Šimánek; Miroslav Vraštil Jr.	Czech Republic	6:24.17	SA/B
3	Taylor Hardy; Patrick Keane	Canada	6:30.21	SC/D
4	Anton Kuranov; Nazar Lifshitc	Russia	6:42.45	SC/D
5	Alfred Okello; Arnold Omony	Uganda	7:46.03	SC/D

==== Repechage 3 ====
Rank	Rowers	Country	Time	Notes
1	Tim Brys; Niels Van Zandweghe	Belgium	6:37.44	SA/B
2	Jesus Gonzalez; Patricio Rojas	Spain	6:43.41	SA/B
3	Takhir Rakhmatov; Shakhzod Nasridinov	Uzbekistan	6:50.51	SC/D
4	Leif Catalan Flores; Gerardo Campa Rocche	Guatemala	6:57.07	SC/D
5	Omar Amer; Yahia Eldeib	Egypt	7:06.53	SC/D

==== Repechage 4 ====
Rank	Rowers	Country	Time	Notes
1	Samuel Mottram; Jamie Copus	Great Britain	6:24.70	SA/B
2	Vaughn Botes; Nicholas Oberholzer	South Africa	6:26.13	SA/B
3	Alejandro Colomino; Carlo Lauro	Argentina	6:26.16	SC/D
4	Chris Rogers; Peter Schmidt	United States	6:37.41	SC/D
5	Gianfranco Colmenares; Johann Hamann Zlatar	Peru	6:57.11	SC/D

=== Semifinals C/D ===
The three fastest boats in each semi were sent to the C final. The remaining boats were sent to the D final.

==== Semifinal 1 ====
Rank	Rowers	Country	Time	Notes
1	Chris Rogers; Peter Schmidt	United States	6:42.42	FC
2	Anton Kuranov; Nazar Lifshitc	Russia	6:45.41	FC
3	Yuki Ikeda; Kakeru Sato	Japan	6:47.51	FC
4	Takhir Rakhmatov; Shakhzod Nasridinov	Uzbekistan	7:02.54	FD
5	Omar Amer; Yahia Eldeib	Egypt	7:13.31	FD
6	Dennis Aweh; Ayodeji Ikuseyidunmi	Nigeria	8:02.65	FD

==== Semifinal 2 ====
Rank	Rowers	Country	Time	Notes
1	Taylor Hardy; Patrick Keane	Canada	6:40.73	FC
2	Alejandro Colomino; Carlo Lauro	Argentina	6:46.05	FC
3	Mauricio Lopez Berocay; Bruno Cetraro	Uruguay	6:49.01	FC
4	Gianfranco Colmenares; Johann Hamann Zlatar	Peru	6:58.91	FD
5	Leif Catalan Flores; Gerardo Campa Rocche	Guatemala	7:07.47	FD
6	Alfred Okello; Arnold Omony	Uganda	7:56.11	FD

=== Semifinals A/B ===
The three fastest boats in each semi advanced to the A final. The remaining boats were sent to the B final.

==== Semifinal 1 ====
Rank	Rowers	Country	Time	Notes
1	Pierre Houin; Jérémie Azou	France	6:18.10	FA
2	Jerzy Kowalski; Miłosz Jankowski	Poland	6:20.85	FA
3	Lucas Schäfer; Jason Osborne	Germany	6:22.31	FA
4	Samuel Mottram; Jamie Copus	Great Britain	6:24.22	FB
5	Ihor Khmara; Stanislav Kovalov	Ukraine	6:26.83	FB
6	Jesus Gonzalez; Patricio Rojas	Spain	6:38.84	FB

==== Semifinal 2 ====
Rank	Rowers	Country	Time	Notes
1	Stefano Oppo; Pietro Ruta	Italy	6:20.59	FA
2	Sun Man; Fan Junjie	China	6:21.27	FA
3	Tim Brys; Niels Van Zandweghe	Belgium	6:22.76	FA
4	Jiří Šimánek; Miroslav Vraštil Jr.	Czech Republic	6:25.69	FB
5	Emil Espensen; Mathias Larsen	Denmark	6:26.10	FB
6	Vaughn Botes; Nicholas Oberholzer	South Africa	6:48.90	FB

=== Finals ===
The A final determined the rankings for places 1 to 6. Additional rankings were determined in the other finals.

==== Final D ====
Rank	Rowers	Country	Time
1	Takhir Rakhmatov; Shakhzod Nasridinov	Uzbekistan	6:45.29
2	Gianfranco Colmenares; Johann Hamann Zlatar	Peru	6:50.16
3	Leif Catalan Flores; Gerardo Campa Rocche	Guatemala	6:55.36
4	Omar Amer; Yahia Eldeib	Egypt	7:02.89
5	Alfred Okello; Arnold Omony	Uganda	7:34.91
6	Dennis Aweh; Ayodeji Ikuseyidunmi	Nigeria	7:49.19

==== Final C ====
Rank	Rowers	Country	Time
1	Taylor Hardy; Patrick Keane	Canada	6:27.48
2	Alejandro Colomino; Carlo Lauro	Argentina	6:28.98
3	Yuki Ikeda; Kakeru Sato	Japan	6:31.01
4	Chris Rogers; Peter Schmidt	United States	6:34.06
5	Anton Kuranov; Nazar Lifshitc	Russia	6:39.02
6	Mauricio Lopez Berocay; Bruno Cetraro	Uruguay	6:39.10

==== Final B ====
Rank	Rowers	Country	Time
1	Jiří Šimánek; Miroslav Vraštil Jr.	Czech Republic	6:19.11
2	Emil Espensen; Mathias Larsen	Denmark	6:20.75
3	Ihor Khmara; Stanislav Kovalov	Ukraine	6:23.03
4	Samuel Mottram; Jamie Copus	Great Britain	6:23.12
5	Jesus Gonzalez; Patricio Rojas	Spain	6:28.42
6	Vaughn Botes; Nicholas Oberholzer	South Africa	6:37.22

==== Final A ====
Rank	Rowers	Country	Time
1st place, gold medalist(s)	Pierre Houin; Jérémie Azou	France	6:13.10
2nd place, silver medalist(s)	Stefano Oppo; Pietro Ruta	Italy	6:15.15
3rd place, bronze medalist(s)	Sun Man; Fan Junjie	China	6:15.40
4	Jerzy Kowalski; Miłosz Jankowski	Poland	6:15.94
5	Tim Brys; Niels Van Zandweghe	Belgium	6:17.00
6	Lucas Schäfer; Jason Osborne	Germany	6:19.52
