= 2018 World Rowing Championships – Men's lightweight single sculls =

Rowing event

Men's lightweight single sculls at the 2018 World Rowing Championships
- Venue: Plovdiv Regatta Venue
- Location: Plovdiv, Bulgaria
- Dates: 9–14 September
- Competitors: 19 from 19 nations
- Winning time: 6:56.36

Medalists
gold medal	Jason Osborne	Germany
silver medal	Michael Schmid	Switzerland
bronze medal	Andrew Campbell	United States

The men's lightweight single sculls competition at the 2018 World Rowing Championships in Plovdiv took place at the Plovdiv Regatta Venue.

== Schedule ==
The schedule was as follows:

Date	Time	Round
Sunday 9 September 2018	09:30	Heats
Tuesday 11 September 2018	10:10	Repechages
Thursday 13 September 2018	10:42	Semifinals A/B
Thursday 13 September 2018	17:09	Semifinals C/D
Friday 14 September 2018	13:00	Final A
Friday 14 September 2018	15:11	Final B
Friday 14 September 2018	15:27	Final C
Friday 14 September 2018	15:43	Final D

All times are Eastern European Summer Time (UTC+3)

== Results ==
=== Heats ===
The two fastest boats in each heat advanced directly to the A/B semifinals. The remaining boats were sent to the repechages.

==== Heat 1 ====
Rank	Rowers	Country	Time	Notes
1	Michael Schmid	Switzerland	6:48.49	SA/B
2	Andrew Campbell	United States	6:51.91	SA/B
3	Péter Galambos	Hungary	7:03.94	R
4	Alexis Lopez	Mexico	7:19.19	R
5	Miloš Stanojević	Serbia	7:23.89	R

==== Heat 2 ====
Rank	Rowers	Country	Time	Notes
1	Aaron Lattimer	Canada	6:47.93	SA/B
2	Martino Goretti	Italy	6:48.39	SA/B
3	Samuel Mottram	Great Britain	6:52.80	R
4	Chiu Hin Chun	Hong Kong	7:08.93	R
5	Kasper Hirvilampi	Finland	7:30.08	R

==== Heat 3 ====
Rank	Rowers	Country	Time	Notes
1	Sun Man	China	6:52.58	SA/B
2	Hugo Beurey	France	6:52.89	SA/B
3	Hamish Parry	Australia	6:54.08	R
4	Rainer Kepplinger	Austria	7:05.51	R
5	Yuki Ikeda	Japan	7:10.48	R

==== Heat 4 ====
Rank	Rowers	Country	Time	Notes
1	Jason Osborne	Germany	6:41.03	SA/B, WB
2	Rajko Hrvat	Slovenia	7:10.33	SA/B
3	Lazar Penev	Bulgaria	7:25.79	R
4	Jason Williams	Bahamas	7:57.39	R

=== Repechages ===
The two fastest boats in each repechage advanced to the A/B semifinals. The remaining boats were sent to the C/D semifinals.

==== Repechage 1 ====
Rank	Rowers	Country	Time	Notes
1	Péter Galambos	Hungary	6:53.48	SA/B
2	Hamish Parry	Australia	6:59.57	SA/B
3	Chiu Hin Chun	Hong Kong	7:05.06	SC/D
4	Miloš Stanojević	Serbia	7:12.00	SC/D
5	Jason Williams	Bahamas	7:55.32	SC/D

==== Repechage 2 ====
Rank	Rowers	Country	Time	Notes
1	Samuel Mottram	Great Britain	6:54.64	SA/B
2	Alexis Lopez	Mexico	6:58.46	SA/B
3	Rainer Kepplinger	Austria	6:59.09	SC/D
4	Yuki Ikeda	Japan	7:06.20	SC/D
5	Lazar Penev	Bulgaria	7:21.42	SC/D
6	Kasper Hirvilampi	Finland	7:35.76	SC/D

=== Semifinals C/D ===
All but the slowest boat in each semi were sent to the C final. The slowest boats were sent to the D final.

==== Semifinal 1 ====
Rank	Rowers	Country	Time	Notes
1	Chiu Hin Chun	Hong Kong	7:23.27	FC
2	Yuki Ikeda	Japan	7:25.23	FC
3	Lazar Penev	Bulgaria	7:41.90	FD

==== Semifinal 2 ====
Rank	Rowers	Country	Time	Notes
1	Rainer Kepplinger	Austria	7:27.29	FC
2	Miloš Stanojević	Serbia	7:34.59	FC
3	Kasper Hirvilampi	Finland	7:53.09	FC
4	Jason Williams	Bahamas	8:28.29	FD

=== Semifinals A/B ===
The three fastest boats in each semi advanced to the A final. The remaining boats were sent to the B final.

==== Semifinal 1 ====
Rank	Rowers	Country	Time	Notes
1	Michael Schmid	Switzerland	6:54.03	FA
2	Péter Galambos	Hungary	6:54.92	FA
3	Sun Man	China	6:56.79	FA
4	Martino Goretti	Italy	6:59.05	FB
5	Alexis Lopez	Mexico	7:04.49	FB
6	Rajko Hrvat	Slovenia	7:07.70	FB

==== Semifinal 2 ====
Rank	Rowers	Country	Time	Notes
1	Jason Osborne	Germany	6:52.97	FA
2	Andrew Campbell	United States	6:53.65	FA
3	Aaron Lattimer	Canada	6:55.72	FA
4	Samuel Mottram	Great Britain	6:59.33	FB
5	Hamish Parry	Australia	7:00.64	FB
6	Hugo Beurey	France	7:10.39	FB

=== Finals ===
The A final determined the rankings for places 1 to 6. Additional rankings were determined in the other finals.

==== Final D ====
Rank	Rowers	Country	Time
1	Lazar Penev	Bulgaria	7:40.44
2	Jason Williams	Bahamas	8:29.88

==== Final C ====
Rank	Rowers	Country	Time
1	Rainer Kepplinger	Austria	7:04.75
2	Chiu Hin Chun	Hong Kong	7:06.80
3	Miloš Stanojević	Serbia	7:07.14
4	Yuki Ikeda	Japan	7:12.03
5	Kasper Hirvilampi	Finland	7:32.92

==== Final B ====
Rank	Rowers	Country	Time
1	Martino Goretti	Italy	7:06.00
2	Samuel Mottram	Great Britain	7:06.94
3	Hamish Parry	Australia	7:07.84
4	Rajko Hrvat	Slovenia	7:10.52
5	Alexis López	Mexico	7:15.40
6	Hugo Beurey	France	7:19.10

==== Final A ====
Rank	Rowers	Country	Time
1st place, gold medalist(s)	Jason Osborne	Germany	6:56.36
2nd place, silver medalist(s)	Michael Schmid	Switzerland	6:58.34
3rd place, bronze medalist(s)	Andrew Campbell	United States	7:00.04
4	Aaron Lattimer	Canada	7:01.80
5	Sun Man	China	7:10.12
6	Péter Galambos	Hungary	7:13.03
