= Miroslav Vraštil =

Miroslav Vraštil may refer to:

- Miroslav Vraštil Sr. (born 1951), Czech rower
- Miroslav Vraštil Jr. (born 1982), Czech rower
