= Rowing at the 2023 Pan American Games – Men's lightweight double sculls =

Men's lightweight double sculls at the 2023 Pan American Games
- Venue: Laguna Grande
- Dates: October 22 – October 24
- Competitors: 18 from 9 nations
- Winning time: 6:22.94

Medalists
Gold medal	Miguel Carballo; Alexis López	Mexico
Silver medal	César Abaroa; Eber Sanhueza	Chile
Bronze medal	Alejandro Colomino; Pedro Dickson	Argentina

The men's lightweight double sculls competition of the rowing events at the 2023 Pan American Games was held from October 22 to 24 at Laguna Grande in San Pedro de la Paz, Chile.

== Schedule ==
Date	Time	Round
October 22, 2023	9:30	Heat 1
October 22, 2023	9:40	Heat 2
October 23, 2023	8:10	Repechage
October 24, 2023	9:30	Final A
October 24, 2023	9:50	Final B

== Results ==
=== Heats ===
==== Heat 1 ====
Rank	Rowers	Country	Time	Notes
1	Miguel Carballo; Alexis López	Mexico	6:34.95	FA
2	César Abaroa; Eber Sanhueza	Chile	6:26.39	FA
3	Alejandro Colomino; Pedro Dickson	Argentina	6:29.68	R
4	José Rafael Pérez; Carlo Rodríguez	Cuba	7:07.94	R
5	Uncas Batista; Marcelo Almeida	Brazil	7:09.46	R

==== Heat 2 ====
Rank	Rowers	Country	Time	Notes
1	Emerson Crick; Stephen Harris	Canada	6:34.34	FA
2	Alex Twist; Sean Richardson	United States	6:37.01	FA
3	Mauricio López; Felipe Kluver	Uruguay	6:50.41	R
4	Andrés Sandoval; Cesar Cipriani	Peru	6:52.98	R

=== Repechage ===
Rank	Rowers	Country	Time	Notes
1	Uncas Batista; Marcelo Almeida	Brazil	6:39.28	FA
2	Alejandro Colomino; Pedro Dickson	Argentina	6:43.80	FA
3	Andrés Sandoval; Cesar Cipriani	Peru	6:48.29	FB
4	José Rafael Pérez; Carlo Rodríguez	Cuba	7:11.98	FB
	Mauricio López; Felipe Kluver	Uruguay	DSQ	

=== Final B ===
Rank	Rowers	Country	Time	Notes
7	Andrés Sandoval; Cesar Cipriani	Peru	6:52.50	
8	José Rafael Pérez; Carlo Rodríguez	Cuba	7:11.53	

=== Final A ===
Rank	Rowers	Country	Time	Notes
1st place, gold medalist(s)	Miguel Carballo; Alexis López	Mexico	6:22.94	
2nd place, silver medalist(s)	César Abaroa; Eber Sanhueza	Chile	6:25.85	
3rd place, bronze medalist(s)	Alejandro Colomino; Pedro Dickson	Argentina	6:27.26	
4	Uncas Batista; Marcelo Almeida	Brazil	6:29.32	
5	Emerson Crick; Stephen Harris	Canada	6:33.94	
6	Alex Twist; Sean Richardson	United States	6:34.06	
