= 2017 World Rowing Championships – Men's lightweight single sculls =

Men's lightweight single sculls at the 2017 World Rowing Championships
- Venue: Nathan Benderson Park
- Location: Sarasota, United States
- Dates: 24–29 September
- Competitors: 26 from 26 nations
- Winning time: 6:48.87

Medalists
gold medal	Paul O'Donovan	Ireland
silver medal	Matthew Dunham	New Zealand
bronze medal	Kristoffer Brun	Norway

The men's lightweight single sculls competition at the 2017 World Rowing Championships in Sarasota took place in Nathan Benderson Park.

== Schedule ==
The schedule was as follows:

Date	Time	Round
Sunday 24 September 2017	10:20	Heats
Tuesday 26 September 2017	11:53	Repechage
Wednesday 27 September 2017	12:16	Quarterfinals
Thursday 28 September 2017	10:11	Semifinals A/B
Thursday 28 September 2017	13:16	Final E
Thursday 28 September 2017	13:21	Semifinals C/D
Friday 29 September 2017	09:05	Final B
Friday 29 September 2017	09:25	Final D
Friday 29 September 2017	09:30	Final C
Friday 29 September 2017	12:15	Final A

All times are Eastern Daylight Time (UTC-4)

== Results ==
=== Heats ===
The four fastest boats in each heat advanced directly to the quarterfinals. The remaining boats were sent to the repechage.

==== Heat 1 ====
Rank	Rower	Country	Time	Notes
1	Artur Mikołajczewski	Poland	6:56.84	Q
2	Alexis Lopez	Mexico	7:02.00	Q
3	Lukáš Babač	Slovakia	7:05.88	Q
4	Luka Radonić	Croatia	7:06.70	Q
5	Georgios Konsolas	Greece	7:17.34	R
6	Stephen Paniotei	Nigeria	8:21.26	R

==== Heat 2 ====
Rank	Rower	Country	Time	Notes
1	Matthew Dunham	New Zealand	6:50.43	Q
2	Kristoffer Brun	Norway	6:52.47	Q
3	Jan Cincibuch	Czech Republic	7:03.32	Q
4	Mohamed Taieb	Tunisia	7:08.12	Q
5	Shakhboz Kholmurzaev	Uzbekistan	7:12.50	R

==== Heat 3 ====
Rank	Rower	Country	Time	Notes
1	Paul O'Donovan	Ireland	6:54.68	Q
2	Uncas Batista	Brazil	7:05.75	Q
3	Lorenzo Galano	Italy	7:09.88	Q
4	Jaruwat Saensuk	Thailand	7:17.50	Q
5	Gunther Slowing Rossil	Guatemala	7:19.38	R

==== Heat 4 ====
Rank	Rower	Country	Time	Notes
1	Rajko Hrvat	Slovenia	6:57.63	Q
2	Péter Galambos	Hungary	7:08.21	Q
3	Bayram Sönmez	Turkey	7:12.85	Q
4	Park Hyun-su	South Korea	7:20.72	Q
5	Bryan Sola Zambrano	Ecuador	7:27.93	R

==== Heat 5 ====
Rank	Rower	Country	Time	Notes
1	Lars Wichert	Germany	7:00.31	Q
2	Michael Schmid	Switzerland	7:04.60	Q
3	Nicholas Trojan	United States	7:08.62	Q
4	Aaron Lattimer	Canada	7:11.20	Q
5	Raúl Hernández	Cuba	7:33.15	R

=== Repechage ===
The four fastest boats advanced to the quarterfinals. The remaining boats were sent to the E final.

Rank	Rower	Country	Time	Notes
1	Raúl Hernández	Cuba	7:14.05	Q
2	Shakhboz Kholmurzaev	Uzbekistan	7:15.51	Q
3	Georgios Konsolas	Greece	7:19.86	Q
4	Gunther Slowing Rossil	Guatemala	7:23.14	Q
5	Bryan Sola Zambrano	Ecuador	8:15.06	FE
6	Stephen Paniotei	Nigeria	8:28.69	FE

=== Quarterfinals ===
The three fastest boats in each quarter advanced to the A/B semifinals. The remaining boats were sent to the C/D semifinals.

==== Quarterfinal 1 ====
Rank	Rower	Country	Time	Notes
1	Michael Schmid	Switzerland	7:01.41	SA/B
2	Kristoffer Brun	Norway	7:03.37	SA/B
3	Artur Mikołajczewski	Poland	7:09.27	SA/B
4	Lorenzo Galano	Italy	7:13.26	SC/D
5	Georgios Konsolas	Greece	7:24.37	SC/D
6	Park Hyun-su	South Korea	7:31.39	SC/D

==== Quarterfinal 2 ====
Rank	Rower	Country	Time	Notes
1	Matthew Dunham	New Zealand	7:00.28	SA/B
2	Péter Galambos	Hungary	7:02.93	SA/B
3	Alexis Lopez	Mexico	7:04.42	SA/B
4	Aaron Lattimer	Canada	7:05.44	SC/D
5	Raúl Hernández	Cuba	7:13.87	SC/D
6	Jaruwat Saensuk	Thailand	7:21.34	SC/D

==== Quarterfinal 3 ====
Rank	Rower	Country	Time	Notes
1	Paul O'Donovan	Ireland	6:56.99	SA/B
2	Lars Wichert	Germany	7:01.74	SA/B
3	Luka Radonić	Croatia	7:04.54	SA/B
4	Jan Cincibuch	Czech Republic	7:08.13	SC/D
5	Bayram Sönmez	Turkey	7:11.31	SC/D
6	Gunther Slowing Rossil	Guatemala	7:32.17	SC/D

==== Quarterfinal 4 ====
Rank	Rower	Country	Time	Notes
1	Lukáš Babač	Slovakia	6:58.45	SA/B
2	Uncas Batista	Brazil	7:00.23	SA/B
3	Nicholas Trojan	United States	7:06.25	SA/B
4	Shakhboz Kholmurzaev	Uzbekistan	7:08.90	SC/D
5	Mohamed Taieb	Tunisia	7:22.25	SC/D
–	Rajko Hrvat	Slovenia	DNF	SC/D

=== Semifinals C/D ===
The three fastest boats in each semi were sent to the C final. The remaining boats were sent to the D final.

==== Semifinal 1 ====
Rank	Rower	Country	Time	Notes
1	Rajko Hrvat	Slovenia	6:59.23	FC
2	Jan Cincibuch	Czech Republic	7:03.68	FC
3	Lorenzo Galano	Italy	7:04.31	FC
4	Raúl Hernández	Cuba	7:05.72	FD
5	Park Hyun-su	South Korea	7:30.11	FD
–	Mohamed Taieb	Tunisia	DNS	–

==== Semifinal 2 ====
Rank	Rower	Country	Time	Notes
1	Aaron Lattimer	Canada	7:10.09	FC
2	Shakhboz Kholmurzaev	Uzbekistan	7:13.77	FC
3	Bayram Sönmez	Turkey	7:14.84	FC
4	Georgios Konsolas	Greece	7:22.56	FD
5	Jaruwat Saensuk	Thailand	7:30.25	FD
6	Gunther Slowing Rossil	Guatemala	7:33.14	FD

=== Semifinals A/B ===
The three fastest boats in each semi advanced to the A final. The remaining boats were sent to the B final.

==== Semifinal 1 ====
Rank	Rower	Country	Time	Notes
1	Paul O'Donovan	Ireland	6:55.30	FA
2	Michael Schmid	Switzerland	6:59.04	FA
3	Uncas Batista	Brazil	7:00.47	FA
4	Artur Mikołajczewski	Poland	7:02.65	FB
5	Nicholas Trojan	United States	7:05.56	FB
6	Péter Galambos	Hungary	7:07.87	FB

==== Semifinal 2 ====
Rank	Rower	Country	Time	Notes
1	Kristoffer Brun	Norway	6:54.02	FA
2	Matthew Dunham	New Zealand	6:55.68	FA
3	Lars Wichert	Germany	6:57.11	FA
4	Alexis Lopez	Mexico	7:05.24	FB
5	Lukáš Babač	Slovakia	7:09.63	FB
6	Luka Radonić	Croatia	7:29.78	FB

=== Finals ===
The A final determined the rankings for places 1 to 6. Additional rankings were determined in the other finals.

==== Final E ====
Rank	Rower	Country	Time
1	Bryan Sola Zambrano	Ecuador	7:41.41
2	Stephen Paniotei	Nigeria	8:21.27

==== Final D ====
Rank	Rower	Country	Time
1	Raúl Hernández	Cuba	7:21.75
2	Park Hyun-su	South Korea	7:26.95
3	Georgios Konsolas	Greece	7:29.94
4	Jaruwat Saensuk	Thailand	7:31.91
5	Gunther Slowing Rossil	Guatemala	7:45.81

==== Final C ====
Rank	Rower	Country	Time
1	Rajko Hrvat	Slovenia	7:05.31
2	Aaron Lattimer	Canada	7:10.82
3	Lorenzo Galano	Italy	7:12.76
4	Jan Cincibuch	Czech Republic	7:14.20
5	Shakhboz Kholmurzaev	Uzbekistan	7:25.35
6	Bayram Sönmez	Turkey	7:32.64

==== Final B ====
Rank	Rower	Country	Time
1	Alexis López	Mexico	7:07.26
2	Lukáš Babač	Slovakia	7:11.59
3	Luka Radonić	Croatia	7:12.91
4	Nicholas Trojan	United States	7:17.61
5	Péter Galambos	Hungary	7:28.37
6	Artur Mikołajczewski	Poland	DNS

==== Final A ====
Rank	Rower	Country	Time
1st place, gold medalist(s)	Paul O'Donovan	Ireland	6:48.87
2nd place, silver medalist(s)	Matthew Dunham	New Zealand	6:52.16
3rd place, bronze medalist(s)	Kristoffer Brun	Norway	6:52.35
4	Michael Schmid	Switzerland	6:56.37
5	Lars Wichert	Germany	7:02.25
6	Uncas Batista	Brazil	7:05.85
