= Rowing at the 2013 Mediterranean Games – Men's lightweight single sculls =

The men's lightweight single sculls rowing event at the 2013 Mediterranean Games will be held from June 21–23 at the Seyhan Dam in Adana.

== Schedule ==
All times are Eastern European Summer Time (UTC+3).

Date	Time	Round
June 21, 2013	10:20	Heats
June 23, 2013	10:30	Final A

== Results ==
=== Heat 1 ===
Rank	Rowers	Country	Time	Notes
1	Pietro Ruta	Italy	7:05.97	FA
2	Rajko Hrvat	Slovenia	7:09.69	FA
3	Huseyin Kandemir	Turkey	7:15.25	FA
4	Panagiotis Magdanis	Greece	7:20.63	FA
5	Aymen Mejri	Tunisia	7:31.78	FA
6	Sidali Boudina	Algeria	7:49.99	FA
