= Gary O'Donovan =

Irish rower

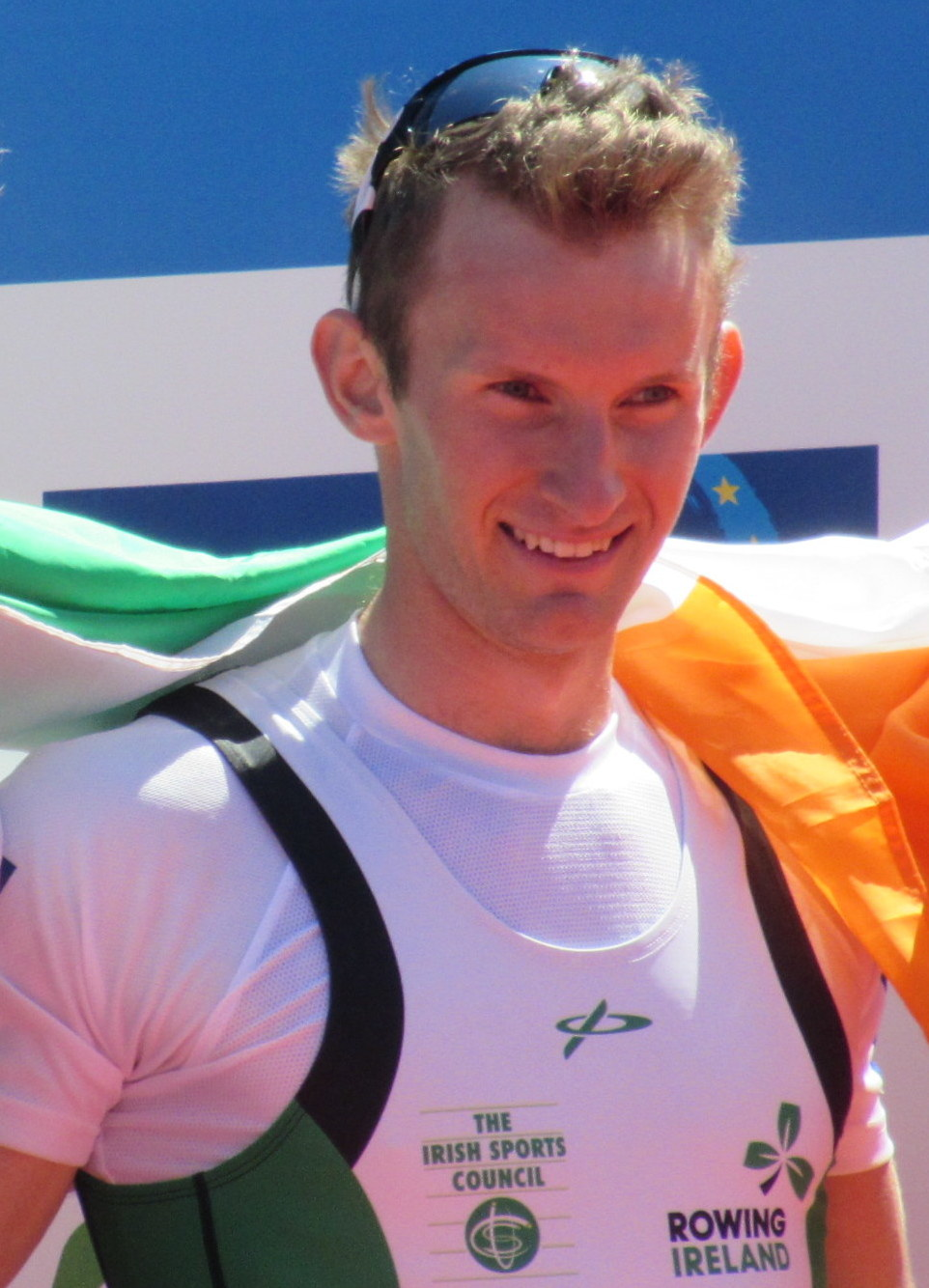
- O'Donovan at the 2016 European Rowing Championships

Personal information
- Born: 30 December 1992 (age 33) Lisheen, County Cork, Ireland
- Height: 1.72 m (5 ft 7 1/2 in)
- Weight: 70 kg (150 lb)

Sport
- Country: Ireland
- Sport: Rowing
- Event: Lightweight double sculls
- Coached by: Teddy O'Donovan; Dominic Casey

Achievements and titles
- Olympic finals: Silver Medal (Lightweight double sculls, Rio 2016)
Medal record
Men's Rowing
Representing Ireland
Olympic Games
Silver medal – second place	2016 Rio de Janeiro	LM2x
World Championships
Gold medal – first place	2018 Plovdiv	LM2x
European Championships
Gold medal – first place	2016 Brandenburg	LM2x
Silver medal – second place	2017 Račice	LM2x
Silver medal – second place	2018 Glasgow	LM2x

Gary O'Donovan (born 30 December 1992) is an Irish rower. Together with his brother Paul he won the gold medal in the lightweight double sculls at the 2016 European Rowing Championships, silver in the same discipline at the 2016 Summer Olympics, and gold at the 2018 World Rowing Championships. He was the flag bearer for Ireland during the closing ceremony of the 2016 Summer Olympics.

== Early life ==
Gary O'Donovan was born on 30 December 1992 to Trish and Teddy O'Donovan, and grew up in Lisheen near Skibbereen in County Cork. He attended Lisheen National School, later St Fachtna's De La Salle secondary school in Skibbereen. He also went to study part-time at Cork Institute of Technology in 2011, and graduated with a degree in marketing in 2016.

Gary and his younger brother Paul became involved with rowing in 2001 when he was aged around eight. His father, who was a rower, took the two brothers to Skibbereen Rowing Club where he coached them in the sport. They were selected for the Irish junior team at the Home International Regatta held in Wales in 2008, and won gold in the junior quad sculls.

== Rowing career ==
In April 2016, Paul and Gary O'Donovan won silver in the lightweight double sculls at the first World Rowing Cup events of the year in Varese, Italy. In the following month, the pair won the 2016 European Rowing Championships gold medal in the double sculls in Brandenburg, Germany.

In August 2016 at the Rio Olympics, the O'Donovan brothers won silver behind France in the lightweight double sculls, the first rowing medal won by Ireland in the Olympics.

In 2017, the brothers won silver in men's lightweight double sculls at the European Rowing Championships in May 2017. They also won silver at the second World Rowing Cup regatta of the season in Poland in June, and bronze at the third in July.

At the 2018 European Championships in Glasgow, the O'Donovan brothers won silver in the lightweight double sculls, and later became world champions in the same event at the 2018 World Rowing Championships.
