= Patrick Keane (rower) =

Canadian rower

Personal information
- Born: July 19, 1997 (age 29) Victoria, British Columbia, Canada

Sport
- Country: Canada
- Sport: Rowing

Patrick Keane (born July 19, 1997) is a Canadian rower from Victoria, British Columbia. Keane competes in the lightweight double sculls event.

== Career ==
Keane has competed at three World Championships. Keane finished in 13th in 2017 with partner Taylor Hardy and then 15th and 9th respectively at the 2018 and 2019 editions.

In May 2021, Keane and partner Maxwell Lattimer qualified the singles sculls boat for Canada's 2020 Olympic team, by winning the 2021 FISA Final Qualification Regatta in Lucerne, Switzerland.
