= Pietro Ruta =

Italian rower (born 1987)

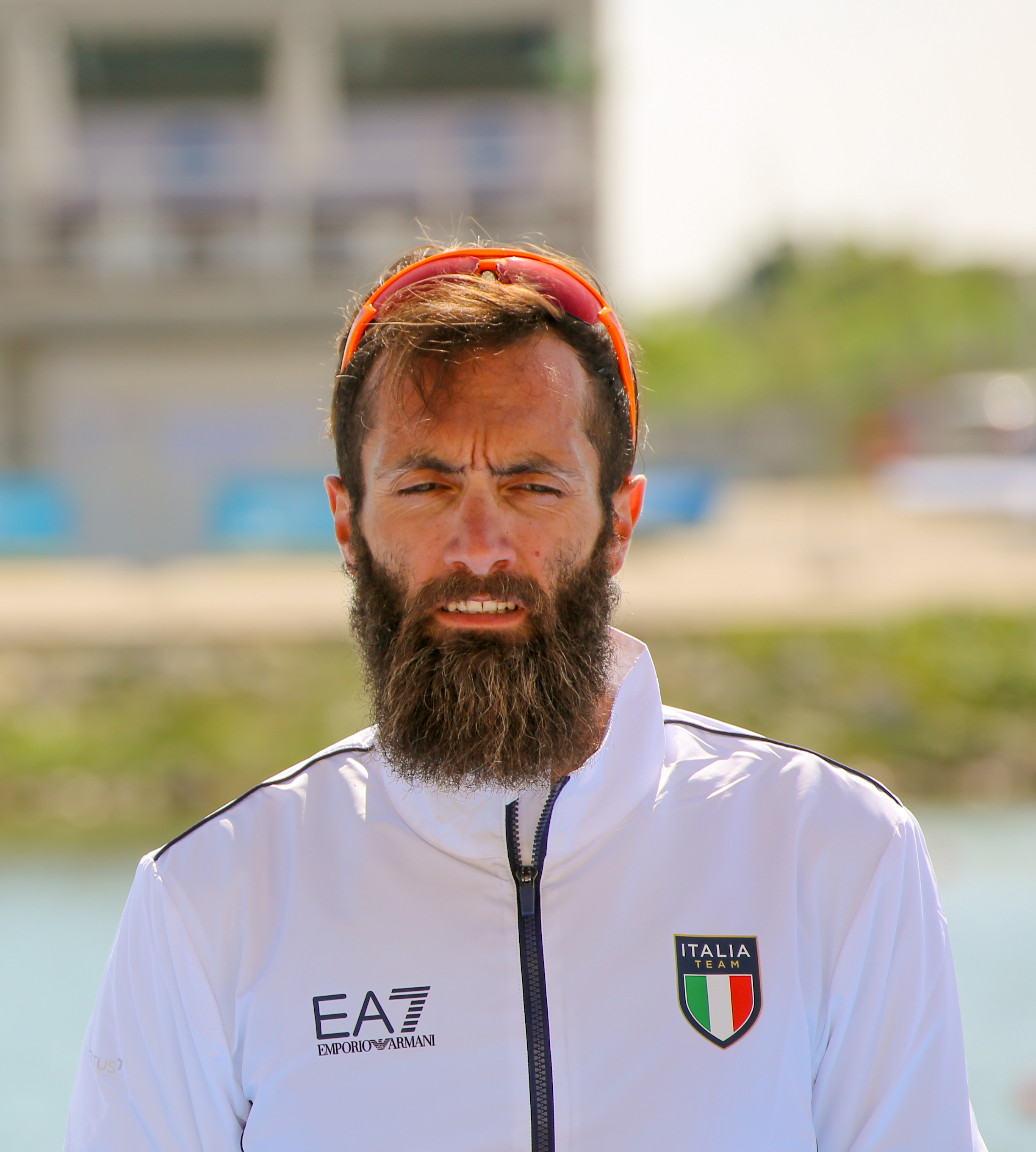
- Ruta in 2018

Personal information
- Full name: Pietro Willy Ruta
- Nationality: Italian
- Born: 6 August 1987 (age 38) Gravedona, Italy
- Height: 1.84 m (6 ft 0 in)
- Weight: 72 kg (159 lb)

Sport
- Country: Italy
- Sport: Rowing
- Event(s): Lightweight single sculls, Lightweight double sculls, Lightweight coxless four, Lightweight quadruple sculls
- Club: Marina Militare Sabaudia; Fiamme Oro
Medal record
Men's rowing
Representing Italy
Event	1st	2nd	3rd
Olympic Games	0	0	1
World Championships	1	5	0
European Championships	2	2	3
Mediterranean Games	2	0	0
Total	5	7	4
Olympic Games
Bronze medal – third place	2020 Tokyo	Lwt double sculls
World Championships
Gold medal – first place	2023 Belgrade	Lwt quad sculls
Silver medal – second place	2011 Bled	Lwt single sculls
Silver medal – second place	2017 Sarasota	Lwt double sculls
Silver medal – second place	2018 Plovdiv	Lwt double sculls
Silver medal – second place	2019 Ottensheim	Lwt double sculls
Silver medal – second place	2022 Račice	Lwt double sculls
European Championships
Gold medal – first place	2010 Montemor-o-Velho	Lwt quad sculls
Gold medal – first place	2020 Poznań	Lwt double sculls
Silver medal – second place	2019 Lucerne	Lwt double sculls
Silver medal – second place	2022 Oberschleißheim	Lwt double sculls
Bronze medal – third place	2017 Račice	Lwt double sculls
Bronze medal – third place	2018 Glasgow	Lwt double sculls
Bronze medal – third place	2021 Varese	Lwt double sculls
Mediterranean Games
Gold medal – first place	2013 Mersin	Ltw single sculls
Gold medal – first place	2018 Tarragona	Lwt double sculls

Pietro Willy Ruta (born 6 August 1987) is an Italian rower. He competed in the men's lightweight double sculls with Elia Luini at the 2012 Summer Olympics, and in the men's lightweight coxless four at the 2016 Summer Olympics, finishing in 4th.

He won a bronze medal in the men's lightweight double sculls at the 2020 Summer Olympics with Stefano Oppo.

== Biography ==
At the World Championships, he won a silver medal in the men's lightweight double sculls in 2017, 2018 and 2019, and in the men's lightweight single sculls in 2011.
