= 2023 World Rowing Championships – Men's lightweight quadruple sculls =

Men's lightweight quadruple sculls at the 2023 World Rowing Championships
- Venue: Lake Sava
- Location: Belgrade, Serbia
- Dates: 5 September – 8 September
- Competitors: 12 from 3 nations
- Winning time: 6:29.42

Medalists
gold medal	Luca Borgonovo; Nicolò Demiliani; Pietro Ruta; Matteo Tonelli	Italy
silver medal	Max von Bülow; Simon Klüter; Fabio Kress; Joachim Agne	Germany

The men's lightweight quadruple sculls competition at the 2023 World Rowing Championships took place at Lake Sava, in Belgrade.

== Schedule ==
The schedule was as follows:

Date	Time	Round
Tuesday 5 September 2023	14:31	Heats
Friday 8 September 2023	15:37	Final

All times are Central European Summer Time (UTC+2)

== Results ==
=== Preliminary round ===
All boats advanced to the final.

Rank	Rower	Country	Time	Notes
1	Luca Borgonovo; Nicolò Demiliani; Pietro Ruta; Matteo Tonelli	Italy	6:15.88	F
2	Max von Bülow; Simon Klüter; Fabio Kress; Joachim Agne	Germany	6:23.15	F
3	Bernard Aparicio; Ian Richardson; Casey Howshall; Jamie Copus	United States	6:23.55	F

=== Final ===
The final determined the rankings.

Rank	Rower	Country	Time	Notes
1st place, gold medalist(s)	Luca Borgonovo; Nicolò Demiliani; Pietro Ruta; Matteo Tonelli	Italy	6:29.42	
2nd place, silver medalist(s)	Max von Bülow; Simon Klüter; Fabio Kress; Joachim Agne	Germany	6:37.83	
3	Bernard Aparicio; Ian Richardson; Casey Howshall; Jamie Copus	United States	6:43.82	
