= Eber Sanhueza =

Chilean rower (born 1998)

Personal information
- Born: 23 April 1998 (age 28) Puerto Montt, Chile
- Education: Andrés Bello National University
- Height: 1.71 m (5 ft 7 in)

Sport
- Sport: Rowing
- Club: CD Nauticos Estrella Blanca
Medal record
Men's rowing
Representing Chile
Pan American Games
Silver medal – second place	2023 Santiago	Lwt double sculls
Bronze medal – third place	2019 Lima	Lwt double sculls
South American Games
Gold medal – first place	2018 Barranquilla	Lwt double skulls
Silver medal – second place	2018 Barranquilla	Quadruple skulls

Eber Sanhueza Rojas (born 23 April 1998) is a Chilean rower who competed in the men's lightweight double skulls event at the 2020 Summer Olympics.

== Career ==
Sanhueza was set to compete at the 2016 World Championships, but he was pulled from the competition to replace an injured Chilean teammate at the 2016 World U23 Championships, placing tenth in the coxless four event.

At the 2018 South American Games, he won a gold medal in the lightweight double skulls with Felipe Cárdenas and a silver medal in the quadruple skulls with Cárdenas, César Abaroa, and Bernardo Guerrero.

Sanhueza began competing with Abaroa in the lightweight double skulls event in 2017. They finished seventh at the 2017 World U23 Championships, and improved to a fourth-place finish at the 2018 edition. The pair placed 20th at the 2018 World Championships in Bulgaria, then won a bronze medal at the 2019 Pan American Games in Peru.

In March 2021, Sanhueza and Abaroa finished second in the lightweight double skulls event at the American Olympic Qualification Regatta, securing Chile's boat in the event at the delayed 2020 Summer Olympics. A few days later the Chilean Rowing Federation selected the duo ahead of Felipe Cárdenas, who also finished second in his single skulls race, for the Olympic slot.
