= Jonathan Rommelmann =

German rower

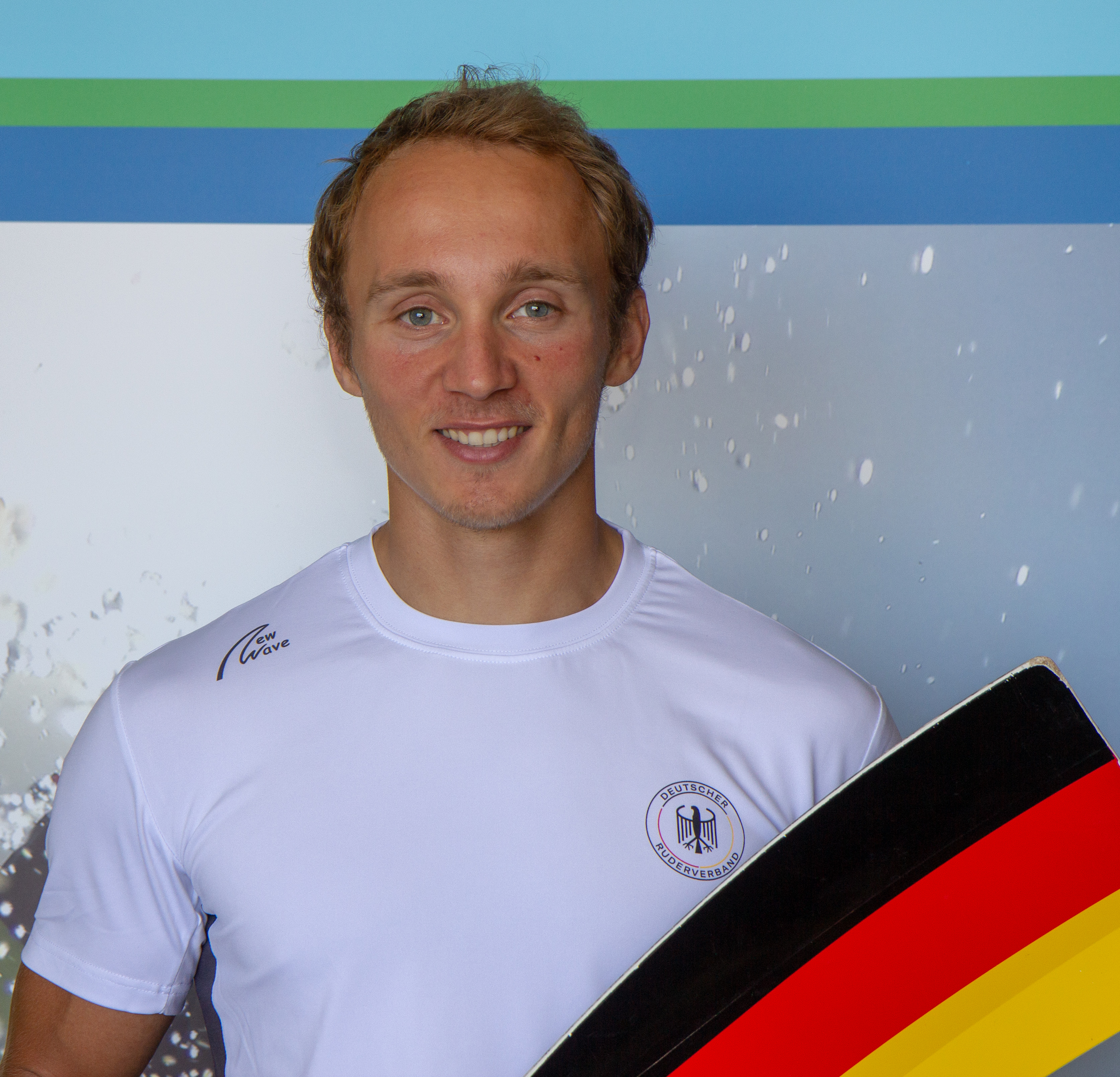
- Rommelmann in 2018

Personal information
- Nationality: German
- Born: 18 December 1994 (age 31) Mülheim, Germany
- Height: 1.78 m (5 ft 10 in)
- Weight: 70 kg (154 lb)

Sport
- Country: Germany
- Sport: Rowing
- Event: Lightweight double sculls
- Club: Crefelder Ruder-Club 1883 e.V.
Medal record
Men's rowing
Representing Germany
Olympic Games
Silver medal – second place	2020 Tokyo	Lwt double sculls
World Championships
Bronze medal – third place	2019 Ottensheim	Lwt double sculls

Jonathan Rommelmann (born 18 December 1994) is a German rower.

He won a medal at the 2019 World Rowing Championships.
