= Miroslav Vraštil Sr. =

Miroslav Vraštil
Personal information
- Born: 31 July 1951 (age 74) Olomouc, Czechoslovakia
- Relatives: Miroslav Vraštil Jr. (son)

Sport
- Country: Czechoslovakia
- Sport: Rowing
Medal record
European Rowing Championships
Silver medal – second place	1973 Moscow	Eight
World Rowing Junior Championships
Gold medal – first place	1969 Napoli	Eight

Miroslav Vraštil (Czech pronunciation: [ˈmɪroslav ˈvraʃcɪl]; born 31 July 1951) is a Czech retired rower and triple Olympian who represented Czechoslovakia. His son, Miroslav Vraštil Jr., is also an Olympic rower. In 2010, Vraštil senior set the world record for finishing the most Ironman Triathlon races within one year – 22.

== Rowing ==
Vraštil was born in 1951 in Olomouc, Czechoslovakia. He started rowing in his home town aged 12. At the 1969 World Rowing Junior Championships in Italy, he won gold with the junior men's eight. At the 1971 European Rowing Championships in Denmark, he came seventh with the men's eight.

In the 1972 Summer Olympics in Munich, Germany, he competed in the men's eight with the team coming tenth. At the 1973 European Rowing Championships in Moscow, he won a silver medal in the men's eight competition. In the 1975 World Rowing Championships, he came fourth with the men's eight. He competed in Montreal in the 1976 Summer Olympics in the men's eight, where the team came sixth.

In the 1978 World Rowing Championships in New Zealand, he changed to the men's four boat and the team came fifth. At the 1980 Summer Olympics in Moscow, he was the stroke of the coxless pair, and he came fifth with Miroslav Knapek. In the 1981 World Rowing Championships in Germany, he was fourth in the men's four event.

A tumour in his right leg was diagnosed later in 1981. His doctors wanted to amputate the leg at the groin, but he insisted that the tumour be removed instead. Three months after the operation, the tumour stopped growing. He did not undertake any training for six months, but started again in the spring of 1982. Later that year, he came fourth in the 1982 World Rowing Championships, where he competed in the men's four. In the following year, he competed with the men's four at the 1983 World Rowing Championships in Duisburg, Germany, where the team came fifth. His fourth Olympic appearance was prevented through the 1984 Summer Olympics boycott.

== Retirement ==
After he finished his competitive rowing career, he worked as a rowing coach for five years. In 1993, Vraštil became a school teacher.

== Triathlon ==
In 1988, Vraštil entered his first triathlon and of 130 competitors, he was almost last. He had lost his fitness after ten years with little exercise. He became more competitive in the event and in 2010, he embarked on the attempt to beat the world record of finishing more than 20 Ironman Triathlon races within one year. He managed the feat and completed 22 races during 2010.

== Family ==
Vraštil is married with five children. His two eldest children, Miroslav Vraštil Jr. and a daughter, are also competitive rowers. His son has competed at the 2012 and 2016 Summer Olympics for the Czech Republic.
