= Leon Chambers =

American-born Australian rower

Personal information
- Born: 17 April 1998 (age 28)
- Years active: 2018-current

Sport
- Sport: Rowing
- Club: Sydney University Boat Club

Leon Chambers (born 17 April 1998) is an American-born Australian representative rower. He was twice an Australian U23 national champion and represented in the lightweight double-scull at the 2019 World Rowing Championships.

== Club and state rowing ==
Chambers' senior club rowing in Australia is from the Sydney University Boat Club.

In 2018 in SUBC colours, Chambers contested and won the U23 men's lightweight single scull and the lightweight double scull title (with Matthew Curtin) at the Australian Rowing Championships.

== International representative rowing ==
Chambers made his Australian representative debut at the 2018 World Rowing Cup III in Lucerne in a lightweight double scull . In 2019 with Hamish Parry, Chambers raced in Australia's lightweight double scull at both World Rowing Cups in Europe and was then selected to contest the 2019 World Rowing Championships in Linz, Austria. The double was looking for a top seven finish at the 2019 World Championships to qualify for the Tokyo Olympics. They placed second in the B-final for an overall eighth place finish and failed to qualify the boat for Tokyo 2020.
