= Hamish Parry =

Australian rower

Personal information
- Born: 3 April 1994 (age 32)
- Years active: 2013-current
- Height: 180 cm (5 ft 11 in)
- Weight: 71 kg (157 lb)

Sport
- Sport: Rowing
- Club: Toowong Rowing Club

Hamish Parry (born 3 April 1994) is a former Australian representative lightweight rower. He was a nine-time national champion in both sculling and sweep-oared crews and has sculled at underage and senior world championships from 2013 to 2021.

== Club and state rowing ==
Parry attended St Joseph’s Gregory Terrace in Brisbane where he took up rowing. Parry's senior club rowing has been from the Toowoong Rowing Club in Queensland.

His state representative debut for Queensland came in 2016 in the lightweight four which contested and won the Penrith Cup at the Interstate Regatta. He rowed in further Queensland lightweight fours racing for the Penrith Cup in 2017, 2018 and 2019. He stroked those crews in 2018 and 2019.

In 2015 and 2016 Parry won the open lightweight men's eight national titles rowing in composite Queensland crews at the Australian Rowing Championships. In 2017 in Toowong colours Parry contested four national open lightweight titles at the Australian Championships: the LM4X, the LM2-, the LM4-. He stroked each of those crews and all finished second.

In 2018 Parry rowed in Toowong colours in composite Queensland lightweight crews for the national double scull, quad scull and coxless pair titles. He won the LM4X and the LM4- championships. The 2019 Australian Championships saw Parry win the national titles in the lightweight single scull, the lightweight quad scull and in a composite Australian selection eight, the lightweight men's eight.

== International representative rowing ==
Parry made his Australian representative debut at the 2013 World Rowing Cup I in Sydney where he rowed in both a lightweight coxless four (to fourth place) and the B Australian eight (to fifth place). That same year he was selected to race at the World Rowing U23 Championships in Linz where he stroked the Australian lightweight coxless four to an overall twelfth place. In 2014 he was again picked for the World Rowing U23 Championships in Varese where he stroked the coxless pair with John Armitage to sixth place in the final. Parry and Armitage stayed together as Australia's lightweight pair for the 2015 World Rowing U23 Championships in Plovdiv. They finished in seventh place.

In 2017 Parry moved into Australia's senior lightweight squad and into the quad scull. They rowed in the heavyweight event at the World Rowing Cup II in Poznan and then in as a lightweight quad at the World Rowing Cup III in Lucerne where they rowed to a fifth placing. The same crew went on to the 2017 World Rowing Championships in Sarasota where they finished twelfth.

In 2018 Parry was selected as Australia's senior lightweight sculler. He rowed at the World Rowing Cup II in Linz and then won a silver medal at the WRC III in Lucerne. Then at the 2018 World Rowing Championships in Plovdiv he rowed to ninth place. In 2019 with Leon Chambers, Parry raced in Australia's lightweight double scull at both World Rowing Cups in Europe and was then selected to contest the 2019 World Rowing Championships in Linz, Austria. The double were looking for a top seven finish at the 2019 World Championships to qualify for the Tokyo Olympics. They placed second in the B-final for an overall eighth place finish and failed to qualify the boat for Tokyo 2020. Before those delayed Tokyo Olympics at the final Olympic qualification regatta in Lucerne, Switzerland in May 2021 and now paired with Sean Murphy, he raced an Australian representative lightweight double, again attempting to qualify that boat. They made their final, but missed the Olympic cut-off.
