= Andrew Campbell (rower) =

American rower (born 1992)

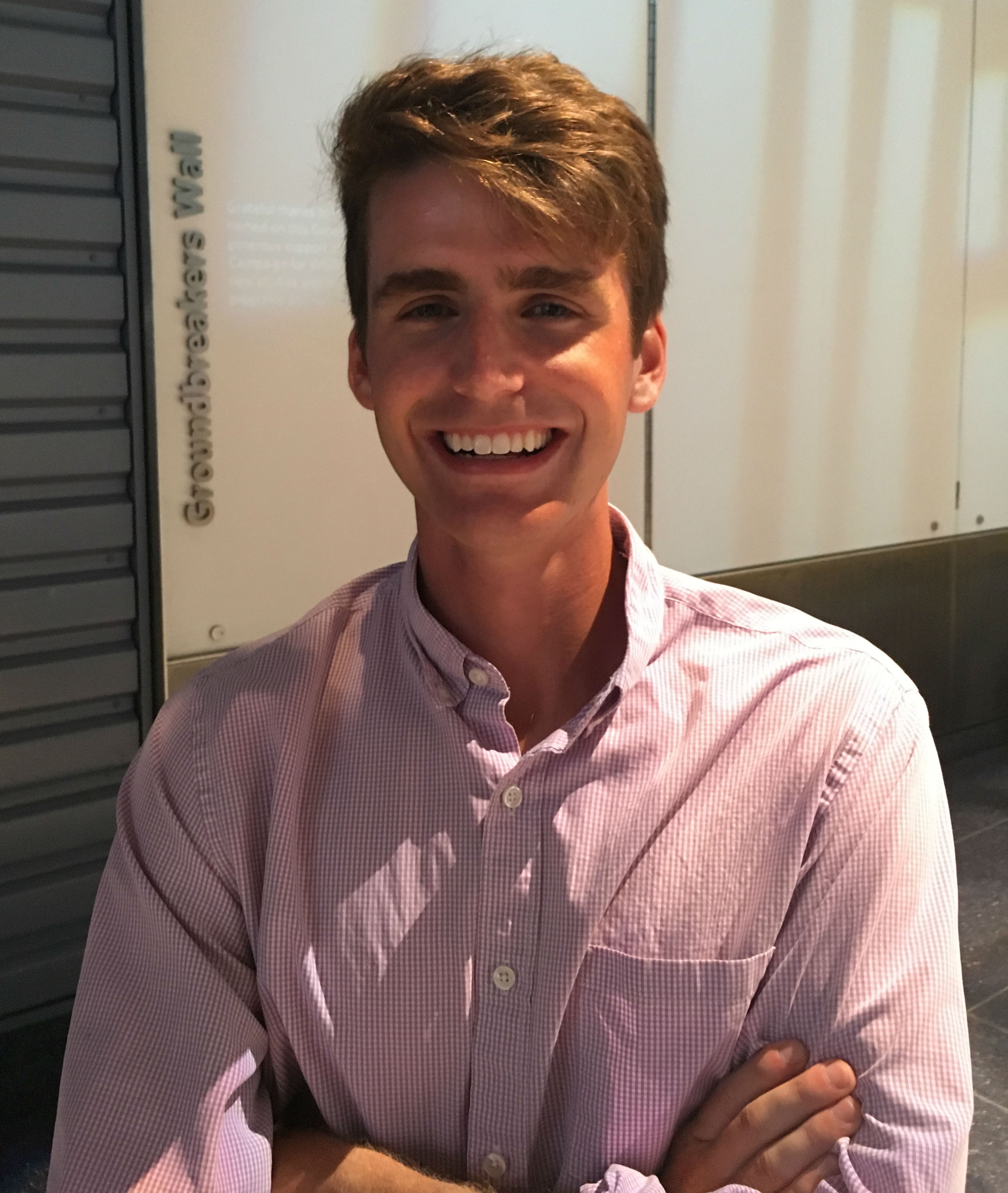
- Campbell at the WGBH television and radio studios in June 2016

Personal information
- Nationality: United States
- Born: February 2, 1992 (age 34) Barrington, Illinois
Medal record
Men's rowing
World Championships
Bronze medal – third place	2012 Plovdiv	Men's lightweight single
Bronze medal – third place	2018 Plovdiv	Men's lightweight single

Andrew Campbell (born February 2, 1992) is an American rower. He graduated from Harvard University in 2014. He is a two time bronze medalist in the lightweight men's single scull, two time World Champion in the U23 lightweight men's single scull, and U19 bronze medalist in the men's single scull. In 2014 he set the current best time for the Head Of The Charles regatta "Championship Singles" event with a time of 17:11.646.

Campbell competed in the men's lightweight double sculls event at the 2016 Summer Olympics., finishing 5th.
