= Manel Balastegui =

Spanish rower

Personal information
- Full name: Manel Balastegui Riguillo
- Nationality: Spain
- Born: 30 November 1999 (age 25)
- Height: 1.85 m (6 ft 1 in)

Sport
- Sport: Rowing

Manel Balastegui Riguillo (born 30 November 1999) is a Spanish rower. He competed in the 2020 Summer Olympics.
