= Patricio Rojas =

Chilean politician (1933–2021)

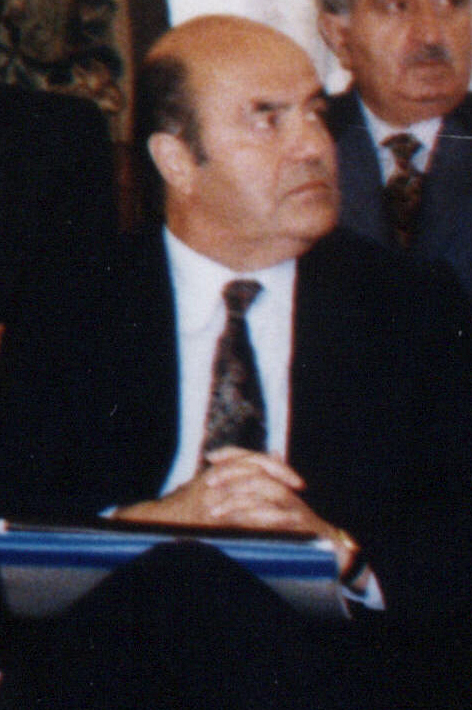

Ministry of National Defense
- In office 11 March 1990 – 11 March 1994
- President: Patricio Aylwin
- Preceded by: Patricio Carvajal
- Succeeded by: Edmundo Pérez Yoma

Minister of the Interior
- In office 10 July 1969 – 3 November 1970
- President: Eduardo Frei Montalva
- Preceded by: Edmundo Pérez Zujovic
- Succeeded by: José Tohá

Personal details
- Born: 28 January 1933 Santiago, Chile
- Died: 27 May 2021 (aged 88)
- Party: Christian Democratic Party
- Occupation: physician, surgeon and politician

Patricio Rojas (28 January 1933 – 27 May 2021) was a Chilean physician, surgeon and politician. As a politician he was minister of the interior (1969–1970) and national defence (1990–1994).

Rojas died on 27 May 2021, aged 88.

== Family and education ==
The son of Diego Rojas and María Saavedra, he married María Antonieta Olmedo Quero in 1959, with whom he had five children.

He studied at the Liceo de Aplicación in the capital and later at the University of Chile, from which he obtained the degree of surgeon physician in 1957.

He died in the city of Santiago on 27 May 2021.

== Political career ==
He served as director of the Medical and Dental Service (Semda) for students at the University of Chile. At the same institution, he held the position of president of the Student Council of the Faculty of Medicine, which marked his first political activity.

In 1957, he became president of the Federation of Students of the University of Chile (FECh), the same year in which the Christian Democratic Party was founded, a party in which he remained a member until his death. His presidency of the student federation initiated a ten-year period during which members of the JDC held the federation’s leadership.

During the administration of President Eduardo Frei Montalva, he was appointed Undersecretary (1964–1967) and later acting Minister of Education (1967–1969). In the latter role, he became a co-founder of the National Commission for Scientific and Technological Research (CONICYT) in 1967. Following the resignation of Edmundo Pérez Zujovic in 1969, he was appointed Minister of the Interior, a position he held until the end of the government of Eduardo Frei Montalva.

With Patricio Aylwin already in power, in March 1990 he was appointed Minister of Defense. During this period, he faced a difficult situation in having under his hierarchical authority the outgoing ruler, General Augusto Pinochet, who continued to serve as Commander-in-Chief of the Chilean Army.

His final public role was during the first government of Michelle Bachelet, who appointed him president of the Board of Directors of the State-Owned Enterprises System (SEP) of CORFO on 11 March 2006. He left this position on 27 March 2008, following his firm defense of the dismissed president of the State Railways Company of Chile (EFE), Luis Ajenjo, who had been accused of embezzlement and was a political ally of his. This episode led to his estrangement from Senator Adolfo Zaldívar.

== Academic career ==
In the academic field, he served as an assistant professor at the Faculty of Medicine, University of Chile, as a research professor in charge of the Development and Transfer Program of the University of Chile (1973–1975), and as president of the Executive Commission of the Inter-American Council on Education, Science, and Culture (1967 and 1970–1973).

He was also an international consultant on scientific, technological, and educational matters for the World Bank and the Inter-American Development Bank (1975–1990).

He represented the Presidency of the Republic on the University Council of the University of Chile during the governments of Ricardo Lagos and Michelle Bachelet.
