= Peter Zelinka =

Slovak biathlete (1957–2021)

Personal information
- Nationality: Slovak
- Born: 1 May 1957; Bratislava, Czechoslovakia
- Died: 27 October 2021 (aged 64)

Sport
- Sport: Biathlon

Peter Zelinka (1 May 1957 – 27 October 2021) was a Slovak biathlete. He competed at the 1980 Winter Olympics and the 1984 Winter Olympics. Zelinka died on 27 October 2021, at the age of 64.
