= Matthew Dunham =

New Zealand rower (born 1994)

Personal information
- Born: 15 August 1994 (age 31)
- Height: 1.78 m (5 ft 10 in)

Sport
- Sport: Rowing
Medal record
Men's rowing
Representing New Zealand
World Championships
Silver medal – second place	2017 Sarasota	Lwt single sculls

Matthew Dunham (born 15 August 1994) is a New Zealand rower.

== Biography ==
Dunham was born in 1994 in Takapuna, New Zealand. He received his secondary education at St Peter's School in Cambridge, New Zealand, and is a member of the Cambridge Rowing Club. He completed a Bachelor of Management Studies at the University of Waikato.

Dunham represented New Zealand at the January 2013 Australian Youth Olympic Festival in Sydney, Australia. In the single sculls, he came 15th out of 18 competitors. In the quadruple sculls, he won a bronze medal with his team. In the eight, he won a silver medal. He also competed at the July 2013 Summer Universiade in Kazan, Russia. His first international appearance at a FISA regatta was at the 2014 World Rowing U23 Championships in Varese, Italy, where he came ninth in the U23 lightweight double sculls partnered with Toby Cunliffe-Steel. At the 2015 World Rowing U23 Championships in Plovdiv, Bulgaria, he came fourth in the U23 lightweight double sculls partnered with Bryce Abernethy.

Dunham went to the 2016 Summer Olympics in Rio de Janeiro, Brazil, as a reserve for the lightweight men's four but did not compete.

In 2017, he won the Diamond Challenge Sculls (the premier event for single sculls) at the Henley Royal Regatta. Later that year, at the 2017 World Rowing Championships in Sarasota, Florida, the first year he competed at elite level, he won a silver medal in the lightweight single sculls; he stated afterwards that he was happy to have even made it into the A-final. Dunham would prefer to row in the lightweight double sculls instead of the single, as the double is an Olympic event; his aim is to make it to the 2020 Summer Olympics.
