= Artur Mikołajczewski =

Polish rower (born 1990)

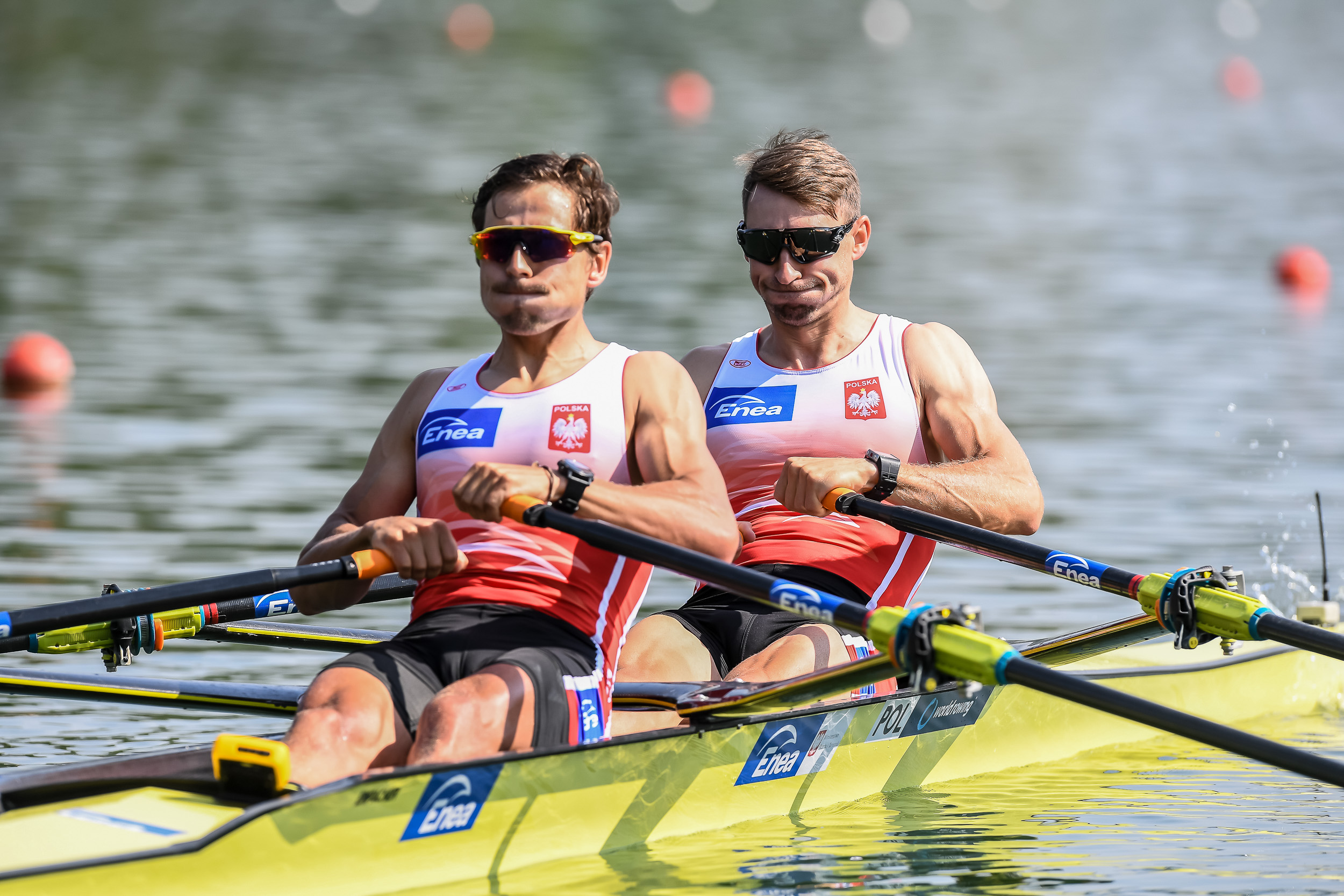
- Mikołajczewski (left) with Jerzy Kowalski in 2019

Personal information
- Nationality: Polish
- Born: 27 June 1990 (age 36) Inowrocław, Poland
- Height: 1.80 m (5 ft 11 in)
- Weight: 73 kg (161 lb)

Sport
- Country: Poland
- Sport: Rowing
Medal record
Men's rowing
Representing Poland
World Championships
Gold medal – first place	2012 Plovdiv	Lwt quad sculls
Bronze medal – third place	2023 Belgrade	Lwt single sculls
European Championships
Silver medal – second place	2019 Lucerne	Lwt single sculls

Artur Mikołajczewski (born 27 June 1990) is a Polish competitive rower.

He competed at the 2016 Summer Olympics in Rio de Janeiro, in the men's lightweight double sculls.
