= Tim Brys =

Belgian rower (born 1992)

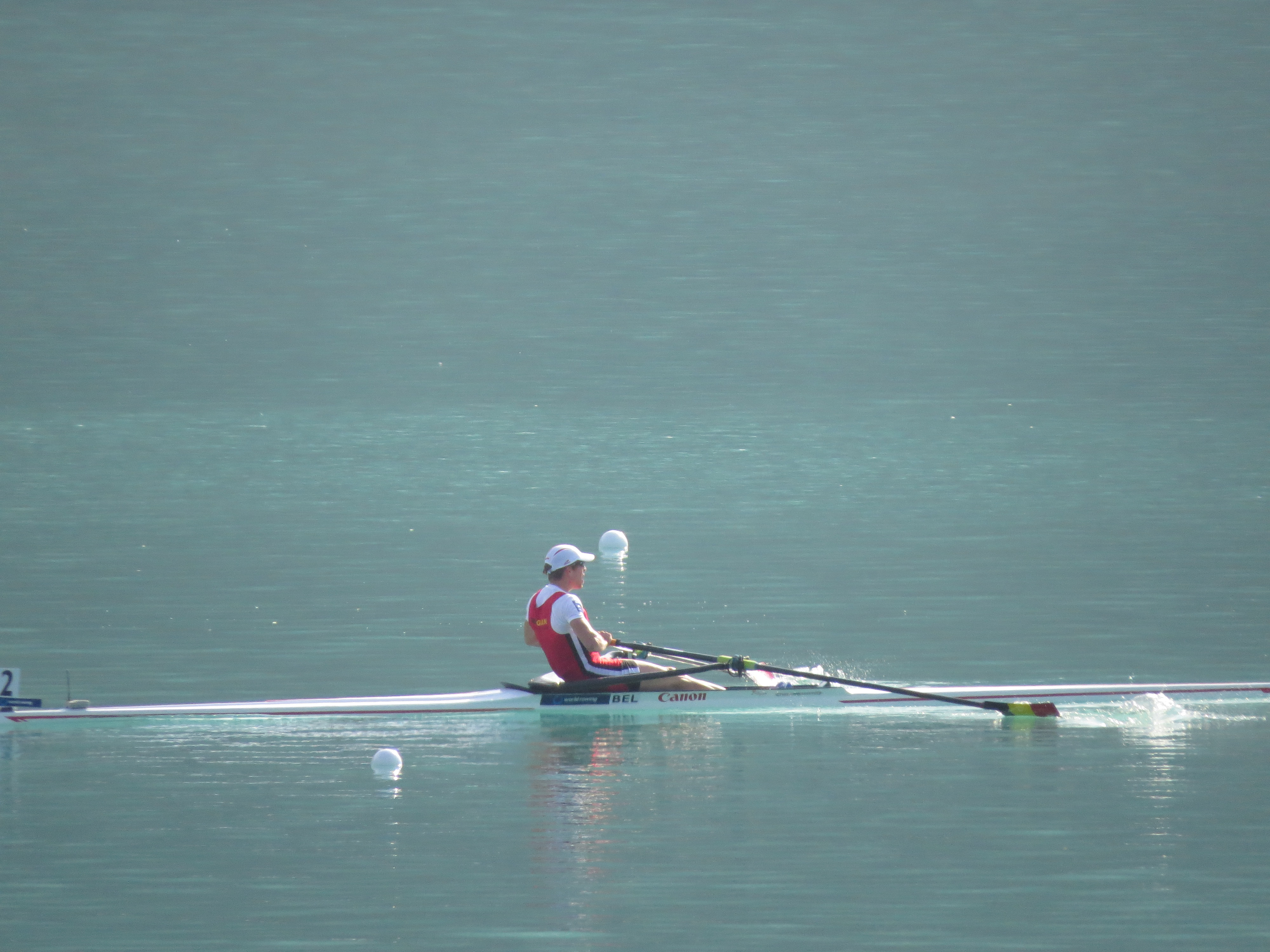
- Brys in 2015

Personal information
- Nationality: Belgian
- Born: 30 July 1992 (age 33) Ghent, Belgium

Sport
- Sport: Rowing
Medal record
Men's rowing
Representing Belgium
World Championships
Bronze medal – third place	2018 Plovdiv	LM2x
European Championships
Bronze medal – third place	2020 Poznan	Lwt double sculls

Tim Brys (born 30 July 1992) was a Belgian competitive rower. He competed at the 2020 Summer Olympics in Tokyo 2021, in men's lightweight double sculls. He ended his career, aged 32, at the Henley Royal Regatta on July 5th, 2025.
