= Sun Man (rower) =

Chinese rower (born 1995)

Personal information
- Nationality: Chinese
- Born: 22 August 1995 (age 30)

Sport
- Sport: Rowing
Medal record
Men's rowing
Representing China
World Championships
Gold medal – first place	2025 Shanghai	Lwt double sculls
Silver medal – second place	2022 Račice	Lwt quad sculls
Bronze medal – third place	2017 Sarasota	Lwt double sculls
Asian Games
Gold medal – first place	2022 Hangzhou	Lwt double sculls

Sun Man (Chinese: 孙满; pinyin: Sūn Mǎn, born 22 August 1995) is a Chinese rower. He competed in the men's lightweight double sculls event at the 2016 Summer Olympics.
