= Miłosz Jankowski =

Polish rower (born 1990)

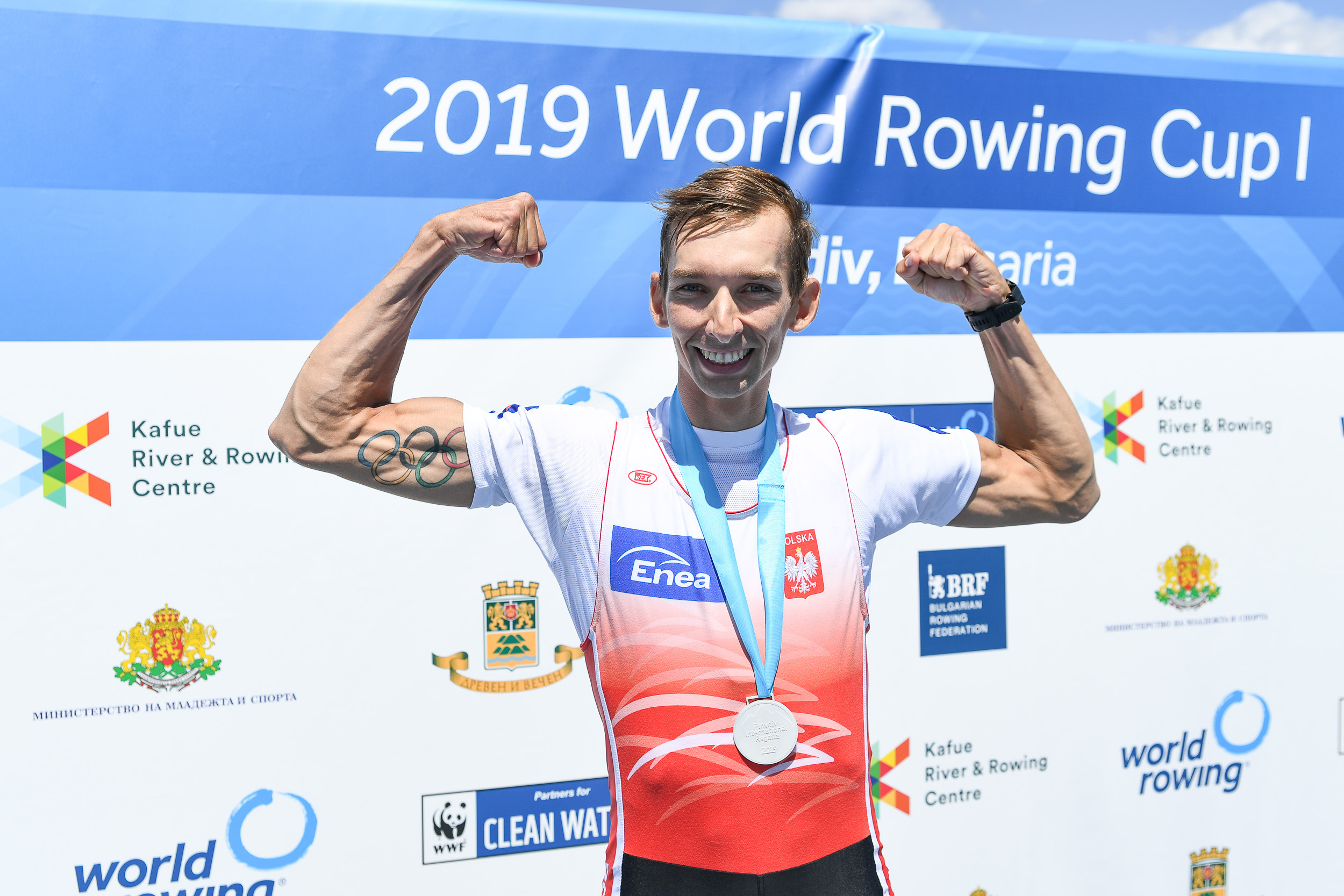

Personal information
- Nationality: Polish
- Born: 17 January 1990 (age 36)

Sport
- Sport: Rowing

Miłosz Jankowski (born 17 January 1990) is a Polish competitive rower.

He competed at the 2016 Summer Olympics in Rio de Janeiro, in the men's lightweight double sculls.
