= Niels Van Zandweghe =

Belgian rower

Personal information
- Nationality: Belgian
- Born: 28 February 1996 (age 30) Bruges, Belgium

Sport
- Sport: Rowing
- Club: BTR- Bruges
Medal record
Men's rowing
Representing Belgium
World Championships
Bronze medal – third place	2018 Plovdiv	LM2x
European Championships
Bronze medal – third place	2020 Poznan	Lwt double sculls

Niels Van Zandweghe (born 28 February 1996) is a Belgian competitive rower, born in Bruges. He competed at the 2020 and 2024 Summer Olympics, in men's lightweight double sculls.
