= Pierre Houin =

French rower

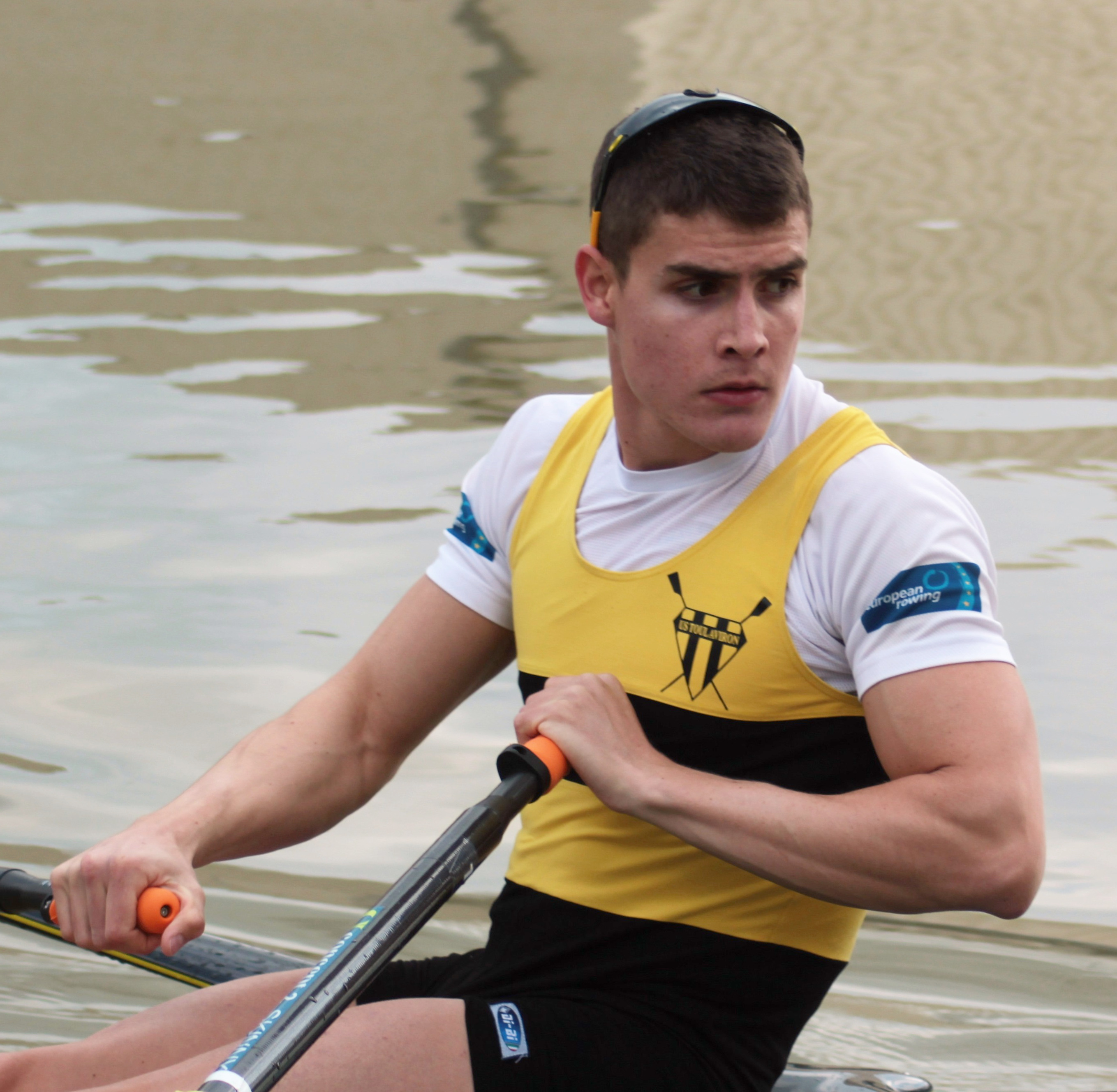
- Houin in 2016

Personal information
- Born: 15 April 1994 (age 32) Toul, France
- Education: IUT Charlemagne, Nancy
- Height: 182 cm (6 ft 0 in)
- Weight: 74 kg (163 lb)

Sport
- Sport: Rowing
- Club: US Toul
- Coached by: Alexis Besançon
Medal record
Men's rowing
Representing France
Olympic Games
Gold medal – first place	2016 Rio de Janeiro	Lwt double sculls
World Championships
Gold medal – first place	2015 Aiguebelette	Lwt quad sculls
Gold medal – first place	2017 Sarasota	Lwt double sculls
European Championships
Gold medal – first place	2015 Poznań	Lwt single sculls
Gold medal – first place	2017 Račice	Lwt double sculls

Pierre Houin (born 15 April 1994) is a French rower. He won the gold medal in the lightweight sculls at the 2015 European Championships, 2015 World Championships and 2016 Olympics.

Houin took up rowing aged 11 at l'Union Sportive de Toul following his brother, who won a national title in 2004. He has a tattoo on his chest saying "amat victoria curam" (victory loves carefulness).
