= Andri Struzina =

Swiss rower

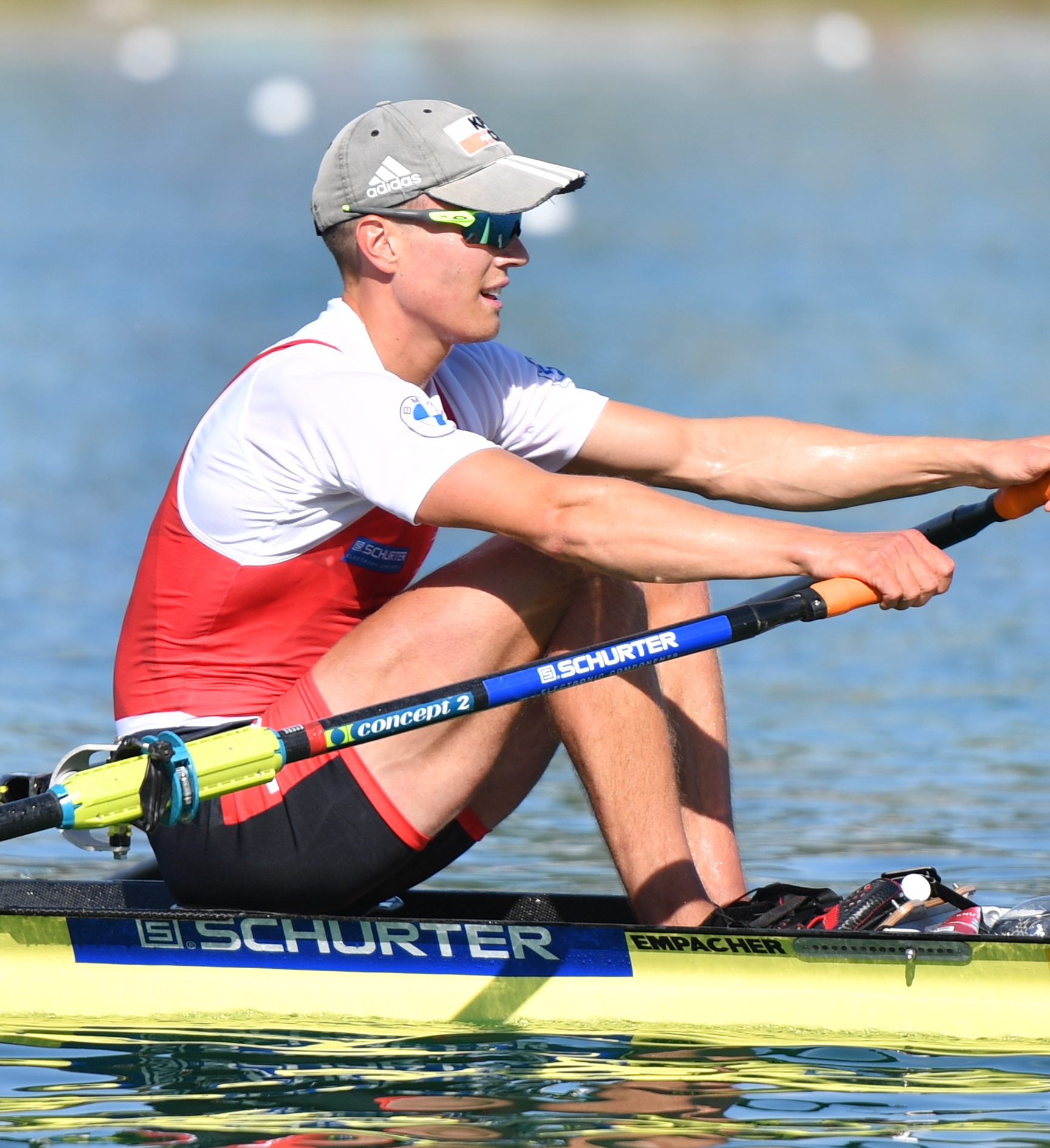

Personal information
- Nationality: Swiss
- Born: 26 May 1997 (age 29)

Sport
- Country: Switzerland
- Sport: Rowing
- Event: Lightweight
Medal record
Men's rowing
Representing Switzerland
World Rowing Championships
Gold medal – first place	2023 Belgrade	LM1x
European Rowing Championships
Bronze medal – third place	2023 Bled	LM1x
Bronze medal – third place	2022 Munich	LM1x

Andri Struzina (born 26 May 1997) is a Swiss rower. He won the gold medal in the lightweight single sculls at the 2023 World Rowing Championships. In his very little freetime, he hosts a Podcast called Voll Ine with his mate Oscar Sarmiento, where they talk about sports and everything in-between.
