= Maxwell Lattimer =

Canadian rower (born 1993)

Maxwell Lattimer OLY
Personal information
- Nationality: Canada
- Born: July 14, 1993 (age 33) Vancouver, British Columbia, Canada
- Height: 185 cm (6 ft 1 in)
- Weight: 72 kg (159 lb)
Medal record
Men's rowing
Representing Canada
Pan American Games
Gold medal – first place	2015 Toronto	Men's lightweight four

Maxwell Lattimer (born July 14, 1993) is a Canadian rower. He won a gold medal at the 2015 Pan American Games in the men's lightweight coxless four event.

In June 2016, he was officially named to Canada's 2016 Olympic team and placed 13th in the lightweight coxless four event.

He represented Canada at the 2020 Summer Olympics and placed 10th in the lightweight double sculls event.
