= Are Strandli =

Norwegian rower (born 1988)

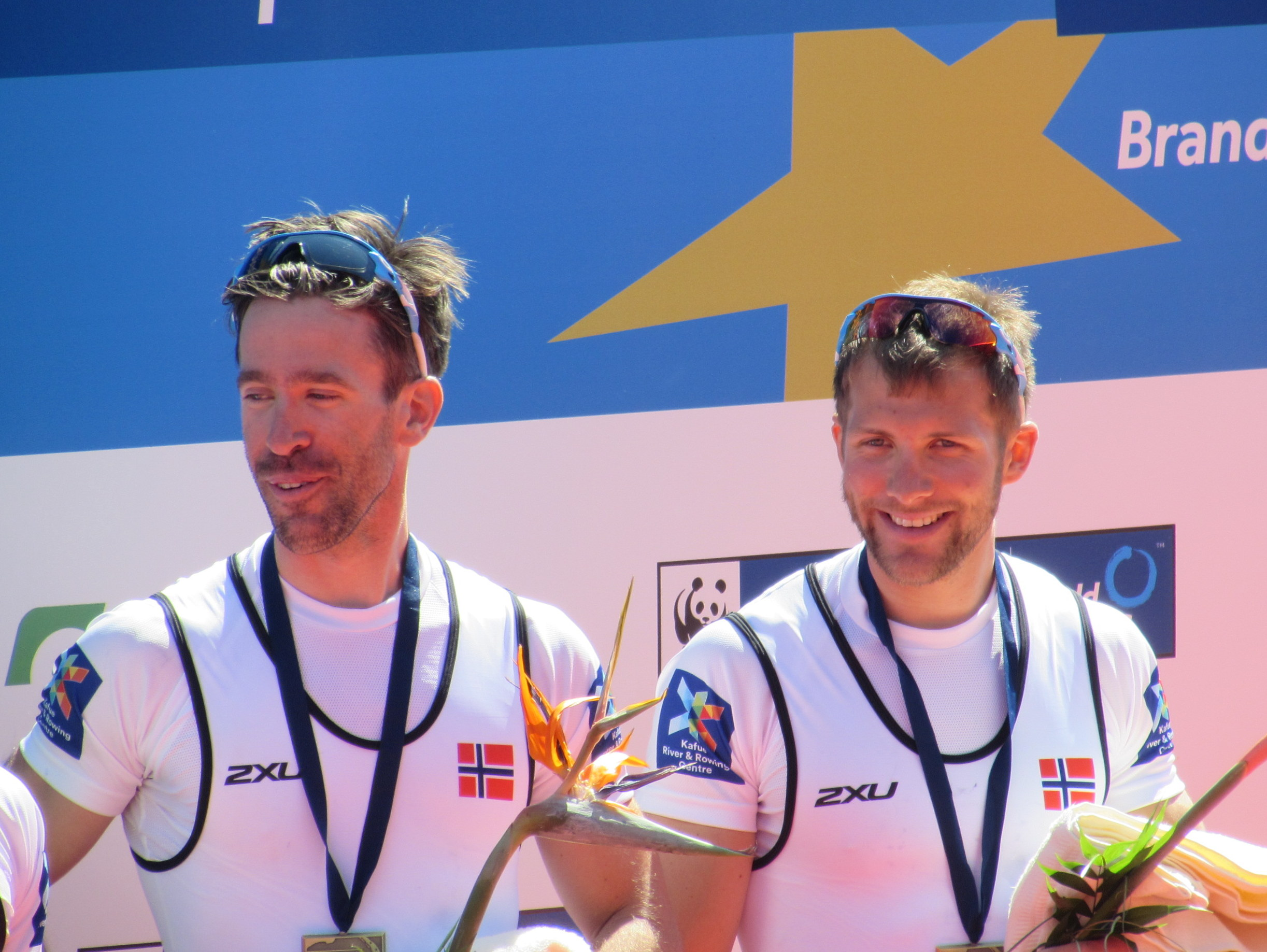
- Strandli (left) and Kristoffer Brun in 2016

Personal information
- Full name: Are Weierholt Strandli
- Born: 18 August 1988 (age 37) Stavanger, Norway
- Height: 181 cm (5 ft 11 in)
- Weight: 69 kg (152 lb)

Sport
- Club: Stavanger RK
Medal record
Men's rowing
Representing Norway
Olympic Games
Bronze medal – third place	2016 Rio de Janeiro	LM2x
World Championships
Gold medal – first place	2013 Chungjiu	LM2x
Bronze medal – third place	2014 Amsterdam	LM2x
Bronze medal – third place	2015 Aiguebelette	LM2x
European Championships
Bronze medal – third place	2014 Belgrade	LM2x

Are Weierholt Strandli (born 18 August 1988, in Stavanger) is a Norwegian rower. He competed at the 2012 Summer Olympics in London, finishing ninth in the lightweight double sculls with Kristoffer Brun, and won a bronze medal in the same event at the 2016 Summer Olympics.
