= Pedro Fraga =

Portuguese rower

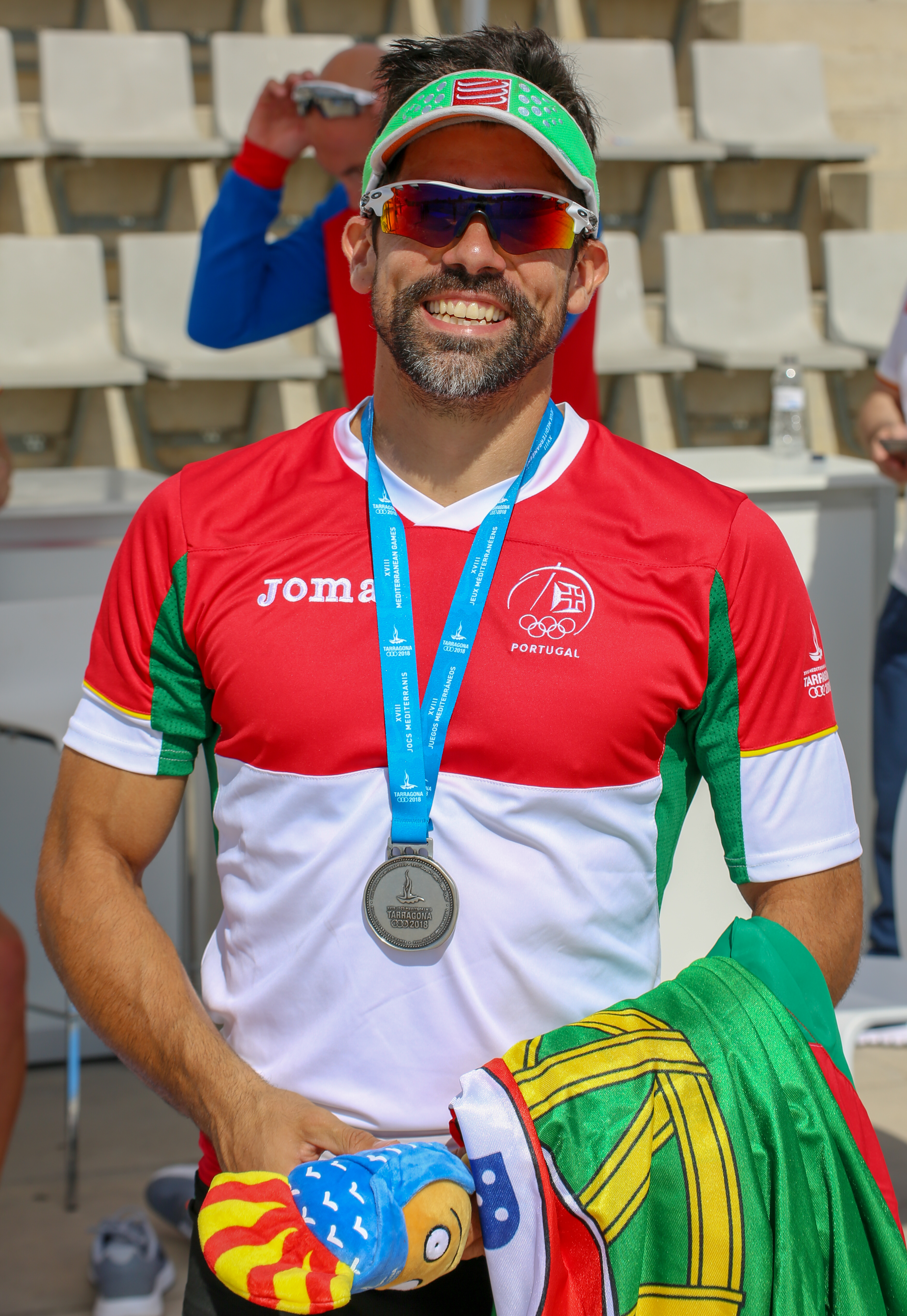
- Fraga in 2018

Medal record

Men's rowing

Representing Portugal

European Championships
Gold medal – first place	2014 Belgrade	LM1x
Silver medal – second place	2010 Montemor-o-Velho	LM2x
Silver medal – second place	2012 Varese	LM2x
Silver medal – second place	2013 Seville	LM1x
Bronze medal – third place	2011 Plovdiv	LM2x

Mediterranean Games
Silver medal – second place	2018 Tarragona	LM1x

Pedro Diogo Rosas Cardoso Fraga (born 27 January 1983) is a Portuguese rower. He started competitive rowing in 1998 and currently represents Associação Académica de Coimbra. Competing in the lightweight double sculls category (LM2x) with Nuno Mendes, he finished in 5th place at the 2012 Summer Olympics in London, and won silver medals at the 2010 and 2012 European Rowing Championships.

According to a post made by himself in April 2012, he achieved 7.02L of O2 consumption in a VO2max test, meaning a 92.45 ml/min/kg for his current bodyweight of 75,9 kg at the time.

On 20 January 2013 at the ErgoHead a 20-minute ergo race he rowed 6180 m at a pace of 1:37:1 taking second place, 17 m behind the Danish Steffen Bond (who beat his previous world record 1:37:3 by setting a new maximum of 6197 m in 1:36:8)

On 26 January 2013 he performed a 6:08:7 (Portuguese Lightweight record) in the 2000 m semi-finals ergo race in the Indoor European Championship (Kettwig, Nordrhein-Westfalen) where he won the following day with a 6:11:0.
