= Afonso Costa (rower) =

Portuguese rower

Personal information
- Full name: Afonso Duarte Costa
- Nationality: Portuguese
- Born: 20 March 1996 (age 30) Lisbon, Portugal
- Height: 1.80 m (5 ft 11 in)
- Weight: 72 kg (159 lb)

Sport
- Country: Portugal
- Sport: Rowing
Medal record
| Event | 1st | 2nd | 3rd |
|---|---|---|---|
| Mediterranean Games | 0 | 0 | 1 |
| Total | 0 | 0 | 1 |
Mediterranean Games
| Bronze medal – third place | 2018 Tarragona | LM2x |

Afonso Duarte Costa (born 20 March 1996) is a Portuguese rower. He competed in the 2020 Summer Olympics. He won the bronze medal at the 2018 Mediterranean Games in Tarragona with Dinis Costa in lightweight double sculls.
