= Kristoffer Brun =

Norwegian rower (born 1988)

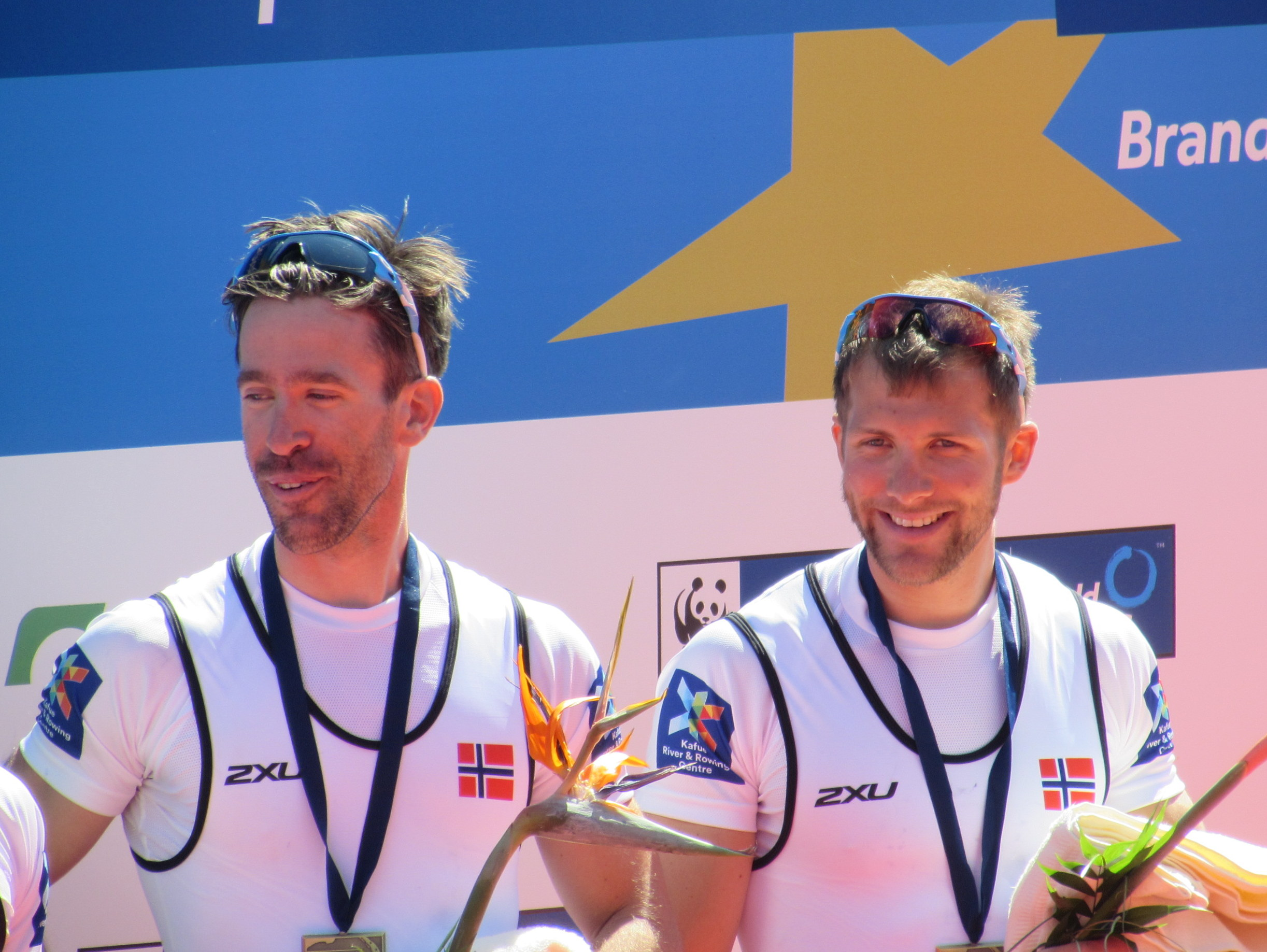
- Brun (right) and Are Strandli in 2016

Personal information
- Born: 7 April 1988 (age 38) Bergen, Norway
- Height: 175 cm (5 ft 9 in)
- Weight: 70 kg (154 lb)
Medal record
Men's rowing
Representing Norway
Olympic Games
Bronze medal – third place	2016 Rio de Janeiro	Lwt double sculls
World Championships
Gold medal – first place	2013 Chungju	Lwt double sculls
Bronze medal – third place	2014 Amsterdam	Lwt double sculls
Bronze medal – third place	2015 Aiguebelette	Lwt double sculls
Bronze medal – third place	2017 Sarasota	Lwt single sculls
European Championships
Gold medal – first place	2020 Poznan	Lwt single sculls
Silver medal – second place	2013 Sevilla	Lwt double sculls
Bronze medal – third place	2014 Belgrade	Lwt double sculls
Bronze medal – third place	2015 Poznań	Lwt double sculls
Bronze medal – third place	2016 Brandenburg	Lwt double sculls

Kristoffer Brun (born 7 April 1988) is a Norwegian rower. He competes in lightweight single sculls and in lightweight double sculls along with teammate Are Strandli.

== Career ==
Brun competed at the 2012 Summer Olympics in London in the men's lightweight double sculls with teammate Are Strandli. They teamed again to win the bronze medal in that event at the 2016 Olympics.

The team are also world champions in their event, at the 2013 World Championships in Chungjiu. They have also won world championships bronze twice. At European level, the team of Brun and Strandli have won one silver and three bronzes.

Brun won a gold medal in lightweight single sculls (LM1x) at the 2020 European Rowing Championships.
