= Jiří Šimánek (rower) =

Czech rower

Personal information
- Nationality: Czech
- Born: 11 October 1995 (age 30)
- Height: 1.80 m (5 ft 11 in)

Sport
- Country: Czech Republic
- Sport: Rowing

Jiří Šimánek (born 11 October 1995) is a Czech rower. He competed in the 2020 Summer Olympics, held July–August 2021 in Tokyo.
