= César Abaroa =

Chilean rower (born 1996)

Personal information
- Full name: César David Abaroa Pérez
- Born: 18 November 1996 (age 29) Concepción, Chile
- Height: 1.79 m (5 ft 10 in)

Sport
- Country: Chile
- Sport: Rowing
Medal record
Men's rowing
Representing Chile
Pan American Games
| Silver medal – second place | 2023 Santiago | Lightweight double sculls |
| Bronze medal – third place | 2019 Lima | Lightweight double sculls |

César David Abaroa Pérez (born 18 November 1996) is a Chilean rower. He competed in the 2020 Summer Olympics. He won the silver medal in the lightweight double sculls at the 2023 Pan American Games.
