= Miroslav Vraštil Jr. =

Czech rower

Miroslav Vraštil
Personal information
- Nationality: Czech
- Born: 17 October 1982 (age 43) Olomouc, Czechoslovakia
- Height: 184
- Weight: 73
- Relatives: Miroslav Vraštil Sr. (father)

Sport
- Country: Czech Republic
- Sport: Rowing
- Club: ASC Dukla Praha
- Team: ASC Dukla Praha
- Coached by: Michal Vabroušek

Achievements and titles
- Olympic finals: London, Rio, Tokyo, Paris
- Highest world ranking: 4.
Medal record
Men's rowing
Representing Czech Republic

Miroslav Vraštil (Czech pronunciation: [ˈmɪroslav ˈvraʃcɪl]; born 17 October 1982) is a Czech rower. He competed in the men's lightweight coxless four event at both the 2012 and 2016 Summer Olympics; he came eleventh in 2012 and twelfth in 2016. His father, Miroslav Vraštil Sr., represented Czechoslovakia at the Olympics in 1972, 1976, and 1980.
