= Jerzy Kowalski (rower) =

Polish rower

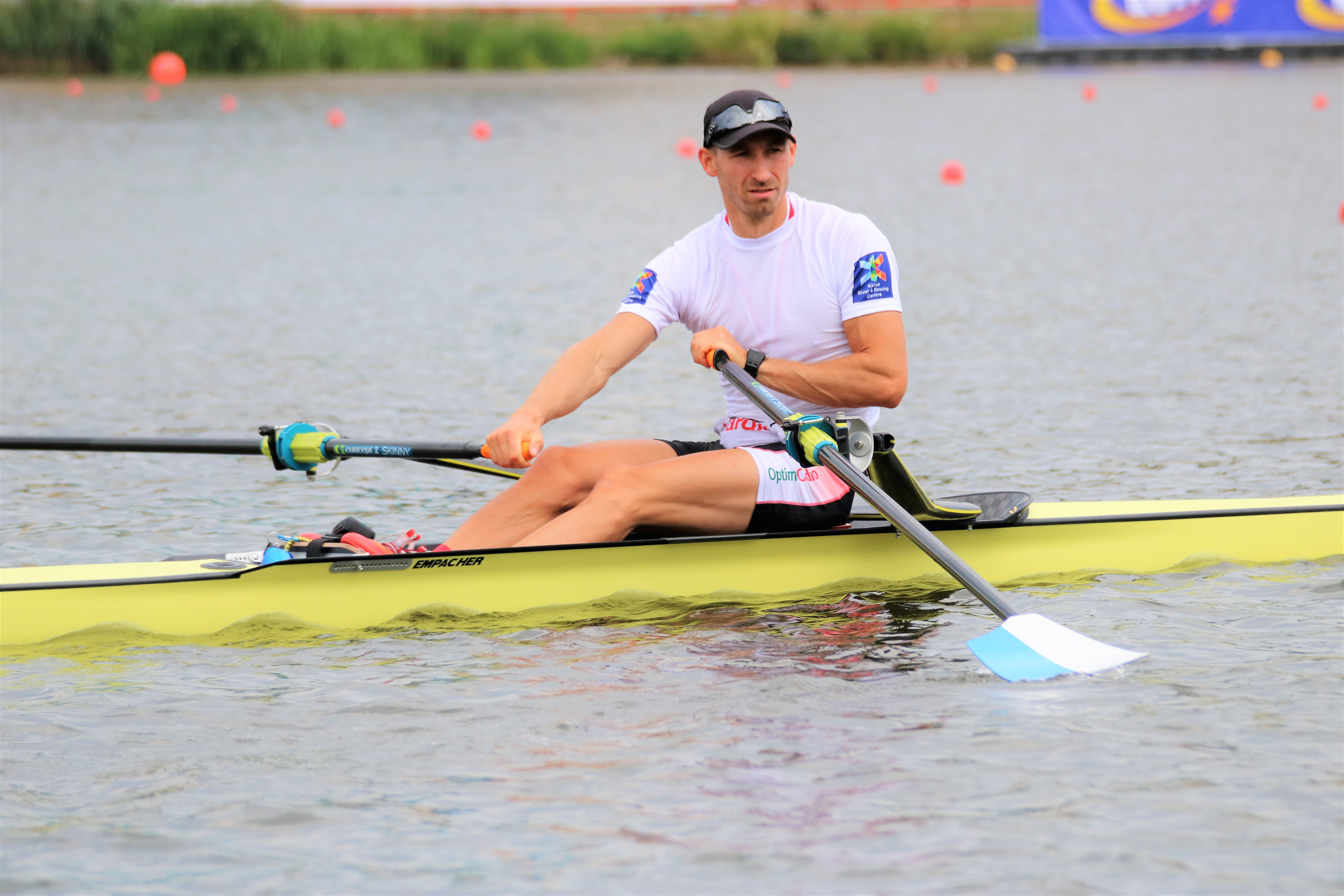
- Jerzy Kowalski

Personal information
- Nationality: Poland
- Born: 23 February 1988 (age 38)
- Height: 1.83 m (6 ft 0 in)

Sport
- Sport: Rowing

Jerzy Kowalski (born 23 February 1988) is a Polish rower. He competed in the 2020 Summer Olympics.
