= Rowing Ireland =

Governing body for rowing sports on the island of Ireland

- Sport: Rowing
- Jurisdiction: Ireland
- Founded: 1899
- Affiliation: World Rowing
- Affiliation date: 1948
- Headquarters: National Rowing Centre, Cork
- President: Jane Williams

Official website
- www.rowingireland.ie
- (Republic of Ireland)

Rowing Ireland, formerly the Irish Amateur Rowing Union, is the governing body of rowing for Ireland. It is a cross-border organisation administering the sport in both the Republic of Ireland and Northern Ireland.

Rowing Ireland is a member of the Olympic Council of Ireland and the Fédération Internationale des Sociétés d’Aviron (FISA).

== Membership ==
Over 100 clubs are affiliated to Rowing Ireland. These are from across the island and include schools, third level institutions and open clubs.

In 2019 Rowing Ireland launched its strategy until 2024. This has four pillars: Supporting clubs, High Performance, Rowing for all and Leading our sport.

== National Rowing Centre ==
The National Rowing Centre (NRC) in Farran Wood, County Cork is the headquarters of Rowing Ireland and is also the base of the High Performance team. The centre has an eight-lane Albano course and hosts a number of regattas and the Championship Regatta each year. Every four years it hosts the Home International Regatta. It hosted the Coupe de la Jeunesse in 1999, 2008 and 2018.

== Irish Championships ==
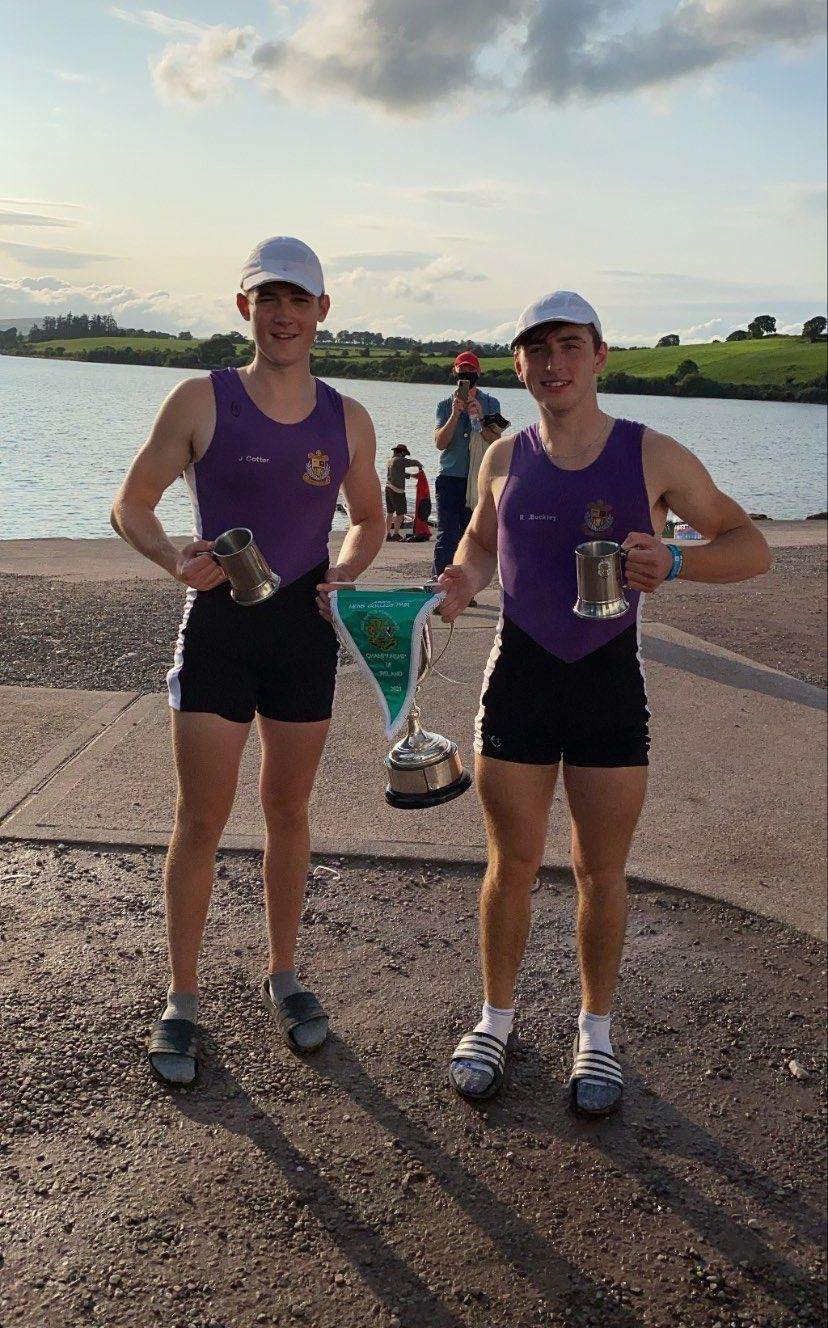
Presentation Brothers College, winners of the Junior pair 2021.

Established in 1899 as the Irish Amateur Rowing Union, the association hosted its first championship in 1912. At the 1912 AGM, which was held in February, it was agreed that a cup be purchased for £100 for the Union to be presented for annual competition amongst senior eights. This would in time become known as "The Big Pot". The inaugural Senior eights championship took place at Metropolitan Regatta in Ringsend on the Lower Liffey in July 1912 and City of Derry Boating Club were the winners. It would be 1934 before the Junior (Intermediate) eights championship was added. Since then many additional championships have been added and 44 are now contested each year at the Championship Regatta. In 2017 it added the Irish Offshore Rowing Championship and in 2018 the inaugural Irish Coastal Rowing Championships took place. The results of all championships can be found at www.irishrowingarchives.com

== National team ==
Rowing Ireland is responsible for the selection and management of the Irish national team, through its High Performance programme. Crews are selected for regattas such as the Olympic Games, World Rowing Championships, European Rowing Championships, and the World Rowing Cup.

== Olympics and Paralympics ==
=== Olympics ===
Ireland first sent a boat to an Olympic regatta to the 1948 Summer Olympics, where they sent a men's eight. The IARU received its affiliation from FISA on the 3rd of August, 1948, two days before the start of the regatta, allowing Ireland to send a crew.

Ireland would not appear at an Olympic regatta until 1972, when Seán Drea entered the men's single sculls, coming seventh. Ireland would go on to field at least one crew at every Olympic regatta except 1984. Four years later, Drea came fourth in the same event.

At the 1996 Summer Olympics, the crew in the men's lightweight coxless four consisting of Derek Holland, Sam Lynch, Neville Maxwell and Tony O'Connor also came fourth.

It was not until 2016, when brothers Gary and Paul O'Donovan broke through and won Ireland's first Olympic medal in rowing: a silver in the men's lightweight double sculls. The O'Donovans' relaxed interview style endeared followers and they became internet sensations in the wake of their success, and they were invited on to The Graham Norton Show for its 2016 New Year's Eve special.

At the delayed 2020 Summer Olympics, Ireland entered thirteen athletes across six boats. The women's coxless four, consisting of Emily Hegarty, Aifric Keogh, Eimear Lambe, and Fiona Murtagh, won a bronze medal, and Paul O'Donovan joined Fintan McCarthy to win Ireland's first rowing gold in the men's lightweight double sculls.

For the 2024 Summer Olympics, Ireland qualified sixteen athletes across seven boats, more than any other Olympic regatta. Paul O'Donovan and Fintan McCarthy successfully retained their gold medal in the men's lightweight double sculls, the last time the event would be held in an Olympic regatta, and Philip Doyle and Daire Lynch won a bronze medal in the men's double sculls.

=== Medal table ===
Games	Event	Rower(s)	Club	Medal
(Brazil) Rio de Janeiro 2016	LM2x	Gary O'Donovan	Skibbereen Rowing Club	(silver) Silver
(Brazil) Rio de Janeiro 2016	LM2x	Paul O'Donovan	UCD Boat Club	(silver) Silver
(Japan) Tokyo 2020	LM2x	Fintan McCarthy	Skibbereen Rowing Club	(gold) Gold
(Japan) Tokyo 2020	LM2x	Paul O'Donovan	UCC Rowing Club	(gold) Gold
(Japan) Tokyo 2020	W4-	Aifric Keogh	UCC Rowing Club	(bronze) Bronze
(Japan) Tokyo 2020	W4-	Eimear Lambe	UCD Ladies Boat Club	(bronze) Bronze
(Japan) Tokyo 2020	W4-	Fiona Murtagh	NUIG Boat Club	(bronze) Bronze
(Japan) Tokyo 2020	W4-	Emily Hegarty	UCC Rowing Club	(bronze) Bronze
(France) Paris 2024	LM2x	Fintan McCarthy	Skibbereen Rowing Club	(gold) Gold
(France) Paris 2024	LM2x	Paul O'Donovan	Skibbereen Rowing Club	(gold) Gold
(France) Paris 2024	M2x	Philip Doyle	Belfast Boat Club	(bronze) Bronze
(France) Paris 2024	M2x	Daire Lynch	Clonmel Rowing Club	(bronze) Bronze

=== Paralympics ===
At the 2012 Summer Paralympics, Ireland fielded a crew in the mixed coxed four. For the 2024 Summer Paralympics, Ireland fielded a crew in the PR2 mixed double sculls.

== World Championships ==
Ireland has won twenty gold, twelve silver and eighteen bronze medals at the World Rowing Championships.

=== Gold medallists ===
Year	Event	Rower(s)	Club
(Austria) Vienna 1991	LM1x	Niall O'Toole	Commercial Rowing Club
(Switzerland) Lucerne 2001	LM1x	Sam Lynch	St Michael's Rowing Club
(Switzerland) Lucerne 2001	LW1x	Sinead Jennings	(Scotland) St Andrew Boat Club
(Switzerland) Lucerne 2001	LM2-	Gearoid Towey	Neptune Rowing Club
(Switzerland) Lucerne 2001	LM2-	Tony O'Connor	Neptune Rowing Club
(Spain) Seville 2002	LM1x	Sam Lynch	St Michael's Rowing Club
(Netherlands) Rotterdam 2016	LM1x	Paul O'Donovan	UCD Boat Club
(United States) Sarasota 2017	LM2-	Mark O'Donovan	Skibbereen Rowing Club
(United States) Sarasota 2017	LM2-	Shane O'Driscoll	Skibbereen Rowing Club
(United States) Sarasota 2017	LM1x	Paul O'Donovan	Skibbereen Rowing Club
(Bulgaria) Plovdiv 2018	LM2x	Gary O'Donovan	Skibbereen Rowing Club
(Bulgaria) Plovdiv 2018	LM2x	Paul O'Donovan	Skibbereen Rowing Club
(Bulgaria) Plovdiv 2018	W1x	Sanita Pušpure	Old Collegians Boat Club
(Austria) Ottensheim 2019	LM2x	Fintan McCarthy	Skibbereen Rowing Club
(Austria) Ottensheim 2019	LM2x	Paul O'Donovan	Skibbereen Rowing Club
(Austria) Ottensheim 2019	W1x	Sanita Pušpure	Old Collegians Boat Club
(Czech Republic) Račice 2022	LM2x	Fintan McCarthy	Skibbereen Rowing Club
(Czech Republic) Račice 2022	LM2x	Paul O'Donovan	UCC Rowing Club
(Czech Republic) Račice 2022	PR2W1x	Katie O'Brien	Galway Rowing Club
(Serbia) Belgrade 2023	LM2x	Fintan McCarthy	Skibbereen Rowing Club
(Serbia) Belgrade 2023	LM2x	Paul O'Donovan	UCC Rowing Club
(Serbia) Belgrade 2023	LW1x	Siobhán McCrohan	Tribesmen Rowing Club
(Canada) St. Catherine's 2024	LM1x	Paul O'Donovan	Skibbereen Rowing Club
(China) Shanghai 2025	W1x	Fiona Murtagh	University of Galway Boat Club
(China) Shanghai 2025	Mix2x	Margaret Cremen	UCC Rowing Club
(China) Shanghai 2025	Mix2x	Fintan McCarthy	Skibbereen Rowing Club
(Netherlands) Amsterdam 2026	W2X	Margaret Cremen	Lee Rowing Club
(Netherlands) Amsterdam 2026	W2X	Zoe Hyde	Tralee Rowing Club

== European Championships ==
The European Rowing Championships were re-established in 2007, after a hiatus dating to 1973. At these, Ireland has won six gold, six silver, and five bronze medals.

=== Gold medallists ===
Year	Event	Rower(s)	Club
(Germany) Brandenburg 2016	LM2x	Gary O'Donovan	Skibbereen Rowing Club
(Germany) Brandenburg 2016	LM2x	Paul O'Donovan	UCD Boat Club
(Czech Republic) Račice 2017	LM2-	Mark O'Donovan	Skibbereen Rowing Club
(Czech Republic) Račice 2017	LM2-	Shane O'Driscoll	Skibbereen Rowing Club
(Switzerland) Lucerne 2019	W1x	Sanita Pušpure	Old Collegians Rowing Club
(Poland) Poznań 2020	W1x	Sanita Pušpure	Old Collegians Rowing Club
(Italy) Varese 2021	LM2x	Fintan McCarthy	Skibbereen Rowing Club
(Italy) Varese 2021	LM2x	Paul O'Donovan	UCC Rowing Club
(Germany) Munich 2022	LM2x	Fintan McCarthy	Skibbereen Rowing Club
(Germany) Munich 2022	LM2x	Paul O'Donovan	UCC Rowing Club
