= 2023 World Rowing Championships – Men's lightweight double sculls =

Men's lightweight double sculls at the 2023 World Rowing Championships
- Venue: Lake Sava
- Location: Belgrade, Serbia
- Dates: 3 September – 9 September
- Competitors: 50 from 25 nations
- Winning time: 6:32.09

Medalists
gold medal	Fintan McCarthy; Paul O'Donovan	Ireland
silver medal	Jan Schäuble; Raphaël Ahumada	Switzerland
bronze medal	Stefano Oppo; Gabriel Soares	Italy

The men's lightweight double sculls competition at the 2023 World Rowing Championships took place at Lake Sava, in Belgrade.

== Schedule ==
The schedule was as follows:

Date	Time	Round
Sunday 3 September 2023	12:19	Heats
Monday 4 September 2023	13:10	Repechages
Wednesday 6 September 2023	12:50	Quarterfinals
Thursday 7 September 2023	10:35	Semifinals A/B
Thursday 7 September 2023	16:15	Semifinals C/D
Saturday 9 September 2023	09:51	Final D
Saturday 9 September 2023	10:19	Final C
Saturday 9 September 2023	11:40	Final B
Saturday 9 September 2023	14:23	Final A

All times are Central European Summer Time (UTC+2)

== Results ==
=== Heats ===
The four fastest boats in each heat advanced directly to the quarterfinals. The remaining boats were sent to the repechages.

==== Heat 1 ====
Rank	Rower	Country	Time	Notes
1	Fintan McCarthy; Paul O'Donovan	Ireland	6:15.40	QAD
2	Matthew Dunham; Christopher Stockley	New Zealand	6:19.65	QAD
3	Ihor Khmara; Stanislav Kovalov	Ukraine	6:27.67	QAD
4	Elar Loot; Ander Koppel	Estonia	6:30.98	QAD
5	Ibrahim Elserougy; Ahmed Abdelaal	Egypt	6:39.25	R

==== Heat 2 ====
Rank	Rower	Country	Time	Notes
1	Stefano Oppo; Gabriel Soares	Italy	6:17.14	QAD
2	Zachary Heese; James McCullough	United States	6:18.48	QAD
3	Enes Gök; Halil Kaan Köroğlu	Turkey	6:20.50	QAD
4	Petros Gkaidatzis; Antonios Papakonstantinou	Greece	6:21.47	QAD
5	Paul Ruttmann; Julian Schöberl	Austria	6:25.64	R

==== Heat 3 ====
Rank	Rower	Country	Time	Notes
1	Dennis Carracedo; Caetano Horta	Spain	6:16.98	QAD
2	Miguel Carballo; Alexis López	Mexico	6:18.78	QAD
3	Afonso Costa; Dinis Costa	Portugal	6:22.65	QAD
4	Mauricio Lopez Berocay; Felipe Klüver	Uruguay	6:22.85	QAD
5	Cal Gorvy; Daniel Dubitsky	Israel	7:06.40	R

==== Heat 4 ====
Rank	Rower	Country	Time	Notes
1	Paul Leerkamp; Jonathan Rommelmann	Germany	6:17.61	QAD
2	Hugo Beurey; Ferdinand Ludwig	France	6:20.54	QAD
3	Niels Van Zandweghe; Tibo Vyvey	Belgium	6:21.00	QAD
4	Shakhzod Nurmatov; Sobirjon Safaroliev	Uzbekistan	6:21.65	QAD
5	Fan Junjie; Sun Man	China	6:26.02	R

==== Heat 5 ====
Rank	Rower	Country	Time	Notes
1	Jan Schäuble; Raphaël Ahumada	Switzerland	6:11.93	QAD
2	Lars Benske; Ask Jarl Tjoem	Norway	6:13.94	QAD
3	Jiří Šimánek; Miroslav Vraštil	Czech Republic	6:14.76	QAD
4	Sean Murphy; Oscar McGuinness	Australia	6:20.63	QAD
5	Jerzy Kowalski; Daniel Galeza	Poland	6:27.19	R

=== Repechage ===
The four fastest boats advanced to the quarterfinals. The remaining boat are eliminated.

Rank	Rower	Country	Time	Notes
1	Jerzy Kowalski; Daniel Galeza	Poland	6:47.93	QAD
2	Fan Junjie; Sun Man	China	6:50.33	QAD
3	Paul Ruttmann; Julian Schöberl	Austria	7:03.30	QAD
4	Ibrahim Elserougy; Ahmed Abdelaal	Egypt	7:15.01	QAD
5	Cal Gorvy; Daniel Dubitsky	Israel	7:24.06	

=== Quarterfinals ===
The three fastest boats in Quarterfinal advanced to the AB semifinals. The remaining boats were sent to the CD semifinals.

==== Quarterfinal 1 ====
Rank	Rower	Country	Time	Notes
1	Fintan McCarthy; Paul O'Donovan	Ireland	6:46.53	SA/B
2	Stefano Oppo; Gabriel Soares	Italy	6:49.83	SA/B
3	Niels Van Zandweghe; Tibo Vyvey	Belgium	6:52.82	SA/B
4	Sean Murphy; Oscar McGuinness	Australia	6:53.65	SC/D
5	Afonso Costa; Dinis Costa	Portugal	6:56.88	SC/D
6	Ahmed Abdelaal; Ibrahim Elserougy	Egypt	7:32.58	SC/D

==== Quarterfinal 2 ====
Rank	Rower	Country	Time	Notes
1	Dennis Carracedo; Caetano Horta	Spain	6:48.68	SA/B
2	Jiří Šimánek; Miroslav Vraštil	Czech Republic	6:48.87	SA/B
3	Fan Junjie; Sun Man	China	6:49.17	SA/B
4	Petros Gkaidatzis; Antonios Papakonstantinou	Greece	6:49.30	SC/D
5	Hugo Beurey; Ferdinand Ludwig	France	7:01.78	SC/D
6	Ihor Khmara; Stanislav Kovalov	Ukraine	7:05.38	SC/D

==== Quarterfinal 3 ====
Rank	Rower	Country	Time	Notes
1	Lars Benske; Ask Jarl Tjoem	Norway	6:51.36	SA/B
2	Paul Leerkamp; Jonathan Rommelmann	Germany	6:53.23	SA/B
3	Matthew Dunham; Christopher Stockley	New Zealand	6:54.92	SA/B
4	Mauricio Lopez Berocay; Felipe Klüver	Uruguay	6:57.10	SC/D
5	Enes Gök; Halil Kaan Köroğlu	Turkey	7:01.47	SC/D
6	Paul Ruttmann; Julian Schöberl	Austria	7:14.78	SC/D

==== Quarterfinal 4 ====
Rank	Rower	Country	Time	Notes
1	Jan Schäuble; Raphaël Ahumada	Switzerland	6:52.35	SA/B
2	Jerzy Kowalski; Daniel Galeza	Poland	6:58.92	SA/B
3	Miguel Carballo; Alexis López	Mexico	7:00.76	SA/B
4	Zachary Heese; James McCullough	United States	7:03.24	SC/D
5	Elar Loot; Ander Koppel	Estonia	7:06.84	SC/D
6	Shakhzod Nurmatov; Sobirjon Safaroliev	Uzbekistan	7:17.99	SC/D

=== Semifinals C/D ===
The fastest three boats in each Semifinal advanced to the C final. The remaining boats were sent to the D final.

==== Semifinal 1 ====
Rank	Rower	Country	Time	Notes
1	Sean Murphy; Oscar McGuinness	Australia	6:55.92	FC
2	Mauricio Lopez Berocay; Felipe Klüver	Uruguay	6:56.00	FC
3	Elar Loot; Ander Koppel	Estonia	7:04.12	FC
4	Shakhzod Nurmatov; Sobirjon Safaroliev	Uzbekistan	7:09.34	FD
5	Ahmed Abdelaal; Ibrahim Elserougy	Egypt	7:34.79	FD
	Hugo Beurey; Ferdinand Ludwig	France	DNS	

==== Semifinal 2 ====
Rank	Rower	Country	Time	Notes
1	Petros Gkaidatzis; Antonios Papakonstantinou	Greece	6:53.81	FC
2	Enes Gök; Halil Kaan Köroğlu	Turkey	6:55.92	FC
3	Afonso Costa; Dinis Costa	Portugal	6:57.31	FC
4	Zachary Heese; James McCullough	United States	6:58.03	FD
5	Ihor Khmara; Stanislav Kovalov	Ukraine	7:02.79	FD
6	Paul Ruttmann; Julian Schöberl	Austria	7:08.94	FD

=== Semifinals A/B ===
The fastest three boats in each Semifinal advanced to the A final. The remaining boats were sent to the B final.

==== Semifinal 1 ====
Rank	Rower	Country	Time	Notes
1	Fintan McCarthy; Paul O'Donovan	Ireland	6:41.83	FA
2	Jiří Šimánek; Miroslav Vraštil	Czech Republic	6:47.98	FA
3	Lars Benske; Ask Jarl Tjoem	Norway	6:48.85	FA
4	Miguel Carballo; Alexis López	Mexico	6:53.89	FB
5	Niels Van Zandweghe; Tibo Vyvey	Belgium	6:55.95	FB
6	Jerzy Kowalski; Daniel Galeza	Poland	7:00.79	FB

==== Semifinal 2 ====
Rank	Rower	Country	Time	Notes
1	Jan Schäuble; Raphaël Ahumada	Switzerland	6:42.73	FA
3	Dennis Carracedo; Caetano Horta	Spain	6:48.50	FA
2	Stefano Oppo; Gabriel Soares	Italy	6:47.23	FA
4	Fan Junjie; Sun Man	China	6:53.56	FB
5	Matthew Dunham; Christopher Stockley	New Zealand	6:55.64	FB
6	Paul Leerkamp; Jonathan Rommelmann	Germany	9:54.74	FB

=== Finals ===
The A final determined the rankings for places 1 to 6. Additional rankings were determined in the other finals.

==== Final D ====
Rank	Rower	Country	Time	Total rank
1	Zachary Heese; James McCullough	United States	6:20.66	19
2	Paul Ruttmann; Julian Schöberl	Austria	6:26.27	20
3	Shakhzod Nurmatov; Sobirjon Safaroliev	Uzbekistan	6:32.02	21
4	Ahmed Abdelaal; Ibrahim Elserougy	Egypt	6:47.15	22
	Ihor Khmara; Stanislav Kovalov	Ukraine	DNS	

==== Final C ====
Rank	Rower	Country	Time	Total rank
1	Petros Gkaidatzis; Antonios Papakonstantinou	Greece	6:17.79	13
2	Enes Gök; Halil Kaan Köroğlu	Turkey	6:19.74	14
3	Mauricio Lopez Berocay; Felipe Klüver	Uruguay	6:20.38	15
4	Sean Murphy; Oscar McGuinness	Australia	6:20.79	16
5	Afonso Costa; Dinis Costa	Portugal	6:21.21	17
6	Elar Loot; Ander Koppel	Estonia	6:33.05	18

==== Final B ====
Rank	Rower	Country	Time	Total rank
1	Miguel Carballo; Alexis López	Mexico	6:26.49	7
2	Niels Van Zandweghe; Tibo Vyvey	Belgium	6:28.49	8
3	Matthew Dunham; Christopher Stockley	New Zealand	6:28.66	9
4	Paul Leerkamp; Jonathan Rommelmann	Germany	6:31.08	10
5	Jerzy Kowalski; Daniel Galeza	Poland	6:32.56	11
6	Fan Junjie; Sun Man	China	6:32.82	12

==== Final A ====
Rank	Rower	Country	Time
1st place, gold medalist(s)	Fintan McCarthy; Paul O'Donovan	Ireland	6:32.09
2nd place, silver medalist(s)	Jan Schäuble; Raphaël Ahumada	Switzerland	6:34.38
3rd place, bronze medalist(s)	Stefano Oppo; Gabriel Soares	Italy	6:34.77
4	Jiří Šimánek; Miroslav Vraštil	Czech Republic	6:38.01
5	Dennis Carracedo; Caetano Horta	Spain	6:40.65
6	Lars Benske; Ask Jarl Tjoem	Norway	6:42.23
