= 2022 World Rowing Championships – Men's lightweight double sculls =

Men's lightweight double sculls at the 2022 World Rowing Championships
- Venue: Labe aréna
- Location: Račice, Czech Republic
- Dates: 18 September – 24 September
- Competitors: 58 from 29 nations
- Winning time: 6:16.46

Medalists
| gold medal | Fintan McCarthy; Paul O'Donovan | Ireland |
| silver medal | Pietro Ruta; Stefano Oppo | Italy |
| bronze medal | Stanislav Kovalov; Ihor Khmara | Ukraine |

The men's lightweight double sculls competition at the 2022 World Rowing Championships took place at the Račice regatta venue.

== Schedule ==
The schedule was as follows:

| Date | Time | Round |
|---|---|---|
| Sunday 18 September 2022 | 11:51 | Heats |
| Monday 19 September 2022 | 16:47 | Repechages |
| Wednesday 21 September 2022 | 11:04 | Quarterfinals |
| Wednesday 21 September 2022 | 12:35 | Final E |
| Thursday 22 September 2022 | 11:25 | Semifinals A/B |
| Thursday 22 September 2022 | 15:40 | Semifinals C/D |
| Saturday 24 September 2022 | 10:12 | Final D |
| Saturday 24 September 2022 | 10:48 | Final C |
| Saturday 24 September 2022 | 12:12 | Final B |
| Saturday 24 September 2022 | 14:23 | Final A |

All times are Central European Summer Time (UTC+2)

== Results ==
=== Heats ===
The four fastest boats in each heat advanced directly to the quarterfinals. The remaining boats were sent to the repechages.

==== Heat 1 ====
| Rank | Rower | Country | Time | Notes |
|---|---|---|---|---|
| 1 | Pietro Ruta; Stefano Oppo | Italy | 6:19.96 | Q |
| 2 | Afonso Costa; Dinis Costa | Portugal | 6:20.18 | Q |
| 3 | Alexander Modest; Rasmus Lind | Denmark | 6:24.94 | Q |
| 4 | Jasper Liu; Zachary Heese | United States | 6:26.03 | Q |
| 5 | Enes Göki; Şefik Çakmaki | Turkey | 6:34.54 | R |
| 6 | Boucif Mohammed Belhadj; Mohamed Abderraouf Djouimai | Algeria | 7:03.73 | R |

==== Heat 2 ====
| Rank | Rower | Country | Time | Notes |
|---|---|---|---|---|
| 1 | Lars Benske; Ask Jarl Tjoem | Norway | 6:22.70 | Q |
| 2 | Stanislav Kovalov; Ihor Khmara | Ukraine | 6:25.59 | Q |
| 3 | Lukas Reim; Julian Schöberl | Austria | 6:26.34 | Q |
| 4 | Marlon Colpaert; Niels Van Zandweghe | Belgium | 6:29.60 | Q |
| 5 | Chan Chi Fung; Chiu Hin Chun | Hong Kong | 6:38.65 | R |
| 6 | Anastas Shashkov; Alexandr Afanasyev | Kazakhstan | 6:53.60 | R |

==== Heat 3 ====
| Rank | Rower | Country | Time | Notes |
|---|---|---|---|---|
| 1 | Hugo Beurey; Ferdinand Ludwig | France | 6:24.31 | Q |
| 2 | Rafael Mejía; Ricardo de la Rosa | Mexico | 6:26.19 | Q |
| 3 | Jerzy Kowalski; Artur Mikołajczewski | Poland | 6:28.16 | Q |
| 4 | Ander Koppel; Elar Loot | Estonia | 6:31.72 | Q |
| 5 | Redmond Matthews; Oscar McGuinness | Australia | 6:37.50 | R |
| 6 | Ahmed Abdelaal; Mostafa Kandil | Egypt | 6:42.48 | R |

==== Heat 4 ====
| Rank | Rower | Country | Time | Notes |
|---|---|---|---|---|
| 1 | Jan Schäuble; Raphaël Ahumada | Switzerland | 6:16.70 | Q |
| 2 | Paul Leerkamp; Arno Gaus | Germany | 6:19.53 | Q |
| 3 | Caetano Horta; Manel Balastegui | Spain | 6:20.70 | Q |
| 4 | Sun Man; Chen Weichun | China | 6:25.72 | Q |
| 5 | Matthew Dunham; Christopher Stockley | New Zealand | 6:39.10 | R |
| 6 | Shakhzod Nurmatov; Sobirjon Safaroliev | Uzbekistan | 6:43.83 | R |

==== Heat 5 ====
| Rank | Rower | Country | Time | Notes |
|---|---|---|---|---|
| 1 | Fintan McCarthy; Paul O'Donovan | Ireland | 6:15.11 | Q |
| 2 | Jiří Šimánek; Miroslav Vraštil | Czech Republic | 6:17.01 | Q |
| 3 | Masahiro Takeda; Masayuki Miyaura | Japan | 6:29.21 | Q |
| 4 | Lebone Mokheseng; Murray Bales-Smith | South Africa | 6:32.62 | Q |
| 5 | Bence Tamás; Péter Galambos | Hungary | 6:37.15 | R |

=== Repechages ===
The two fastest boats in repechage advanced to the quarterfinals. The remaining boats were sent to the E final.

==== Repechage 1 ====
| Rank | Rower | Country | Time | Notes |
|---|---|---|---|---|
| 1 | Bence Tamás; Péter Galambos | Hungary | 6:25.48 | Q |
| 2 | Enes Göki; Şefik Çakmaki | Turkey | 6:26.78 | Q |
| 3 | Shakhzod Nurmatov; Sobirjon Safaroliev | Uzbekistan | 6:28.39 | FE |
| 4 | Ahmed Abdelaal; Mostafa Kandil | Egypt | 6:41.99 | FE |
| 5 | Chan Chi Fung; Chiu Hin Chun | Hong Kong | 6:42.90 | FE |

==== Repechage 2 ====
| Rank | Rower | Country | Time | Notes |
|---|---|---|---|---|
| 1 | Matthew Dunham; Christopher Stockley | New Zealand | 6:25.60 | Q |
| 2 | Redmond Matthews; Oscar McGuinness | Australia | 6:27.87 | Q |
| 3 | Anastas Shashkov; Alexandr Afanasyev | Kazakhstan | 6:43.28 | FE |
| 4 | Boucif Mohammed Belhadj; Mohamed Abderraouf Djouimai | Algeria | 6:53.15 | FE |

=== Quarterfinals ===
The three fastest boats in each quarter advanced to the A/B semifinals. The remaining boats were sent to the C/D semifinals.

==== Quarterfinal 1 ====
| Rank | Rower | Country | Time | Notes |
|---|---|---|---|---|
| 1 | Jiří Šimánek; Miroslav Vraštil | Czech Republic | 6:20.32 | SA/B |
| 2 | Stanislav Kovalov; Ihor Khmara | Ukraine | 6:22.48 | SA/B |
| 3 | Pietro Ruta; Stefano Oppo | Italy | 6:22.50 | SA/B |
| 4 | Jerzy Kowalski; Artur Mikołajczewski | Poland | 6:22.54 | SC/D |
| 5 | Sun Man; Chen Weichun | China | 6:23.52 | SC/D |
| 6 | Enes Göki; Şefik Çakmaki | Turkey | 6:45.04 | SC/D |

==== Quarterfinal 2 ====
| Rank | Rower | Country | Time | Notes |
|---|---|---|---|---|
| 1 | Lars Benske; Ask Jarl Tjoem | Norway | 6:20.83 | SA/B |
| 2 | Afonso Costa; Dinis Costa | Portugal | 6:20.89 | SA/B |
| 3 | Paul Leerkamp; Arno Gaus | Germany | 6:22.71 | SA/B |
| 4 | Ander Koppel; Elar Loot | Estonia | 6:24.23 | SC/D |
| 5 | Bence Tamás; Péter Galambos | Hungary | 6:43.10 | SC/D |
| 6 | Lebone Mokheseng; Murray Bales-Smith | South Africa | 6:45.71 | SC/D |

==== Quarterfinal 3 ====
| Rank | Rower | Country | Time | Notes |
|---|---|---|---|---|
| 1 | Fintan McCarthy; Paul O'Donovan | Ireland | 6:21.05 | SA/B |
| 2 | Hugo Beurey; Ferdinand Ludwig | France | 6:23.75 | SA/B |
| 3 | Caetano Horta; Manel Balastegui | Spain | 6:24.81 | SA/B |
| 4 | Jasper Liu; Zachary Heese | United States | 6:25.07 | SC/D |
| 5 | Lukas Reim; Julian Schöberl | Austria | 6:33.40 | SC/D |
| 6 | Redmond Matthews; Oscar McGuinness | Australia | 6:37.40 | SC/D |

==== Quarterfinal 4 ====
| Rank | Rower | Country | Time | Notes |
|---|---|---|---|---|
| 1 | Jan Schäuble; Raphaël Ahumada | Switzerland | 6:25.53 | SA/B |
| 2 | Marlon Colpaert; Niels Van Zandweghe | Belgium | 6:27.42 | SA/B |
| 3 | Matthew Dunham; Christopher Stockley | New Zealand | 6:28.28 | SA/B |
| 4 | Rafael Mejía; Ricardo de la Rosa | Mexico | 6:28.36 | SC/D |
| 5 | Alexander Modest; Rasmus Lind | Denmark | 6:31.88 | SC/D |
| 6 | Masahiro Takeda; Masayuki Miyaura | Japan | 6:47.57 | SC/D |

=== Semifinals C/D ===
The three fastest boats in each semi advanced to the C final. The remaining boats were sent to the D final.

==== Semifinal 1 ====
| Rank | Rower | Country | Time | Notes |
|---|---|---|---|---|
| 1 | Lukas Reim; Julian Schöberl | Austria | 6:36.89 | FC |
| 2 | Redmond Matthews; Oscar McGuinness | Australia | 6:37.25 | FC |
| 3 | Alexander Modest; Rasmus Lind | Denmark | 6:42.73 | FC |
| 4 | Enes Göki; Şefik Çakmaki | Turkey | 6:47.80 | FD |
| 5 | Ander Koppel; Elar Loot | Estonia | 6:48.72 | FD |
| | Jerzy Kowalski; Artur Mikołajczewski | Poland | DNS | |

==== Semifinal 2 ====
| Rank | Rower | Country | Time | Notes |
|---|---|---|---|---|
| 1 | Sun Man; Chen Weichun | China | 6:36.79 | FC |
| 2 | Rafael Mejía; Ricardo de la Rosa | Mexico | 6:37.39 | FC |
| 3 | Jasper Liu; Zachary Heese | United States | 6:37.80 | FC |
| 4 | Masahiro Takeda; Masayuki Miyaura | Japan | 6:40.26 | FD |
| 5 | Bence Tamás; Péter Galambos | Hungary | 6:46.52 | FD |
| 6 | Lebone Mokheseng; Murray Bales-Smith | South Africa | 6:52.12 | FD |

=== Semifinals A/B ===
The three fastest boats in each semi advanced to the A final. The remaining boats were sent to the B final.

==== Semifinal 1 ====
| Rank | Rower | Country | Time | Notes |
|---|---|---|---|---|
| 1 | Jiří Šimánek; Miroslav Vraštil | Czech Republic | 6:26.94 | FA |
| 2 | Pietro Ruta; Stefano Oppo | Italy | 6:28.21 | FA |
| 3 | Hugo Beurey; Ferdinand Ludwig | France | 6:28.81 | FA |
| 4 | Caetano Horta; Manel Balastegui | Spain | 6:33.08 | FB |
| 5 | Marlon Colpaert; Niels Van Zandweghe | Belgium | 6:35.31 | FB |
| 6 | Lars Benske; Ask Jarl Tjoem | Norway | 6:39.03 | FB |

==== Semifinal 2 ====
| Rank | Rower | Country | Time | Notes |
|---|---|---|---|---|
| 1 | Fintan McCarthy; Paul O'Donovan | Ireland | 6:24.41 | FA |
| 2 | Jan Schäuble; Raphaël Ahumada | Switzerland | 6:26.24 | FA |
| 3 | Stanislav Kovalov; Ihor Khmara | Ukraine | 6:30.20 | FA |
| 4 | Afonso Costa; Dinis Costa | Portugal | 6:34.31 | FB |
| 5 | Matthew Dunham; Christopher Stockley | New Zealand | 6:36.31 | FB |
| 6 | Paul Leerkamp; Arno Gaus | Germany | 6:36.48 | FB |

=== Finals ===
The A final determined the rankings for places 1 to 6. Additional rankings were determined in the other finals.

==== Final E ====
| Rank | Rower | Country | Time | Total rank |
|---|---|---|---|---|
| 1 | Shakhzod Nurmatov; Sobirjon Safaroliev | Uzbekistan | 6:43.08 | 24 |
| 2 | Chan Chi Fung; Chiu Hin Chun | Hong Kong | 6:48.84 | 25 |
| 3 | Ahmed Abdelaal; Mostafa Kandil | Egypt | 6:56.29 | 26 |
| 4 | Boucif Mohammed Belhadj; Mohamed Abderraouf Djouimai | Algeria | 6:58.52 | 27 |
| 5 | Anastas Shashkov; Alexandr Afanasyev | Kazakhstan | 7:01.48 | 28 |

==== Final D ====
| Rank | Rower | Country | Time | Total rank |
|---|---|---|---|---|
| 1 | Ander Koppel; Elar Loot | Estonia | 6:36.13 | 19 |
| 2 | Bence Tamás; Péter Galambos | Hungary | 6:39.88 | 20 |
| 3 | Masahiro Takeda; Masayuki Miyaura | Japan | 6:40.26 | 21 |
| 4 | Lebone Mokheseng; Murray Bales-Smith | South Africa | 6:44.94 | 22 |
| 5 | Enes Göki; Şefik Çakmaki | Turkey | 6:59.66 | 23 |

==== Final C ====
| Rank | Rower | Country | Time | Total rank |
|---|---|---|---|---|
| 1 | Jasper Liu; Zachary Heese | United States | 6:27.12 | 13 |
| 2 | Lukas Reim; Julian Schöberl | Austria | 6:27.70 | 14 |
| 3 | Alexander Modest; Rasmus Lind | Denmark | 6:29.28 | 15 |
| 4 | Redmond Matthews; Oscar McGuinness | Australia | 6:31.00 | 16 |
| 5 | Sun Man; Chen Weichun | China | 6:35.18 | 17 |
| 6 | Rafael Mejía; Ricardo de la Rosa | Mexico | BUW | 18 |

==== Final B ====
| Rank | Rower | Country | Time | Total rank |
|---|---|---|---|---|
| 1 | Afonso Costa; Dinis Costa | Portugal | 6:28.78 | 7 |
| 2 | Caetano Horta; Manel Balastegui | Spain | 6:30.02 | 8 |
| 3 | Lars Benske; Ask Jarl Tjoem | Norway | 6:30.50 | 9 |
| 4 | Paul Leerkamp; Arno Gaus | Germany | 6:31.33 | 10 |
| 5 | Matthew Dunham; Christopher Stockley | New Zealand | 6:32.16 | 11 |
| 6 | Marlon Colpaert; Niels Van Zandweghe | Belgium | 6:33.33 | 12 |

==== Final A ====
| Rank | Rower | Country | Time | Notes |
|---|---|---|---|---|
| 1st place, gold medalist(s) | Fintan McCarthy; Paul O'Donovan | Ireland | 6:16.46 | |
| 2nd place, silver medalist(s) | Pietro Ruta; Stefano Oppo | Italy | 6:19.11 | |
| 3rd place, bronze medalist(s) | Stanislav Kovalov; Ihor Khmara | Ukraine | 6:19.53 | |
| 4 | Jan Schäuble; Raphaël Ahumada | Switzerland | 6:21.10 | |
| 5 | Jiří Šimánek; Miroslav Vraštil | Czech Republic | 6:23.24 | |
| 6 | Hugo Beurey; Ferdinand Ludwig | France | 6:28.25 | |
