= Rowing at the 2024 Summer Olympics – Men's lightweight double sculls =

Men's lightweight double sculls at the Games of the XXXIII Olympiad
- Olympic rowing
- Venue: Stade nautique de Vaires-sur-Marne, National Olympic Nautical Stadium of Île-de-France, Vaires-sur-Marne
- Dates: 28 July – 2 August 2024

Medalists
1st place, gold medalist(s)		Fintan McCarthy; Paul O'Donovan	Ireland
2nd place, silver medalist(s)		Stefano Oppo; Gabriel Soares	Italy
3rd place, bronze medalist(s)		Petros Gkaidatzis; Antonios Papakonstantinou	Greece

The men's lightweight double sculls event at the 2024 Summer Olympics took place from 28 July to 2 August 2024 at the Stade nautique de Vaires-sur-Marne, National Olympic Nautical Stadium of Île-de-France in Vaires-sur-Marne. 32 rowers from 16 nations competed. This event is not planned to return at the 2028 Summer Olympics, where it will instead be replaced by coastal rowing, in the form of the beach sprint rowing events.

== Records ==
Prior to this competition, the existing world and Olympic records were as follows:

World Best
World record	Ireland	6:05.33	Tokyo, Japan	2021
Olympic record	Ireland	6:05.33	Tokyo, Japan	2021

== Results ==
=== Heats ===
The first two of each heat qualified for the semifinals, while the remainder went to the repechage.

==== Heat 1 ====
Rank	Lane	Rower	Nation	Time	Notes
1	4	Raphaël Ahumada; Jan Schäuble	Switzerland	6:24.88	Q
2	3	Dennis Carracedo Ferrero; Caetano Horta	Spain	6:28.92	Q
3	1	Hugo Beurey; Ferdinand Ludwig	France	6:31.32	R
4	6	Miguel Ángel Carballo; Alexis López	Mexico	6:37.46	R
5	5	Naoki Furuta; Masayuki Miyaura	Japan	6:52.58	R
6	2	Alejandro Colomino; Pedro Dickson	Argentina	7:04.34	R

==== Heat 2 ====
Rank	Lane	Rower	Nation	Time	Notes
1	5	Stefano Oppo; Gabriel Soares	Italy	6:29.17	Q
2	1	Jiří Šimánek; Miroslav Vraštil Jr.	Czech Republic	6:34.33	Q
3	4	Niels Van Zandweghe; Tibo Vyvey	Belgium	6:45.07	R
4	3	Eber Sanhueza; César Abaroa	Chile	6:46.90	R
5	2	Shakhzod Nurmatov; Sobirjon Safaroliev	Uzbekistan	6:56.57	R

==== Heat 3 ====
Rank	Lane	Rower	Nation	Time	Notes
1	4	Fintan McCarthy; Paul O'Donovan	Ireland	6:34.12	Q
2	3	Lars Benske; Ask Tjøm	Norway	6:41.77	Q
3	2	Petros Gkaidatzis; Antonios Papakonstantinou	Greece	6:46.90	R
4	5	Igor Khmara; Stanislav Kovalov	Ukraine	7:00.13	R
5	1	Ahmed Abdelaal; Mohamed Kota	Egypt	7:20.92	R

=== Repechage ===
The first 3 in each repechage qualify for the Semifinals. The remainder goes to Final C.

==== Repechage 1 ====
Rank	Lane	Rower	Nation	Time	Notes
1	2	Petros Gkaidatzis; Antonios Papakonstantinou	Greece	6:39.46	Q
2	3	Hugo Beurey; Ferdinand Ludwig	France	6:50.98	Q
3	5	Alejandro Colomino; Pedro Dickson	Argentina	6:52.94	Q
4	4	Eber Sanhueza; César Abaroa	Chile	6:58.78	FC
5	1	Ahmed Abdelaal; Mohamed Kota	Egypt	7:14.95	FC

==== Repechage 2 ====
Rank	Lane	Rower	Nation	Time	Notes
1	3	Niels Van Zandweghe; Tibo Vyvey	Belgium	6:42.99	Q
2	4	Igor Khmara; Stanislav Kovalov	Ukraine	6:46.05	Q
3	2	Miguel Ángel Carballo; Alexis López	Mexico	6:47.60	Q
4	5	Shakhzod Nurmatov; Sobirjon Safaroliev	Uzbekistan	6:50.61	FC
5	1	Naoki Furuta; Masayuki Miyaura	Japan	7:04.48	FC

=== Semifinals ===
==== Semifinal A/B 1 ====
Rank	Lane	Rower	Nation	Time	Notes
1	4	Fintan McCarthy; Paul O'Donovan	Ireland	6:21.88	FA
2	3	Raphaël Ahumada; Jan Schäuble	Switzerland	6:24.31	FA
3	5	Jiří Šimánek; Miroslav Vraštil Jr.	Czech Republic	6:25.99	FA
4	6	Hugo Beurey; Ferdinand Ludwig	France	6:26.60	FB
5	2	Niels Van Zandweghe; Tibo Vyvey	Belgium	6:30.49	FB
6	1	Alejandro Colomino; Pedro Dickson	Argentina	6:51.59	FB

==== Semifinal A/B 2 ====
Rank	Lane	Rower	Nation	Time	Notes
1	4	Stefano Oppo; Gabriel Soares	Italy	6:22.85	FA
2	2	Petros Gkaidatzis; Antonios Papakonstantinou	Greece	6:23.36	FA
3	5	Lars Benske; Ask Tjøm	Norway	6:26.62	FA
4	3	Dennis Carracedo Ferrero; Caetano Horta	Spain	6:35.05	FB
5	6	Igor Khmara; Stanislav Kovalov	Ukraine	6:37.35	FB
6	1	Miguel Ángel Carballo; Alexis López	Mexico	6:37.43	FB

=== Finals ===
==== Final C ====
Rank	Lane	Rower	Nation	Time	Notes
13	3	Eber Sanhueza; César Abaroa	Chile	6:28.00	
14	4	Naoki Furuta; Masayuki Miyaura	Japan	6:30.93	
15	2	Shakhzod Nurmatov; Sobirjon Safaroliev	Uzbekistan	6:31.33	
16	1	Ahmed Abdelaal; Mohamed Kota	Egypt	6:37.92	

==== Final B ====
Rank	Lane	Rower	Nation	Time	Notes
7	3	Hugo Beurey; Ferdinand Ludwig	France	6:19.73	
8	4	Dennis Carracedo Ferrero; Caetano Horta	Spain	6:19.90	
9	5	Niels Van Zandweghe; Tibo Vyvey	Belgium	6:20.28	
10	6	Miguel Ángel Carballo; Alexis López	Mexico	6:25.84	
11	2	Igor Khmara; Stanislav Kovalov	Ukraine	6:26.32	
12	1	Alejandro Colomino; Pedro Dickson	Argentina	6:31.86	

==== Final A ====
Rank	Lane	Rower	Nation	Time	Notes
1st place, gold medalist(s)	3	Fintan McCarthy; Paul O'Donovan	Ireland	6:10.99	
2nd place, silver medalist(s)	4	Stefano Oppo; Gabriel Soares	Italy	6:13.33	
3rd place, bronze medalist(s)	2	Petros Gkaidatzis; Antonios Papakonstantinou	Greece	6:13.44	
4	5	Raphaël Ahumada; Jan Schäuble	Switzerland	6:16.50	
5	6	Lars Benske; Ask Tjøm	Norway	6:20.92	
6	1	Jiří Šimánek; Miroslav Vraštil Jr.	Czech Republic	6:21.00	
