= Rowing at the 2013 Summer Universiade – Men's lightweight single sculls =

The men's lightweight single sculls competition at the 2013 Summer Universiade in Kazan took place the Kazan Rowing Centre.

== Results ==
=== Heats ===
==== Heat 1 ====
Rank	Rower	Country	Time	Notes
1	Silvan Zehnder	Switzerland	7:44.10	Q
2	Ruslan Momot	Ukraine	7:50.93	Q
3	Mohd Zulfadli Bin Rozali	Malaysia	7:52.78	Q
4	Joy Punniyalingam	Sri Lanka	9:08.80	R
	Tanveer Arif	Pakistan	DNS	

==== Heat 2 ====
Rank	Rower	Country	Time	Notes
1	Julius Peschel	Germany	7:28.68	Q
2	Richard Vanco	Slovakia	7:34.86	Q
3	Mihkel Pari	Estonia	7:41.56	Q
4	Francois Libois	Belgium	7:49.64	R
5	Lee Hak-beom	South Korea	8:00.72	R

==== Heat 3 ====
Rank	Rower	Country	Time	Notes
1	Jerzy Kowalski	Poland	7:19.12	Q
2	Alexey Nekrasov	Russia	7:26.73	Q
3	Gabor Csepregi	Hungary	7:28.98	Q
4	Redmond Matthews	Australia	7:31.39	R

=== Repechage ===
Rank	Rower	Country	Time	Notes
1	Redmond Matthews	Australia	8:13.38	Q
2	Francois Libois	Belgium	8:22.44	Q
3	Lee Hak-beom	South Korea	8:43.37	Q
4	Joy Punniyalingam	Sri Lanka	10:09.65	FC

=== Semifinals ===
==== Semifinal 1 ====
Rank	Rower	Country	Time	Notes
	Gabor Csepregi	Hungary		
	Richard Vanco	Slovakia		
	Silvan Zehnder	Switzerland		
	Jerzy Kowalski	Poland		
	Mohd Zulfadli Bin Rozali	Malaysia		
	Francois Libois	Belgium		

==== Semifinal 2 ====
Rank	Rower	Country	Time	Notes
	Redmond Matthews	Australia		
	Ruslan Momot	Ukraine		
	Julius Peschel	Germany		
	Alexey Nekrasov	Russia		
	Mihkel Pari	Estonia		
	Lee Hak-beom	South Korea		
