= Greece at the 2024 Summer Olympics =

- IOC code: GRE
- NOC: Hellenic Olympic Committee
- Website: www.hoc.gr (in Greek and English)

in Paris, France 26 July 2024 – 11 August 2024
- Competitors: 100 (59 men and 41 women) in 16 sports
- Flag bearers (opening): Giannis Antetokounmpo & Antigoni Drisbioti
- Flag bearers (closing): Emmanouil Karalis & Evangelia Platanioti
- Medals Ranked 51st: Gold 1 Silver 1 Bronze 6 Total 8

Summer Olympics appearances (overview)
- 1896; 1900; 1904; 1908; 1912; 1920; 1924; 1928; 1932; 1936; 1948; 1952; 1956; 1960; 1964; 1968; 1972; 1976; 1980; 1984; 1988; 1992; 1996; 2000; 2004; 2008; 2012; 2016; 2020; 2024; 2028

Other related appearances
- 1906 Intercalated Games

Greece competed at the 2024 Summer Olympics in Paris, from 26 July to 11 August 2024, with a team of 101 athletes in 17 sports. Greek athletes have appeared in every Summer Olympic Games of the modern era, alongside Australia, France, Great Britain, and Switzerland. As the progenitor nation of the Olympic Games and in keeping with the tradition, Greece entered first at Place du Trocadéro during the parade of nations segment of the opening ceremony.

== Medalists ==
| Medal | Name | Sport | Event | Date |
|---|---|---|---|---|
| Gold | Miltiadis Tentoglou | Athletics | Men's long jump | 6 August |
| Silver | Apostolos Christou | Swimming | Men's 200 m backstroke | 1 August |
| Bronze | Theodoros Tselidis | Judo | Men's –90 kg | 31 July |
| Bronze | Antonios Papakonstantinou; Petros Gkaidatzis | Rowing | Men's lightweight double sculls | 2 August |
| Bronze | Zoi Fitsiou; Milena Kontou | Rowing | Women's lightweight double sculls | 2 August |
| Bronze | Eleftherios Petrounias | Gymnastics | Men's rings | 4 August |
| Bronze | Emmanouil Karalis | Athletics | Men's pole vault | 5 August |
| Bronze | Dauren Kurugliev | Wrestling | Men's freestyle –86 kg | 9 August |

Medals by gender
| Gender | 1st place, gold medalist(s) | 2nd place, silver medalist(s) | 3rd place, bronze medalist(s) | Total |
| Male | 1 | 1 | 5 | 7 |
| Female | 0 | 0 | 1 | 1 |
| Total | 1 | 1 | 6 | 8 |

Medals by sport
| Sport | 1st place, gold medalist(s) | 2nd place, silver medalist(s) | 3rd place, bronze medalist(s) | Total |
| Athletics | 1 | 0 | 1 | 2 |
| Gymnastics | 0 | 0 | 1 | 1 |
| Judo | 0 | 0 | 1 | 1 |
| Rowing | 0 | 0 | 2 | 2 |
| Swimming | 0 | 1 | 0 | 1 |
| Wrestling | 0 | 0 | 1 | 1 |
| Total | 1 | 1 | 6 | 8 |

Medals by date
| Day | Date | 1st place, gold medalist(s) | 2nd place, silver medalist(s) | 3rd place, bronze medalist(s) | Total |
| Day 1 | 27 July | 0 | 0 | 0 | 0 |
| Day 2 | 28 July | 0 | 0 | 0 | 0 |
| Day 3 | 29 July | 0 | 0 | 0 | 0 |
| Day 4 | 30 July | 0 | 0 | 0 | 0 |
| Day 5 | 31 July | 0 | 0 | 1 | 1 |
| Day 6 | 1 August | 0 | 1 | 0 | 1 |
| Day 7 | 2 August | 0 | 0 | 2 | 2 |
| Day 8 | 3 August | 0 | 0 | 0 | 0 |
| Day 9 | 4 August | 0 | 0 | 1 | 1 |
| Day 10 | 5 August | 0 | 0 | 1 | 1 |
| Day 11 | 6 August | 1 | 0 | 0 | 1 |
| Day 12 | 7 August | 0 | 0 | 0 | 0 |
| Day 13 | 8 August | 0 | 0 | 0 | 0 |
| Day 14 | 9 August | 0 | 0 | 1 | 1 |
| Day 15 | 10 August | 0 | 0 | 0 | 0 |
| Day 16 | 11 August | 0 | 0 | 0 | 0 |
| Total | | 1 | 1 | 6 | 8 |

== Competitors ==
The following is the list of number of competitors in the Games.

| Sport | Men | Women | Total |
|---|---|---|---|
| Artistic swimming | —N/a | 2 | 2 |
| Athletics | 4 | 9 | 13 |
| Basketball | 12 | 0 | 12 |
| Cycling | 1 | 0 | 1 |
| Equestrian | 0 | 1 | 1 |
| Fencing | 0 | 1 | 1 |
| Gymnastics | 1 | 0 | 1 |
| Judo | 1 | 1 | 2 |
| Rowing | 3 | 4 | 7 |
| Sailing | 3 | 1 | 4 |
| Shooting | 2 | 3 | 5 |
| Swimming | 14 | 3 | 17 |
| Table tennis | 1 | 0 | 1 |
| Tennis | 2 | 2 | 4 |
| Water polo | 13 | 13 | 26 |
| Wrestling | 2 | 1 | 3 |
| Total | 59 | 41 | 100 |

== Artistic swimming ==
Greece fielded a pair of artistic swimmers to compete in the women's duet as the top three highest-ranked nations, eligible for qualification at the 2024 World Aquatics Championships in Doha, Qatar.

| Athlete | Event | Technical routine | | Free routine (preliminary) | | | Free routine (final) | | |
| Athlete | Event | Points | Rank | Points | Total (technical + free) | Rank | Points | Total (technical + free) | Rank |
|---|---|---|---|---|---|---|---|---|---|
| Sofia Malkogeorgou; Evangelia Platanioti | Duet | 250.4584 | 8 | —N/a | | | 281.8418 | 532.3002 | 6 |

== Athletics ==
Greek track and field athletes achieved the entry standards for Paris 2024, either by passing the direct qualifying mark (or time for track and road races) or by world ranking, in the following events (a maximum of 3 athletes each):

Key

- Note–Ranks given for track events are within the athlete's heat only
- Q = Qualified for the next round
- q = Qualified for the next round as a fastest loser or, in field events, by position without achieving the qualifying target
- R = Qualified for the repechage round
- NR = National record
- SB = Season best
- N/A = Round not applicable for the event
- Bye = Athlete not required to compete in round

Track and road events

| Athlete | Event | Preliminary | | Heat | | Repechage | | Semifinal | | Final | |
| Athlete | Event | Result | Rank | Result | Rank | Result | Rank | Result | Rank | Result | Rank |
|---|---|---|---|---|---|---|---|---|---|---|---|
| Polyniki Emmanouilidou | Women's 100 m | Bye | | 11.25 | 4 | —N/a | | Did not advance | | | |
| Polyniki Emmanouilidou | Women's 200 m | —N/a | | 23.06 | 4 R | 22.99 | 3 q | 23.18 | 8 | Did not advance | |
| Antigoni Drisbioti | Women's 20 km walk | —N/a | | | | | | | | 1:31:33 | 22 |

Field events

| Athlete | Event | Qualification | | Final | |
| Athlete | Event | Distance | Position | Distance | Position |
|---|---|---|---|---|---|
| Emmanouil Karalis | Men's pole vault | 5.75 | =1 q | 5.90 | 3rd place, bronze medalist(s) |
| Miltiadis Tentoglou | Men's long jump | 8.32 | 1 Q | 8.48 | 1st place, gold medalist(s) |
| Michalis Anastasakis | Men's hammer throw | 70.14 | 29 | Did not advance | |
| Christos Frantzeskakis | Men's hammer throw | 75.53 | 11 q | 73.34 | 12 |
| Katerina Stefanidi | Women's pole vault | 4.55 | =9 q | 4.70 | 9 |
| Eleni-Klaoudia Polak | Women's pole vault | DQ | | Did not advance | |
| Ariadni Adamopoulou | Women's pole vault | 4.40 | =12 q | DNS | |
| Tatiana Gusin | Women's high jump | 1.92 | 8 q | 1.86 | 9 |
| Panagiota Dosi | Women's high jump | NM | | Did not advance | |
| Elina Tzengko | Women's javelin throw | 63.22 SB | 5 Q | 61.85 | 9 |
| Stamatia Scarveli | Women's hammer throw | 69.38 | 17 | Did not advance | |

== Basketball ==
=== 5×5 basketball ===
Summary

| Team | Event | Group stage | | | | Quarterfinal | Semifinal | Final / BM | |
| Team | Event | Opposition Score | Opposition Score | Opposition Score | Rank | Opposition Score | Opposition Score | Opposition Score | Rank |
|---|---|---|---|---|---|---|---|---|---|
| Greece men's | Men's tournament | Canada; L 79–86 | Spain; L 77–84 | Australia; W 77–71 | 3 Q | Germany; L 63–76 | Did not advance | | 8 |

==== Men's tournament ====
Greece men's basketball team, qualified by winning a 2024 FIBA Men's Olympic Qualifying Tournament.

Team roster

The roster was announced on 23 July 2024.

Greece men's national basketball team – 2024 Summer Olympics roster
Players
Coaches

| Pos. | No. | Name | Age – Date of birth | Height | Club | Ctr. |
|---|---|---|---|---|---|---|
| PG | 0 | Thomas Walkup | 31 – 30 December 1992 | 1.93 m (6 ft 4 in) | Olympiacos | (Greece) |
| SG | 5 | Giannoulis Larentzakis | 30 – 22 September 1993 | 1.96 m (6 ft 5 in) | Olympiacos | (Greece) |
| G | 6 | Dimitrios Moraitis | 25 – 3 February 1999 | 1.94 m (6 ft 4 in) | Panathinaikos | (Greece) |
| G | 7 | Vassilis Toliopoulos | 28 – 15 June 1996 | 1.88 m (6 ft 2 in) | Aris Thessaloniki | (Greece) |
| PG | 8 | Nick Calathes | 35 – 7 February 1989 | 1.98 m (6 ft 6 in) | AS Monaco | (France) |
| SF | 11 | Panagiotis Kalaitzakis | 25 – 2 January 1999 | 2.00 m (6 ft 7 in) | Panathinaikos | (Greece) |
| C | 14 | Georgios Papagiannis | 27 – 3 July 1997 | 2.17 m (7 ft 1 in) | AS Monaco | (France) |
| F | 15 | Vassilis Charalampopoulos | 27 – 6 January 1997 | 2.03 m (6 ft 8 in) | Türk Telekom | (Turkey) |
| SF | 16 | Kostas Papanikolaou (C) | 33 – 31 July 1990 | 2.03 m (6 ft 8 in) | Olympiacos | (Greece) |
| PF | 33 | Nikos Chougkaz | 23 – 4 October 2000 | 2.07 m (6 ft 9 in) | BC Andorra | (Spain) |
| PF | 34 | Giannis Antetokounmpo | 29 – 6 December 1994 | 2.11 m (6 ft 11 in) | Milwaukee Bucks | (United States) |
| F/C | 44 | Dinos Mitoglou | 28 – 11 June 1996 | 2.10 m (6 ft 11 in) | Panathinaikos | (Greece) |

Head coach

- (Greece) Vassilis Spanoulis

Assistant coach(es)

- (Greece) Kostas Charalampidis
- (Greece) Ilias Kantzouris
- (Greece) Diamantis Panagiotopoulos
- (Greece) Stefanos Trantafillos

Legend

- (C) Team captain
- Club – describes last club
  before the tournament
- Age – describes age
  on 27 July 2024

Group play

| Pos | Team | Pld | W | L | PF | PA | PD | Pts | Qualification |
|---|---|---|---|---|---|---|---|---|---|
| 1 | Canada | 3 | 3 | 0 | 267 | 247 | +20 | 6 | Quarterfinals |
| 2 | Australia | 3 | 1 | 2 | 246 | 250 | −4 | 4 (Note: Australia 3 Pts, +6 PD; Greece 3 Pts, −1 PD; Spain 3 Pts, −5 PD.) | Quarterfinals |
| 3 | Greece | 3 | 1 | 2 | 233 | 241 | −8 | 4 | Quarterfinals |
| 4 | Spain | 3 | 1 | 2 | 249 | 257 | −8 | 4 | |

Source: FIBA
Rules for classification: 1) classification points; 2) head-to-head results; 3) head-to-head game points difference; 4) head-to-head number of game points scored.
Notes:

27 July 2024
21:00

Boxscore

| Greece | 79–86 | Canada |
Scoring by quarter: 22–26, 16–22, 22–20, 19–18
| Pts: Antetokounmpo 34; Rebs: Mitoglou 8 Asts: Calathes 7 | | Pts: Barrett 23; Rebs: Olynyk 6 Asts: Gilgeous-Alexander 7 |

Stade Pierre-Mauroy, Lille
Attendance: 26,421
Referees: Roberto Vázquez (PUR), Johnny Batista (PUR), Wojciech Liszka (POL)

30 July 2024
11:00

Boxscore

| Spain | 84–77 | Greece |
Scoring by quarter: 21–22, 28–13, 13–21, 22–21
| Pts: Aldama 19; Rebs: Aldama 12; Asts: Brown 10 | | Pts: Antetokounmpo 27; Rebs: Antetokounmpo 11; Asts: Calathes 7 |

Stade Pierre-Mauroy, Lille
Attendance: 26,980
Referees: Ademir Zurapović (BIH), Mārtiņš Kozlovskis (LAT), Julio Anaya (PAN)

2 August 2024
13:30

Boxscore

| Australia | 71–77 | Greece |
Scoring by quarter: 24–25, 12–28, 14–9, 21–15
| Pts: Landale 17; Rebs: Giddey 11; Asts: Daniels 8 | | Pts: Antetokounmpo 20; Rebs: three players 7 Asts: Calathes 8 |

Stade Pierre-Mauroy, Lille
Attendance: 26,850
Referees: Roberto Vázquez (PUR), Mārtiņš Kozlovskis (LAT), Johnny Batista (PUR)

Quarterfinal

6 August 2024
11:00

Boxscore

| Germany | 76–63 | Greece |
Scoring by quarter: 11–21, 25–15, 23–16, 17–11
| Pts: F. Wagner 18; Rebs: Theis 8 Asts: Schröder 8 | | Pts: Antetokounmpo 22; Rebs: Papanikolaou 9 Asts: Antetokounmpo 3 |

Accor Arena, Paris
Attendance: 12,288
Referees: Roberto Vázquez (PUR), Mārtiņš Kozlovskis (LAT), Johnny Batista (PUR)

== Cycling ==
=== Road ===
Greece qualified one rider to compete in the men's Olympic road race, by virtue of a finish in the top 50 national finish (for men) in the UCI World Ranking

| Athlete | Event | Time | Rank |
|---|---|---|---|
| Georgios Bouglas | Men's road race | 6:45:33 | 75 |

== Equestrian ==
Greece entered one riders in the individual jumping event, through the establishments of final olympics ranking for Group C (Central & Eastern Europe; Central Asia).

=== Jumping ===
| Athlete | Horse | Event | Qualification | | | Final | | |
| Athlete | Horse | Event | Penalties | Time | Rank | Penalties | Time | Rank |
|---|---|---|---|---|---|---|---|---|
| Ioli Mytilineou | L'Artiste de Toxandra | Individual | 12 | 74.32 | 57 | Did not advance | | |

== Fencing ==
Greece entered one fencer into the Olympic competition. Theodora Gkountoura secured her quota places in women's sabre events, after nominated as one of two highest ranked individual fencers, eligible for European zone through the release of the FIE Official ranking for Paris 2024.

| Athlete | Event | Round of 64 | Round of 32 | Round of 16 | Quarterfinal | Semifinal | Final / BM | |
| Athlete | Event | Opposition Score | Opposition Score | Opposition Score | Opposition Score | Opposition Score | Opposition Score | Rank |
|---|---|---|---|---|---|---|---|---|
| Theodora Gkountoura | Women's sabre | Bye | Brind'Amour (CAN); W 15–3 | Berder (FRA); W 15–7 | Brunet (FRA); L 13–15 | Did not advance | | 5 |

== Gymnastics ==
=== Artistic ===
On 7 October 2023, Eleftherios Petrounias secured a position in men's rings at the 2024 Summer Olympics, by winning a silver medal with 15.233 points at the 2023 World Artistic Gymnastics Championships in Antwerp.

Men

| Athlete | Event | Qualification | | | | | | | | Final | | | | | | | |
| Athlete | Event | Apparatus | | | | | | Total | Rank | Apparatus | | | | | | Total | Rank |
| Athlete | Event | F | PH | R | V | PB | HB | Total | Rank | F | PH | R | V | PB | HB | Total | Rank |
|---|---|---|---|---|---|---|---|---|---|---|---|---|---|---|---|---|---|
| Eleftherios Petrounias | Rings | —N/a | | 14.800 | —N/a | | | 14.800 | 6 Q | —N/a | | 15.100 | —N/a | | | 15.100 | 3rd place, bronze medalist(s) |

== Judo ==
Theodoros Tselidis and Elisavet Teltsidou secured a position in their respective category by virtue of their world ranking.

| Athlete | Event | Round of 32 | Round of 16 | Quarterfinals | Semifinals | Repechage | Final / BM | |
| Athlete | Event | Opposition Result | Opposition Result | Opposition Result | Opposition Result | Opposition Result | Opposition Result | Rank |
|---|---|---|---|---|---|---|---|---|
| Theodoros Tselidis | Men's −90 kg | Florentino (DOM); W 10–00 | Majdov (SRB); W 10–00 | Ngayap Hambou (FRA); L 00–01 GS | Did not advance | Grigorian (UAE); W 10–00 GS | Mosakhlishvili (ESP); W 01–00 | 3rd place, bronze medalist(s) |
| Elisavet Teltsidou | Women's −70 kg | Bye | Willems (BEL); L 00–10 | Did not advance | | | | 9 |

== Rowing ==
Greek rowers qualified boats in the following classes through the 2023 World Rowing Championships in Belgrade, Serbia and through the 2024 Final Qualification Regatta in Lucerne, Switzerland.

| Athlete | Event | Heats | | Repechage | | Quarterfinals | | Semifinals | | Final | |
| Athlete | Event | Time | Rank | Time | Rank | Time | Rank | Time | Rank | Time | Rank |
|---|---|---|---|---|---|---|---|---|---|---|---|
| Stefanos Ntouskos | Men's single sculls | 7:01.79 | 2 QF | Bye | | 6:56.68 | 3 SA/B | 6:40.78 | 3 FA | 7:02.05 | 6 |
| Antonios Papakonstantinou; Petros Gkaidatzis | Men's lightweight double sculls | 6:46.90 | 3 R | 6:39.46 | 1 SA/B | —N/a | | 6:23.36 | 2 FA | 6:13.44 | 3rd place, bronze medalist(s) |
| Evangelia Anastasiadou; Christina Bourmpou | Women's pair | 7:20.49 | 2 SA/B | Bye | | —N/a | | 7:18.28 | 3 FA | 7:13.30 | 6 |
| Milena Kontou; Zoi Fitsiou | Women's lightweight double sculls | 7:08.51 | 2 SA/B | Bye | | —N/a | | 6:57.90 | 2 FA | 6:49.28 | 3rd place, bronze medalist(s) |

Qualification Legend: FA=Final A (medal); FB=Final B (non-medal); FC=Final C (non-medal); FD=Final D (non-medal); FE=Final E (non-medal); FF=Final F (non-medal); SA/B=Semifinals A/B; SC/D=Semifinals C/D; SE/F=Semifinals E/F; QF=Quarterfinals; R=Repechage

== Sailing ==
Greek sailors qualified three boats to compete at Paris 2024. All of the boats qualified through the 2024 Semaine Olympique Française (Last Chance Regatta) in Hyères, France.

Elimination events

| Athlete | Event | Race | | | | | | | | | | | | | Net points | Rank | Race | | | | | | | | | | | | | Final rank |
| Athlete | Event | 1 | 2 | 3 | 4 | 5 | 6 | 7 | 8 | 9 | 10 | 11 | 12 | 13 | Net points | Rank | QF | SF1 | SF2 | SF3 | SF4 | SF5 | SF6 | F1 | F2 | F3 | F4 | F5 | F6 | Final rank |
|---|---|---|---|---|---|---|---|---|---|---|---|---|---|---|---|---|---|---|---|---|---|---|---|---|---|---|---|---|---|---|
| Byron Kokkalanis | Men's IQFoil | 18 | 8 | 15 | ~~BFD~~ | 4 | 19 | ~~BFD~~ | 19 | BFD | 17 | 10 | 22 | 21 | 178 | 22 EL | Did not advance | | | | | | | | | | | | | 22 |
| Cameron Maramenides | Men's Formula Kite | 9 | 10 | 6 | ~~12~~ | 8 | 7 | ~~14~~ | —N/a | | | | | | 39 | 11 EL | —N/a | Did not advance | | | | | | | | | | | | 11 |

Medal race events

| Athlete | Event | Race | | | | | | | | | Net points | Final rank |
| Athlete | Event | 1 | 2 | 3 | 4 | 5 | 6 | 7 | 8 | M | Net points | Final rank |
|---|---|---|---|---|---|---|---|---|---|---|---|---|
| Ariadni Spanaki; Odysseas Spanakis | Mixed 470 | 13 | 11 | 6 | ~~17~~ | 13 | 11 | 4 | 10 | EL | 68 | 12 |

M = Medal race, EL = Eliminated – did not advance into the medal race/quarterfinals/semifinals/final, DNF= Did not finish the race, BFD = Black Flag Disqualification – False start, DSQ = Disqualification, UFD = "U" Flag Disqualification

== Shooting ==
Greek shooters achieved quota places for the following events based on their results at the 2022 and 2023 ISSF World Championships, 2022, 2023, and 2024 European Championships, 2023 European Games, and 2024 ISSF World Olympic Qualification Tournament.

| Athlete | Event | Qualification | | Final | |
| Athlete | Event | Points | Rank | Points | Rank |
|---|---|---|---|---|---|
| Efthimios Mitas | Men's skeet | 121 | 11 | Did not advance | |
| Charalampos Chalkadiakis | Men's skeet | 118 | 19 | Did not advance | |
| Anna Korakaki | Women's 10 m air pistol | DNF | | Did not advance | |
| Anna Korakaki | Women's 25 m pistol | 570 | 34 | Did not advance | |
| Christina Moschi | Women's 10 m air pistol | 569 | 29 | Did not advance | |
| Emmanouela Katzouraki | Women's skeet | 122 | 3 Q | 23 | 5 |
| Emmanouela Katzouraki; Efthimios Mitas | Mixed team skeet | 139 | =13 | Did not advance | |

== Swimming ==
Greek swimmers achieved the entry standards in the following events for Paris 2024 (a maximum of two swimmers under the Olympic Qualifying Time (OQT) and potentially at the Olympic Consideration Time (OCT)):

| Athlete | Event | Heat | | Semifinal | | Final | |
| Athlete | Event | Time | Rank | Time | Rank | Time | Rank |
|---|---|---|---|---|---|---|---|
| Kristian Gkolomeev | Men's 50 m freestyle | 21.86 | =8 Q | 21.62 | 7 Q | 21.59 | 5 |
| Stergios-Marios Bilas | Men's 50 m freestyle | 22.00 | 18 | Did not advance | | | |
| Apostolos Christou | Men's 100 m backstroke | 52.95 | 3 Q | 52.77 | 6 Q | 52.41 | 4 |
| Apostolos Christou | Men's 200 m backstroke | 1:57.18 | 7 Q | 1:56.33 | =4 Q | 1:54.82 NR | 2nd place, silver medalist(s) |
| Evangelos Makrygiannis | Men's 100 m backstroke | 53.24 | 8 Q | 52.97 | 9 | Did not advance | |
| Apostolos Siskos | Men's 200 m backstroke | 1:57.26 | 9 Q | 1:57.77 | 14 | Did not advance | |
| Dimitrios Markos | Men's 800 m freestyle | 8:01.37 | 26 | —N/a | | Did not advance | |
| Dimitrios Markos | Men's 1500 m freestyle | 15:11.19 | 19 | —N/a | | Did not advance | |
| Apostolos Papastamos | Men's 200 m individual medley | 2:00.79 | 16 Q | 2:01.02 | 16 | Did not advance | |
| Apostolos Papastamos | Men's 400 m individual medley | 4:15.32 | 15 | —N/a | | Did not advance | |
| Odysseas Meladinis; Stergios-Marios Bilas; Panagiotis Bolanos; Andreas Vazaios | Men's 4 × 100 m freestyle relay | 3:17.47 | 16 | —N/a | | Did not advance | |
| Andreas Vazaios; Dimitrios Markos; Konstantinos Englezakis; Konstantinos Stamou | Men's 4 × 200 m freestyle relay | 7:09.60 | 11 | —N/a | | Did not advance | |
| Athanasios Kynigakis | Men's 10 km open water | —N/a | | | | 1:52:37.2 | 10 |
| Anna Ntountounaki | Women's 100 m butterfly | 58.14 | 19 | Did not advance | | | |
| Theodora Drakou | Women's 50 m freestyle | 24.80 | 17 | Did not advance | | | |
| Georgia Damasioti | Women's 100 m butterfly | 58.72 | 23 | Did not advance | | | |
| Georgia Damasioti | Women's 200 m butterfly | 2:09.55 | 13 Q | 2:10.25 | 15 | Did not advance | |
| Anna Ntountounaki; Theodora Drakou; Apostolos Christou; Evangelos-Efraim Ntoumas | Mixed 4 × 100 m medley relay | 3:46.40 | 13 | —N/a | | Did not advance | |

== Table tennis ==
Greece entered one athlete into the games. Panagiotis Gionis secured his spot at the Games via winning the second available places for men's singles event, through the 2024 European Qualification Tournament in Sarajevo, Bosnia and Herzegovina.

| Athlete | Event | Preliminary | Round of 64 | Round of 32 | Round of 16 | Quarterfinals | Semifinals | Final / BM | |
| Athlete | Event | Opposition Result | Opposition Result | Opposition Result | Opposition Result | Opposition Result | Opposition Result | Opposition Result | Rank |
|---|---|---|---|---|---|---|---|---|---|
| Panagiotis Gionis | Men's singles | Bye | Ly (CAN); W 4–0 | Jha (USA); L 2–4 | Did not advance | | | | 17 |

== Tennis ==
Stefanos Tsitsipas and Maria Sakkari secured a position in the Men's and Women's singles respectively by virtue of their world rankings on 10 June 2024. In addition, their combined ranking made them available to play together in the Mixed doubles tournament. Also, Petros Tsitsipas and Despina Papamichail qualified for their respective doubles event via combined ranking of them with that of Stefanos' and Maria's respectively. During the games, Petros was announced that he will play in the Men's singles due to withdrawal of Cameron Norrie.

| Athlete | Event | Round of 64 | Round of 32 | Round of 16 | Quarterfinals | Semifinals | Final / BM | |
| Athlete | Event | Opposition Score | Opposition Score | Opposition Score | Opposition Score | Opposition Score | Opposition Score | Rank |
|---|---|---|---|---|---|---|---|---|
| Petros Tsitsipas | Men's singles | Griekspoor (NED); L 2–6, 3–6 | Did not advance | | | | | |
| Stefanos Tsitsipas | Men's singles | Bergs (BEL); W 7–6^{(8–6)}, 1–6, 6–1 | Evans (GBR); W 6–1, 6–2 | Báez (ARG); W 7–5, 6–1 | Djokovic (SRB); L 3–6, 6–7^{(3–7)} | Did not advance | | |
| Petros Tsitsipas; Stefanos Tsitsipas | Men's doubles | —N/a | Borges / Cabral (POR); L 6–3, 3–6, [10–12] | Did not advance | | | | |
| Maria Sakkari | Women's singles | Kovinić (MNE); W 6–0, 6–1 | Yuan (CHN); W 6–2, 6–1 | Kostyuk (UKR); L 6–4, 6–7^{(5–7)}, 4–6 | Did not advance | | | |
| Despina Papamichail; Maria Sakkari | Women's doubles | —N/a | Collins / Krawczyk (USA); L 1–6, 3–6 | Did not advance | | | | |
| Maria Sakkari; Stefanos Tsitsipas | Mixed doubles | —N/a | | Schuurs / Koolhof (NED); L 4–6, 6–7^{(3–7)} | Did not advance | | | |

== Water polo ==
Summary

Key:
- FT – After full time.
- P – Match decided by penalty-shootout.

| Team | Event | Group stage | | | | | | Quarterfinal | Semifinal | Final / BM | |
| Team | Event | Opposition Score | Opposition Score | Opposition Score | Opposition Score | Opposition Score | Rank | Opposition Score | Opposition Score | Opposition Score | Rank |
|---|---|---|---|---|---|---|---|---|---|---|---|
| Greece men's | Men's tournament | Romania; W 14–7 | Montenegro; W 17–16 | United States; W 13–11 | Croatia; L 13–14 | Italy; W 9–8 | 1 Q | Serbia; L 11–12 | Did not advance | | 5 |
| Greece women's | Women's tournament | United States; L 6–15 | Spain; L 8–10 | Italy; L 8–12 | France; W 11–4 | —N/a | 4 Q | Australia; L 6–9 | Did not advance | | 7 |

=== Men's tournament ===
Greece men's national water polo team qualified for the Olympics by advancing to the final match and securing an outright berth at the 2023 World Aquatics Championships in Fukuoka, Japan.

Team roster

The roster was announced on 6 July 2024.

Head coach: Thodoris Vlachos

- 1 Emmanouil Zerdevas GK
- 2 Konstantinos Genidounias D
- 3 Dimitrios Skoumpakis CB
- 4 Efstathios Kalogeropoulos D
- 5 Ioannis Fountoulis (c) D
- 6 Alexandros Papanastasiou D
- 7 Nikos Gillas D
- 8 Stylianos Argyropoulos CB
- 9 Nikolaos Papanikolaou CF
- 10 Konstantinos Kakaris CF
- 11 Dimitris Nikolaidis CF
- 12 Angelos Vlachopoulos D
- 13 Panagiotis Tzortzatos GK

Group play

| Pos | Team | Pld | W | PSW | PSL | L | GF | GA | GD | Pts | Qualification |
|---|---|---|---|---|---|---|---|---|---|---|---|
| 1 | Greece | 5 | 3 | 1 | 0 | 1 | 61 | 52 | +9 | 11 (Note: Greece 9–8 Italy) | Quarterfinals |
| 2 | Italy | 5 | 3 | 1 | 0 | 1 | 60 | 43 | +17 | 11 | Quarterfinals |
| 3 | United States | 5 | 3 | 0 | 0 | 2 | 59 | 51 | +8 | 9 (Note: Croatia 11–14 United States) | Quarterfinals |
| 4 | Croatia | 5 | 3 | 0 | 0 | 2 | 58 | 57 | +1 | 9 | Quarterfinals |
| 5 | Montenegro | 5 | 1 | 0 | 2 | 2 | 45 | 50 | −5 | 5 | |
| 6 | Romania | 5 | 0 | 0 | 0 | 5 | 37 | 67 | −30 | 0 | |

Source: Olympics
Rules for classification: 1) Points; 2) Head-to-head points; 3) Head-to-head goal difference; 4) Head-to-head goals scored; 5) Goal difference.
Notes:

| 28 July 2024; 21:05 v | Report | Romania | 7–14 | Greece | Paris Aquatic Centre, Paris; Referees: Michiel Zwart (NED), Zhang Liang (CHN) |
| 28 July 2024; 21:05 v | Report | Score by quarters: 2–4, 3–5, 1–2, 1–3 | | | Paris Aquatic Centre, Paris; Referees: Michiel Zwart (NED), Zhang Liang (CHN) |
| 28 July 2024; 21:05 v | Report | Georgescu, Neamțu 2 | Goals | Argyropoulos 4 | Paris Aquatic Centre, Paris; Referees: Michiel Zwart (NED), Zhang Liang (CHN) |

| 30 July 2024; 19:30 v | Report | Montenegro | 16–17 (PSO) | Greece | Paris Aquatic Centre, Paris; Referees: Frank Ohme (GER), Tamás Kovács (HUN) |
| 30 July 2024; 19:30 v | Report | Score by quarters: 4–2, 3–3, 2–3, 3–4 PSO: 4–5 | | | Paris Aquatic Centre, Paris; Referees: Frank Ohme (GER), Tamás Kovács (HUN) |
| 30 July 2024; 19:30 v | Report | Popadić 4 | Goals | Vlachopoulos 3 | Paris Aquatic Centre, Paris; Referees: Frank Ohme (GER), Tamás Kovács (HUN) |

| 1 August 2024; 10:30 v | Report | Greece | 13–11 | United States | Paris Aquatic Centre, Paris; Referees: David Gómez (ESP), Sébastien Dervieux (FRA) |
| 1 August 2024; 10:30 v | Report | Score by quarters: 4–4, 3–2, 4–3, 2–2 | | | Paris Aquatic Centre, Paris; Referees: David Gómez (ESP), Sébastien Dervieux (FRA) |
| 1 August 2024; 10:30 v | Report | Argyropoulos 4 | Goals | Bowen, Irving 2 | Paris Aquatic Centre, Paris; Referees: David Gómez (ESP), Sébastien Dervieux (FRA) |

| 3 August 2024; 12:05 v | Report | Croatia | 14–13 | Greece | Paris Aquatic Centre, Paris; Referees: Vojin Putniković (SRB), David Gómez (ESP) |
| 3 August 2024; 12:05 v | Report | Score by quarters: 3–3, 1–3, 7–3, 3–4 | | | Paris Aquatic Centre, Paris; Referees: Vojin Putniković (SRB), David Gómez (ESP) |
| 3 August 2024; 12:05 v | Report | Kharkov 4 | Goals | five players 2 | Paris Aquatic Centre, Paris; Referees: Vojin Putniković (SRB), David Gómez (ESP) |

| 5 August 2024; 15:10 v | Report | Greece | 9–8 | Italy | Paris La Défense Arena, Paris; Referees: Michiel Zwart (NED), Zhang Liang (CHN) |
| 5 August 2024; 15:10 v | Report | Score by quarters: 2–2, 4–3, 0–1, 3–2 | | | Paris La Défense Arena, Paris; Referees: Michiel Zwart (NED), Zhang Liang (CHN) |
| 5 August 2024; 15:10 v | Report | Argyropoulos 4 | Goals | Bruni, Condemi 3 | Paris La Défense Arena, Paris; Referees: Michiel Zwart (NED), Zhang Liang (CHN) |

Quarterfinal

| 7 August 2024; 15:35 v | Report | Greece | 11–12 | Serbia | Paris La Défense Arena, Paris; Referees: Frank Ohme (GER), Andrej Franulović (CRO) |
| 7 August 2024; 15:35 v | Report | Score by quarters: 3–3, 2–3, 4–2, 2–4 | | | Paris La Défense Arena, Paris; Referees: Frank Ohme (GER), Andrej Franulović (CRO) |
| 7 August 2024; 15:35 v | Report | Skoumpakis 3 | Goals | Mandić 5 | Paris La Défense Arena, Paris; Referees: Frank Ohme (GER), Andrej Franulović (CRO) |

5th–8th place semifinal

| 9 August 2024; 18:00 v | Report | Greece | 15–9 | Australia | Paris La Défense Arena, Paris; Referees: Tamás Kovács (HUN), Andrej Franulović (CRO) |
| 9 August 2024; 18:00 v | Report | Score by quarters: 3–1, 2–2, 5–3, 5–3 | | | Paris La Défense Arena, Paris; Referees: Tamás Kovács (HUN), Andrej Franulović (CRO) |
| 9 August 2024; 18:00 v | Report | Kakaris 4 | Goals | three players 2 | Paris La Défense Arena, Paris; Referees: Tamás Kovács (HUN), Andrej Franulović (CRO) |

Fifth place game

| 11 August 2024; 09:00 v | Report | Greece | 15–13 | Spain | Paris La Défense Arena, Paris; Referees: Frank Ohme (GER), Rafaele Colombo (ITA) |
| 11 August 2024; 09:00 v | Report | Score by quarters: 2–2, 6–4, 4–1, 3–6 | | | Paris La Défense Arena, Paris; Referees: Frank Ohme (GER), Rafaele Colombo (ITA) |
| 11 August 2024; 09:00 v | Report | three players 3 | Goals | Sanahuja 3 | Paris La Défense Arena, Paris; Referees: Frank Ohme (GER), Rafaele Colombo (ITA) |

=== Women's tournament ===
Greece women's national water polo team qualified for the Olympics by placing third at the 2024 Women's European Water Polo Championship.

Team roster

The roster was announced on 4 July 2024.

Head coach: Alexia Kammenou

- 1 Chrysi Diamantopoulou GK
- 2 Eleftheria Plevritou D
- 3 Ioanna Chydirioti W
- 4 Nikoleta Eleftheriadou W
- 5 Margarita Plevritou (c) CB
- 6 Eleni Xenaki CF
- 7 Alexandra Asimaki CF
- 8 Maria Patra CB
- 9 Eirini Ninou D
- 10 Vasiliki Plevritou D
- 11 Athina Giannopoulou D
- 12 Maria Myriokefalitaki CF
- 13 Ioanna Stamatopoulou GK

Group play

| Pos | Team | Pld | W | PSW | PSL | L | GF | GA | GD | Pts | Qualification |
|---|---|---|---|---|---|---|---|---|---|---|---|
| 1 | Spain | 4 | 4 | 0 | 0 | 0 | 51 | 36 | +15 | 12 | Quarterfinals |
| 2 | United States | 4 | 3 | 0 | 0 | 1 | 53 | 27 | +26 | 9 | Quarterfinals |
| 3 | Italy | 4 | 1 | 0 | 0 | 3 | 34 | 40 | −6 | 3 (Note: Greece 3 Pts, +3 GD; Italy 3 Pts, +3 GD; France 3 Pts, −6 GD. Italy ranked above Greece due to more goals scored.) | Quarterfinals |
| 4 | Greece | 4 | 1 | 0 | 0 | 3 | 33 | 41 | −8 | 3 | Quarterfinals |
| 5 | France (H) | 4 | 1 | 0 | 0 | 3 | 24 | 51 | −27 | 3 | |

Source: Olympics
Rules for classification: 1) Points; 2) Head-to-head points; 3) Head-to-head goal difference; 4) Head-to-head goals scored; 5) Goal difference.
(H) Host
Notes:

| 27 July 2024; 15:35 v | Report | Greece | 6–15 | United States | Paris Aquatic Centre, Paris; Referees: Nóra Debreceni (HUN), Frank Ohme (GER) |
| 27 July 2024; 15:35 v | Report | Score by quarters: 0–3, 2–6, 2–3, 2–3 | | | Paris Aquatic Centre, Paris; Referees: Nóra Debreceni (HUN), Frank Ohme (GER) |
| 27 July 2024; 15:35 v | Report | six players 1 | Goals | Flynn 4 | Paris Aquatic Centre, Paris; Referees: Nóra Debreceni (HUN), Frank Ohme (GER) |

| 31 July 2024; 20:05 v | Report | Spain | 10–8 | Greece | Paris Aquatic Centre, Paris; Referees: Adrian Alexandrescu (ROU), Veselin Mišković (MNE) |
| 31 July 2024; 20:05 v | Report | Score by quarters: 2–2, 3–3, 4–2, 1–1 | | | Paris Aquatic Centre, Paris; Referees: Adrian Alexandrescu (ROU), Veselin Mišković (MNE) |
| 31 July 2024; 20:05 v | Report | Forca 4 | Goals | Eleftheriadou, Plevritou 2 | Paris Aquatic Centre, Paris; Referees: Adrian Alexandrescu (ROU), Veselin Mišković (MNE) |

| 2 August 2024; 15:35 v | Report | Greece | 8–12 | Italy | Paris Aquatic Centre, Paris; Referees: Andrej Franulović (CRO), Nóra Debreceni (HUN) |
| 2 August 2024; 15:35 v | Report | Score by quarters: 3–4, 0–2, 2–2, 3–4 | | | Paris Aquatic Centre, Paris; Referees: Andrej Franulović (CRO), Nóra Debreceni (HUN) |
| 2 August 2024; 15:35 v | Report | Eleftheriadou, Plevritou 3 | Goals | Palmieri 4 | Paris Aquatic Centre, Paris; Referees: Andrej Franulović (CRO), Nóra Debreceni (HUN) |

| 4 August 2024; 20:05 v | Report | France | 4–11 | Greece | Paris Aquatic Centre, Paris; Referees: Vojin Putniković (SRB), Veselin Mišković (MNE) |
| 4 August 2024; 20:05 v | Report | Score by quarters: 1–2, 2–1, 1–3, 0–5 | | | Paris Aquatic Centre, Paris; Referees: Vojin Putniković (SRB), Veselin Mišković (MNE) |
| 4 August 2024; 20:05 v | Report | Vernoux 2 | Goals | Plevritou, Xenaki 3 | Paris Aquatic Centre, Paris; Referees: Vojin Putniković (SRB), Veselin Mišković (MNE) |

Quarterfinal

| 6 August 2024; 19:00 v | Report | Australia | 9–6 | Greece | Paris La Défense Arena, Paris; Referees: Alessia Ferrari (ITA), Sébastien Dervieux (FRA) |
| 6 August 2024; 19:00 v | Report | Score by quarters: 1–0, 3–3, 2–1, 3–2 | | | Paris La Défense Arena, Paris; Referees: Alessia Ferrari (ITA), Sébastien Dervieux (FRA) |
| 6 August 2024; 19:00 v | Report | Williams 5 | Goals | Xenaki 2 | Paris La Défense Arena, Paris; Referees: Alessia Ferrari (ITA), Sébastien Dervieux (FRA) |

5th–8th place semifinal

| 8 August 2024; 18:00 v | Report | Greece | 9–12 | Hungary | Paris La Défense Arena, Paris; Referees: Marta Cabañas (ESP), Michiel Zwart (NED) |
| 8 August 2024; 18:00 v | Report | Score by quarters: 2–1, 2–3, 3–4, 2–4 | | | Paris La Défense Arena, Paris; Referees: Marta Cabañas (ESP), Michiel Zwart (NED) |
| 8 August 2024; 18:00 v | Report | three players 2 | Goals | Keszthelyi 4 | Paris La Défense Arena, Paris; Referees: Marta Cabañas (ESP), Michiel Zwart (NED) |

Seventh place game

| 10 August 2024; 09:00 v | Report | Greece | 19–10 | Canada | Paris La Défense Arena, Paris; Referees: Aurélie Blanchard (FRA), Jennifer McCall (USA) |
| 10 August 2024; 09:00 v | Report | Score by quarters: 2–2, 5–3, 5–2, 7–3 | | | Paris La Défense Arena, Paris; Referees: Aurélie Blanchard (FRA), Jennifer McCall (USA) |
| 10 August 2024; 09:00 v | Report | three players 3 | Goals | Crevier 3 | Paris La Défense Arena, Paris; Referees: Aurélie Blanchard (FRA), Jennifer McCall (USA) |

== Wrestling ==
Greece qualified three wrestlers for each of the following classes into the Olympic competition. Georgios Kougioumtsidis qualified for the games by virtue of top five results through the 2023 World Championships in Belgrade, Serbia; meanwhile Dauren Kurugliev qualified for the games through the 2024 World Qualification Tournament in Istanbul, Turkey. Maria Prevolaraki earned a spot in the Olympics due to reallocation with the Individual Neutral Athletes (AIN).

Key:

- VT (ranking points: 5–0 or 0–5) – Victory by fall.
- VB (ranking points: 5–0 or 0–5) – Victory by injury (VF for forfeit, VA for withdrawal or disqualification)
- PP (ranking points: 3–1 or 1–3) – Decision by points – the loser with technical points.
- PO (ranking points: 3–0 or 0–3) – Decision by points – the loser without technical points.
- ST (ranking points: 4–0 or 0–4) – Great superiority – the loser without technical points and a margin of victory of at least 8 (Greco-Roman) or 10 (freestyle) points.
- SP (ranking points: 4–1 or 1–4) – Technical superiority – the loser with technical points and a margin of victory of at least 8 (Greco-Roman) or 10 (freestyle) points.

Freestyle

| Athlete | Event | Round of 16 | Quarterfinal | Semifinal | Repechage | Final / BM | |
| Athlete | Event | Opposition Result | Opposition Result | Opposition Result | Opposition Result | Opposition Result | Rank |
|---|---|---|---|---|---|---|---|
| Georgios Kougioumtsidis | Men's −74 kg | Rassadin (TJK); L 1–3 ^{PP} | Did not advance | | | | |
| Dauren Kurugliev | Men's −86 kg | Ramos (PUR); W 4–0 ^{ST} | Yazdani (IRI); L 1–3 ^{PP} | Did not advance | Lawrence (AUS); W 4–0 ^{ST} | Amine (SMR); W 3–1 ^{PP} | 3rd place, bronze medalist(s) |
| Maria Prevolaraki | Women's −53 kg | Wendle (GER); L 1–3 ^{PP} | Did not advance | | | | |

== See also ==
- Greece at the 2024 Winter Youth Olympics
