= 2021 European Rowing U23 Championships =

European Rowing championships

- Venue: Kruszwica regatta course
- Location: Kruszwica, Poland
- Dates: 4–5 September

The 5th European Rowing U23 Championships was the 5th edition and was held from 4 to 5 September 2021 at the Kruszwica regatta course in Kruszwica, Poland.

== Results ==
=== Medal summary ===
* Host nation (Poland)

Rank	Nation	Gold	Silver	Bronze	Total
1	Romania (ROU)	5	5	0	10
2	Italy (ITA)	4	2	3	9
3	Great Britain (GBR)	2	1	2	5
4	Bulgaria (BUL)	2	0	0	2
5	Turkey (TUR)	1	3	0	4
6	Germany (GER)	1	2	4	7
7	Greece (GRE)	1	1	1	3
8	Czech Republic (CZE)	1	0	1	2
8	Lithuania (LTU)	1	0	1	2
10	Austria (AUT)	1	0	0	1
10	Belgium (BEL)	1	0	0	1
10	Croatia (CRO)	1	0	0	1
10	Russia (RUS)	1	0	0	1
14	Poland (POL)*	0	3	4	7
15	Switzerland (SUI)	0	3	1	4
16	Belarus (BLR)	0	1	2	3
17	Norway (NOR)	0	1	0	1
18	Hungary (HUN)	0	0	1	1
18	Ukraine (UKR)	0	0	1	1
Totals (19 entries)		22	22	21	65

=== Men ===
Event	Gold		Silver		Bronze	
BLM1x	Lazar Penev; Bulgaria	7:02.13	Lars Benske; Norway	7:04.15	Nikita Mohr; Germany	7:05.33
BLM2-	Italy; Giacomo Gallo; Francesco Torta	6:45.53	Turkey; Samet Kaban; Denizhan Aydin	6:49.69	Germany; Jurek Sauter; Alexander Gross	6:50.45
BLM2x	Belgium; Marlon Colpaert; Tibo Vyvey	6:17.42	Turkey; Enes Gök; Şefik Çakmak	6:21.87	Switzerland; Gian Struzina; Raphaël Ahumada Ireland	6:21.89
BLM4x	Germany; Adrian Reinstädtler; Jacob Waldhelm; Oskar Kroglowski; Zeno Robertson	5:59.90	Italy; Lorenzo Luisetti; Alessandro Pozzi; Emanuele Castino; Michele Venini	6:03.07	Hungary; Henry Egon Bridge; Tamás Fenyodi; Csikó Pálfai; Balázs Szöllősi	6:03.35
BM1x	Emil Neykov; Bulgaria	6:52.23	Kai Schätzle; Switzerland	6:54.57	Piotr Plominski; Poland	6:56.05
BM2-	Lithuania; Dovydas Stankūnas; Domantas Stankūnas	6:28.47	Romania; Dumitru Ciobică; Florin Lehaci	6:28.96	Italy; Paolo Covini; Giovanni Codato	6:34.1
BM2x	Great Britain; Nathan Hull; Callum Dixon	6:15.06	Greece; Iasonas Exarchou; Christos Stergiakas	6:19.27	Belarus; Ivan Brynza; Yahor Shliupski	6:21.88
BM4-	Romania; Ștefan Berariu; Alexandru-Laurențiu Danciu; Florin Arteni; Ciprian Huc	5:58.98	Poland; Patryk Wojtalak; Emil Jackowiak; Przemysław Wanat; Oskar Streich	6:01.23	Belarus; Dzianis Klimiato; Aliaksandr Yaskel; Aliaksei Bandziuk; Anton Kupalau	6:02.20
BM4+	Italy; Andrea Carando; Davide Verità; Alessandro Bonamoneta; Nunzio Di Colandrea; Emanuele Capponi	6:09.01	Romania; Andrei Mândrilă; Nicu-Iulian Chelaru; Florin Ceobanu; Claudiu Neamtu; Gavril Dumbrava	6:10.53	Great Britain; Bruce Turnell; Joshua Burke; Jake Wincomb; Thomas Shewell; Joseph Salter	6:15.28
BM4x	Czech Republic; Daniel Nosek; Tomáš Šišma; Dalibor Neděla; Filip Zima	5:47.74	Belarus; Uladzislau Lokun; Artsem Laputsin; Yauheni Zalaty; Kiryl Tsikhanovich	5:49.94	Italy; Lorenzo Gaione; Leonardo Tedoldi; Francesco Molinari; Pietro Cangialosi	5:51.69
BM8+	Great Britain; Isaac Workman; Theodore Darlow; James Forward; Henry Marles; James Doran; Joshua Jones; Jack Prior; Frederick Allinson; William Le Brocq	5:31.03	Romania; Dumitru-Valentin Bucur; Dorin Simion; Andrei Mândrilă; Nicu-Iulian Chelaru; Florin Ceobanu; Marian Cireașă; Andrei Lungu; Alexandru Gherasim; Gavril Dumbrava	5:33.52	Germany; Sören Henkel; Paul Burger; Jannik Metzger; Sönke Kruse; Ole Kruse; Frederik Breuer; Paul Klapperich; Julius Lingnau; Florian Wünscher	5:35.49

=== Women ===
Event	Gold		Silver		Bronze	
BLW1x	Lara Tiefenthaler; Austria	7:46.37	Olivia Bates; Great Britain	7:46.93	Eleni Marina Leventelli; Greece	7:47.77
BLW2-	Italy; María Zerboni; Greta Parravicini	7:30.20	Turkey; Ebru Akinal; Nigar Hatun Demiroğlu	7:32.09	Poland; Kornelia Semrau; Zofia Borzyszkowska	7:33.56
BLW2x	Turkey; Mervenur Uslu; Elis Özbay	6:59.42	Poland; Zuzanna Jasińska; Wiktoria Kalinowska	7:04.73	Italy; Elena Sali; Ilaria Corazza	7:07.60
BLW4x	Italy; Maria Sole Perugino; Sara Borghi; Greta Schwartz; Matilde Barison	6:48.05	Germany; Lucia Wenske; Laura Heinemann; Finja Lara Rothhardt; Lilith Lensing	6:51.11	no boat	
BW1x	Simona Radiș; Romania	7:26.39	Aurelia-Maxima Janzen; Switzerland	7:30.34	Anna Šantrůčková; Czech Republic	7:32.76
BW2-	Croatia; Ivana Jurković; Josipa Jurković	7:09.93	Romania; Adriana Ailincăi; Alina Maria Baletchi	7:11.35	Ukraine; Svitlana Skrobalo; Viktoriia Nahorna	7:25.88
BW2x	Greece; Evangelia Anastasiadou; Evangelia Fragkou	6:55.94	Romania; Cristina Druga; Alexandra Ungureanu	6:57.10	Lithuania; Martyna Kazlauskaitė; Dovilė Rimkutė	6:58.44
BW4-	Romania; Andreea Popa; Maria Tivodariu; Maria-Magdalena Rusu; Dumitrita Juncanariu	6:36.13	Poland; Anna Potrzuska; Izabela Pawlak; Zuzanna Lesner; Weronika Kaźmierczak	6:42.48	Great Britain; Hannah Cooper; Georgina Robinson Ranger; Isabelle Hawes; Phoebe Snowden	6:45.95
BW4+	Romania; Amalia Bucu; Larisa-Andreea Bogdan; Manuela-Gabriela Lungu; Cosmina-Maria Podaru; Victoria-Stefania Petreanu	7:05.64	Italy; Dora Tufano; Giulia Landolf; Alice Dorci; Andrea Alfano; Alessandra Faella	7:07.87	Germany; Lena Radke; Celina Waldschmidt; Leandra Reich; Chiara Kracklauer; Janne-Marit Börger	7:10.37
BW4x	Russia; Anastasiia Liubich; Tatiana Ustselemova; Iana Merenkova; Elizaveta Kovina	6:25.06	Switzerland; Salome Ulrich; Nina Wettstein; Lisa Lötscher; Célia Dupré	6:29.67	Poland; Barbara Streng; Paulina Chrzanowska; Katarzyna Duda; Barbara Jechorek	6:32.06
BW8+	Romania; Estera-Costina-Beatrice Vîlceanu; Larisa-Elena Roşu; Adriana Ailincăi; Maria Tivodariu; Alice-Elena Turcanu; Raluca-Georgiana Dinulescu; Maria-Magdalena Rusu; Simona Radiș; Victoria-Stefania Petreanu	6:13.66	Germany; Sarjana Klamp; Annika Elsen; Paula Gerundt; Lena Hansen; Annabelle Bachmann; Lene Mührs; Patricia Schwarzhuber; Elisa Patzelt; Annalena Fisch	6:24.58	Poland; Iga Krzemińska; Małgorzata Strybel; Martyna Jankowska; Ewelina Janiak; Adrianna Paszkowska; Weronika Ludwiczak; Jessica Sobocińska; Julia Weiwer; Katarzyna Pawełczak	6:28.41
