= 2025 World Rowing Championships – Mixed double sculls =

Mixed double sculls at the 2025 World Rowing Championships
- Venue: Dianshan Lake
- Location: Shanghai, China
- Dates: 28 September
- Competitors: 22 from 11 nations
- Winning time: 6:24.22

Medalists
gold medal	Fintan McCarthy; Margaret Cremen	Ireland
silver medal	Roos de Jong; Melvin Twellaar	Netherlands
bronze medal	Celia Dupre; Raphaël Ahumada	Switzerland

The mixed double sculls competition at the 2025 World Rowing Championships took place at Dianshan Lake, in Shanghai.

== Schedule ==
The schedule was as follows:

Date	Time	Round
Sunday 28 September 2025	10:05	Heats
Sunday 28 September 2025	13:35	Final B
Sunday 28 September 2025	14:44	Final A

All times are UTC+08:00

== Results ==
=== Heats ===
The two fastest boats in each heat and the two fastest times advanced directly to Final A. The remaining boats were sent to Final B.

==== Heat 1 ====
Rank	Rower	Country	Time	Notes
1	Fintan McCarthy; Margaret Cremen	Ireland	6:39.07	FA, WB
2	Celia Dupre; Raphaël Ahumada	Switzerland	6:40.08	FA
3	Alice Gnatta; Niels Torre	Italy	6:41.11	FA
4	Chen Yunxia; Liu Baishun	China	6:44.10	FA
5	Kathryn Glen; Benjamin Mason	New Zealand	6:48.90	FB
6	Katherine Flynn; Jacob Plihal	United States	7:02.87	FB

==== Heat 2 ====
Rank	Rower	Country	Time	Notes
1	Andrei Cornea; Ioana Madalina Cornea	Romania	6:41.49	FA
2	Roos de Jong; Melvin Twellaar	Netherlands	6:42.49	FA
3	Ole Hohensee; Pia Greiten	Germany	6:45.96	FB
4	Ugnė Juzėnaitė; Arnedas Kelmelis	Lithuania	6:49.38	FB
5	Hanna Prakatsen; Dilshodjon Khudoyberdiev	Uzbekistan	6:53.07	FB

=== Finals ===
The A final determined the rankings for places 1 to 6. Additional rankings were determined in the other finals.

==== Final B ====
Rank	Rower	Country	Time	Total rank
1	Katherine Flynn; Jacob Plihal	United States	6:46.15	7
2	Kathryn Glen; Benjamin Mason	New Zealand	6:48.19	8
3	Ugnė Juzėnaitė; Arnedas Kelmelis	Lithuania	6:49.22	9
4	Ole Hohensee; Pia Greiten	Germany	6:52.89	10
5	Hanna Prakatsen; Dilshodjon Khudoyberdiev	Uzbekistan	6:56.71	11

==== Final A ====
Rank	Rower	Country	Time	Notes
1st place, gold medalist(s)	Fintan McCarthy; Margaret Cremen	Ireland	6:24.22	WB
2nd place, silver medalist(s)	Roos de Jong; Melvin Twellaar	Netherlands	6:24.91	
3rd place, bronze medalist(s)	Celia Dupre; Raphaël Ahumada	Switzerland	6:27.18	
4	Alice Gnatta; Niels Torre	Italy	6:27.25	
5	Chen Yunxia; Liu Baishun	China	6:32.44	
6	Andrei Cornea; Ioana Madalina Cornea	Romania	6:52.35	
