= 2024 World Rowing Championships – Men's lightweight coxless pair =

Men's lightweight coxless pair at the 2024 World Rowing Championships
- Venue: Royal Canadian Henley Rowing Course
- Location: St. Catharines, Canada
- Dates: 20–24 August
- Competitors: 10 from 5 nations
- Teams: 5
- Winning time: 6:34.78

Medalists
gold medal	Konrad Hultsch; Paul Ruttmann	Austria
silver medal	Matías Ramírez; Alberto Portillo	Paraguay
bronze medal	Nichita Naumciuc; Dmitrii Zincenc	Moldova

The men's lightweight coxless pair competition at the 2024 World Rowing Championships took place in St. Catharines between 20 and 24 August 2024.

== Schedule ==
The schedule was as follows:

Date	Time	Round
Tuesday 20 August 2024	09:40	Preliminary race
Saturday 24 August 2024	15:32	Final

All times are Eastern Daylight Time (UTC-4)

== Results ==
=== Preliminary round ===
All boats advanced to the final.

Rank	Rower	Country	Time	Notes
1	Konrad Hultsch; Paul Ruttmann	Austria	7:28.66	F
2	Matías Ramírez; Alberto Portillo	Paraguay	7:42.52	F
3	Nichita Naumciuc; Dmitrii Zincenc	Moldova	7:52.10	F
4	Siwakorn Wongpin; Nawamin Dechudomrat	Thailand	8:01.77	F
5	Davit Lashkareishvili; Giorgi Kanteladze	Georgia	8:37.40	F

=== Final ===
Rank	Rower	Country	Time
1st place, gold medalist(s)	Konrad Hultsch; Paul Ruttmann	Austria	6:34.78
2nd place, silver medalist(s)	Matías Ramírez; Alberto Portillo	Paraguay	6:42.54
3rd place, bronze medalist(s)	Nichita Naumciuc; Dmitrii Zincenc	Moldova	6:44.57
4	Siwakorn Wongpin; Nawamin Dechudomrat	Thailand	6:44.72
5	Davit Lashkareishvili; Giorgi Kanteladze	Georgia	7:05.57
