= Gabor Csepregi =

Canadian water polo player (born 1950)

Personal information
- Nationality: Canadian
- Born: 17 May 1950 (age 76) Budapest, Hungary

Sport
- Sport: Water polo

Gabor Csepregi (born 17 May 1950) is a Canadian water polo player. He competed at the 1972 Summer Olympics and the 1976 Summer Olympics.
