= Paul Ruttmann =

Austrian rower and triathlete

Personal information
- Nationality: Austria
- Born: 22 August 1985 (age 40)

Sport
- Sport: Rowing (until 2013; 2023–present); Triathlon (until 2023)
Medal record
Rowing
Representing Austria
European Championships
| Gold medal – first place | 2024 Szeged | LM2- |
World Championships
| Gold medal – first place | 2024 St. Catharines | LM2- |

Paul Ruttmann (born 22 August 1985) is an Austrian rower and triathlete. He competed at the 2024 World Rowing Championships, winning the gold medal in the men's lightweight coxless pair event.
