= Niels Torre =

Italian rower (born 1999)

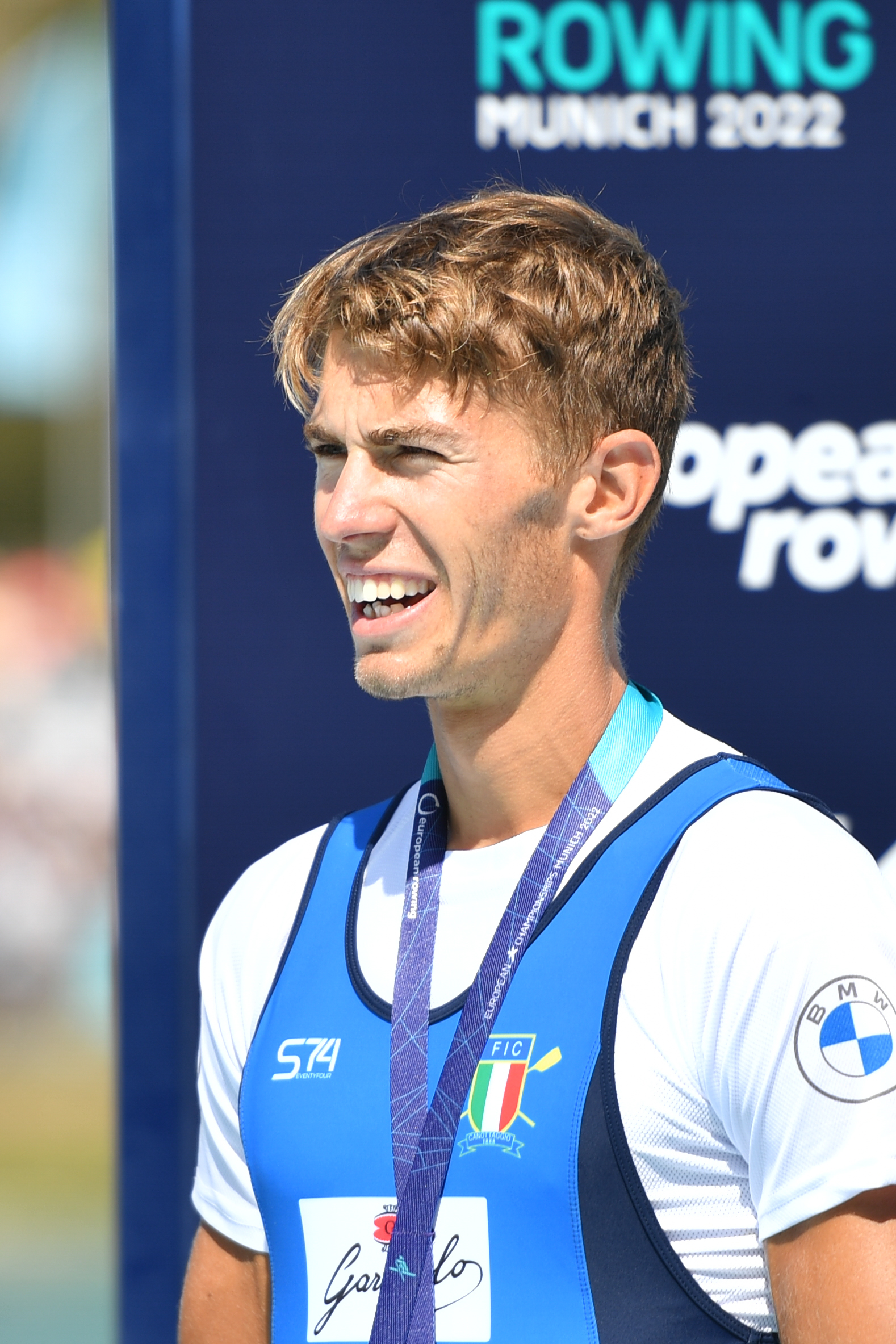

Personal information
- Full name: Niels Alexander Torre
- Nationality: Italian
- Born: 3 September 1999 (age 26) Volterra, Italy

Sport
- Country: Italy
- Sport: Rowing
- Event: Lightweight
Medal record
Men's rowing
Representing Italy
World Championships
Gold medal – first place	2022 Račice	LM4x
Silver medal – second place	2023 Belgrade	LM1x
Bronze medal – third place	2024 St. Catharines	LM1x
European Championships
Gold medal – first place	2021 Varese	LM4x
Gold medal – first place	2022 Oberschleißheim	LM4x
Gold medal – first place	2024 Szeged	LM1x
Silver medal – second place	2020 Poznań	LM1x
Silver medal – second place	2023 Bled	LM1x
Bronze medal – third place	2026 Varese	Mix2x

Niels Alexander Torre (born 3 September 1999) is an Italian world champion rower. He won the 2022 world championship title in the Italian men's lightweight quad scull.

Previously, he had won a gold medal at the 2022 European Rowing Championships and a silver medal at the 2020 European Rowing Championships.

He set the world best time in the lightweight single sculls at the 2024 World Rowing Championships.
