= Raphaël Ahumada =

Swiss rower (born 2001)

Personal information
- Nationality: Swiss
- Born: 20 May 2001 (age 25)

Sport
- Sport: Rowing
- Event: Lightweight double sculls
Medal record
Men's rowing
Representing Switzerland
World Championships
Silver medal – second place	2023 Belgrade	Lwt double sculls
Bronze medal – third place	2025 Shanghai	Mixed double sculls
European Championships
Gold medal – first place	2024 Szeged	Lwt double sculls
Gold medal – first place	2023 Bled	Lwt double sculls
Bronze medal – third place	2022 Oberschleißheim	Lwt double sculls

Raphaël Ahumada (born 20 May 2001) is a Swiss rower. He competed at the 2024 Summer Olympics in the lightweight double sculls.

== Career ==
He won bronze at the 2021 European Rowing U23 Championships in Poland alongside Gian Struzina in the lightweight double sculls.

Alongside Jan Schäuble, he won his first World Cup event in the lightweight double sculls in Belgrade in February 2022.

They won bronze at the 2022 European Rowing Championships in Munich in the Men’s lightweight double sculls.

The pair won silver at the 2023 World Rowing Championships in the Men's lightweight double sculls in Belgrade.

The pair won the gold medal at the 2023 European Rowing Championships and retained their title at the 2024 European Rowing Championships in Szeged.

They were selected to compete at the 2024 Paris Olympics where they qualified for the semi finals.

Alongside Celia Dupre, he won the bronze medal in the mixed double sculls at the 2025 World Rowing Championships in Shanghai, China.

== Personal life ==
He studies architecture at École Polytechnique Fédérale de Lausanne. His sister is also an international rower.
