= Redmond Matthews =

Australian rower

Personal information
- Nationality: Australian
- Born: 31 January 1992 (age 34)
- Home town: Melbourne, Victoria, Australia
- Years active: 2013–
- Height: 179 cm (5 ft 10 in)
- Weight: 71 kg (157 lb)

Sport
- Country: Australia
- Sport: Rowing
- Event: Lightweight sculler
- Club: Mercantile Rowing Club
- Coached by: Rhett Ayliffe, Lyall McCarthy, Mark Prater, David Fraumano

Redmond Matthews (born 31 January 1992) is an Australian representative lightweight rower. He is a three-time Australian national champion, and has represented twice at World Championships.

== Club and state rowing ==
His Australian senior club rowing has been from the Mercantile Rowing Club in Melbourne. He won the lightweight sculling title at the 2012 national Australian University Championships racing for Monash University. In 2013 he raced for Australia at the World University Games - the 2013 Summer Universiade held in Kazan, Russia. He won his semi-final.

Matthews began competing in Mercantile colours in the open division at the Australian national championships in 2012. He raced for national championships in the LW8+ in 2012, 2015, 2017 and 2019; the LWM1X in 2013, 2014, 2017, 2019 and 2022; the LW2X in 2017; the LW4X in 2014; the LM4- in 2019; and the open-weight single in 2021. He won those national titles in the lightweight coxless four in 2019 and in the lightweight single scull in 2022.

Matthews first made state selection for Victoria in the 2013 lightweight men's four contesting the Penrith Cup at the Interstate Regatta. He was further selected in Victorian Penrith Cup fours in 2014, 2015, 2017 and 2019. In that 2019 crew he won the Australian title. In 2021 and 2022 he raced as Victoria's representative single sculler in the President's Cup, taking the bronze medal in that event in 2022.

== International representative rowing ==
Matthews made his Australian representative debut in a lightweight double scull at the 2013 World Rowing Cup I in Sydney. He next raced for Australia in a lightweight quad at the 2017 World Rowing Cup III in Lucerne. His first appearance at a World Championship was in 2017 in the Australian lightweight quad at the 2017 World Rowing Championships in Sarasota, Florida. That crew finished in overall twelfth place.

In March 2022 Matthews was selected for the lightweight double scull within a broader Australian training team to prepare for the 2022 international season and the 2022 World Rowing Championships. He competed in the LM2X at both the World Rowing Cup II on Poznan and at WRC III in Lucerne. At the 2022 World Rowing Championships at Racize, he rowed Australia's representative lightweight double scull with Oscar McGuinness. They made the C final in which they finished fifth, for an overall seventeenth place at the regatta.
