= Fintan McCarthy =

Irish rower Olympic gold medalist

Personal information
- Nationality: Irish
- Born: 23 November 1996 (age 29) Cork, Ireland
- Height: 1.77 m (5 ft 10 in)

Sport
- Country: Ireland
- Sport: Rowing
- Events: Lightweight double sculls, Single Sculls
- Club: Skibbereen Rowing Club
Medal record
Men's rowing
Representing Ireland
Olympic Games
Gold medal – first place	2024 Paris	Lwt double sculls
Gold medal – first place	2020 Tokyo	Lwt double sculls
World Championships
Gold medal – first place	2019 Ottensheim	Lwt double sculls
Gold medal – first place	2022 Račice	Lwt double sculls
Gold medal – first place	2023 Belgrade	Lwt double sculls
Gold medal – first place	2025 Shanghai	Mixed double sculls
Bronze medal – third place	2025 Shanghai	Double sculls
European Championships
Gold medal – first place	2021 Varese	Lwt double sculls
Gold medal – first place	2022 Oberschleißheim	Lwt double sculls
Bronze medal – third place	2020 Poznań	Lwt single sculls
Bronze medal – third place	2025 Plovdiv	Double sculls

Fintan McCarthy (born 23 November 1996) is an Irish rower. He is an Irish national champion, world champion and double Olympic gold medallist. He won the men's lightweight double sculls championship title with Paul O'Donovan at the 2019 World Rowing Championships and at the 2020 Tokyo Olympics where he set a new world's best time for that event. He also won a bronze medal in lightweight single sculls at the 2020 European Rowing Championships.

== Career ==
McCarthy is from Skibbereen, County Cork. His first experience in rowing was while in primary school, but only started taking the sport seriously when he was 15 after seeing the London Olympics in 2012. He studied at University College Cork and graduated with a degree in physiology.

McCarthy won his first national title in rowing with his brother Jake in 2016. The brothers qualified for the European Rowing Championships final in 2019.

In 2019, he was partnered with Paul O'Donovan in the men's lightweight double sculls at the World Rowing Championships held at Linz-Ottensheim in Austria, where they won the gold medal and the world championship title. In 2020, he won a bronze in the men's lightweight single sculls at the 2020 European Rowing Championships held in Poznań, Poland.

McCarthy raced with O'Donovan at the 2021 European Rowing Championships, where they won gold. The following month they won gold again at the World Rowing Cup II regatta in Lucerne. At the 2020 Tokyo Olympics, held in July 2021, the pair set a world's best time of 6:05:33 while winning their semifinal of the lightweight double sculls event. They went on to win the gold medal, finishing ahead of the German and Italian teams.

McCarthy and O'Donovan once again represented Ireland at the 2024 Summer Olympics, claiming their second successive gold medal in the lightweight double sculls.
