= Tibo Vyvey =

Belgian rower

Personal information
- Nationality: Belgian
- Born: 16 December 2000 (age 25)

Sport
- Sport: Rowing
- Club: KRB - Koninklijke Roeivereniging Brugge
Medal record
Men's rowing
Representing Belgium
World Championships
| Bronze medal – third place | 2026 Amsterdam | Double sculls |
World U23 Championships
| Bronze medal – third place | 2021 Račice | Lwt double sculls |
European U23 Championships
| Gold medal – first place | 2020 Duisburg | Lwt double sculls |
| Gold medal – first place | 2021 Kruszwica | Lwt double sculls |

Tibo Vyvey is a Belgian competitive rower.

== Career ==
Vyvey won first places at the European Rowing U23 Championships in the lightweight men's Double scull in 2020 in Duisburg, Germany and in 2021 in Kruszwica, Poland. He also won a bronze at the World Rowing U23 Championships in the same category in 2021 in Račice, Czech Republic. In July 2022, while competing at the World Rowing U23 Championships in Varese, Italy and after winning his semi-final in the lightweight men's Single scull, he suffered a cerebral thrombosis. After a long and difficult rehabilitation, he was cleared by medical doctors to compete again and on 28 April 2024, he and his rowing partner Niels Van Zandweghe qualified for the 2024 Summer Olympics in Paris, France in the lightweight men's Double scull. At the Olympics, they finished nineth.

As it was decided to replace the lightweight classes by coastal rowing for the 2028 Summer Olympics in Los Angeles, Vyvey took time after Paris to fully adapt to heavy rowing and focus on his physiotherapy studies. Having finished second at the Belgium national championships in the men's heavy single scull in early 2026, his former partner Niels Van Zandweghe having retired from the sport in 2025, the selection committee of the Belgium Rowing Federation decided to pair Vyvey with Aaron Andries in Belgium men's double scull boat replacing Tristan Vandenbussche. The new pairing was immediately successful, taking a silver medal at the end of May at the 2026 World Rowing Cup leg in Seville, Spain, Vivey's first ever World Cup medal.. A month later, the pairing surprised everyone by taking the gold and overall 2026 men's double scull World Rowing Cup victory at the prestigious Lucerne Rotsee Regattas in Switzerland. It was the first World Rowing Cup victory in a quarter century for a Belgian pairing since Bjorn Hendrickx and Stijn Smulders. The pair disappointed at the 2026 European Rowing Championships in Varese, Italy, finishing seventh, but redeemed themselves in August at the 2026 World Rowing Championships in Amsterdam, The Netherlands, winning the bronze and first ever medal at a World Rowing Championships for a Belgian boat in the men's double sculls.
