= Célia Dupré =

Swiss rower (born 2001)

Personal information
- Nationality: Swiss
- Born: 30 August 2001 (age 24)

Sport
- Sport: Rowing
Medal record
Women's rowing
Representing Switzerland
World Championships
| Bronze medal – third place | 2025 Shanghai | Mixed double sculls |
European Championships
| Gold medal – first place | 2026 Varese | W4x |

Célia Dupré (born 30 August 2001) is a Swiss rower. She competed at the 2024 Olympic Games and was a bronze medalist at the 2025 World Rowing Championships in the mixed double sculls.

== Early life ==
From Geneva, Dupré was homeschooled until she was fourteen years-old. Her mother was a rower and introduced her to the sport at an early age; she quickly showed aptitude for the sport, winning as an eleven year-old at a regional championships, competing against 18 year-olds. She studied human biology in the United States at Stanford University.

== Career ==
Dupre won the NCAA Championships in the United States for the Stanford Cardinals in 2023 as the seven seat on the Cardinal’s varsity eight boat.

She was a finalist for Switzerland at the 2024 Summer Olympics in Paris, France in the women's quadruple sculls.

She competed at the World Rowing Cup in 2025, placing seventh in the pair and raced that year at the Henley Regatta in the Redwood Scullers USA boat alongside fellow Olympian and Stanford Cardinal Esther Briz and former U23 World Champion Iris Klok.

Alongside Raphaël Ahumada, she won the bronze medal in the mixed double sculls at the 2025 World Rowing Championships in Shanghai, China.
