= Paul O'Donovan =

Irish rower (born 1994)

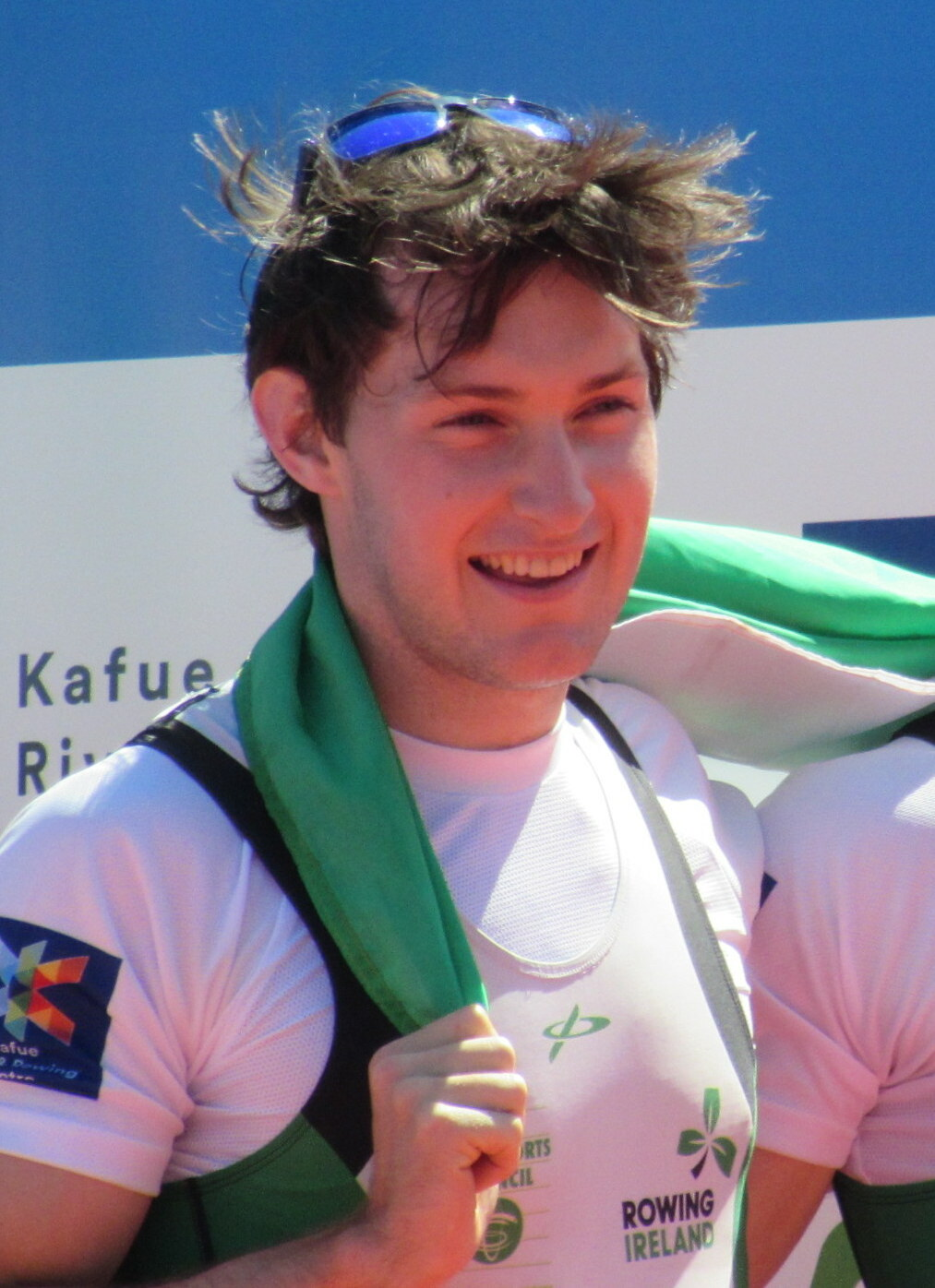
- O'Donovan at the 2016 European Rowing Championships

Personal information
- Nationality: Irish
- Born: 19 April 1994 (age 32) Lisheen, County Cork, Ireland
- Home town: Skibbereen, County Cork
- Height: 1.77 m (5 ft 10 in)
- Weight: 74 kg (163 lb)

Sport
- Country: Ireland
- Sport: Rowing
- Events: Lightweight double sculls Lightweight single sculls
- Club: UCC Rowing Club
- Coached by: Teddy O'Donovan; Dominic Casey

Achievements and titles
- Olympicfinals: Gold medal (Lightweight double sculls, Tokyo 2020); Gold Medal (Lightweight double sculls, Paris 2024); Silver medal (Lightweight double sculls, Rio de Janeiro 2016)
Medal record
Men's rowing
Representing Ireland
Olympic Games
Gold medal – first place	2020 Tokyo	Lwt double sculls
Gold medal – first place	2024 Paris	Lwt double sculls
Silver medal – second place	2016 Rio de Janeiro	Lwt double sculls
World Championships
Gold medal – first place	2016 Rotterdam	Lwt single sculls
Gold medal – first place	2017 Sarasota	Lwt single sculls
Gold medal – first place	2018 Plovdiv	Lwt double sculls
Gold medal – first place	2019 Ottensheim	Lwt double sculls
Gold medal – first place	2022 Račice	Lwt double sculls
Gold medal – first place	2023 Belgrade	Lwt double sculls
Gold medal – first place	2024 St. Catharines	Lwt single sculls
European Championships
Gold medal – first place	2016; Brandenburg an der Havel	Lwt double sculls
Gold medal – first place	2021 Varese	Lwt double sculls
Gold medal – first place	2022 Oberschleißheim	Lwt double sculls
Silver medal – second place	2017 Račice	Lwt double sculls
Silver medal – second place	2018 Glasgow	Lwt double sculls
World U23 Championships
Bronze medal – third place	2013 Ottensheim	Lwt single sculls

Paul O'Donovan (born 19 April 1994) is an Irish lightweight rower. He is a double Olympic champion in the lightweight double sculls, where he set a world's best time for that event, and a seven-time world champion in single and double sculls.

O'Donovan first won a world championship in the men's lightweight single sculls at the 2016 World Rowing Championships. Together with his brother Gary, he won silver in the Men's lightweight double sculls at the 2016 Summer Olympics, and gold in the same discipline at the 2018 World Rowing Championships. Since 2019, he also partnered with Fintan McCarthy for lightweight double sculls events. The pair became world champions at the 2019 World Rowing Championships, gold medalists at the 2021 European Rowing Championships, gold medalists (and world best time holders) at the 2020 Tokyo Olympics and gold medalists again at the 2024 Paris Olympics. The latter success made O'Donovan the most successful Irish Olympian, winning medals at three Olympics.

At the 2024 Irish Indoor Rowing Championships, he set a national record on the 2000m ergometer and became the third lightweight man to break six-minutes with a time of 5:58.4.

In a poll taken in August 2024, during the 2024 Paris Olympics, he was voted "Ireland's greatest-ever Olympian".

In December 2024, O'Donovan was named RTÉ Sportsperson of the Year 2024.

== Early life ==
O'Donovan was born on 19 April 1994 in Lisheen near Skibbereen, County Cork, to Teddy and Trish O'Donovan. Like his elder brother Gary, he attended Lisheen National School and St Fachtna's De La Salle secondary school in Skibbereen. Paul O'Donovan entered UCD in 2012 on an Ad Astra Elite Athlete Scholarship and graduated with a BSc in Physiotherapy from University College Dublin in 2017. He went on to University College Cork where he studied Graduate Entry Medicine, receiving a Quercus Sports' Scholarship and graduating in May 2023 with first class honours.

O'Donovan was introduced to rowing in 2001 aged around seven when his father took the two brothers to Skibbereen Rowing Club. His father, himself a rower, coached them in the sport and remained a coach to O'Donovan until 2013.

He is the third cousin of Irish Olympic rowing bronze medalist Emily Hegarty.

== Rowing career ==
In 2008, the O'Donovan brothers were selected for the Irish junior team at the Home International Regatta held in Cardiff, Wales, and won gold in the junior quad sculls. Paul O'Donovan also competed in the single sculls; he became the junior single sculls champion of Ireland when he was 15 and was placed fourth in the 2011 World Junior Championships. When he was 19, he won the bronze medal in the men's lightweight sculls at the World Rowing U23 Championships held in Linz, Austria.

=== 2016 ===
In April 2016. Paul and Gary O'Donovan won silver in the lightweight double sculls at the first World Rowing Cup events of the year in Varese, Italy. In the following month in May 2016, the pair won the 2016 European Rowing Championships gold medal in Brandenburg, Germany.

The O'Donovan brothers had narrowly qualified for the Rio Olympics by beating Greece at the 2015 World Championship. In August 2016 at the Rio Olympics, the O'Donovan brothers won silver behind France in the lightweight double sculls, the first rowing medal won by Ireland at the Olympics.

Two weeks later, he won the lightweight single sculls final at the 2016 World Rowing Championships in Rotterdam, Netherlands.

=== 2017 ===
The brothers finished in the silver position in men's lightweight double sculls at the 2017 European Rowing Championships. They also won silver at the second World Rowing Cup regatta of the season in Poland in June, and bronze at the third in July.

At the 2017 World Rowing Championships in Florida, Paul O'Donovan won gold at the lightweight men's single sculls. His brother Gary was ill and they did not take part in the lightweight men's double sculls event.

=== 2018 ===
During 2018, the O'Donovan brothers won silver in the lightweight double sculls at the 2018 European Rowing Championships in August, and became world champions in the same discipline at the 2018 World Rowing Championships in September.

=== 2019 ===
O'Donovan was paired with Fintan McCarthy instead of his brother Gary at the 2019 World Rowing Championships held at Linz-Ottensheim in Austria. The pair won gold in the lightweight double sculls event, which ensured qualification for the Irish team at the 2020 Summer Olympics in Tokyo.

=== 2021 ===
O'Donovan raced with McCarthy at the 2021 European Rowing Championships, where they won gold. The following month they won gold again at the World Rowing Cup II regatta in Lucerne.

At the 2020 Tokyo Olympics, held in July 2021, the pair set a world's best time of 6:05:33 while winning their semifinal of the lightweight double sculls event. They went on to win the gold medal, finishing ahead of the German and Italian teams.

=== 2022 ===
After spending some of 2022 in Australia as part of his medical studies, O'Donovan reunited with McCarthy to claim gold for a 2nd year in a row at the 2022 European Rowing Championships.

=== 2023 ===
O'Donovan and McCarthy won their 3rd world title together after winning their title in Belgrade in the Double Sculls also qualifying for the Paris 2024 Olympics

=== 2024 ===
O'Donovan and McCarthy once again represented Ireland at the 2024 Summer Olympics, claiming their second successive gold medal in the lightweight double sculls and also becoming the only Irish Olympian to medal at three games. Just a few weeks after his Olympic success O'Donovan won gold in the Single Sculls at the World Championships in Canada.
