= Oscar McGuinness =

Australian rower (born 1999)

Personal information
- Nationality: Australian
- Born: 19 December 1999 (age 25)
- Home town: Adelaide, Australia
- Height: 179 cm (5 ft 10 in)

Sport
- Country: Australia
- Sport: Rowing
- Club: Adelaide Rowing Club
- Coached by: David Fraumano

Oscar McGuinness (born 19 December 1999) is an Australian representative lightweight rower. He has represented at senior World Championships.

== Club and state rowing ==
McGuinness was raised in Adelaide and educated at St Peter's College, Adelaide where he took up rowing. He is the son of former Australian rules football player Tony McGuinness and Adelaide news presenter Georgina McGuinness.

Oscar's senior rowing has been from The Blackmore Club and the Adelaide Rowing Club. He first made state selection for South Australia in the 2017 men's youth eight which contested the Noel Wilkinson Trophy at the Interstate Regatta within the Australian Rowing Championships. He made a second South Australian youth eight appearance in 2018.

== International representative rowing ==
In March 2022 McGuinness was selected in the Australian senior training team to prepare for the 2022 international season and the 2022 World Rowing Championships. He competed as a lightweight men's single sculler at both World Rowing Cups in June and July 2022. His World Championship debut was at the 2022 World Rowing Championships at Racize, where he rowed Australia's representative lightweight double scull with Redmond Matthews. They made the C final in which they finished fifth, for an overall seventeenth place at the regatta.

In March 2023 McGuinness was again selected as a sculler in the Australian men's lightweight squad for the 2023 international season. At the Rowing World Cup II in Varese, Italy McGuinness raced as Australia's MLW2X entrant with Sean Murphy.They made the B final and finished in overall seventh place. At 2023's RWC III in Lucerne, McGuinness and Murphy again raced the MLW2X. They were beaten out of 2nd place in the repechage by 9/100th of a second, made the C final which they won for an overall 13th place at the regatta. Murphy and McGuinness were selected to race Australia's double scull at 2023 World Rowing Championships in Belgrade, Serbia. They placed fourth in their heat, progressing to the quarter-finals. They ultimately finished fourth in the C final for an overall 16th place at the regatta.
