= 2024 World Rowing Championships – Men's lightweight single sculls =

Men's lightweight single sculls at the 2024 World Rowing Championships
- Venue: Royal Canadian Henley Rowing Course
- Location: St. Catharines, Canada
- Dates: 18–24 August
- Competitors: 21 from 21 nations
- Winning time: 6:49.68

Medalists
gold medal	Paul O'Donovan	Ireland
silver medal	Antonios Papakonstantinou	Greece
bronze medal	Niels Torre	Italy

The men's lightweight single sculls competition at the 2024 World Rowing Championships took place in St. Catharines between 18 and 24 August 2024.

== Schedule ==
The schedule was as follows:

Date	Time	Round
Sunday 18 August 2024	14:30	Heats
Monday 19 August 2024	14:30	Repechages
Thursday 22 August 2024	11:49	Semifinals C/D
Friday 23 August 2024	11:09	Semifinals A/B
Saturday 24 August 2024	09:57	Final D
Saturday 24 August 2024	11:07	Final C
Saturday 24 August 2024	11:17	Final B
Saturday 24 August 2024	15:00	Final A

All times are Eastern Daylight Time (UTC−4)

== Results ==
=== Heats ===
The fastest boat advanced to Semifinal A/B. Remaining crews to Repechage.

==== Heat 1 ====
Rank	Rower	Country	Time	Notes
1	Samuel Melvin	United States	6:43.62	SAB
2	Marlon Colpaert	Belgium	6:56.09	R
3	Chiu Hin Chun	Hong Kong	6:57.58	R
4	Pedro Dickson	Argentina	6:58.65	R
5	Mitsuo Nishimura	Japan	6:59.02	R
6	Stephen Harris	Canada	7:14.78	R

==== Heat 2 ====
Rank	Rower	Country	Time	Notes
1	Niels Torre	Italy	6:39.56	SAB WB
2	Felipe Klüver	Uruguay	6:56.81	R
3	Baptiste Savaete	France	6:59.82	R
4	Ghaith Kadri	Tunisia	7:06.81	R
5	Lucas Salmon Hernandez	Peru	7:10.16	R

==== Heat 3 ====
Rank	Rower	Country	Time	Notes
1	Julian Schöberl	Austria	6:49.55	SAB
2	Sid Ali Boudina	Algeria	6:52.17	R
3	Paul Leerkamp	Germany	6:57.16	R
4	Antonios Papakonstantinou	Greece	7:04.32	R
5	Murray Bales-Smith	South Africa	7:07.05	R

==== Heat 4 ====
Rank	Rower	Country	Time	Notes
1	Paul O'Donovan	Ireland	6:41.98	SAB
2	Alexis López	Mexico	6:49.52	R
3	Oskar Soedal	Norway	7:07.53	R
4	Kasper Hirvilampi	Finland	7:20.48	R
5	Amel Younis	Palestine	7:24.71	R

=== Repechages ===
The two fastest boats in repechage advanced to the semifinals A/B. The remaining boats were sent to the semifinals C/D.

==== Repechage 1 ====
Rank	Rower	Country	Time	Notes
1	Alexis López	Mexico	7:57.44	SAB
2	Paul Leerkamp	Germany	7:59.90	SAB
3	Ghaith Kadri	Tunisia	8:10.71	SCD
4	Mitsuo Nishimura	Japan	8:15.79	SCD

==== Repechage 2 ====
Rank	Rower	Country	Time	Notes
1	Sid Ali Boudina	Algeria	7:51.56	SAB
2	Baptiste Savaete	France	8:21.81	SAB
3	Pedro Dickson	Argentina	8:09.18	SCD
4	Amel Younis	Palestine	8:24.32	SCD

==== Repechage 3 ====
Rank	Rower	Country	Time	Notes
1	Felipe Klüver	Uruguay	7:54.54	SAB
2	Chiu Hin Chun	Hong Kong	7:58.01	SAB
3	Murray Bales-Smith	South Africa	8:03.91	SCD
4	Kasper Hirvilampi	Finland	8:33.33	SCD

==== Repechage 4 ====
Rank	Rower	Country	Time	Notes
1	Antonios Papakonstantinou	Greece	7:43.26	SAB
2	Marlon Colpaert	Belgium	7:49.01	SAB
3	Stephen Harris	Canada	7:50.28	SCD
4	Oskar Soedal	Norway	8:10.59	SCD
5	Lucas Salmon Hernandez	Peru	8:39.54	SCD

=== Semifinals C/D ===
The three fastest boats in each semifinal advanced to the C final. The remaining boats were sent to the D final.

==== Semifinal 1 ====
Rank	Rower	Country	Time	Notes
1	Stephen Harris	Canada	7:19.63	FC
2	Ghaith Kadri	Tunisia	7:26.38	FC
3	Kasper Hirvilampi	Finland	7:29.14	FC
4	Amel Younis	Palestine	7:33.69	FD

==== Semifinal 2 ====
Rank	Rower	Country	Time	Notes
1	Mitsuo Nishimura	Japan	7:15.06	FC
2	Pedro Dickson	Argentina	7:20.41	FC
3	Oskar Soedal	Norway	7:24.10	FC
4	Lucas Salmon Hernandez	Peru	7:40.17	FD

=== Semifinals A/B ===
The three fastest boats in each semifinal advanced to the A final. The remaining boats were sent to the B final.

==== Semifinal 1 ====
Rank	Rower	Country	Time	Notes
1	Antonios Papakonstantinou	Greece	6:49.82	FA
2	Niels Torre	Italy	6:51.01	FA
3	Samuel Melvin	United States	6:51.96	FA
4	Paul Leerkamp	Germany	6:56.99	FB
5	Baptiste Savaete	France	7:06.85	FB
6	Felipe Klüver	Uruguay	7:07.40	FB

==== Semifinal 2 ====
Rank	Rower	Country	Time	Notes
1	Paul O'Donovan	Ireland	6:47.74	FA
2	Julian Schöberl	Austria	6:54.08	FA
3	Alexis López	Mexico	6:55.60	FA
4	Marlon Colpaert	Belgium	6:58.23	FB
5	Sid Ali Boudina	Algeria	6:59.19	FB
6	Chiu Hin Chun	Hong Kong	7:15.16	FB

=== Final ===
The A final determined the rankings for places 1 to 6. Additional rankings were determined in the other finals.

==== Final D ====
Rank	Rower	Country	Time	Total rank
1	Lucas Salmon Hernandez	Peru	7:15.15	19
2	Amel Younis	Palestine	7:19.16	20

==== Final C ====
Rank	Rower	Country	Time	Total rank
1	Stephen Harris	Canada	6:59.70	13
2	Mitsuo Nishimura	Japan	7:00.29	14
3	Pedro Dickson	Argentina	7:05.96	15
4	Oskar Soedal	Norway	7:09.69	16
5	Ghaith Kadri	Tunisia	7:12.58	17
6	Kasper Hirvilampi	Finland	7:15.44	18

==== Final B ====
Rank	Rower	Country	Time	Total rank
1	Ghaith Kadri	Uruguay	6:52.57	7
2	Marlon Colpaert	Belgium	6:54.28	8
3	Paul Leerkamp	Germany	6:56.14	9
4	Baptiste Savaete	France	6:57.79	10
5	Sid Ali Boudina	Algeria	6:58.16	11
6	Chiu Hin Chun	Hong Kong	7:07.31	12

==== Final A ====
Rank	Rower	Country	Time
1st place, gold medalist(s)	Paul O'Donovan	Ireland	6:49.68
2nd place, silver medalist(s)	Antonios Papakonstantinou	Greece	6:51.90
3rd place, bronze medalist(s)	Niels Torre	Italy	6:52.64
4	Samuel Melvin	United States	6:54.35
5	Julian Schöberl	Austria	7:04.62
6	Alexis López	Mexico	7:08.26
