= Ask Jarl Tjøm =

Norwegian rower (born 1996)

Ask Tjøm
Personal information
- Full name: Ask Jarl Tjøm
- Born: 2 July 1996 (age 29) Bærum, Norway

Sport
- Country: Norway
- Sport: Rowing
- Event: Men's lightweight single sculls
Medal record
Men's rowing
Representing Norway
European Championships
| Bronze medal – third place | 2024 Szeged | LM2x |

Ask Jarl Tjøm (born 2 July 1996) is a Norwegian rower. He participated in the 2024 Paris Olympics.

== Career ==
In September 2023, partnered with Lars Benske, he reached the final of the lightweight double sculls at the 2023 World Rowing Championships.

In April 2024 at the 2024 European Rowing Championships in Szeged, Hungary, Tjøm won bronze together with Lars Benske in the lightweight double sculls. The duo qualified for the Paris Olympics at the qualifying event in Lucerne in May 2024.

Competing at the 2024 Summer Olympics, they advanced through the preliminary rounds to qualify for the final.
