= Petros Gkaidatzis =

Greek rower (born 2000)

Personal information
- Born: 25 November 2000 (age 25) Thessaloniki, Greece

Sport
- Country: Greece
- Sport: Rowing
- Event: Men's lightweight single sculls
- Club: Naftikos Omilos Kalamarias Thessalonikis
Medal record
Men's rowing
Representing Greece
Olympic Games
Bronze medal – third place	2024 Paris	Lwt double sculls
World Championships
Gold medal – first place	2026 Amsterdam	Lwt double sculls
European Championships
Gold medal – first place	2026 Varese	LM1x
Bronze medal – third place	2023 Bled	LM2x
Mediterranean Games
Gold medal – first place	2026 Taranto	LM1x
Gold medal – first place	2026 Taranto	LMix2x
European U23 Championships
Gold medal – first place	2022 Heindonk	BLM1x

Petros Gkaidatzis (born 25 November 2000) is a Greek rower. He won a bronze medal at the 2024 Summer Olympics in the lightweight double sculls.

== Career ==
A member of the Greek lightweight double sculls team since 2018, he started rowing with Antonios Papakonstantinou in 2023. In May 2023 at the 2023 European Rowing Championships in Bled, Slovenia, Gkaidatzis took bronze together with Antonios Papakonstantinou in the lightweight double sculls. That month, they qualified for the Olympic Games at the qualifying tournament in Lucerne.

Competing at the 2024 Summer Olympics in Paris, the duo qualified through the preliminary rounds to reach the final. They subsequently won the bronze medal.
