= Jan Schäuble =

Swiss rower (born 1999)

Personal information
- Nationality: Swiss
- Born: 29 December 1999 (age 26)

Sport
- Sport: Rowing
- Event: Lightweight double sculls
Medal record
Men's rowing
Representing Switzerland
World Championships
Silver medal – second place	2023 Belgrade	Lwt double sculls
European Championships
Gold medal – first place	2024 Szeged	Lwt double sculls
Gold medal – first place	2023 Bled	Lwt double sculls
Bronze medal – third place	2022 Oberschleißheim	Lwt double sculls

Jan Schäuble (born 29 December 1999) is a Swiss rower. He competed at the 2024 Summer Olympics in the lightweight double sculls.

== Career ==
He won a silver medal at the 2018 European Rowing U23 Championships in Brest, Belarus.

Alongside Raphaël Ahumada, he won his first World Cup event in the lightweight double sculls in Belgrade in February 2022. They then won bronze at the 2022 European Rowing Championships in Munich.

Schäuble and Ahumada won silver in Belgrade at the 2023 World Rowing Championships in the Men's lightweight double sculls.

The pair won the gold medal at the 2023 European Rowing Championships and retained their title at the 2024 European Rowing Championships in Szeged.

They were selected to compete at the 2024 Paris Olympics.
