= Antonios Papakonstantinou =

Greek rower (born 1999)

Personal information
- Born: 18 March 1999 (age 27)

Sport
- Country: Greece
- Sport: Rowing
- Event: Men's lightweight single sculls
Medal record
Men's rowing
Representing Greece
Olympic Games
| Bronze medal – third place | 2024 Paris | Lwt double sculls |
World Championships
| Silver medal – second place | 2018 Plovdiv | LM2- |
| Silver medal – second place | 2022 Račice | LM1x |
| Silver medal – second place | 2024 St. Catharines | LM1x |
European Championships
| Gold medal – first place | 2022 Munich | LM1x |
| Bronze medal – third place | 2023 Bled | LM2x |
World U23 Championships
| Gold medal – first place | 2021 Racice | LM1x |
| Silver medal – second place | 2018 Poznan | LM2- |
European U23 Championships
| Gold medal – first place | 2018 Brest | LM2- |
| Gold medal – first place | 2019 Ioannina | LM2x |
| Bronze medal – third place | 2020 Duisburg | LM1x |

Antonios Papakonstantinou (Greek: Αντώνης Παπακωνσταντίνου; born 18 March 1999) is a Greek rower. He won a gold medal in the lightweight single sculls at the 2022 European Rowing Championships.

A member of the Greek lightweight double sculls team since 2018, he started rowing with Petros Gkaidatzis in 2023. In May 2023 at the 2023 European Rowing Championships in Bled, Slovenia, Papakonstantinou took bronze together with Petros Gkaidatzis in the lightweight double sculls. That month, they qualified for the Olympic Games at the qualifying tournament in Lucerne.

Competing at the 2024 Summer Olympics in Paris, the duo qualified through the preliminary rounds to reach the final. They subsequently won the bronze medal.
