= Lars Benske =

Norwegian rower (born 1999)

Personal information
- Full name: Lars Martin Benske
- Born: 17 September 1999 (age 26)

Sport
- Country: Norway
- Sport: Rowing
- Event: Men's lightweight single sculls
Medal record
Men's rowing
Representing Norway
European Championships
Bronze medal – third place	2024 Szeged	LM2x

Lars Martin Benske (born 17 September 1999) is a Norwegian rower. He participated in the 2024 Paris Olympics.

== Career ==
In September 2023, partnered with Ask Tjøm, he reached the final of the lightweight double sculls at the 2023 World Rowing Championships.

In April 2024 at the 2024 European Rowing Championships in Szeged, Hungary, he won bronze together with Ask Tjøm in the lightweight double sculls. The duo qualified for the Paris Olympics at the qualifying event in Lucerne in May 2024.

Competing at the 2024 Summer Olympics, they advanced through the preliminary rounds to qualify for the final.
