= Caetano Horta =

Spanish rower (born 2003)

Personal information
- Full name: Caetano Horta Pombo
- Nationality: Spain
- Born: 15 January 2003 (age 23) Noia, Spain
- Height: 1.75 m (5 ft 9 in)

Sport
- Sport: Rowing
Medal record
Men's rowing
Representing Spain
European Championships
Silver medal – second place	2026 Varese	M2x
World U23 Championships
Gold medal – first place	2024 St. Catharines	BLM1x

Caetano Horta Pombo (born 15 January 2003) is a Spanish rower. He competed in the 2020 Summer Olympics in Tokyo and the 2024 Summer Olympics in Paris. In August 2024, he won the Lightweight U23 Men's Single Sculls at the 2024 World Rowing Championships.
