= Irish Americans in the American Civil War =

Irish-American Roman Catholics served on both sides of the American Civil War (1861–1865) as officers, volunteers and draftees. Immigration due to the Irish Great Famine (1845–1852) had provided many thousands of men as potential recruits although issues of race, religion, pacifism and personal allegiance created some resistance to service. A significant body of these veterans later used the military experience gained in the war to launch several conflicts (most notably the Fenian Rising in British Ireland and the Fenian Raids in Canada) with the goal of establishing an independent Irish Republic as members of the Irish Republican Brotherhood, the Fenian Brotherhood and Clan na Gael.

== Pre-1861 Irish immigration ==
Irish immigration to the United States has taken place since colonial times (such as John Barry of the U.S. Navy, while Andrew Jackson was partially Scots-Irish). Six Declaration of Independence signers were of Irish and Ulster Scot descent, with one signee, Charles Carroll of Carrollton, being the only Catholic signer. However, various social conditions in Ireland (such as poverty and harsh landlords) along with the Great Irish Famine—caused many Catholic Irish to emigrate in the mid-19th century.

An Irish immigrant, having suffered through an arduous overseas journey, would have been thrust into a difficult and unfamiliar situation, as many were poor and unused to American customs.

Soon, however, the number of Irish-Americans in some cities grew so great that immigrant Patrick Murphy stated "New York is a grand handsome city. But you would hardly know you had left Ireland." American customs, once utterly foreign to the immigrants, became blended with traditional ones, forming a distinct Irish-American culture.

== The American Civil War ==
Most Irish-Americans were settled in the northern American states and were thus called up to serve in the union army by the time the southern states seceded and formed the Confederacy in 1861. Many Irish-Americans formed their own units which embraced Irish customs, such as Catholic Masses and priests.

=== The 1863 draft riots ===
On March 3, 1863, Congress passed the Enrollment Act which required single male US citizens (and male aliens who had applied for US citizenship) aged 20 to 45, and married men up to age 35 to register for the draft. This act angered many northern whites, mainly Irish immigrants who had accepted U.S. citizenship, not realizing that citizenship also made immigrants liable for the draft. Fuel was added to the fire of their anger when black men, mostly freed slaves, were excluded from this same draft. The Irish feared that newly freed slaves from the South would migrate to the North and create further competition in the labor market. Many Irish saw this as a "rich man's war and a poor man's fight" since the policies of substitution and commutation were controversial practices which allowed drafted citizens to opt out of service by either furnishing a suitable substitute to take the place of those drafted, or pay $300 each. Both of these provisions were created with the intention of softening the effect of the draft on pacifiers, the anti-draft movement and the propertied classes. The result however was general public resentment which then turned to fury.

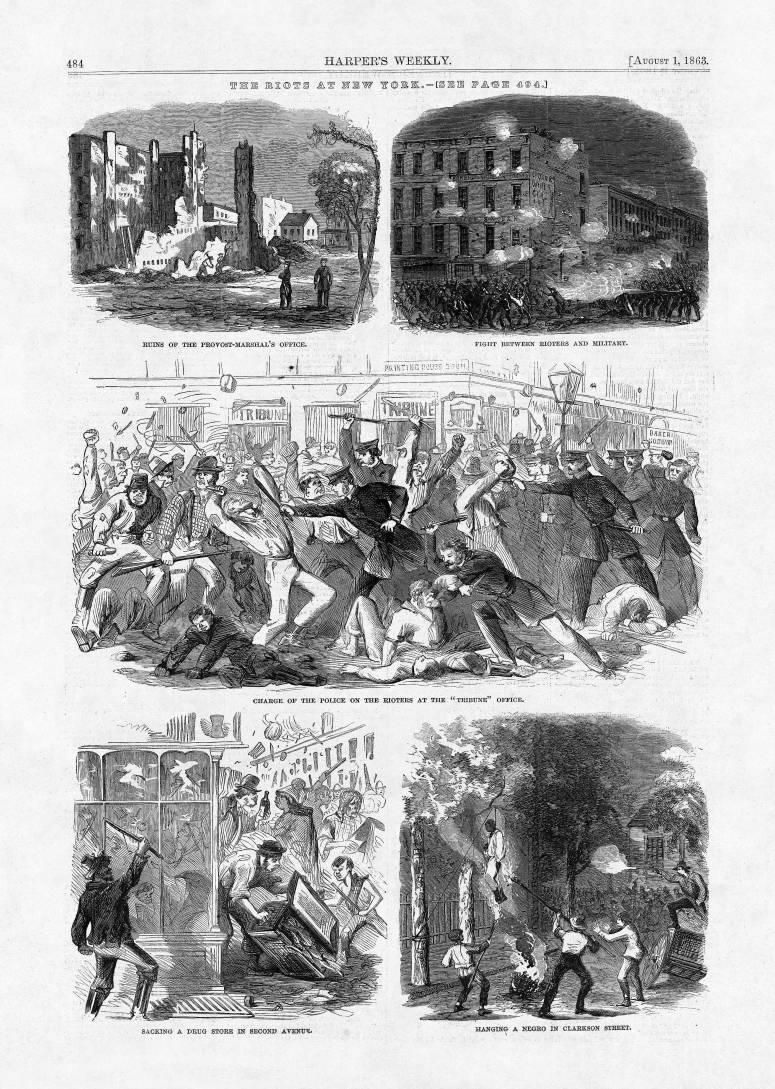
The Riots at New York, Harpers Weekly, August 1, 1863

A few days after the Enrollment Act was passed, on March 6, 1863, the Detroit Race Riot of 1863 erupted in Detroit, Michigan, as Irish rioted for days over the draft. Four months later, on July 13–16, as the first draft being held in New York City, the mostly Irish working class of the city started the 1863 New York City draft riots. Stores were looted and offices of newspapers which supported the Union were ransacked and burned to the ground. When the riots started, the New York State Militia were absent because they had been sent to assist regular Union troops repelling General Lee's Confederate Army in Pennsylvania, thus leaving the New York City Police Department as the only serious force available to put down the riot.

The city police were unable to halt a crowd which was ten times more numerous, and the rioting continued. Two days after the riot started, word came that the draft had been suspended. Federal troops returning from the Battle of Gettysburg were sent to the city to quell the riot and peace was finally restored in the streets of New York City more than a day later. An estimated 120 people are thought to have died in the draft riots in New York City, which makes this the most deadly civil insurrection in American history.

=== Irish service to the Union ===
Green Ensign of the 1st Regiment (69th N. Y. Volunteer Infantry), Irish Brigade, Union Army

The Northern states remained loyal to the United States government, which was led by President Abraham Lincoln. Seven Union generals were Irish-born while an estimated 150,000 Irish-Americans fought for the Union during the war.

The Irish involvement in the war was prevalent from its very beginning, as the two first recorded combat deaths (suffered at Fort Sumter in April 1861) were Irish born. Danial Hough and Edward Galloway (born in Tipperary and Cork respectively) were mortally wounded in the unfortunate explosion of one of the forts 100 guns magazines, that were set to end the siege and mark the Unions withdrawal with a 100 gun salute (a salute which was cut to 50 as a result of the accident). Hough died soon after and was buried in the parade ground, whilst Galloway died five days later.

Irish-Americans living in the Union states often formed their own regiments, notably the 69th New York State Volunteers and 90th Illinois Infantry Regiment. The 69th New York Volunteers flew a green flag with a golden harp on it, symbolizing Ireland. The green flag was carried in addition to the normal regimental and national colours, making the 69th probably the only regiment to carry five colors into battle during the American Civil War.

After the First Battle of Bull Run, the 69th New York Infantry was incorporated into a larger unit, the Irish Brigade. At the 1862 Battle of Fredericksburg, the brigade charged up Marye's Heights, suffering 41.4% casualties. During the Battle of Gettysburg in 1863, the Irish Brigade held a Catholic mass before facing Pickett's Charge.

The Irish Brigade was the subject of the original version of a song, "Kelly's Irish Brigade", after its commander, Patrick Kelly. This has caused a dispute, with those who attribute the song to a known Confederate song of the same name (even sung to the same tune) though both are seen as of the time.

Though the most prevalent and recognised of the 'Irish regiments', several other notable regiments that were largely composed of Irish immigrants also distinguished themselves in the field. For example, the 9th Massachusetts Volunteer Infantry Regiment (attached to the 5th Corp.) formed largely of Irish immigrants from the Boston area suffered the loss of 15 officers and 194 enlisted men in combat (as well as 3 officers and 66 enlisted men to disease) throughout the war and were central to many of its bloodiest battles. Initially led by charismatic Colonel Thomas Cass (himself an Irishman, born in County Laois), who died in 1862 after receiving wounds at the Battle of Malvern Hill, notable engagements included Mechanicsville, Gaines's Mill, Malvern Hill, Second Bull Run and Antietam. As well as notable involvements in a successful (yet possibly initially overlooked) holding action at Big Round Top during the Battle of Gettysburg, the regiment was also held supporting roles in the disasters of Fredericksburg and Chancellorsville. The 28th Massachusetts also formed a largely Irish regiment during the war, it, however, fought below a green flag bearing the golden harp (similarly to the 69th New York).

Even at the war's end, the Irish presence was felt during the tragedy of Lincoln's assassination, as the man who organised the initial manhunt for John Wilkes Booth and his conspirators (and would ultimately spearhead the capture of them all) James O'Beirne (born in County Roscommon) a Captain in the 37th New York Infantry, who had been seriously wounded in the lung at Chancellorsville, organised a huge countrywide hunt, and although not present for the final capture of Booth (an honour taken by Lafayette Baker) his role was noted by then secretary for war Edward M. Stanton.

Initial enthusiasm to fight for the union was lessened by both spiraling casualties, the seemingly never-ending war, and crucially, the alignment between the war and the abolition of slavery, which produced large amounts of anger in Irish communities, due to a fear that freed slaves would take the jobs often held by poor immigrants in the North (particularly seen in the draft riots of 1863).

=== Irish-Americans in Confederate service ===
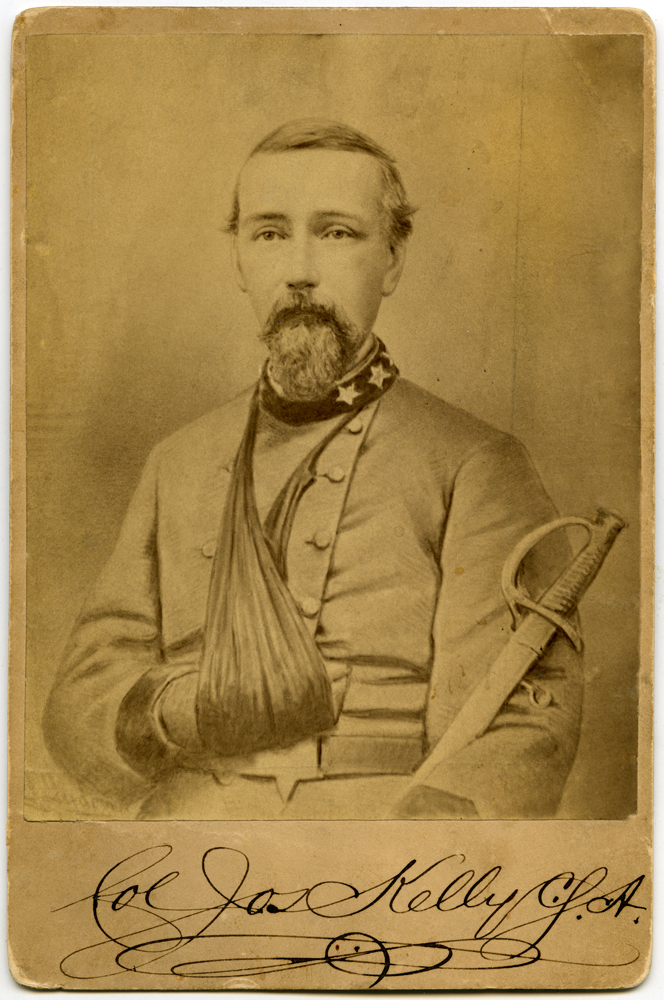
Col. Joseph Kelly, C.S.A.

Although significantly fewer Irish lived in the Confederate States of America, six Confederate generals were Irish-born, of whom Patrick Cleburne was the highest ranking. Units such as the Charleston Irish Volunteers attracted Confederate Irish-Americans in South Carolina, the 24th Georgia Volunteer Infantry followed General Thomas Reade Rootes Cobb, while Irish Tennesseans could join the 10th Tennessee Infantry Regiment. A company of the Washington Blues regiment of the Missouri Volunteer Militia (later the Missouri State Guard), commanded by Colonel Joseph Kelly, was the subject of a Confederate song, "Kelly's Irish Brigade". The Louisiana Tigers, first raised by Major Chatham Roberdeau Wheat, had a large number of Irish American members.

Company E, Emerald Guard, 33rd Virginia Infantry of the Stonewall Brigade composed of Irish immigrant volunteers may have been first to make the infamous "Rebel Yell" at 1st Bull Run, attacking 14th New York guns on Henry Hill. The Davis Guard, a company of mostly Irish-American men from the Houston and Galveston area, won a lopsided victory Second Battle of Sabine Pass in 1863. They received the only physical medals awarded by the CSA, made from polished Mexican silver coins and hung from green ribbons to honor their Irish heritage.

In "The Irish at the Front," Michael MacDonagh notes that when an "uproarious" regiment of Irish soldiers in World War I (the 2nd Dublin Fusiliers, camped at Cambrai) broke into a chorus of Dear Old Ireland:

"It was not the first time that the song was heard on a field of battle. On that night in December, 1863, in the American Civil War, when the Federals and Confederates were bivouacked on the banks of the Rappahannock awaiting the dawn to commence the bloody fight for Fredericksburg, an Irish regiment in the service of the North sang the song as they sat by their camp fires. Was that a tremendous echo that can across the river? -- [...]

The Irishmen of the North listened intently. Then it came upon them with wild surprise that the chorus had been taken up by an Irish regiment in the service of the South!"

== See also ==
- John B. Bannon
- Irish Brigade (U.S.)
- 1st Virginia Infantry Battalion C.S.
- 69th Infantry Regiment U.S., "The fighting Irish"
- Irish military diaspora
- List of Americans of Irish descent
- African Americans in the American Civil War
- German Americans in the American Civil War
- Hispanics in the American Civil War
- Italian Americans in the Civil War
- Native Americans in the American Civil War
- Foreign enlistment in the American Civil War
