= The Southern Star (County Cork) =

Local newspaper in Ireland

- Type: Weekly newspaper
- Format: Broadsheet
- Owner(s): Florence O'Sullivan; John O'Sullivan
- Founded: 1889
- Headquarters: Skibbereen, County Cork
- Website: southernstar.ie

The Southern Star is a weekly regional newspaper based in Skibbereen, County Cork in Ireland and was established in 1889 as the Cork County Southern Star, by brothers Florence and John O'Sullivan.

One of its rival newspapers in the 19th century was The Skibbereen Eagle, founded in 1857. It had become "famous by declaring it was 'keeping an eye on the Czar of Russia' over his expansionist designs on China". On the centenary of the event, Brendan McWilliams gave a slightly different account in The Irish Times, saying that on 5 September 1898 The Skibbereen Eagle's editorial stated "We will still keep our eye on the Emperor of Russia and on all such despotic enemies, whether at home or abroad, of human progression and man's natural rights.".

The Skibbereen Eagle eventually folded and, in 1929, was bought out by The Southern Star.

From April 1918 to June 1948 the paper was published as Réalt a' Deiscirt, the Irish translation of Southern Star. Between July 1948 and December 1986, its masthead featured both titles, with "Réalt a' Deiscirt" above "The Southern Star" until 1962 and the English title above the Irish thereafter. From January 1987 the respective font sizes of the two titles varied and in September 2010 the Irish version was removed.

One of the early editors of The Southern Star was D. D. Sheehan, and the paper included amongst its shareholders Michael Collins.

The Southern Star is the largest selling newspaper in Cork county, employing about 30 people and has a weekly readership of over 50,000. It is privately owned by the O'Regan family, who reside in Skibbereen. Liam O'Regan edited the paper from 1958 until his death in January 2009.
