= Fort Sumter Flag =

American flag important in the Civil War

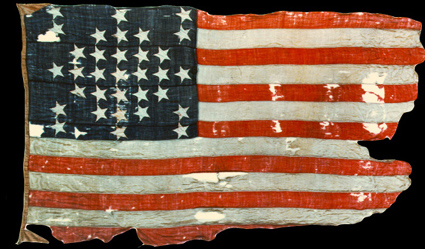
Storm Flag raised at Fort Sumter

Digital reproduction of the Fort Sumter Flag

The Fort Sumter Flag is a historic United States flag with a distinctive, diamond-shaped pattern of 33 stars. When the main flagpole was felled by a shot during the bombardment of Fort Sumter by Confederate forces, Peter Hart rushed to retrieve the flag and remount it on a makeshift pole. The flag was lowered by Major Robert Anderson on April 13, 1861, when he surrendered Fort Sumter, in the harbor of Charleston, South Carolina, at the outset of the American Civil War.

Anderson brought the flag to New York City for an April 20, 1861, patriotic rally, where it was flown from the equestrian statue of George Washington in Union Square. More than 100,000 people thronged Manhattan's Union Square in what was, by some accounts, the largest public gathering in the country up to that time. The flag was then taken from town to town, city to city throughout the North, where it was frequently "auctioned" to raise funds for the war effort. Any patriotic citizen who won the flag at auction was expected to immediately donate it back to the nation, and it would promptly be taken to the next rally to repeat its fundraising magic. The flag was a widely known patriotic symbol for the North during the war.

On April 14, 1865, four years and one day after the surrender and as part of a celebration of the Union victory, Anderson (by then a retired and sickly major general), raised the flag in triumph over the battered remains of the fort. Author Shelby Foote quotes Anderson as saying, "I thank God that I have lived to see this day," as he took the flagpole's halyards in his hands.

The Rev. Henry Ward Beecher was the principal orator at the 1865 celebration, and gave a lengthy speech, as was the custom of the day. He said in conclusion:

"On this solemn and joyful day, we again lift to the breeze our fathers’ flag, now, again, the banner of the United States, with the fervent prayer that God would crown it with honor, protect it from treason, and send it down to our children.... Terrible in battle, may it be beneficent in peace [and] as long as the sun endures, or the stars, may it wave over a nation neither enslaved nor enslaving.... We lift up our banner, and dedicate it to peace, Union, and liberty, now and forevermore."

— Rev. Henry Ward Beecher

Later that night President Lincoln would be shot at Ford's Theatre.

According to an 1892 article by Edward David in The Evening Star (Washington, D.C.), the United States garrison at Fort Sumter had both a garrison flag and a storm flag. David wrote, "The garrison flag that floated over Sumter during the bombardment is in tatters so far as the stripes are concerned, but not a star in its union was touched. The storm flag is in a better state of preservation than is the garrison flag." They were both in the possession of Eliza B. Anderson, the widow of Robert Anderson, and she allowed David to sketch them for his article. Four years later, she sent him a fragment of the garrison flag. After her death in 1905, her daughters fulfilled a direction in her will that the Sumter flags "be given back to the country, their proper custodian, when I am no more" when they presented them to then Secretary of War William Howard Taft.

On September 19, 2023, the Fort Sumter Storm Flag was removed from public display indefinitely for conservation by the National Park Service museum at the fort. Commercial replicas of the flag are widely available.
