= Skibbereen Town Hall =

Municipal building in Skibbereen, County Cork, Ireland

- Halla an Bhaile An Sciobairín
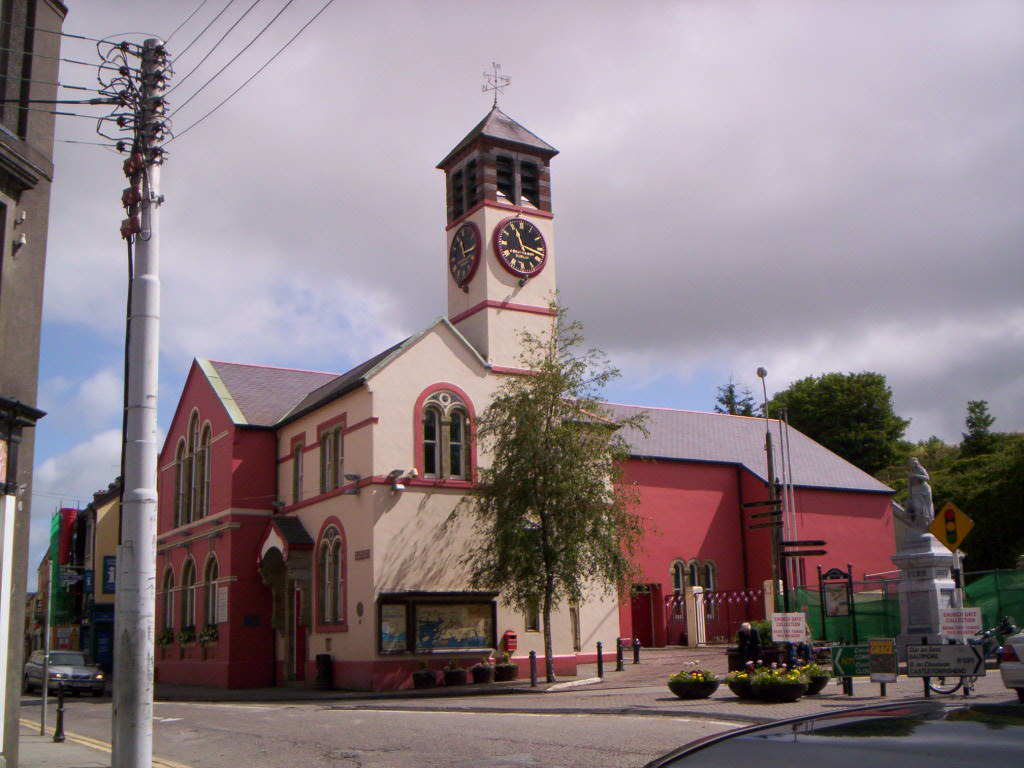
- Skibbereen Town Hall

- Location within County Cork

General information
- Architectural style: Victorian style
- Location: The Square, Skibbereen, Ireland
- Coordinates: 51.5494°N 9.2658°W
- Completed: c.1862

Skibbereen Town Hall (Irish: Halla an Bhaile An Sciobairín) is a municipal building in The Square at Skibbereen, County Cork, Ireland. It is currently used as a community events venue, hosting concerts and theatre performances.

== History ==
The building was commissioned by the local landowner Sir Henry Wrixon-Becher, 2nd Baronet, whose seat was at Castlehyde. The site he selected, on the north side of The Square, was occupied by an old market hall and toll house which was in a dilapidated condition.

The new building was designed in the Victorian style, built in rubble masonry and was completed in around 1862. The design involved an asymmetrical main frontage of five bays facing onto North Street. The left-hand section of three bays, which was slightly projected forward and gabled, featured three round headed openings with voussoirs and keystones on the ground floor and a Venetian window on the first floor. The fourth bay from the left featured a round headed doorway with pilasters, imposts, voussoirs and an ornate triangular canopy on the ground floor, and a segmental headed window on the first floor, while the right-hand bay was fenestrated by a bi-partite mullioned window on the ground floor and by a pair of segmental headed windows on the first floor. Internally, the principal rooms were a market hall on the ground floor and an assembly room on the first floor.

After Wrixon-Becher reluctantly abandoned some restrictions on political use that he had sought to impose, the town commissioners purchased the building in 1866. In the early-1870s, a four-stage clock tower was erected behind the right-hand bay: there was a lancet window in the first stage, a round headed window in the second stage, clock faces in the third stage and louvres in the fourth stage, all surmounted by a pyramid-shaped roof and a weather vane. The clock was donated by Henry Winthrop O'Donovan of Liss Ard House.

The building became an important venue for public events: speakers included the Irish nationalist Charles Stewart Parnell in April 1880, the Irish republican, Michael Davitt, in August 1887, and the suffragette, Maud Gonne, in March 1902. After the town commissioners were replaced by an urban district council in 1899, the new council adopted the building as its meeting place. A statue commemorating local people who had died in one of the republican uprisings, sculpted by John Maguire and entitled the "Maid of Erin", was erected just to the south of the town hall and unveiled by Jeremiah O'Donovan Rossa in 1904.

The actor and future playwright Harold Pinter performed on stage in September 1951, and the McMaster Intimate Theatre Company, led by Anew McMaster, put on a performance of the Greek tragedy Oedipus Rex there in August 1955. It was after one of McMaster's performances, in August 1955, that the town hall was almost completely gutted in a serious fire. It was restored and re-opened by Bishop Cornelius Lucey on 2 February 1960. A plaque intended to commemorate the life of the locally-born politician Gearóid O'Sullivan, who raised the Irish Flag over the General Post Office in Dublin during the Easter Rising, was installed on the front of the town hall to commemorate the fiftieth anniversary of the Easter Rising in 1966.

The town hall continued to serve as the local seat of government until the urban district council moved to new offices above the library at the former Bishop Kelly Memorial Technical School further north along North Street in April 1992. However, the building subsequently continued to be used as a community events venue, hosting concerts and theatre performances. A new glass-fronted entrance foyer, intended to improve access, was erected by local contractors, Cahalane Brothers, on the south side of the town hall in autumn 2023.
