= Skibbereen =

Town in County Cork, Ireland

Skibbereen Irish: An Sciobairín
- Town
- Aerial view of the town

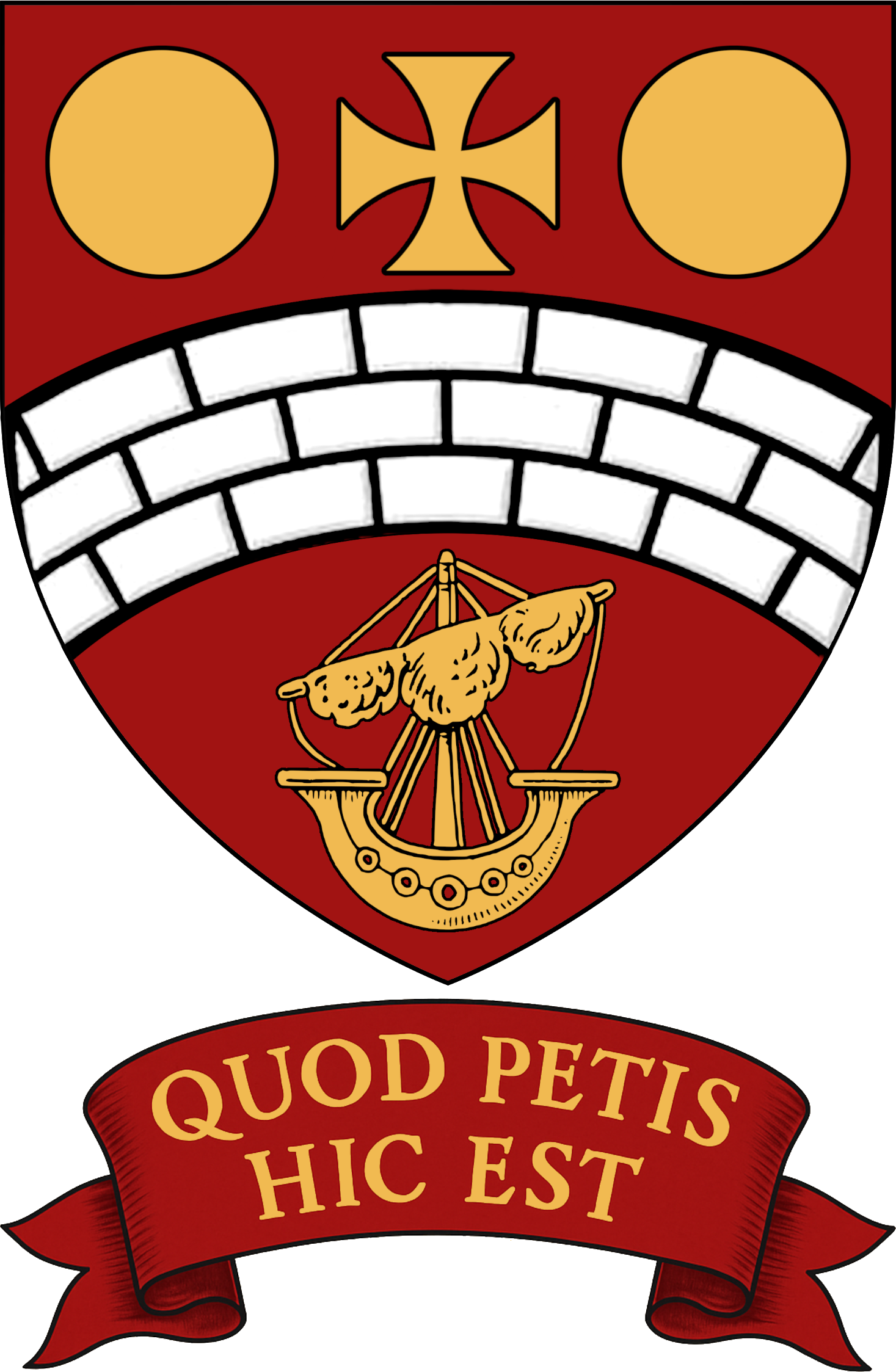
- Coat of arms
- Motto: Quod petis hic est
- Location in Ireland
- Coordinates: 51°32′57″N 9°16′03″W
- Country: Ireland
- Province: Munster
- County: County Cork

Population (2022)
  - Total: 2,903
- Time zone: UTC±0 (WET)
  - Summer (DST): UTC+1 (IST)
- Eircode routing key: P81
- Telephone area code: +353(0)28
- Irish Grid Reference: W119334
- Website: www.skibbereen.ie

Skibbereen (/ˌskɪbəˈriːn/; Irish: An Sciobairín) is a town in County Cork, Ireland. It is located in West Cork on the N71 national secondary road. The River Ilen runs through the town; it reaches the sea about 12 kilometres away, at the seaside village of Baltimore. Located in a tourist area, Tragumna beach is nearby.

The town of Skibbereen, sometimes shortened to "Skibb", is in the Cork South-West Dáil constituency, which has three seats. As of the 2022 census, the population of the town was 2,903.

== Toponymy ==
Skibbereen is located on the River Ilen. In his book The Origin and History of Irish Names of Places (1869), the historian Patrick Weston Joyce suggests that the Irish place name Sciobairín or Scibirín derives from the small boats or skiffs (scibs) that were common on this stretch of the river.

== History ==
Prior to 1600, most of the land in the area belonged to the native MacCarthy Reagh dynasty. The town charter dates back to 1657 and a copy can be seen in the town council chambers. In 1631, Skibbereen received an influx of refugees fleeing from the Sack of Baltimore. The "Phoenix Society" was founded in Skibbereen in 1856 and was a precursor to the Fenian movement.

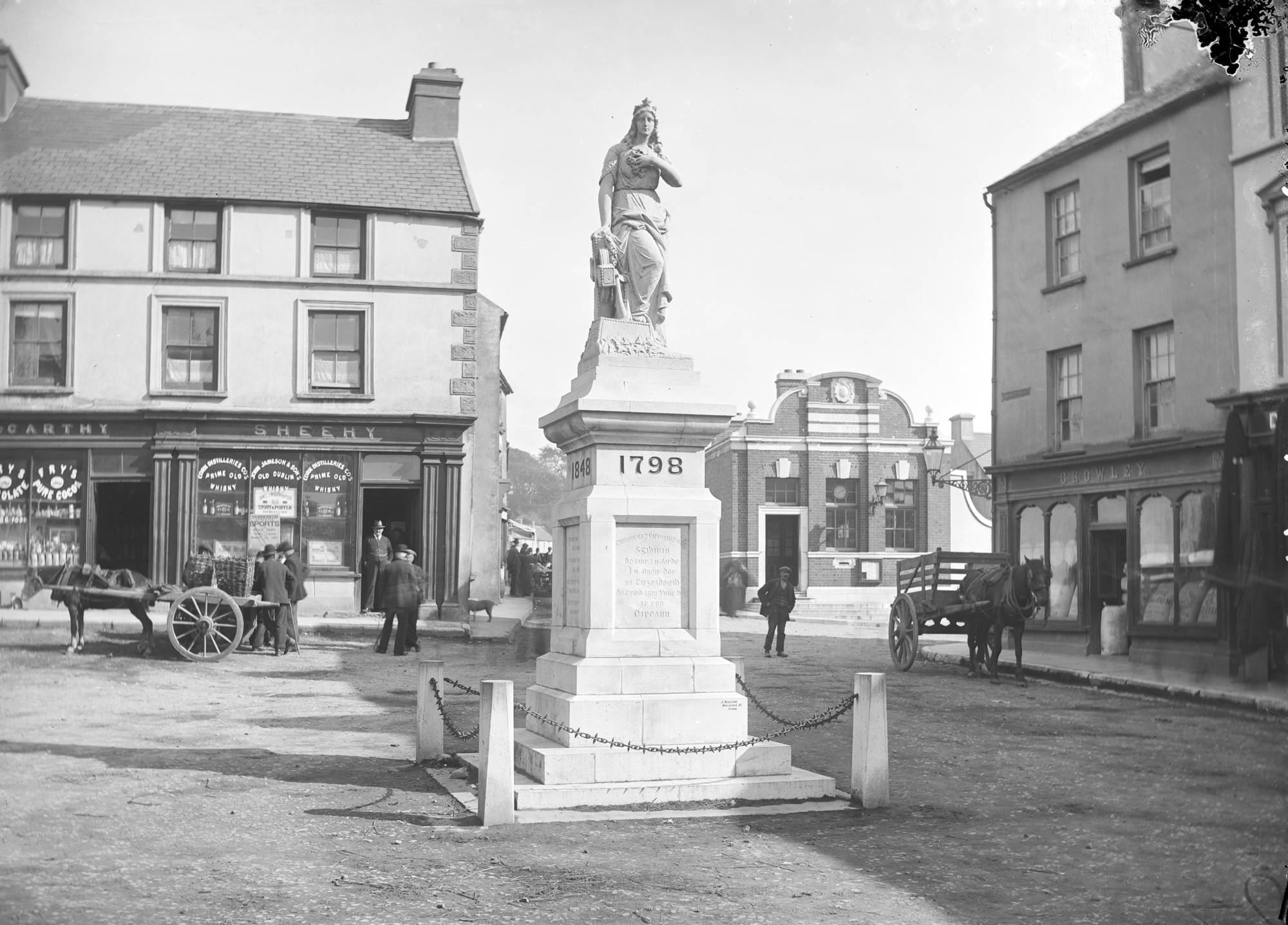
The "Maid of Erin", c. 1904

A statue, the 'Maid of Erin' erected in 1904, sits on top of a memorial to commemorate four failed uprisings against British rule, the dates of which are engraved on each side of the plinth: 1798, 1803, 1848, 1867.

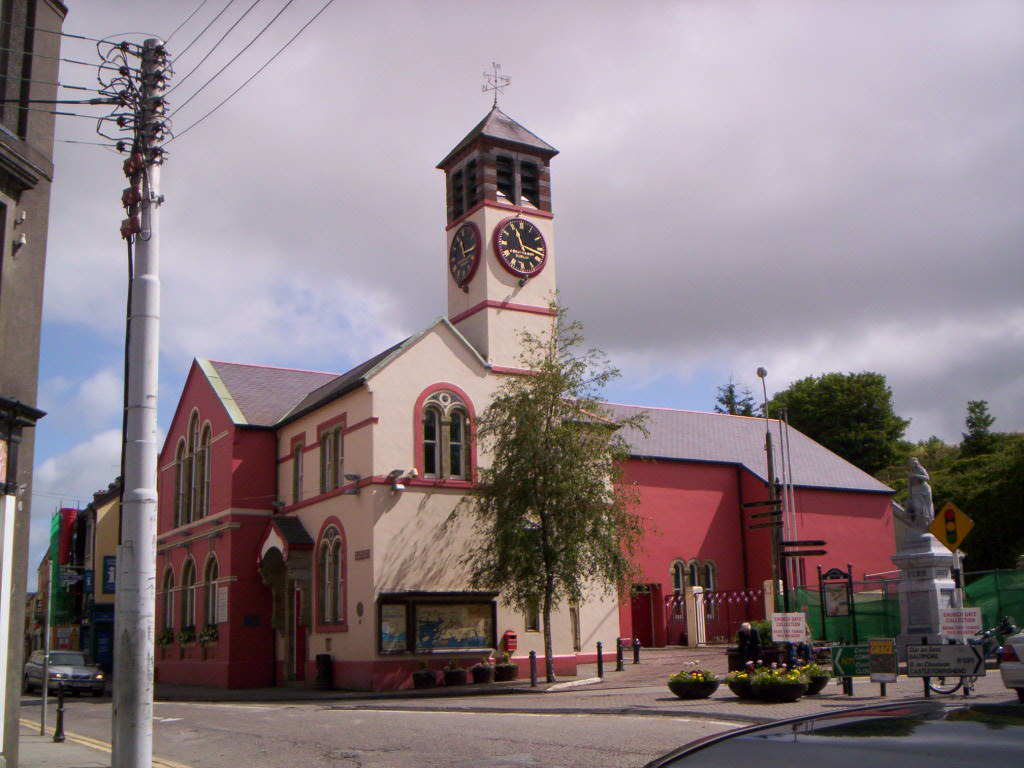
Skibbereen Town Hall

Skibbereen was once a stop on the West Cork Railway, which scheduled trains from West Cork to Cork City. The construction of the railways took place between 1851 and 1893 and by 1961, all West Cork railway lines were closed. Skibbereen also had a separate terminus station on the narrow-gauge Schull and Skibbereen Tramway and Light Railway. Skibbereen Town Hall was erected in around 1862.

=== Famine ===
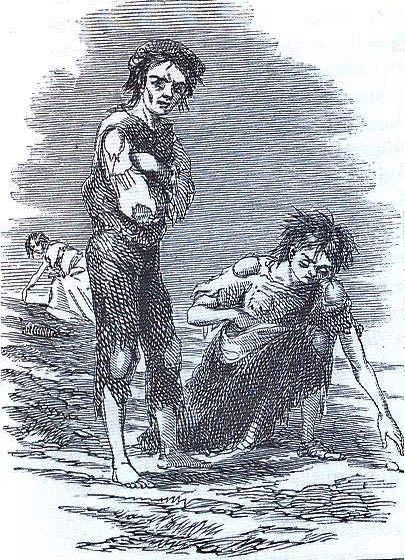
Skibbereen 1847; a sketch by Cork artist James Mahony (1810–1879) commissioned for Illustrated London News 20 February 1847

The region around Skibbereen experienced a significant famine in the years 1845–52, a time referred to as The Great Hunger or Great Famine (Irish: an Gorta Mór). The Skibbereen Heritage Centre estimates that 8,000 to 10,000 victims of the Famine are buried in the famine burial pits of Abbeystrewery cemetery close to the town. While there is some question on the accuracy of census data from the famine era, records indicate a drop of population from 58,335 in 1841 to 32,412 in 1861.

During the famine, Skibbereen was used as a centre of organisation by the local relief committee who played a role in coordinating voluntary relief efforts and providing a model for soup kitchens and to develop emigration schemes.

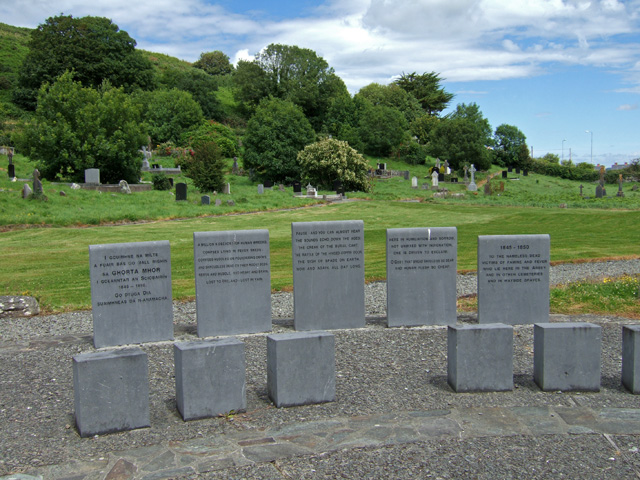
Site of Famine Burial Pits at Abbeystrowery

Skibbereen is also the name of a song about the Famine, and the impact it and the British Government had on the people of Ireland. The song, also known as Dear Old Skibbereen, takes the form of a conversation between a father and a son, in which the son asks his father why he fled the land he loved so well.

A permanent exhibition to commemorate the memory of the victims of the Great Famine is sited at the Skibbereen Heritage Centre. Skibbereen was also the focal point of Ireland's first National Famine Memorial Day on 17 May 2009. The town was selected as it was in one of the areas worst affected by the Great Famine. The National Famine Commemoration Committee agreed that the centrepiece of the memorial day would rotate between the Four Provinces on an annual basis.

== Media ==
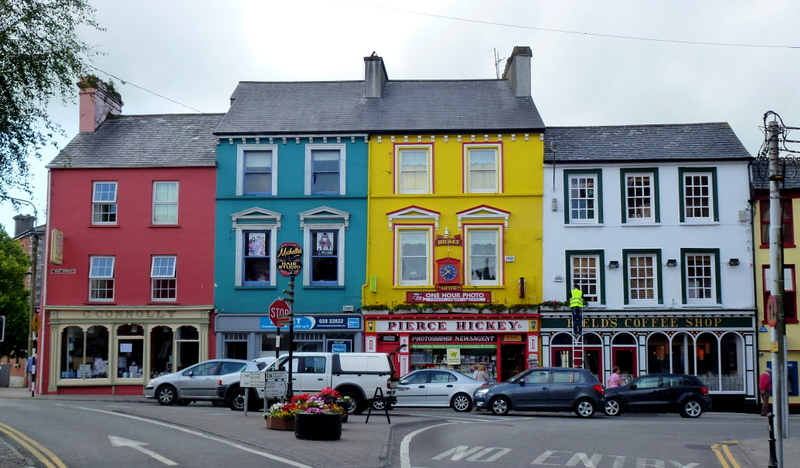
High Street, Skibbereen

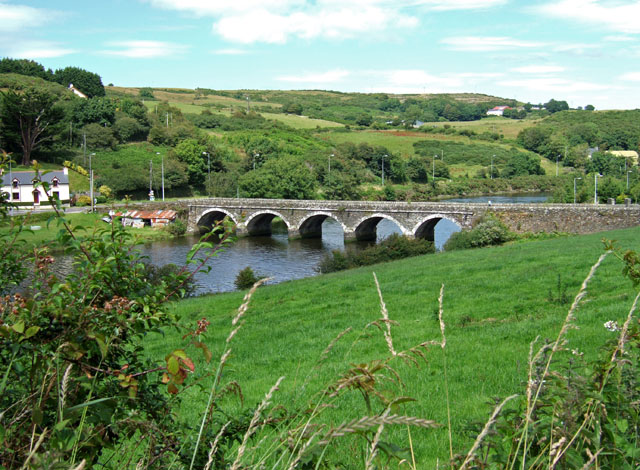
New Bridge over the River Ilen

The Skibbereen Eagle, a newspaper founded in 1857, published both local and international stories. For example, it published an editorial that "told Lord Palmerston that it had 'got its eye both upon him and on the Emperor of Russia'." And a 1914 article said "We give this solemn warning to Kaiser Wilhelm: The Skibbereen Eagle has its eye on you." This newspaper was superseded by the Southern Star, which was founded in Skibbereen in 1889.

== Sport ==
O'Donovan Rossa GAA is the local Gaelic Athletic Association club. The local secondary school St. Fachtna's was a finalist in 1982 and a winner in 1991 of the Hogan Cup for Gaelic football.

Skibbereen Rowing Club is situated on the outskirts of the town, and is one of the most successful clubs in Ireland. Club members Paul and Gary O'Donovan won silver at the 2016 summer Olympics in the men's lightweight double sculls, the first Olympic medal won by Irish rowers. Paul O'Donovan and fellow club member Fintan McCarthy also won gold at both the 2020 Olympics in Tokyo and the 2024 Olympics in Paris.

A.F.C.Skibbereen is the local association football (soccer) club, with other sports clubs including Skibbereen Golf Club, Skibbereen Rugby Club, and Skibbereen Athletics Club.

== Education ==
There are four primary schools located in the town, including Abbeystrewry National School (a mixed school), Gaelscoil Dr. Uí Shúilleabháin (a mixed Irish-speaking school), St. Patrick's Primary School (boys), and Scoil Naomh Seosamh (girls)

The town's previous three secondary schools (Rossa College, St Fachtna's De la Salle and Mercy Heights) were amalgamated into a new school, called Skibbereen Community School, which opened in September 2016.

== Demographics ==
As of the 2011 census, there were 2,670 people living in Skibbereen. In terms of religion, the 2011 census recorded this population as being 79% Catholic, 11.5% other stated religion, 7% with no religion, and 1.5% not stated.

By the 2016 census the population was 2,778. In 2016, the Skibbereen Urban and Skibbereen Rural electoral divisions were 75.6% white Irish, 18.8% other white ethnicities, 0.6% black, 1.2% Asian, 1% of other ethnicity, and 2.9% with no stated ethnicity. As of 2016, 5.4% of Skibbereen's urban population identified with a UK nationality, compared to an average of 2.6% for the county as a whole.

As of the 2022 census, Skibbereen had a population of 2,903. The population consisted of 64.1% White Irish, 21.8% other White ethnicities, 0.6% Black or Black Irish, 3.6% Asian or Asian Irish, 1.7% of other ethnicities, 1.2% Irish Traveller, and 7.1% with no stated ethnicity.

== Culture ==
Festivals held in Skibbereen include the annual Skibbereen Arts Festival. This typically takes place at the end of July and includes community-based projects as well film screenings, theatre, visual art and music acts.

An agricultural festival, the Carbery Show, also takes place in July. This show includes agricultural, horticultural, livestock, craft, bakery and other competitions, as well as a pet show, and trade exhibition. The first Carbery Show took place in 1836.

Music events are also held locally, with several bars and venues in town hosting musical acts. Skibbereen has also hosted the Cork X Southwest Music & Arts Festival over several years. The 2011 festival was held at Liss Ard Estate and featured Patti Smith, Echo & the Bunnymen, Balkan Beat Box, Fred and others across a two-day lineup.

== Amenities ==
Medical facilities in the town include Skibbereen Community Hospital and Skibbereen Medical Centre.

== Notable people ==
- Marian Barry, trade unionist
- Agnes Mary Clerke, astronomer and writer born in Skibbereen
- Ambrose Coghill, actor and aristocrat
- Gavin Coombes, Irish rugby union player
- Minnie Cormack (1862–1919), Irish-British painter and engraver
- Bob Crowley, theatre designer who has a house near Skibbereen
- Seamus Davis, physicist and member of the U.S. National Academy of Sciences grew up in Skibbereen
- Tony Davis, former Gaelic footballer and television analyst for RTÉ's The Sunday Game programme
- Edward Galloway (1840–1861) first soldier in the American Civil War to be mortally wounded.
- Canon James Goodman, clergyman and collector of Irish folk music
- Jeremy Irons, English actor who maintains a fishing cottage in Skibbereen
- Percy Ludgate, designer of an analytical engine, born in Skibbereen
- Fintan McCarthy, Olympic gold medallist (rowing – lightweight double sculls, 2020 and 2024)
- Edmund Meade-Waldo (1855–1934), ornithologist and conservationist, born near Skibbereen
- Kieron Moore, actor
- Gary O'Donovan, Olympic silver medallist (rowing – lightweight double sculls, 2016)
- Paul O'Donovan, Olympic gold medallist (rowing – lightweight double sculls, 2020 and 2024)
- Jeremiah O'Donovan Rossa, Fenian leader who worked in Skibbereen
- David Puttnam, English film producer
- Jasper Wolfe, Teachta Dála and solicitor
- Don Wycherley, actor

== See also ==
- List of towns and villages in Ireland
