= Cork X Southwest Music & Arts Festival =

Festival in West Cork, Ireland

Cork X Southwest Music & Arts Festival was an annual festival in Skibbereen, West Cork, Ireland.

2011 saw the festival in its fourth year. The festival took place on Liss Ard Estate in Skibbereen, West Cork on Saturday 4 June and Sunday 5 June.

== 2011 ==
The fourth annual Cork x Southwest music festival took place on 4 June 2011.

The artists performing at the 2011 Cork X SW Music Festival include:

- Echo & The Bunnymen
- Patti Smith
- Peter Hook & The Light
- Balkan Beat Box
- Spider John Koerner
- Mick Flannery
- Fred
- Favourite Sons
- Jape
- Interference

== 2010 ==
The third annual Cork x Southwest music festival took place on Saturday 31 July 2010.

The artists performing included:

- Martha Wainwright
- Bonnie Prince Billy
- Hothouse Flowers
- The Frank and Walters
- Mick Flannery
- John Spillane
- Luka Bloom

== Sponsorship ==
The main sponsor for the Cork x Southwest music festival was Murphy's Irish Stout.
