= Daniel Hough =

Irish-born American soldier (1825–1861)

- Born: 1825; Borrisokane, County Tipperary, Ireland
- Died: April 14, 1861 (aged 35–36); Fort Sumter, South Carolina
- Burial place: Unknown
- Military career
- Allegiance: United States
- Branch: United States Army
- Service years: 1859–1861
- Rank: Private
- Unit: 1st United States Artillery Regiment
- Conflicts: American Civil War: Battle of Fort Sumter

Daniel Hough (c. 1825 – April 14, 1861) was an Irish-born American soldier who became the first man to die in the American Civil War. His death was accidental, caused by a cannon that went off prematurely during a salute to the flag after the Battle of Fort Sumter. He was an Irish immigrant, having been born in County Tipperary.

== Early life ==
Daniel Hough was born in County Tipperary, Ireland c. 1825. After emigrating to the United States from Ireland, Hough enlisted as a private in the U.S. Army, where he was put into Battery D of the 1st United States Artillery Regiment. After reenlistment at Fort Moultrie in 1859, Hough was assigned to Battery E of the same regiment. In January 1861, Battery E was relocated to Fort Sumter in Charleston harbor, where it stayed until the Battle of Fort Sumter.

== Death ==
On April 12, 1861, Fort Sumter came under attack. It is unknown where Hough served during the battle, but along with the rest of the garrison, he came through the battle unscathed and was present on April 14 during the 100-gun salute to the flag after the surrender. Hough was assigned to the 47th gun of the salute. Soon after Hough had loaded the gun, preparing to fire, a spark in the gun barrel set the cartridge off. The gun exploded, blowing off Hough's right arm and almost instantly killing him, as well as detonating ammunition stored next to the gun. Five other soldiers, including Edward Galloway, were wounded (Galloway would die of his wounds five days later in a hospital). The salute was cut short at fifty guns.

Although Hough was buried on the Fort Sumter parade ground during the surrender, it is not known where his remains are now. Possible fates are either burial in the Fort Moultrie burial ground or in the St. Lawrence Cemetery in Charleston. Alternatively, his body could have been destroyed while still in Fort Sumter during the Siege of Charleston.

== In popular culture ==
On October 7, 2012, a documentary entitled ‘What the Hough—The First Casualty of the American Civil War was a Tipperary Soldier’ produced by Tom Hurley was aired on Tipp FM radio in Ireland. It attempted to investigate the background of Private Daniel Hough by researching his story both in Ireland and America. The program revealed that Hough more than likely came from the Borrisokane area of County Tipperary.

== See also ==
- Edward Galloway – Regarded as the first soldier mortally wounded in the war
- John J. Williams – Regarded as the last soldier killed in the war
