= Edward Galloway =

American soldier killed early in the Civil War

- Born: September 1840; Skibbereen, Co.Cork, Ireland
- Died: April 19, 1861 (aged 20); Charleston, South Carolina
- Burial place: Unknown
- Military career
- Allegiance: United States
- Branch: United States Army
- Rank: Private
- Unit: Battery E, 1st United States Artillery Regiment
- Conflicts: American Civil War: Battle of Fort Sumter

Edward Galloway (September 1840 – April 19, 1861) was the first soldier in the American Civil War to be mortally wounded, and the war's second death, after Private Daniel Hough. He was injured when a gun went off prematurely on April 14, 1861, during a 100-gun salute to the flag after the Battle of Fort Sumter. The explosion killed Hough, severely injured Galloway, and slightly injured four other men. He was taken to the Gibbes Hospital in Charleston, where he died five days later on April 19, 1861. Edward was an Irish immigrant, he was born in Skibbereen, County Cork, Ireland.

== Military service ==
Galloway served as a private in Battery E of the 1st United States Artillery Regiment. In January 1861, the regiment was relocated to Fort Sumter, where it would be stationed until the Battle of Fort Sumter in April of the same year.

== Death ==
On April 12, 1861, Fort Sumter came under attack. It is unknown where Galloway served during the battle, but along with the rest of the garrison, he came through the battle unscathed and was present on April 14 during the 100-gun salute to the flag after the surrender, stationed at the 47th gun along with Private Daniel Hough. While Hough was loading the gun, a spark in the barrel of the gun made it explode prematurely. The explosion blew off Hough's right arm and killed him almost instantly. It also detonated ammunition stored next to the gun and wounded five other men, including Galloway. The salute was cut short at fifty guns. Galloway was severely wounded by the explosion, and was taken after the salute to the Gibbes Hospital in Charleston where he died five days later.

== Variations on name ==
There are several variations of his surname; the United States Registers of Enlistments in the U.S. Army, 1798–1914 recorded his name as Edward Gallwey. His brother, who was mortally wounded at Port Hudson and died in Baton Rouge on July 9, 1863, was Major Andrew Power Gallwey.

== Sources ==
- Boritt, Gabor (1996). Why the Civil War Came. Oxford University Press. ISBN 9780195113761.
- Crawford, Samuel (1881). The Genesis of the Civil War: The Story of Sumter, 1860–1861. C. L. Webster & Company. p. 446. "Edward Galloway Civil War."
