= Battle of Fort Sumter =

Opening battle of the American Civil War

- Part of the American Civil War
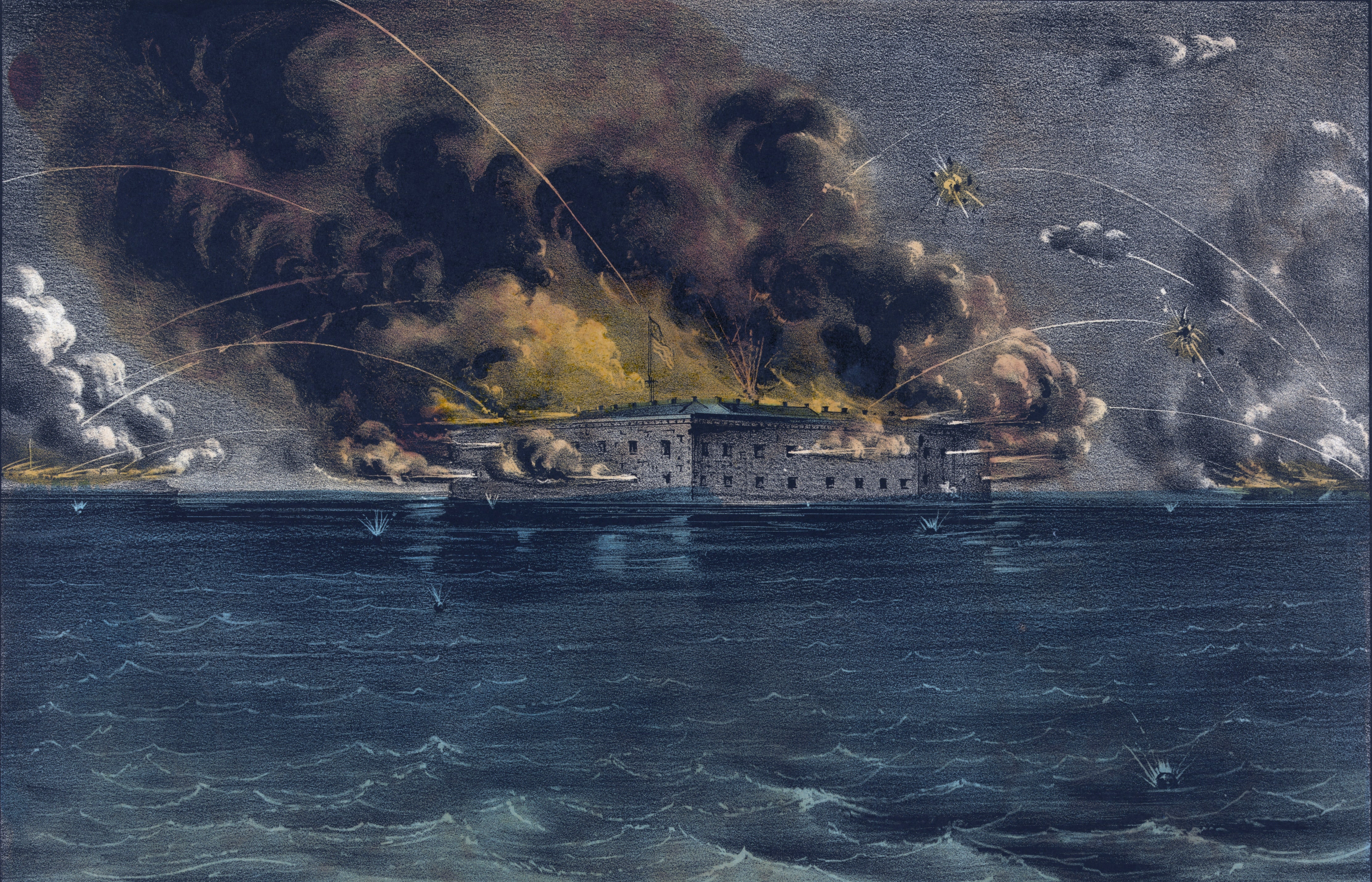
- Bombardment of Fort Sumter, a portrait by Currier and Ives
Date	April 12–13, 1861
Location	Charleston, South Carolina, U.S. 32°45′8″N 79°52′29″W
Result	Confederate victory: Confederacy captures Fort Sumter; Beginning of the American Civil War

Belligerents
United States	(Confederate States of America) Confederate States

Commanders and leaders
Robert Anderson (surrendered)	P. G. T. Beauregard

Units involved
E Battery 1st United States Artillery Regiment H Battery 1st United States Artillery Regiment	Provisional forces of the Confederate States

Strength
85	500–6,000 (estimated)

Casualties and losses
0	0

The Battle of Fort Sumter (also the Attack on Fort Sumter or the Fall of Fort Sumter) (April 12–13, 1861) was the bombardment of Fort Sumter near Charleston, South Carolina, by the South Carolina militia. It ended with the surrender of the fort by the United States Army, beginning the American Civil War.

Following the declaration of secession by South Carolina on December 20, 1860, its authorities demanded that the U.S. Army abandon its facilities in Charleston Harbor. On December 26, Major Robert Anderson of the U.S. Army surreptitiously moved his small command from the vulnerable Fort Moultrie on Sullivan's Island to Fort Sumter, a substantial fortress built on an island controlling the entrance of Charleston Harbor. An attempt by U.S. President James Buchanan to reinforce and resupply Anderson using the unarmed merchant ship Star of the West failed when it was fired upon by shore batteries on January 9, 1861. The ship was hit three times, which caused no major damage but kept the supplies from reaching Anderson.

During the early months of 1861, the situation around Fort Sumter increasingly began to resemble a siege. In March, Brigadier General P. G. T. Beauregard, the first general officer of the newly formed Confederate States Army, was placed in command of Confederate forces in Charleston. Beauregard energetically directed the strengthening of batteries around Charleston harbor aimed at Fort Sumter. Conditions in the fort deteriorated due to shortages of men, food, and supplies as the Union soldiers rushed to complete the installation of additional guns.

The resupply of Fort Sumter became the first crisis of the administration of U.S. President Abraham Lincoln, inaugurated March 4, 1861, following his victory in the election of November 6, 1860. He notified the Governor of South Carolina, Francis Wilkinson Pickens, that he was sending supply ships, which resulted in an ultimatum from the Confederate government for the immediate evacuation of Fort Sumter, which Major Anderson refused. Beginning at 4:30 a.m. on April 12, the Confederates bombarded the fort from artillery batteries surrounding the harbor. Although the Union garrison returned fire, they were significantly outgunned and, after 34 hours, Major Anderson agreed to evacuate. There were no deaths on either side as a direct result of this engagement, although a gun explosion during the surrender ceremonies on April 14 caused the death of two U.S. Army soldiers. The event often regarded as the "First Bloodshed of the Civil War" was the Baltimore riot of 1861, one week later.

Following the battle, there was widespread support from both North and South for further military action. Lincoln's immediate call for 75,000 volunteers to suppress the rebellion resulted in an additional four Southern states also declaring their secession and joining the Confederacy. The battle is usually recognized as the first of the American Civil War.

== Background ==
=== Secession ===
On December 20, 1860, shortly after Abraham Lincoln's victory in the presidential election of 1860, South Carolina adopted an ordinance declaring its secession from the United States of America, and by February 1861 six more Southern states had adopted similar ordinances of secession. On February 7, the seven states adopted a provisional constitution for the Confederate States of America and established their temporary capital at Montgomery, Alabama. A February peace conference met in Washington, D.C., but failed to resolve the crisis. The remaining eight slave states declined pleas to join the Confederacy.

The seceding states seized federal properties within their boundaries, including buildings, arsenals, and fortifications. President James Buchanan protested but took no action. Buchanan was concerned that an overt action could cause the remaining slave states to leave the Union, and while he thought that there was no constitutional authority for a state to secede, he could find no constitutional authority for him to act to prevent it.

=== Forts of Charleston ===
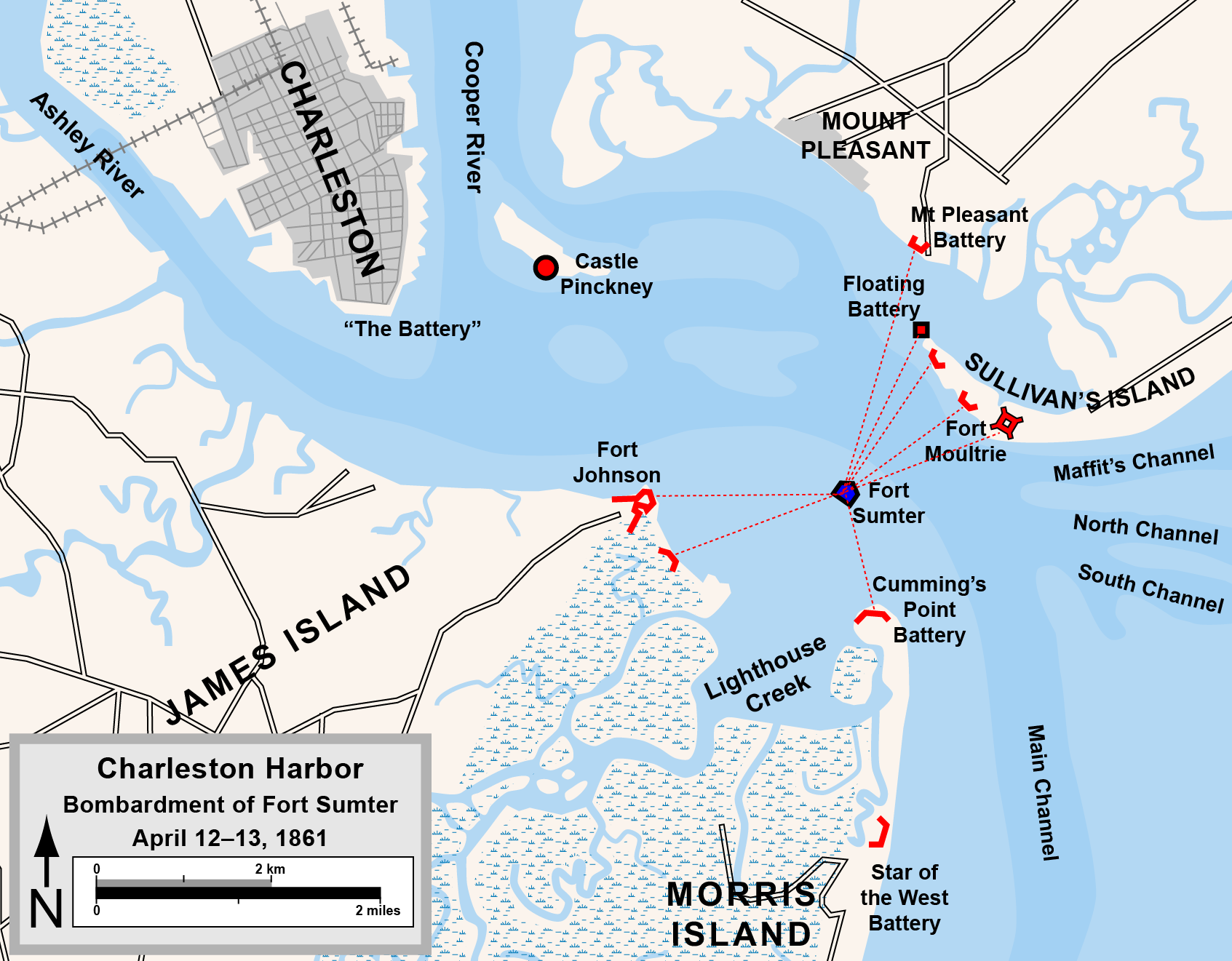
Charleston Harbor, showing forts and Confederate artillery positions

Several forts had been constructed in Charleston's harbor, including Fort Sumter and Fort Moultrie, which were not among the sites seized initially. Fort Moultrie on Sullivan Island was the oldest—it was the site of fortifications since 1776—and was the headquarters of the U.S. Army garrison. It had been designed as a gun platform for defending the harbor, and its defenses against land-based attacks were feeble; during the crisis, the Charleston newspapers commented that sand dunes had piled up against the walls in such a way that the wall could easily be scaled. When the garrison began clearing away the dunes, the papers objected.

Major Robert Anderson of the 1st U.S. Artillery regiment had been appointed to command the Charleston garrison that fall because of rising tensions. A native of Kentucky, he was a protégé of Winfield Scott, the general in chief of the Army, and was thought more capable of handling a crisis than the garrison's previous commander, Col. John L. Gardner, who was nearing retirement. Anderson had served an earlier tour of duty at Fort Moultrie and his father had been a defender of the fort, then called Fort Sullivan, during the American Revolutionary War.

Throughout the fall, South Carolina authorities considered both secession and the expropriation of federal property in the harbor to be inevitable. As tensions mounted, the environment around the fort increasingly resembled a siege, to the point that the South Carolina authorities placed picket ships to observe the movements of the troops and threatened to attack when forty rifles were transferred to one of the harbor forts from the U.S. arsenal in the city.

In contrast to Moultrie, Fort Sumter dominated the entrance to Charleston Harbor and, though unfinished, was designed to be one of the strongest fortresses in the world. In the fall of 1860 work on the fort was nearly completed, but the fortress was garrisoned by a single soldier, who functioned as a lighthouse keeper, and a small party of civilian construction workers. Under the cover of darkness on December 26, six days after South Carolina declared its secession, Anderson abandoned the indefensible Fort Moultrie, ordering its guns spiked and its gun carriages burned, and surreptitiously relocated his command by small boats to Sumter.

=== President Buchanan and the Star of the West ===
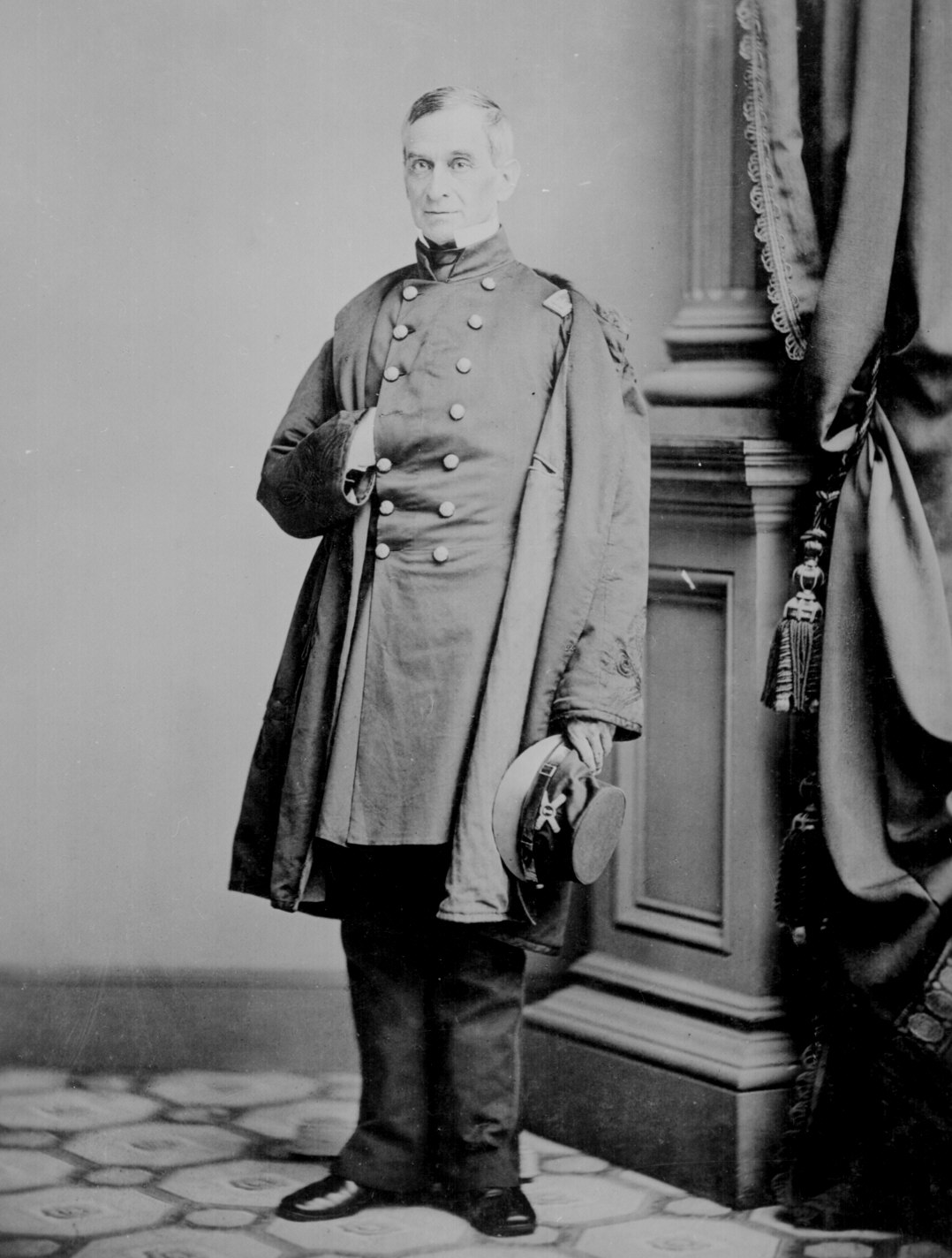
Maj. Robert Anderson

South Carolina authorities considered Anderson's move to be a breach of faith. Governor Francis Wilkinson Pickens believed that President Buchanan had made implicit promises to him to keep Sumter unoccupied and suffered political embarrassment as a result of his trust in those promises. Buchanan, a former U.S. Secretary of State and diplomat, had used carefully crafted ambiguous language to Pickens, promising that he would not "immediately" occupy it. From Major Anderson's standpoint, he was merely moving his existing garrison troops from one of the locations under his command to another. He had received instructions from the War Department on December 11, written by Major General Don Carlos Buell, Assistant Adjutant General of the Army, approved by Secretary of War John B. Floyd:

[Y]ou are to hold possession of the forts in this harbor, and if attacked you are to defend yourself to the last extremity. The smallness of your force will not permit you, perhaps, to occupy more than one of the three forts, but an attack on or attempt to take possession of any one of them will be regarded as an act of hostility, and you may then put your command into either of them which you may deem most proper to increase its power of resistance. You are also authorized to take similar steps whenever you have tangible evidence of a design to proceed to a hostile act.

Pickens, therefore, ordered that all remaining federal positions except Fort Sumter were to be seized. State troops quickly occupied Fort Moultrie (capturing 56 guns), Fort Johnson on James Island, and the battery on Morris Island. On December 27, an assault force of 150 men seized the Union-occupied Castle Pinckney fortification, in the harbor close to downtown Charleston, capturing 24 guns and mortars, while the small U.S. Army garrison retired to Fort Sumter to join Major Robert Anderson. On December 30, the federal arsenal in Charleston was captured, resulting in the acquisition of more than 22,000 weapons by the militia. (Note: The weapons in the arsenal consisted of about 18,000 muskets, 3,400 rifles, over 1,000 pistols, and a few artillery pieces including five 24-pound field howitzers.)

The Confederates promptly made repairs at Fort Moultrie. Dozens of new batteries and defense positions armed with weapons captured from the arsenal were constructed throughout the Charleston harbor area, including an unusual floating battery. (Note: The weapons in the arsenal consisted of about 18,000 muskets, 3,400 rifles, over 1,000 pistols, and a few artillery pieces including five 24-pound field howitzers.)

President Buchanan was surprised and dismayed at Anderson's move to Sumter, unaware of the authorization Anderson had received. Nevertheless, he refused Pickens's demand to evacuate Charleston harbor. Since the garrison's supplies were limited, Buchanan authorized a relief expedition of supplies, small arms, and 200 soldiers. The original intent was to send the Navy sloop-of-war USS Brooklyn, but it was discovered that Confederates had sunk some derelict ships to block the shipping channel into Charleston and there was concern that Brooklyn had too deep a draft to negotiate the obstacles. Instead, it seemed prudent to send an unarmed civilian merchant ship, Star of the West, which might be perceived as less provocative to the Confederates.

As Star of the West approached the harbor entrance on January 9, 1861, it was fired upon by a battery on Morris Island, which was staffed by cadets from The Citadel, among them William Stewart Simkins, who were the only trained artillerymen in the service of South Carolina at the time. Batteries from Fort Moultrie joined in and Star of the West was forced to withdraw. Major Anderson prepared his guns at Sumter when he heard the Confederate fire, but the secrecy of the operation had kept him unaware that a relief expedition was in progress and he chose not to start a general engagement.

In a letter delivered January 31, 1861, Pickens demanded of President Buchanan that he surrender Fort Sumter because, "I regard that possession is not consistent with the dignity or safety of the State of South Carolina."

=== Preparations for war ===
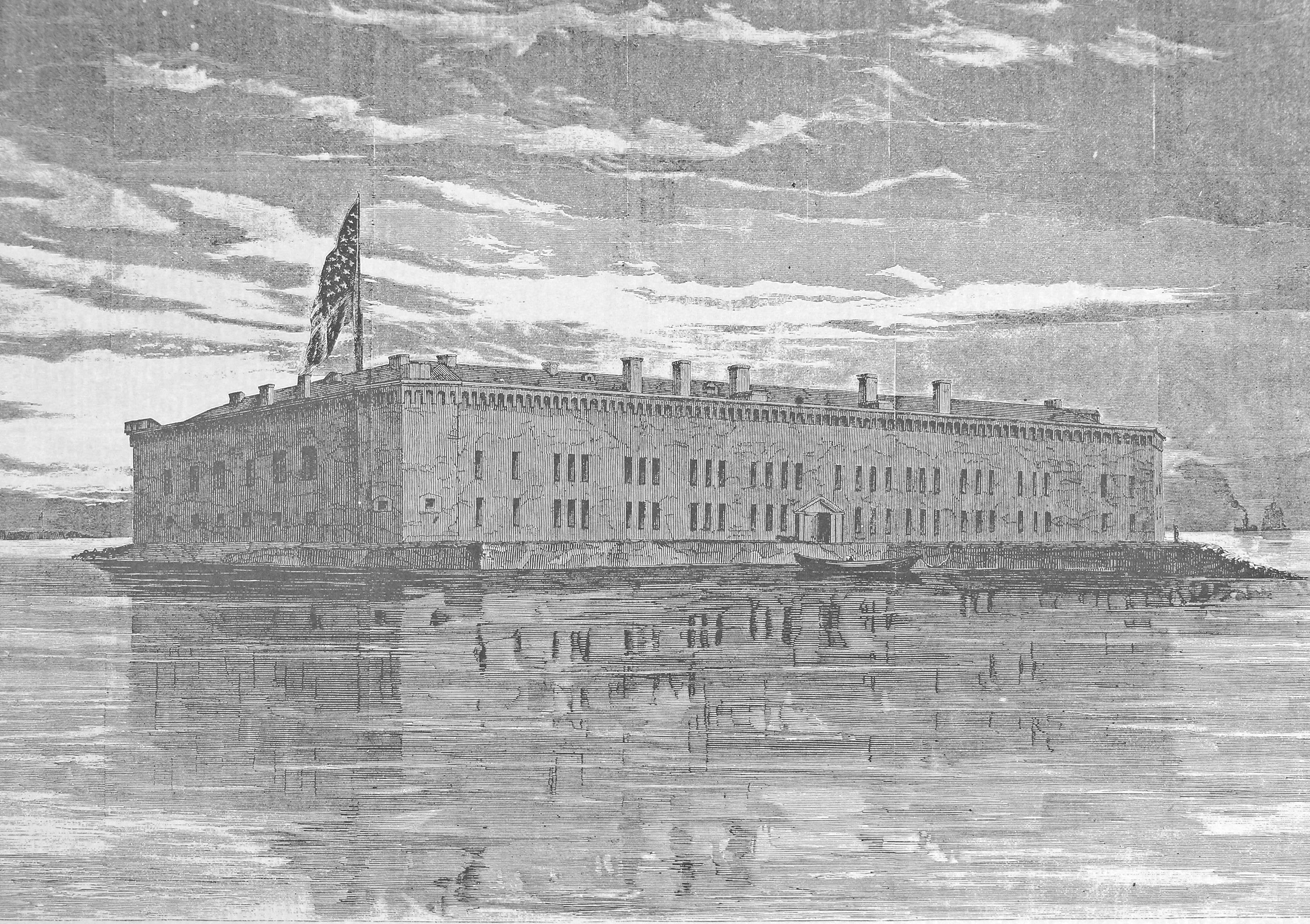
Fort Sumter before the battle

Conditions at the fort were difficult during the winter of 1860–1861. Rations were short and fuel for heat was limited. The garrison scrambled to complete the defenses as best they could. Fort Sumter was designed to mount 135 guns, operated by 650 officers and men, but construction had met with numerous delays for decades and budget cuts had left it only about 90 percent finished in early 1861. Anderson's garrison consisted of just 85 men, primarily made up of two small artillery companies: Company E, 1st U.S. Artillery, commanded by Capt. Abner Doubleday, and Company H, commanded by Capt. Truman Seymour.

There were six other officers present: Surgeon Samuel W. Crawford, First Lt. Theodore Talbot of Company H, First Lt. Jefferson C. Davis of the 1st U.S. Artillery, and Second Lt. Norman J. Hall of Company H. Capt. John G. Foster and First Lt. George W. Snyder of the Corps of Engineers were responsible for the construction of the Charleston forts, but they reported to their headquarters in Washington, not directly to Anderson. The remaining personnel were 68 noncommissioned officers and privates, eight musicians, and 43 noncombatant workmen.

By April, US Army troops had positioned 60 guns, but they had insufficient men to operate them all. The fort consisted of three levels of enclosed gun positions, or casemates. The second level of casemates was unoccupied. The majority of the guns were on the first level of casemates, on the upper level (the parapet or barbette positions), and on the center parade field. Unfortunately for the defenders, the original mission of the fort—harbor defense—meant that it was designed so that the guns were primarily aimed at the Atlantic, with little capability of protecting from artillery fire from the surrounding land, or from infantry conducting an amphibious assault.

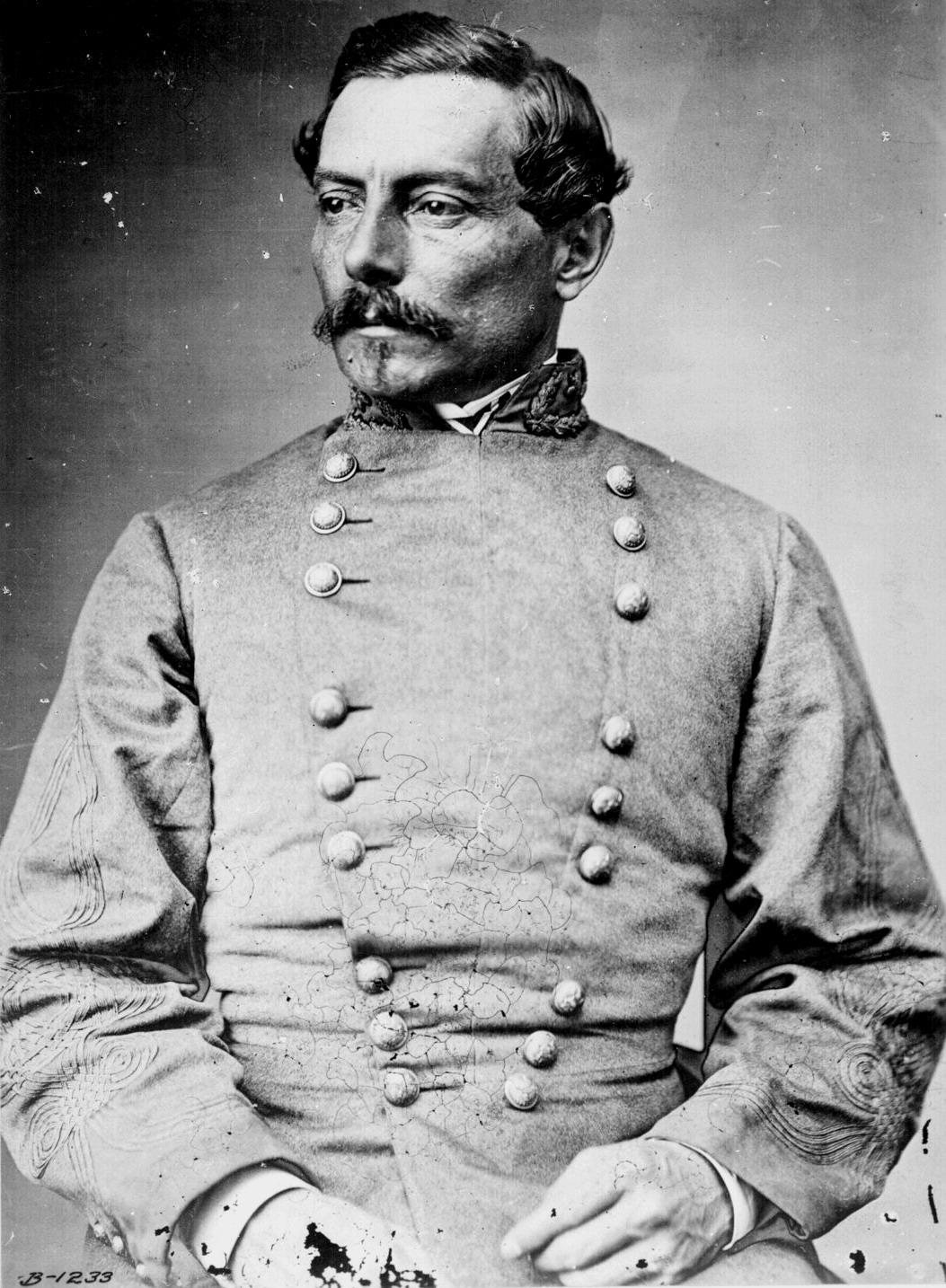
Brig. Gen. P. G. T. Beauregard

In March, Brig. Gen. P. G. T. Beauregard took command of South Carolina forces in Charleston. On March 1, President Jefferson Davis had appointed him the first general officer in the armed forces of the new Confederacy, specifically to take command of the siege. Beauregard made repeated demands that the Union force either surrender or withdraw, and took steps to ensure that no supplies from the city were available to the defenders, whose food was running low. He also increased drills amongst the South Carolina militia, training them to operate the guns they manned. Major Anderson had been Beauregard's artillery instructor at West Point. The two had been especially close, and Beauregard had become Anderson's assistant after graduation. Both sides spent March drilling and improving their fortifications to the best of their abilities.

Beauregard, a trained military engineer, built up overwhelming strength to challenge Fort Sumter. Fort Moultrie had three 8-inch Columbiads, two 8-inch howitzers, five 32-pound smoothbores, and four 24-pounders. Outside of Moultrie were five 10-inch mortars, two 32-pounders, two 24-pounders, and a 9-inch Dahlgren smoothbore. The floating battery next to Fort Moultrie had two 42-pounders and two 32-pounders on a raft protected by iron shielding. Fort Johnson on James Island had one 24-pounder and four 10-inch mortars.

At Cummings Point on Morris Island, the Confederates had emplaced seven 10-inch mortars, two 42-pounders, a British 12-pound Blakely rifle, and three 8-inch Columbiads. The Columbiads were in the so-called Iron Battery, protected by a wooden shield faced with iron bars. About 6,000 men were available to man the artillery and to assault the fort, if necessary, including the local militia, young boys, and older men.

=== Decisions for war ===
On March 4, 1861, Abraham Lincoln was inaugurated as president. He was almost immediately confronted with the surprise information that Major Anderson was reporting that only six weeks of rations remained at Fort Sumter. A crisis similar to the one at Fort Sumter had emerged at Pensacola, Florida, where Confederates threatened another U.S. fortification—Fort Pickens. Lincoln and his new cabinet struggled with the decisions of whether to reinforce the forts, and how. They were also concerned about whether to take actions that might start open hostilities and which side would be perceived as the aggressor as a result. Similar discussions and concerns were occurring in the Confederacy.

After the formation of the Confederate States of America in early February, there was some debate among the secessionists whether the capture of the fort was rightly a matter for South Carolina or for the newly declared national government in Montgomery, Alabama. Pickens was among the states' rights advocates who thought that all property in Charleston harbor had reverted to South Carolina upon that state's secession as an independent commonwealth. This debate ran alongside another discussion about how aggressively the installations—including Forts Sumter and Pickens—should be obtained. President Davis, like his counterpart in Washington, preferred that his side not be seen as the aggressor.

Both sides believed that the first side to use force would lose precious political support in the border states, whose allegiance was undetermined. Before Lincoln's inauguration on March 4, five states had voted against secession, including Virginia, and Lincoln openly offered to evacuate Fort Sumter if it would guarantee Virginia's loyalty. When asked about that offer, Abraham Lincoln commented, "A state for a fort is no bad business."

The South sent delegations to Washington, D.C., and offered to pay for the federal properties and enter into a peace treaty with the United States. Lincoln rejected any negotiations with the Confederate agents because he did not consider the Confederacy a legitimate nation, and making any treaty with it would be tantamount to recognition of it as a sovereign government. However, Secretary of State William H. Seward, who wished to give up Sumter for political reasons—as a gesture of good will—engaged in unauthorized and indirect negotiations that failed.

On April 4, as the supply situation on Sumter became critical, President Lincoln ordered a relief expedition, to be commanded by a former naval captain, and future Assistant Secretary of the Navy, Gustavus V. Fox, who proposed a plan for nighttime landings of smaller vessels than the Star of the West. Fox's orders were to land at Sumter with supplies only, and if he was opposed by the Confederates, to respond with the U.S. Navy vessels following and to then land both supplies and men. This time, Maj. Anderson was informed of the impending expedition, although the arrival date was not revealed to him. On April 6, Lincoln notified Pickens that "an attempt will be made to supply Fort Sumter with provisions only, and that if such attempt be not resisted, no effort to throw in men, arms, or ammunition will be made without further notice, [except] in case of an attack on the fort."

Lincoln's notification was made to the governor of South Carolina, not the new Confederate government, which Lincoln did not recognize. Pickens consulted with Beauregard, the local Confederate commander. Soon President Davis ordered Beauregard to repeat the demand for Sumter's surrender, and if it did not, to reduce the fort before the relief expedition arrived. The Confederate cabinet, meeting in Montgomery, endorsed Davis's order on April 9. Only Secretary of State Robert Toombs opposed this decision: he reportedly told Jefferson Davis the attack "will lose us every friend at the North. You will only strike a hornet's nest. ... Legions now quiet will swarm out and sting us to death. It is unnecessary. It puts us in the wrong. It is fatal."

Beauregard dispatched aides—Col. James Chesnut, Col. James A. Chisholm, and Capt. Stephen D. Lee—to Fort Sumter on April 11 to issue the ultimatum. Anderson refused, although he reportedly commented, "I shall await the first shot, and if you do not batter us to pieces, we shall be starved out in a few days." The aides returned to Charleston and reported this comment to Beauregard. At 1 a.m. on April 12, the aides brought Anderson a message from Beauregard: "If you will state the time which you will evacuate Fort Sumter, and agree in the meantime that you will not use your guns against us unless ours shall be employed against Fort Sumter, we will abstain from opening fire upon you."

After consulting with his senior officers, Maj. Anderson replied that he would evacuate Sumter by noon, April 15, unless he received new orders from his government or additional supplies. Col. Chesnut considered this reply to be too conditional and wrote a reply, which he handed to Anderson at 3:20 a.m.: "Sir: by authority of Brigadier General Beauregard, commanding the Provisional Forces of the Confederate States, we have the honor to notify you that he will open fire of his batteries on Fort Sumter in one hour from this time." Anderson escorted the officers back to their boat, shook hands with each one, and said "If we never meet in this world again, God grant that we may meet in the next."

== Bombardment ==
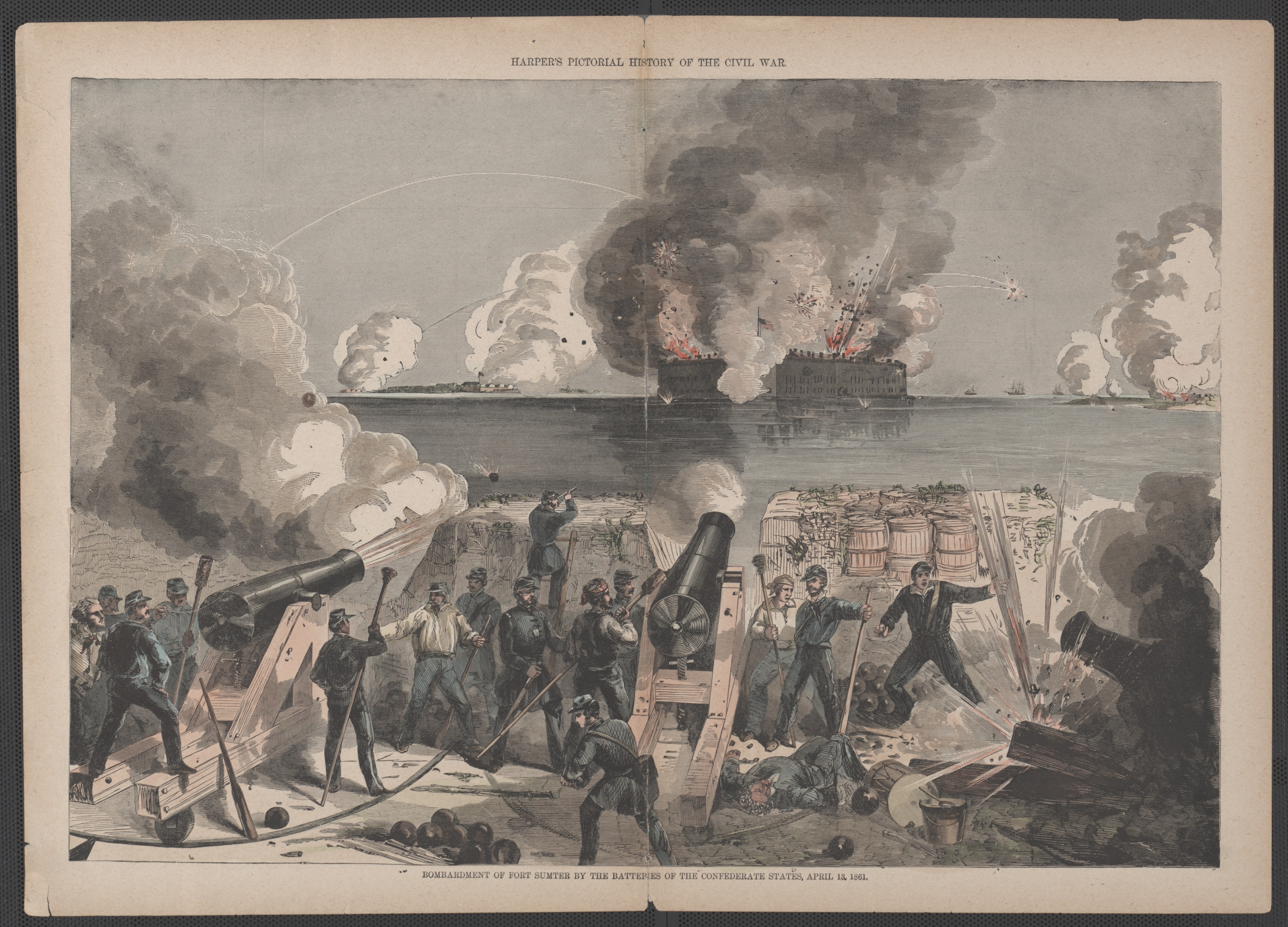
Bombardment of the Fort by the Confederates

At 4:30 a.m. on April 12, 1861, Lt. Henry S. Farley, acting upon the command of Capt. George S. James, fired a single 10-inch mortar round from Fort Johnson. James had offered the first shot to Roger Pryor, a noted Virginia secessionist, who declined, saying, "I could not fire the first gun of the war". The shell exploded over Fort Sumter as a signal to open the general bombardment from 43 guns and mortars at Fort Moultrie, Fort Johnson, the floating battery, and Cummings Point. Under orders from Beauregard, the guns fired in a counterclockwise sequence around the harbor, with 2 minutes between each shot. Beauregard wanted to conserve ammunition, which he calculated would last for only 48 hours. (Note: Detzer comments that Ruffin claimed he fired the first shot, when Ruffin did not actually do so.)

Edmund Ruffin, another noted Virginia secessionist, had traveled to Charleston to be present at the beginning of the war, and after the signal round, fired one of the first shots at Sumter, a 64-pound shell from the Iron Battery at Cummings Point. The shelling of Fort Sumter from the batteries ringing the harbor awakened Charleston's residents, including diarist Mary Chesnut, who rushed out into the predawn darkness to watch the shells arc over the water and burst inside the fort. (Note: Detzer comments that Ruffin claimed he fired the first shot, when Ruffin did not actually do so.)

Major Anderson held his fire, awaiting daylight. His troops reported for a call at 6 a.m. and then had breakfast. At 7 a.m., Capt. Abner Doubleday fired a shot at the Ironclad Battery at Cummings Point, but missed. Given the available manpower, Anderson could not take advantage of all of his 60 guns. He deliberately avoided using guns that were situated in the fort where casualties were most likely. The fort's best cannons were mounted on the uppermost of its three tiers—the barbette tier—where his troops were most exposed to incoming fire from overhead.

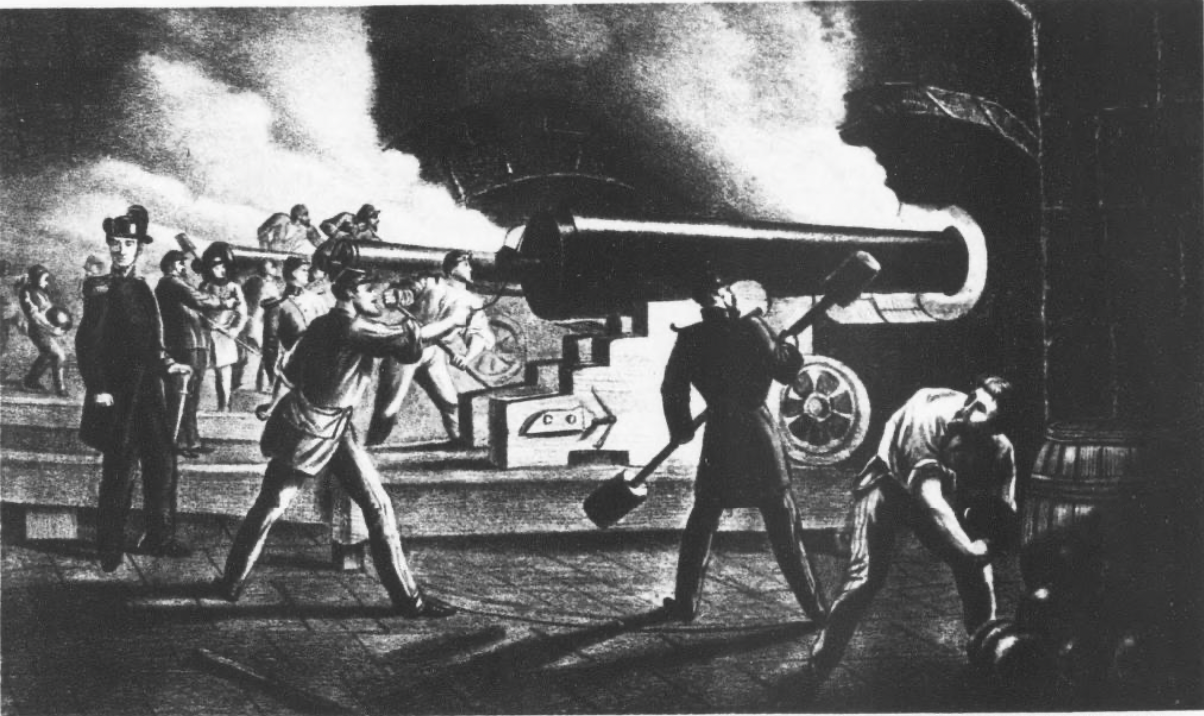
An illustration of federal troops returning fire

The fort had been designed to withstand a naval assault, and naval warships of the time did not mount guns capable of elevating to shoot over the walls of the fort. However, the land-based cannons manned by the Confederates were capable of high-arcing ballistic trajectories and could therefore fire at parts of the fort that would have been out of naval guns' reach. Fort Sumter's garrison could only safely fire the 21 working guns on the lowest level, which themselves, because of the limited elevation allowed by their embrasures, were largely incapable of delivering fire with trajectories high enough to seriously threaten Fort Moultrie.

Although the Federals had moved as many of their supplies to Fort Sumter as they could manage, the fort was quite low on ammunition and was nearly out at the end of the 34-hour bombardment. A more immediate problem was the scarcity of cloth gunpowder cartridges or bags. Only 700 were available at the beginning of the battle and workmen sewed frantically to create more, in some cases using socks from Anderson's personal wardrobe. Because of the shortages, Anderson reduced his firing to only six guns: two aimed at Cummings Point, two at Fort Moultrie, and two at the Sullivan's Island batteries.

Ships from Fox's relief expedition began to arrive on April 12. Although Fox arrived at 3 a.m. on his steamer Baltic, most of the rest of his fleet was delayed until 6 p.m., and one of the two warships, USS Powhatan, never arrived. Unbeknownst to Fox, it had been ordered to the relief of Fort Pickens in Florida. As small craft were sent toward the fort with supplies, the artillery fire deterred them and they pulled back. Fox decided to wait until after dark and for the arrival of his warships. The next day, heavy seas made it difficult to load the small boats with men and supplies and Fox was left with the hope that Anderson and his men could hold out until dark on April 13.

Although Sumter was a masonry fort, there were wooden buildings inside for barracks and officer quarters. The Confederates targeted these with heated shot (cannonballs heated red hot in a furnace), starting fires that could have proven more dangerous to the men than explosive artillery shells. At 7 p.m. on April 12, a rain shower extinguished the flames. At the same time, the Union gunners stopped firing for the night. They slept fitfully, concerned about a potential infantry assault against the fort. During the darkness, the Confederates reduced their fire to four shots each hour. The following morning, the full bombardment resumed and the Confederates continued firing hot shot against the wooden buildings.

By noon most of the wooden buildings in the fort and the main gate were on fire. The flames moved toward the main ammunition magazine, where 300 barrels of gunpowder were stored. The Union soldiers frantically tried to move the barrels to safety, but two-thirds were left when Anderson judged it was too dangerous and ordered the magazine doors closed. He ordered the remaining barrels thrown into the sea, but the tide kept floating them back together into groups, some of which were ignited by incoming artillery rounds. He also ordered his crews to redouble their efforts at firing, but the Confederates did the same, firing the hot shots almost exclusively. Many of the Confederate soldiers admired the courage and determination of the Yankees. When the fort had to pause its firing, the Confederates often cheered and applauded after the firing resumed and they shouted epithets at some of the nearby Union ships for failing to come to the fort's aid.

== Surrender ==
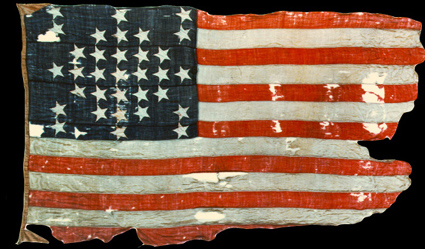
The Fort Sumter Flag

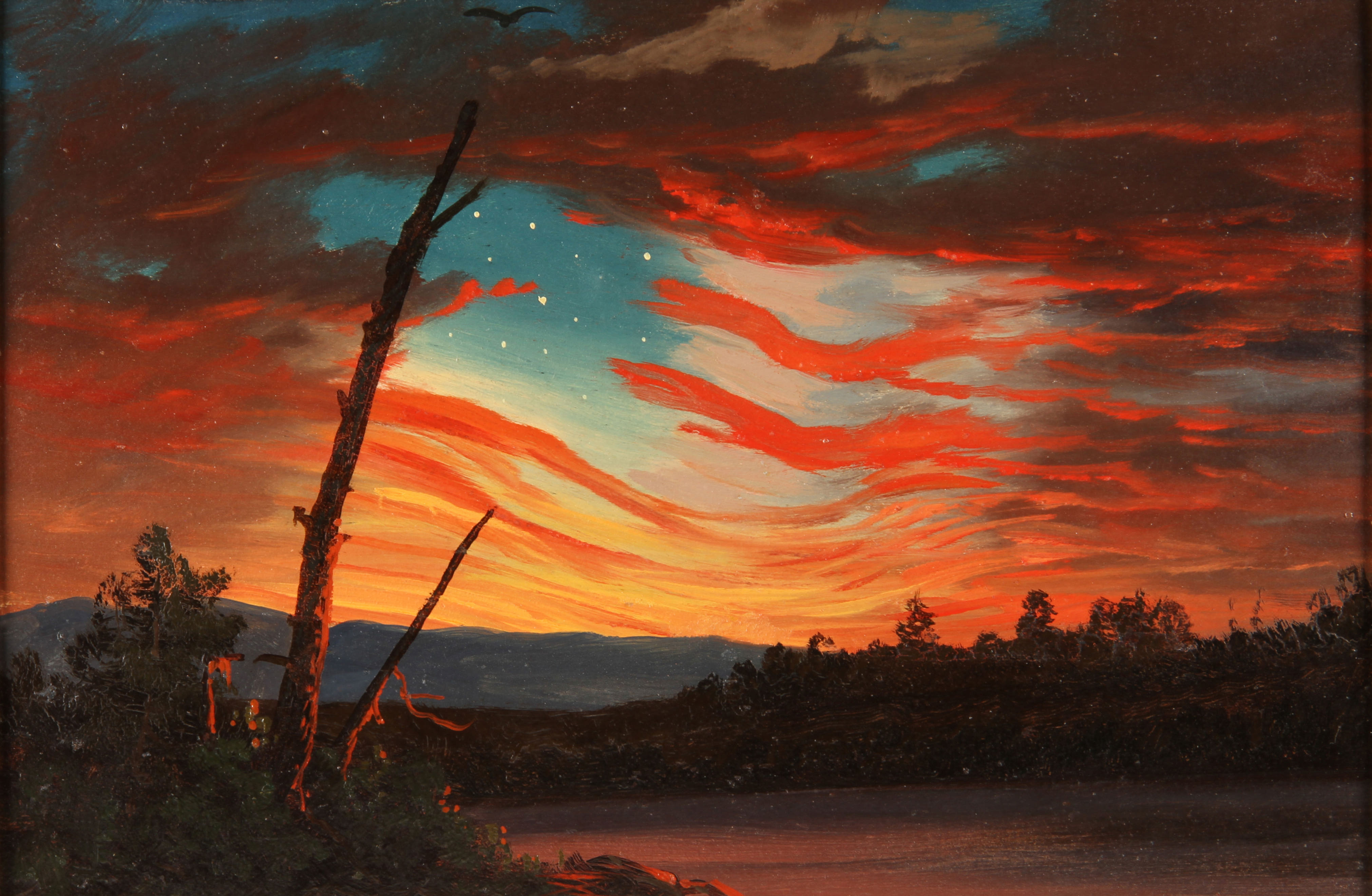
Our Banner in the Sky (1861) by Frederic Edwin Church

The fort's central flagpole was knocked down at 1 p.m. on April 13, raising doubts among the Confederates about whether the fort was ready to surrender. Col. Louis Wigfall, a former U.S. senator, had been observing the battle and decided that this indicated the fort had endured enough. He commandeered a small boat and proceeded from Morris Island, waving a white handkerchief from his sword, dodging incoming rounds from Sullivan's Island. Meeting with Major Anderson, he said, "You have defended your flag nobly, Sir. You have done all that it is possible to do, and General Beauregard wants to stop this fight. On what terms, Major Anderson, will you evacuate this fort?" Anderson was encouraged that Wigfall had said "evacuate," not "surrender." He was low on ammunition, fires were burning out of control, and his men were hungry and exhausted. Satisfied that they had defended their post with honor, enduring over 3,000 Confederate rounds without losing a man, Anderson agreed to a truce at 2:00 p.m.

Fort Sumter raised Wigfall's white handkerchief on its flagpole as Wigfall departed in his small boat back to Morris Island, where he was hailed as a hero. The handkerchief was spotted in Charleston and a delegation of officers representing Beauregard—Stephen D. Lee, Porcher Miles, a former mayor of Charleston, and Roger Pryor—sailed to Sumter, unaware of Wigfall's visit. Anderson was outraged when these officers disavowed Wigfall's authority, telling him that the former senator had not spoken with Beauregard for two days, and he threatened to resume firing. Meanwhile, General Beauregard himself had finally seen the handkerchief and sent a second set of officers, offering essentially the same terms that Wigfall had presented, so the agreement was reinstated.

The Union garrison formally surrendered the fort to Confederate personnel at 2:30 p.m., April 13. No one from either side was killed during the bombardment. During the 100-gun salute to the U.S. flag—Anderson's one condition for withdrawal—a pile of cartridges blew up from a spark, mortally wounding privates Daniel Hough and Edward Galloway, and seriously wounding the other four members of the gun crew; these were the first military fatalities of the war. The salute was stopped at fifty shots. Hough was buried in the Fort Sumter parade ground within two hours after the explosion. Galloway and Private George Fielding were sent to the hospital in Charleston, where Galloway died a few days later; Fielding was released after six weeks. The other wounded men and the remaining Union troops were placed aboard a Confederate steamer, the Isabel, where they spent the night and were transported the next morning to Fox's relief ship Baltic, resting outside the harbor bar.

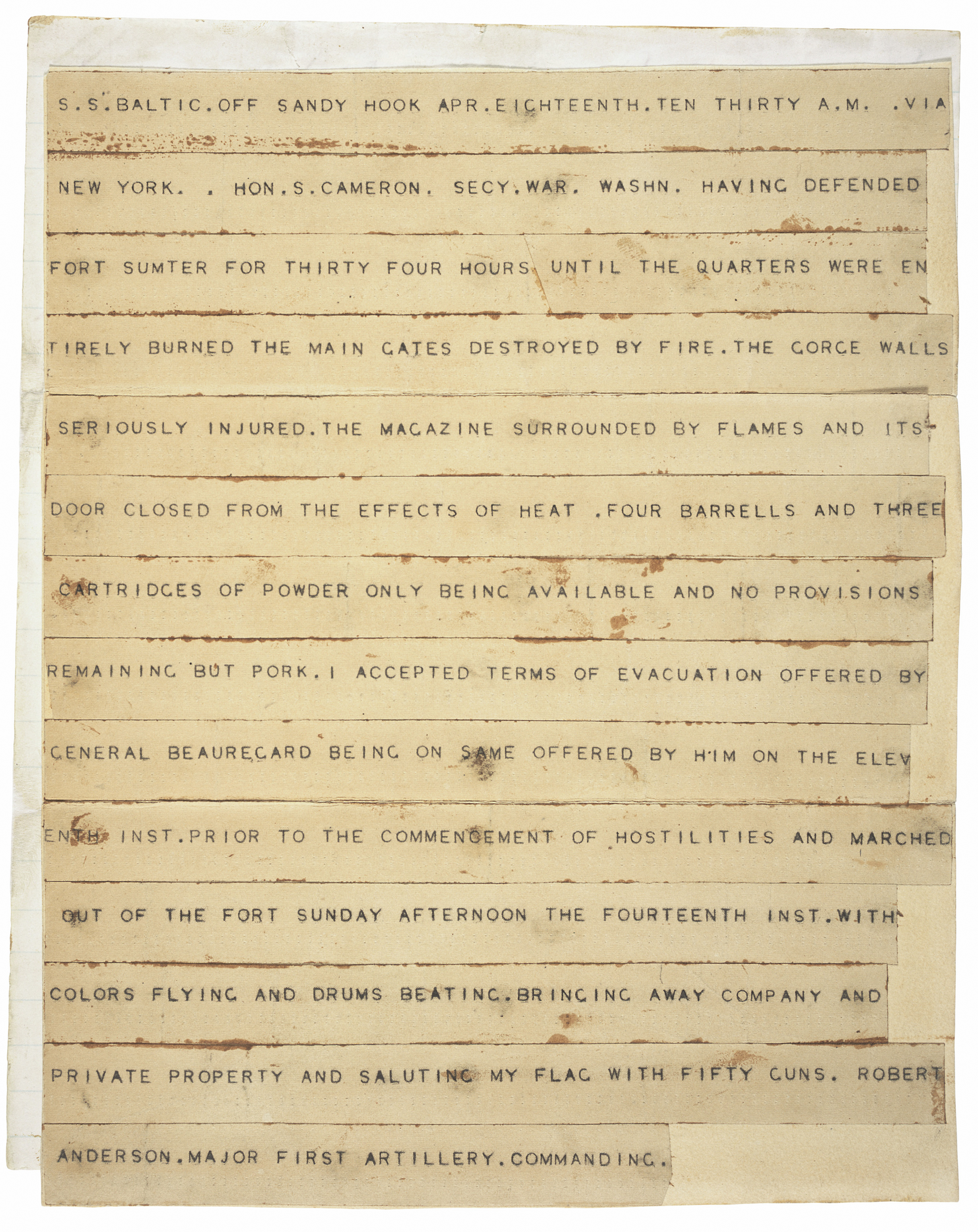
Major Robert Anderson's telegram, April 18, 1861

Steamship Baltic, oft Sandy Hook
Thursday, April 18

Hon. S. Cameron, Sec'y. of War, Washington, D. C.
Sir—Having defended Fort Sumter for thirty-four hours, until the quarters were entirely burned, the main gates destroyed by fire, the gorge wall seriously injured, the magazine surrounded by flames, and its door closed from the effects of the heat, four barrels and three cartridges of powder only being available, and no provision but pork remaining, I accepted terms of evacuation, offered by Gen. Beauregard, being the same offered by him on the 11th inst., prior to the commencement of hostilities, and marched out of the fort Sunday afternoon, the 14th inst., with colors flying and drums beating, bringing away company and private property, and saluting my flag with fifty guns.

ROBERT ANDERSON
Major First Artillery.

Anderson carried the Fort Sumter Flag with him north, where it became a widely known symbol of the battle and rallying point for supporters of the Union. This inspired Frederic Edwin Church to paint Our Banner in the Sky, described as a "symbolic landscape embodying the stars and stripes." A chromolithograph was then created and sold to benefit the families of Union soldiers.

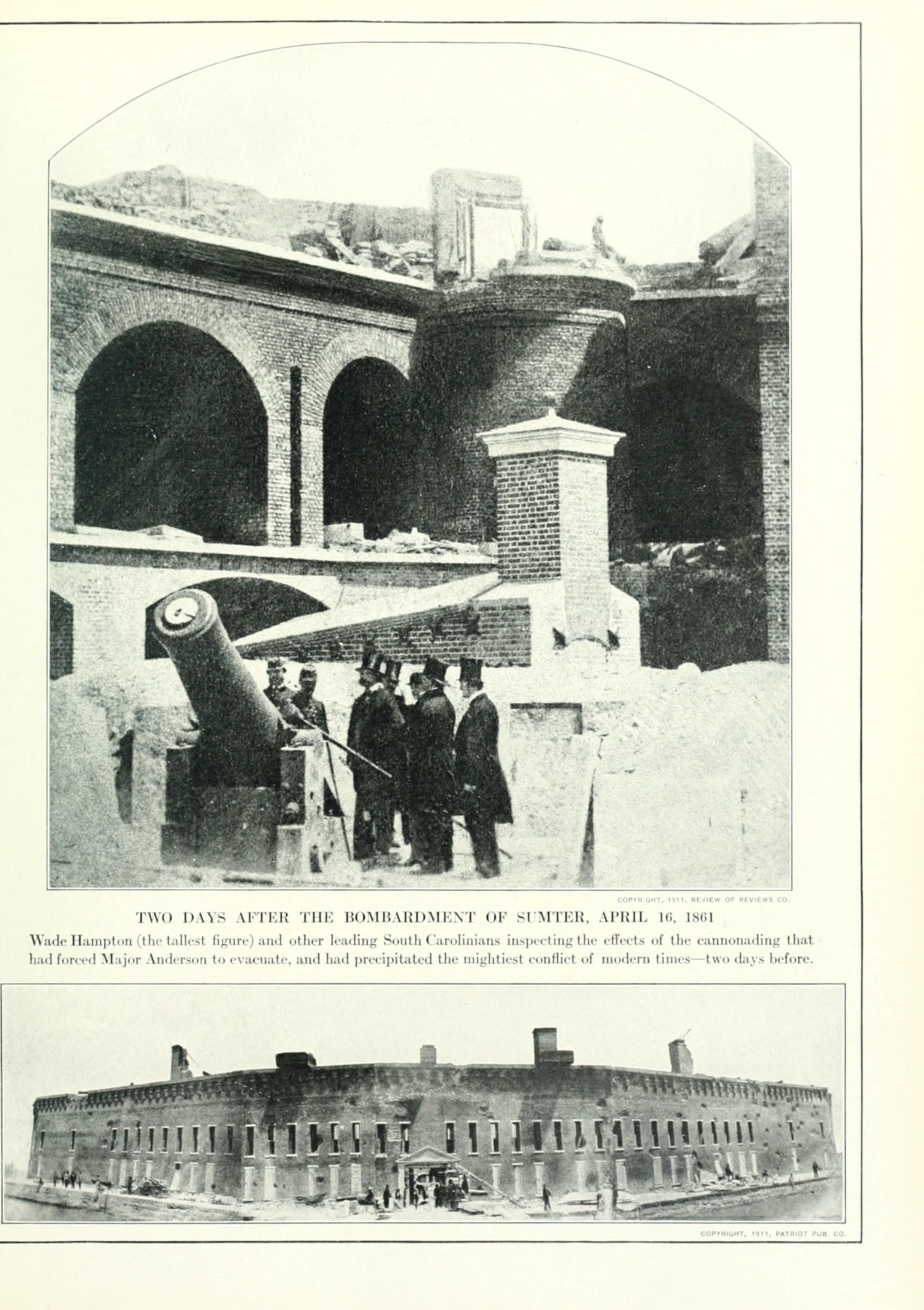
[Top] The Hot shot furnace at a right shoulder angle and a 10-in. columbard cannon pointing to Charleston.[Bottom] The Gorge and the Sally Port, April 1861, after its surrender

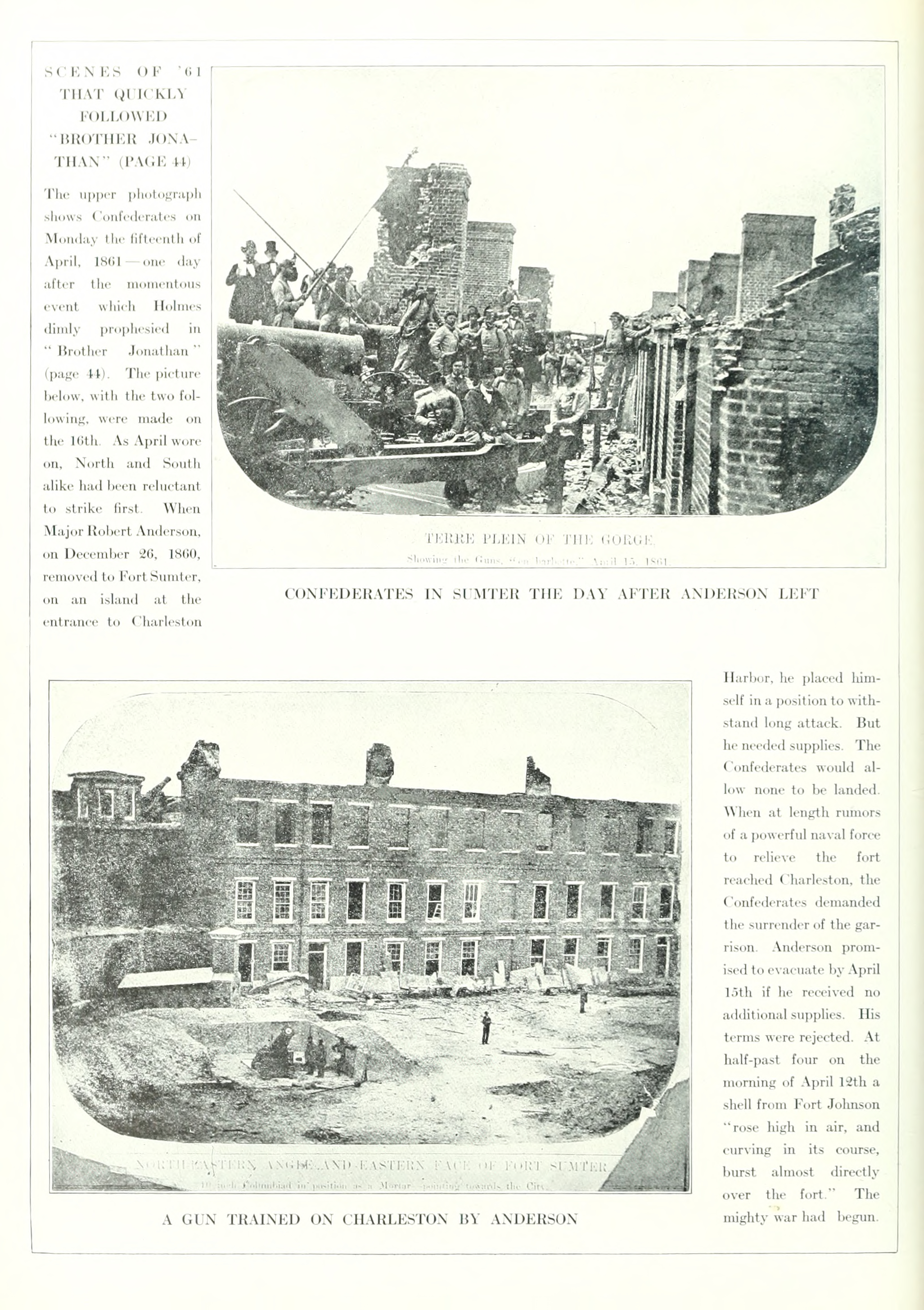
Views of Ft Sumter; [Bottom] View of right angle

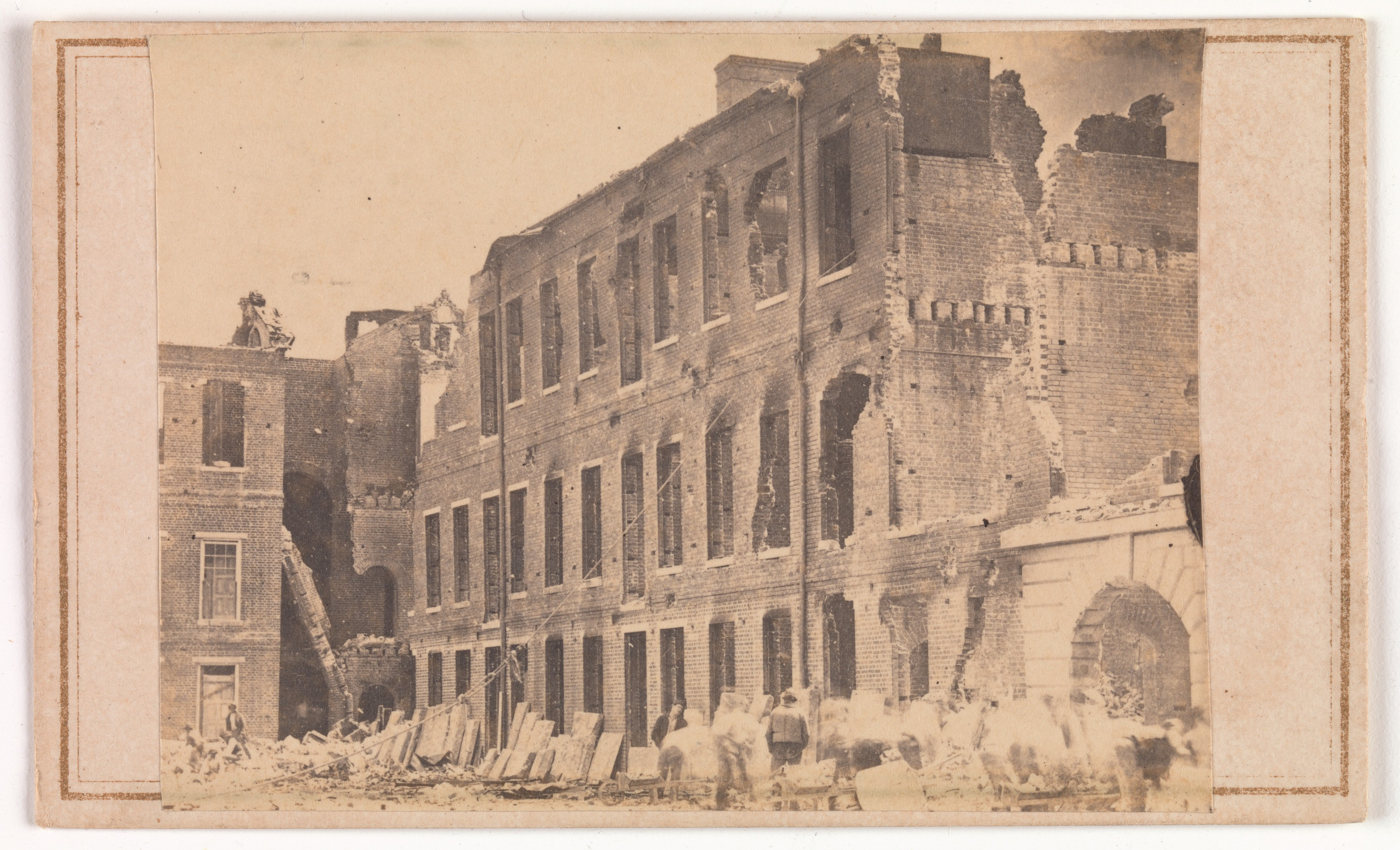
Right angle gorge of Ft Sumter—Sally port is at right

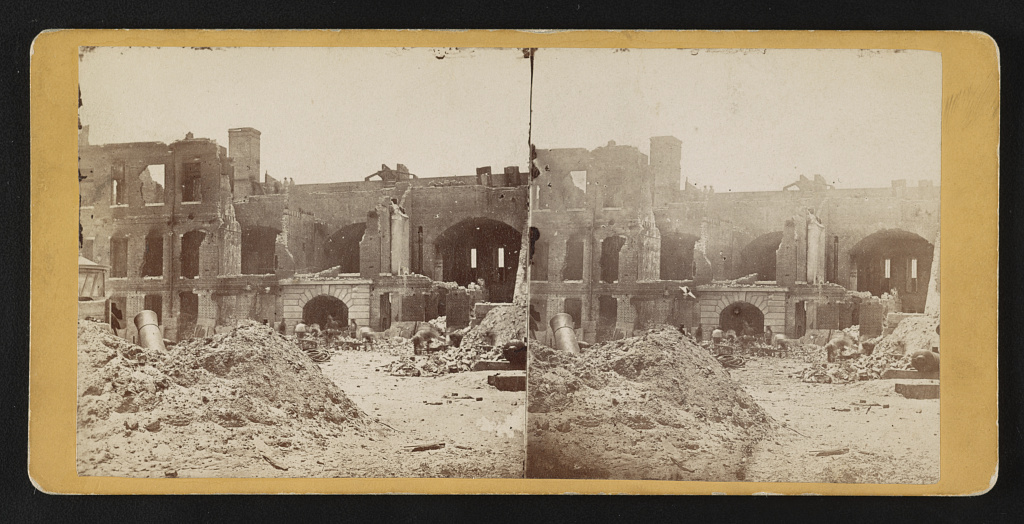
The Gorge and the Sally Port

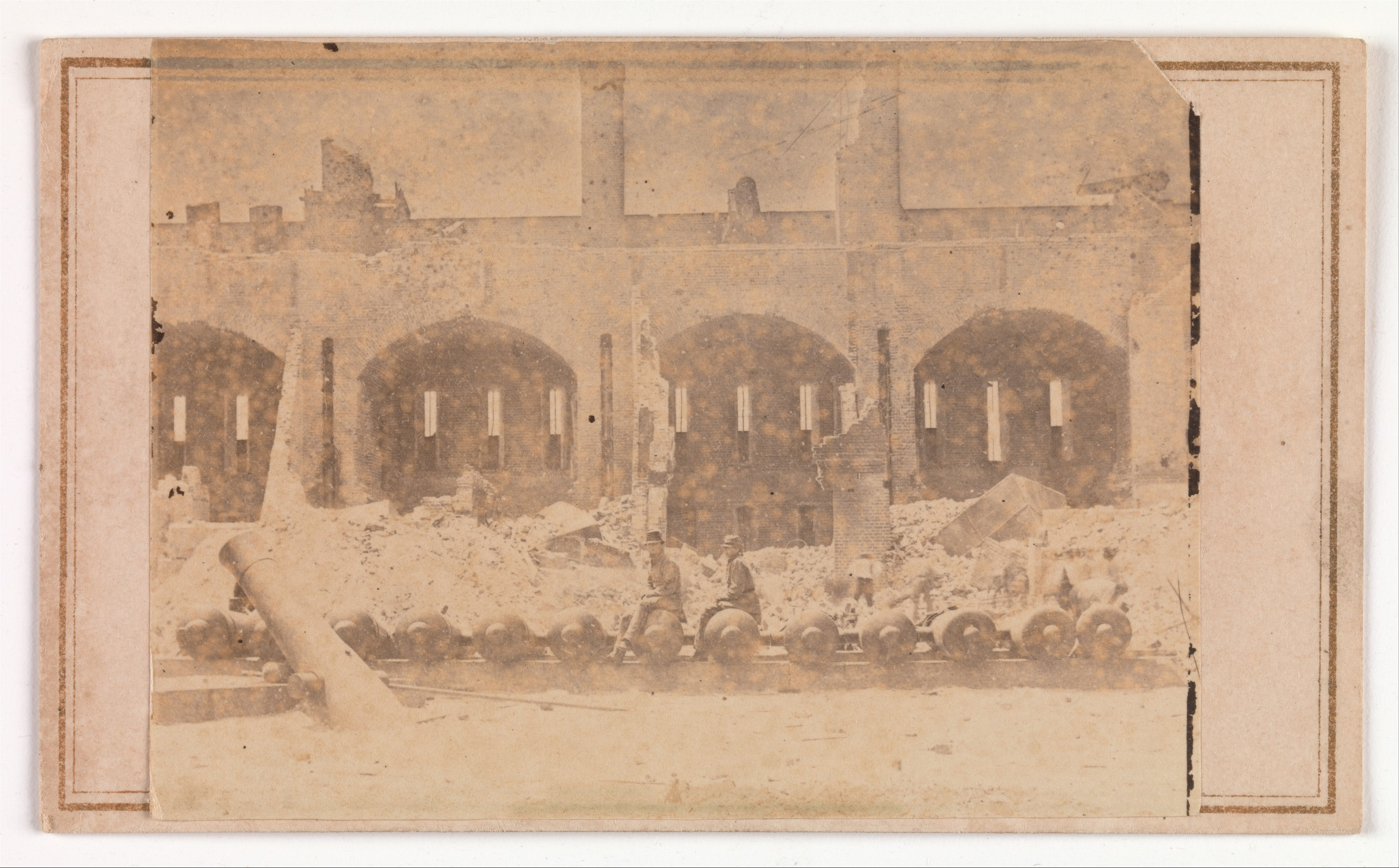
The western part of the Gorge

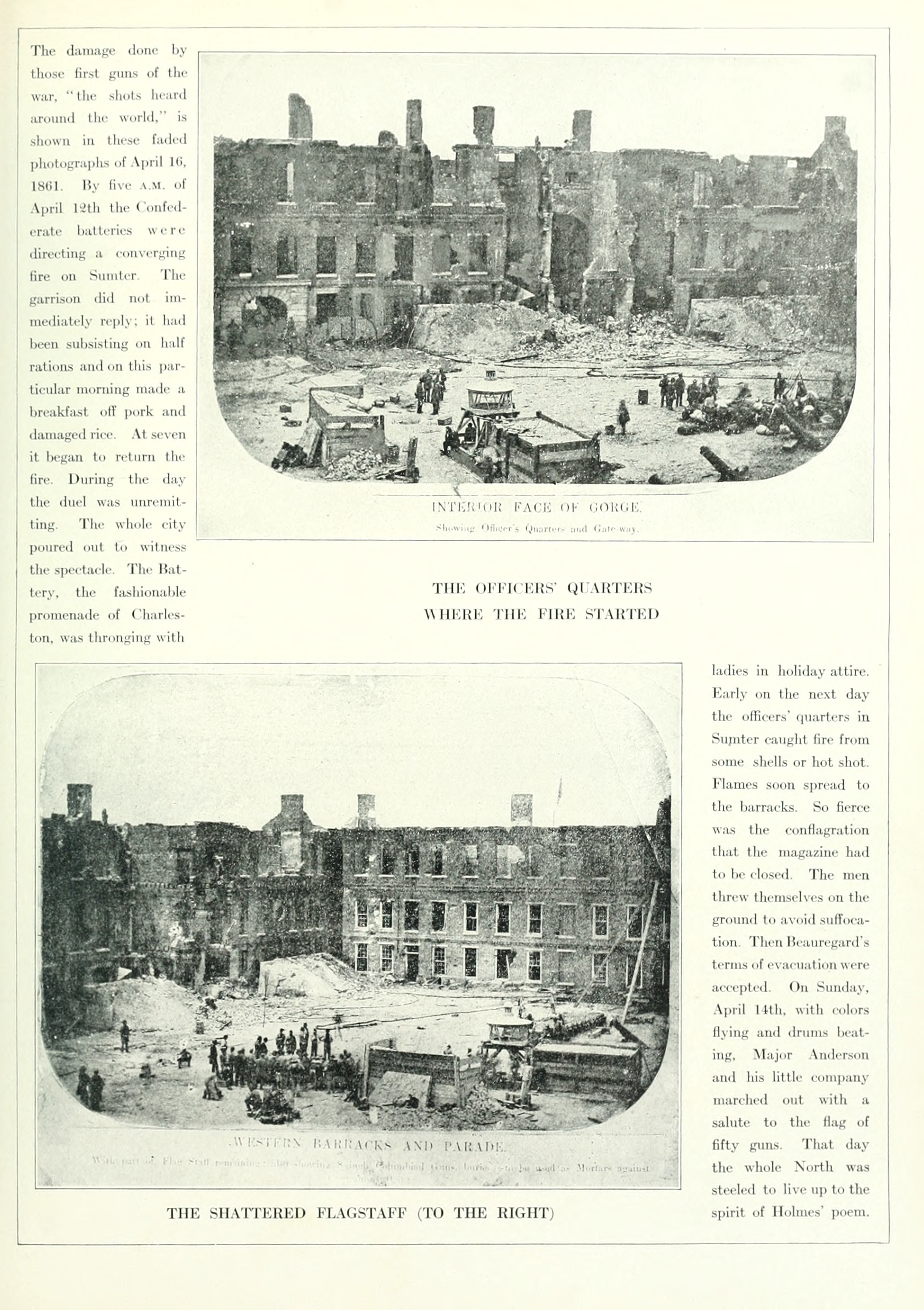
[Top] The gorge and Sally port. [Bottom] Left gorge Angle

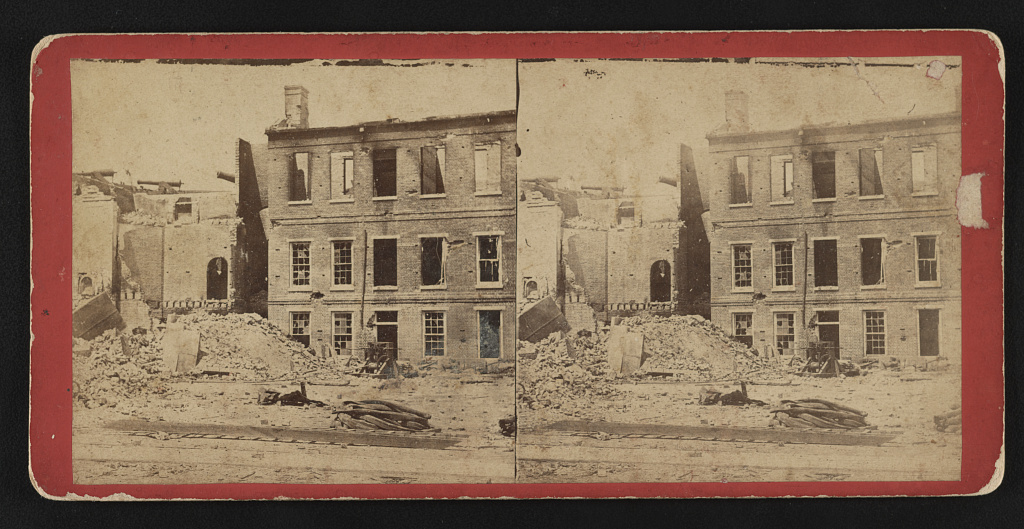
The left of the gorge. The Sally Port would be at far left

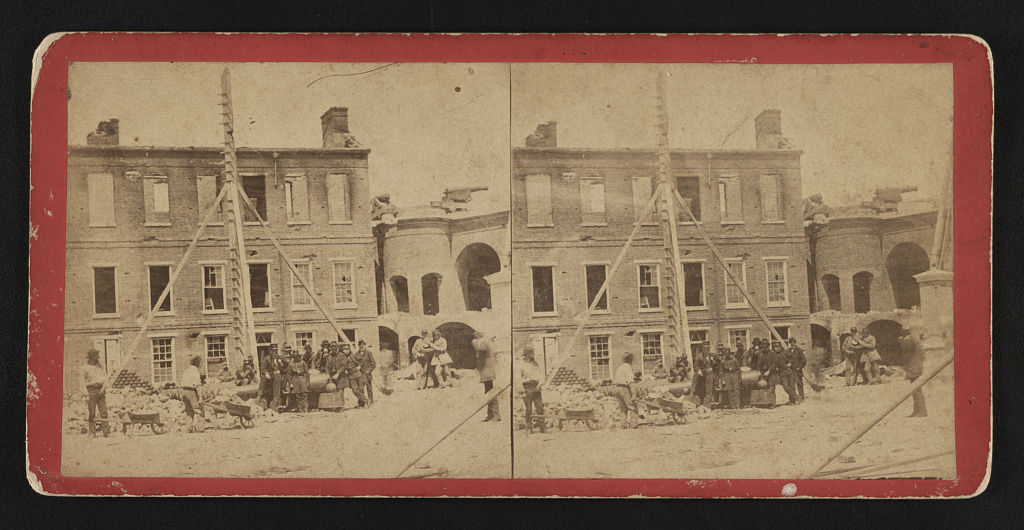
The Left flank

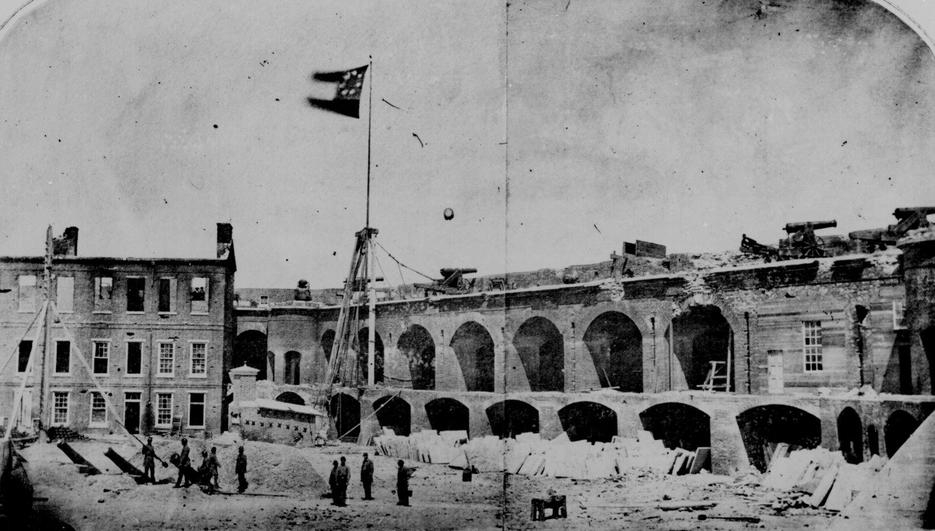
Panormanic View of Left shoulder Angle at left with a 2nd Hot Shot furnace and Left face at right; Ft Sumter 1861; flying the Confederate Flag

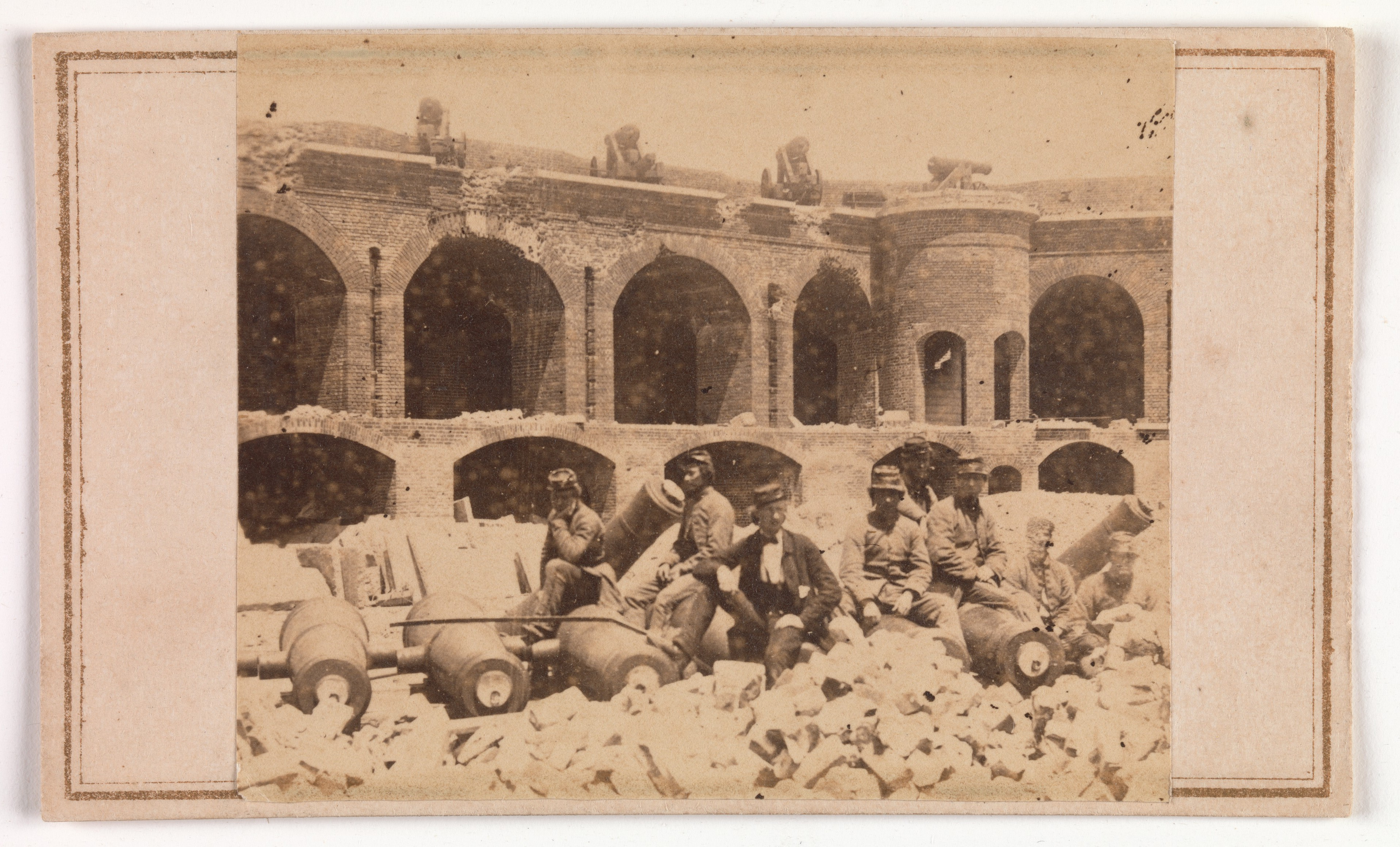
The North west castmates [left angle]. At right can be seen the start of the right angle

== Aftermath ==
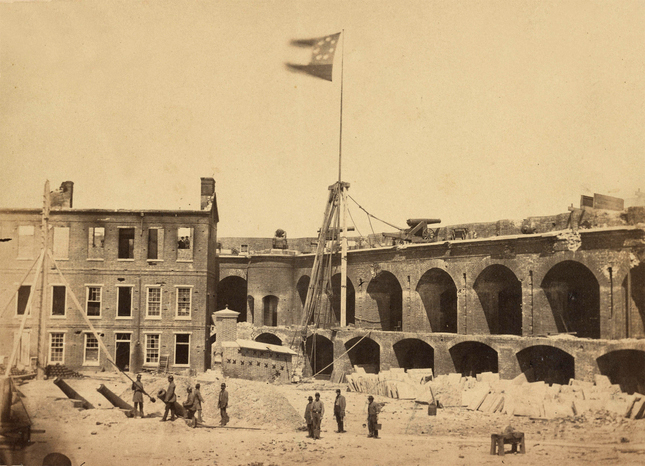
The Confederate Flag flying in Fort Sumter after the 1861 surrender

The bombardment of Fort Sumter was the first military action of the American Civil War. Following the surrender, Northerners rallied behind Lincoln's call for all states to send troops to recapture the forts and preserve the Union. With the scale of the rebellion apparently small so far, Lincoln called for 75,000 volunteers for 90 days. Some Northern states filled their quotas quickly. There were so many volunteers in Ohio that within 16 days they could have met the full call for 75,000 men by themselves.

Other governors from border states were undiplomatic in their responses. For example, Gov. Claiborne Jackson wrote, "Not one man will the state of Missouri furnish to carry on any such unholy crusade", and Gov. Beriah Magoffin wrote, "Kentucky will furnish no troops for the wicked purpose of subduing her sister Southern states." The call for 75,000 troops triggered four additional slave states to declare their secession from the Union and join the Confederacy. The ensuing war lasted four years, effectively ending in April 1865 with the surrender of General Robert E. Lee's Army of Northern Virginia at Appomattox Court House.

Charleston Harbor was completely in Confederate hands for almost the entire four-year duration of the war, leaving a hole in the Union naval blockade. Union forces conducted major operations in 1862 and 1863 to capture Charleston, first overland on James Island (the Battle of Secessionville, June 1862), then by naval assault against Fort Sumter (the First Battle of Charleston Harbor, April 1863), then by seizing the Confederate artillery positions on Morris Island (beginning with the Second Battle of Fort Wagner, July 1863, and followed by a siege until September).

After pounding Sumter to rubble with artillery fire, a final amphibious operation attempted to occupy it (the Second Battle of Fort Sumter, September 1863), but was repulsed and no further attempts were made. The Confederates evacuated Fort Sumter and Charleston in February 1865 as Union Maj. Gen. William T. Sherman outflanked the city in the Carolinas campaign. On April 14, 1865, four years to the day after lowering the Fort Sumter Flag in surrender, Robert Anderson (by then a major general, although ill and in retired status) returned to the ruined fort to raise the flag he had lowered in 1861.

Two of the cannons used at Fort Sumter were later presented to Louisiana State University by General William Tecumseh Sherman, who was president of the university before the war began.

=== Tributes ===
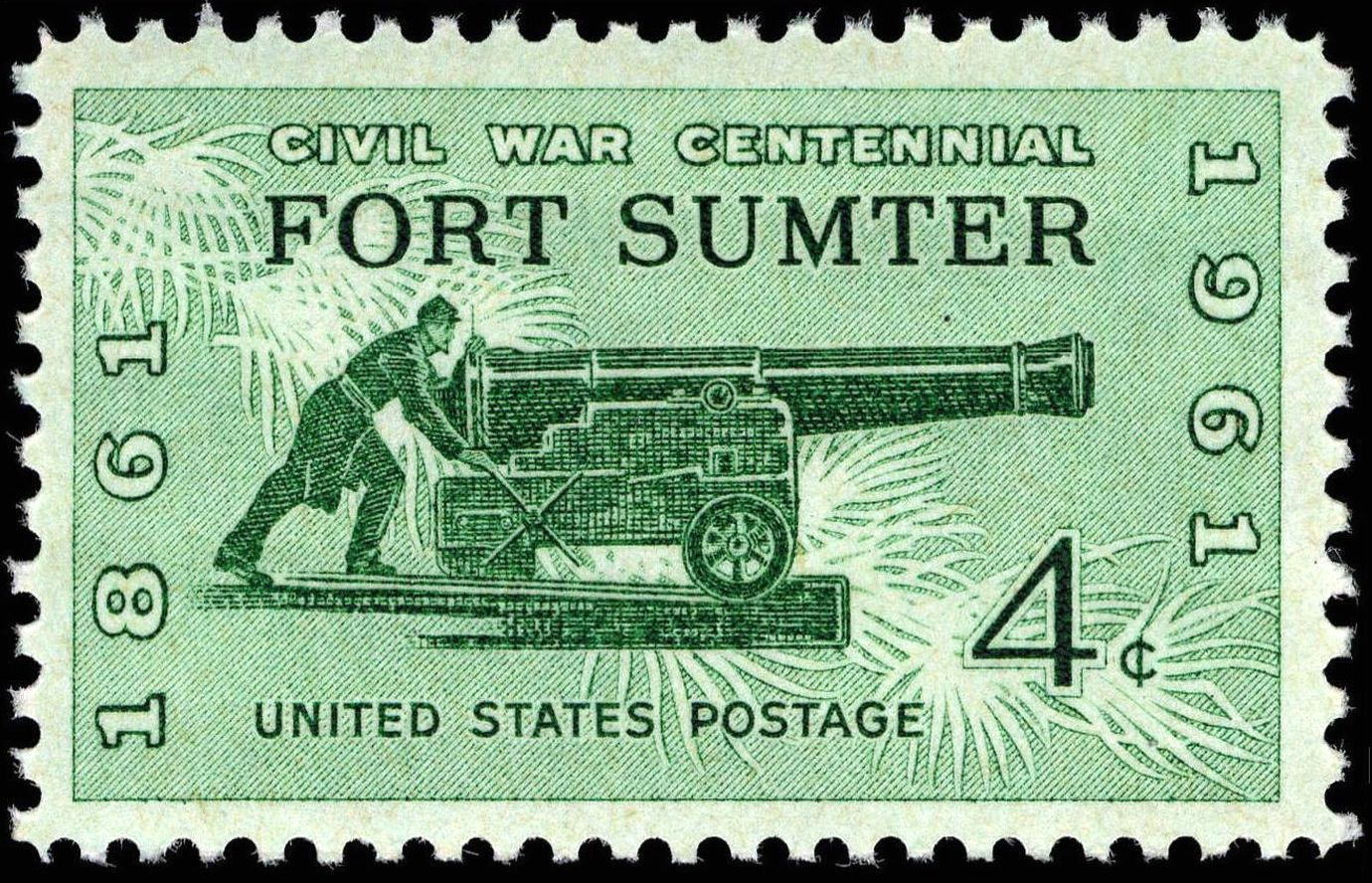
A 1961 Civil War Centennial Issue stamp

The U.S. Post Office Department released the Fort Sumter Centennial issue as the first in the series of five stamps marking the Civil War Centennial on April 12, 1961, at the Charleston post office. The stamp was designed by Charles R. Chickering. It illustrates a seacoast gun from Fort Sumter aimed by an officer in a typical uniform of the time. The background features palmetto leaves akin to bursting shells.

The state tree of South Carolina, the palmettos suggest the geopolitical area opening Civil War hostilities. This stamp was produced by an engraving and printed by the rotary process in panes of fifty stamps each. The Postal Department authorized an initial printing of 120 million stamps.

== Citations ==
=== Sources ===
- Buchanan, James (1911). The Works of James Buchanan: Comprising His Speeches, State Papers, and Private Correspondence. ISBN 9781623767440.
- Burton, E. Milby (1970). The Siege of Charleston 1861–1865. Columbia, SC: University of South Carolina Press. ISBN 978-0-87249-345-2.
- Cooper, William J. (September 11, 2012). We Have the War Upon Us: The Onset of the Civil War, November 1860 – April 1861. New York City, NY: Vintage. ISBN 978-0-307-96088-7.
- Davis, William C. (1983). Brother against Brother: The War Begins. Alexandria, VA: Time-Life Books. ISBN 978-0-8094-4700-8.
- Detzer, David (2001). Allegiance: Fort Sumter, Charleston, and the Beginning of the Civil War. New York City, NY: Harcourt. ISBN 978-0-15-100641-0.
- Eicher, David J. (2001). The Longest Night: A Military History of the Civil War. New York City, NY: Simon & Schuster. ISBN 978-0-684-84944-7.
- Eicher, John H.; Eicher, David J (2001). Civil War High Commands. Stanford, CA, California: Stanford University Press. ISBN 978-0-8047-3641-1.
- Kennedy, Frances H. (1998). The Civil War Battlefield Guide (2 ed.). Boston, MA: Houghton Mifflin Co. ISBN 978-0-395-74012-5.
- McPherson, James M. (1988). Battle Cry of Freedom: The Civil War Era. Oxford History of the United States. New York City, NY: Oxford University Press. ISBN 978-0-19-503863-7.
- Ripley, Warren (1992). Wilcox, Arthur M. (ed.). The Civil War at Charleston (16th ed.). Charleston, SC: Post and Courier. OCLC 636046368.
- Ward, Geoffrey C.; Burns, Ken; Burns, Ric (1990). The Civil War: An Illustrated History. New York City, NY: Knopf. ISBN 978-0-394-56285-8.
- Welcher, Frank J. (1989). The Union Army, 1861–1865 Organization and Operations. Vol. 1, The Eastern Theater. Bloomington, ID: Indiana University Press. ISBN 978-0-253-36453-1.
