= Austria at the 2016 Summer Olympics =

- IOC code: AUT
- NOC: Austrian Olympic Committee
- Website: www.olympia.at (in German)

in Rio de Janeiro
- Competitors: 71 in 22 sports
- Flag bearers: Liu Jia (opening); Thomas Zajac & Tanja Frank (closing)
- Medals Ranked 78th: Gold 0 Silver 0 Bronze 1 Total 1

Summer Olympics appearances (overview)
- 1896; 1900; 1904; 1908; 1912; 1920; 1924; 1928; 1932; 1936; 1948; 1952; 1956; 1960; 1964; 1968; 1972; 1976; 1980; 1984; 1988; 1992; 1996; 2000; 2004; 2008; 2012; 2016; 2020; 2024

Other related appearances
- 1906 Intercalated Games

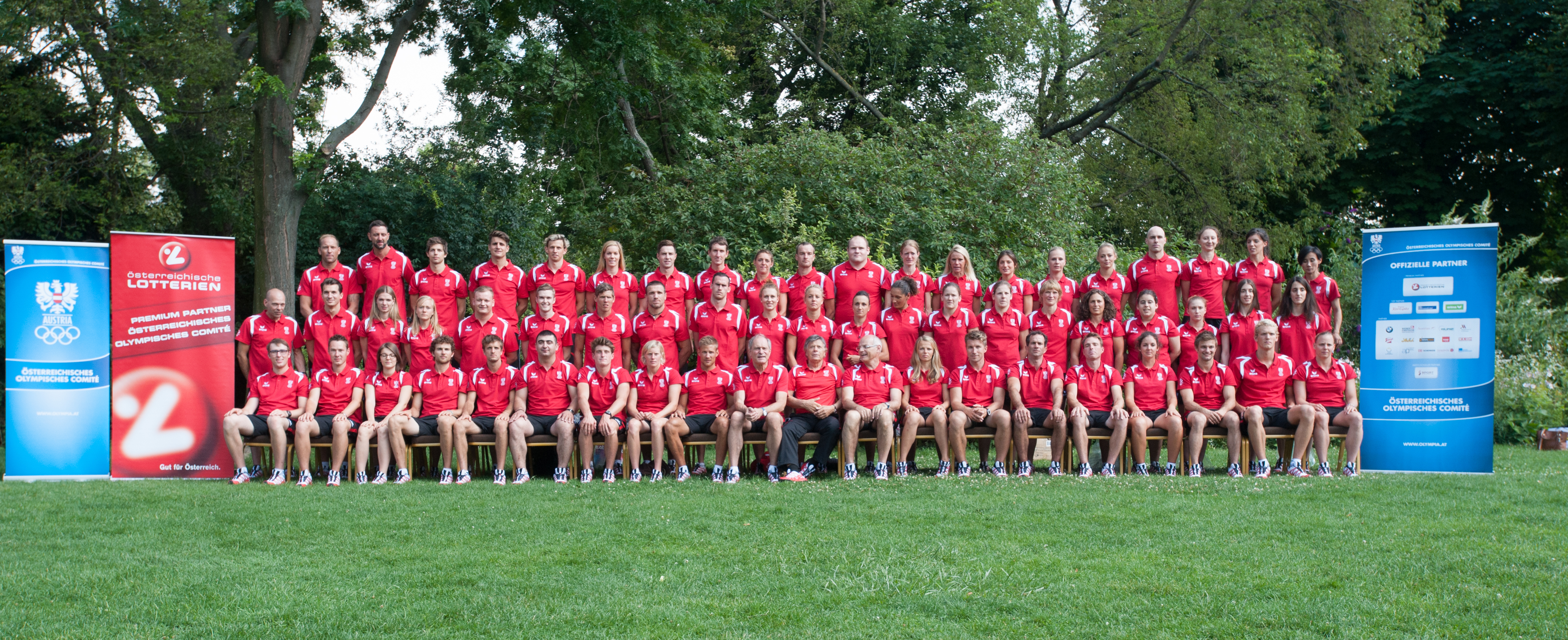
Austrian athletes for the 2016 Summer Olympics

Austria competed at the 2016 Summer Olympics in Rio de Janeiro, Brazil, from 5 to 21 August 2016. It was the nation's twenty-seventh appearance at the Summer Olympics. Austrian athletes have appeared in every edition of the Summer Olympic Games, with the exception of the 1920 Summer Olympics in Antwerp. The Austrian Olympic Committee (German: Österreichisches Olympisches Comité, ÖOC) confirmed a squad of 71 athletes, 37 men and 34 women, to compete across 22 sports at the Games. The nation's full roster had one more participant than the previous two Games.

The Austrian roster featured 29 returning Olympians, with Chinese-born table tennis player Liu Jia, the nation's flag bearer in the opening ceremony, leading them as the only competitor going to her fifth consecutive Games. Apart from Liu, judoka and Beijing 2008 silver medalist Ludwig Paischer, dressage rider Victoria Max-Theurer, and skiff duo Nico Delle-Karth and Nikolaus Resch in the 49er class also topped the roster lineup to make their fourth Olympic appearance. Other notable Austrian athletes included world-ranked sailor Lara Vadlau and her Polish-born partner Jolanta Ogar in the women's 470, London 2012 sixth-place finalist Corinna Kuhnle in slalom kayaking, and twin sisters Anna-Maria and Eirini Alexandri.

Austria left Rio de Janeiro with only a bronze medal, won by sailing duo of Thomas Zajac and Tanja Frank in the Nacra 17 class, avoiding an empty-handed return as had happened at the previous London 2012 Olympics. Slalom canoeist Corinna Kuhnle, rifle shooter Olivia Hofmann, discus thrower Lukas Weißhaidinger, and rower Magdalena Lobnig (sixth, women's single sculls) were among the Austrian athletes progressing to the finals of their respective sporting events, but came closest to the nation's medal haul.

== Background ==
Austria participated in twenty-seven Summer Olympics between its debut at the 1896 Summer Olympics in Athens, Greece, and the 2016 Summer Olympics in Rio de Janeiro, Brazil. The nation chose table tennis player Liu Jia as its flagbearer in the opening ceremony and the sailing duo of Thomas Zajac and Tanja Frank for the closing ceremony. They were one of the three nations who used more than one person to bear the flag in the closing ceremony. A delegation of 71 athletes, 37 men and 34 women, travelled to Rio de Janeiro and competed across 22 sports. Among the sports represented by its athletes, Austria marked its Olympic debut in golf (new to the 2016 Games), as well as its return to diving after 8 years, rowing and weightlifting after 12 years, and archery after 32 years. Austrian athletes have won a total of 86 medals at the Summer Olympic Games.

== Medalists ==
| Medal | Name | Sport | Event | Date |
|---|---|---|---|---|
| Bronze | Thomas Zajac; Tanja Frank | Sailing | Nacra 17 | 16 August |

== Archery ==
Laurence Baldauff qualified for the women's individual recurve by obtaining one of the eight Olympic places available from the 2015 World Archery Championships in Copenhagen, Denmark. Each match consisted of up to 5 sets of 3 arrows per archer. The archer with the best score in each set won the set, earning 2 points. If the score was tied, each archer received 1 point. She achieved a score of 619 to seal a forty-first seed in the ranking round. Baldauff was eliminated in the round of 64 by Bombayla Devi Laishram of India.

| Athlete | Event | Ranking round | | Round of 64 | Round of 32 | Round of 16 | Quarterfinals | Semifinals | Final / BM | |
| Athlete | Event | Score | Seed | Opposition Score | Opposition Score | Opposition Score | Opposition Score | Opposition Score | Opposition Score | Rank |
|---|---|---|---|---|---|---|---|---|---|---|
| Laurence Baldauff | Women's individual | 619 | 41 | Devi (IND); L 2–6 | Did not advance | | | | | |

== Athletics ==
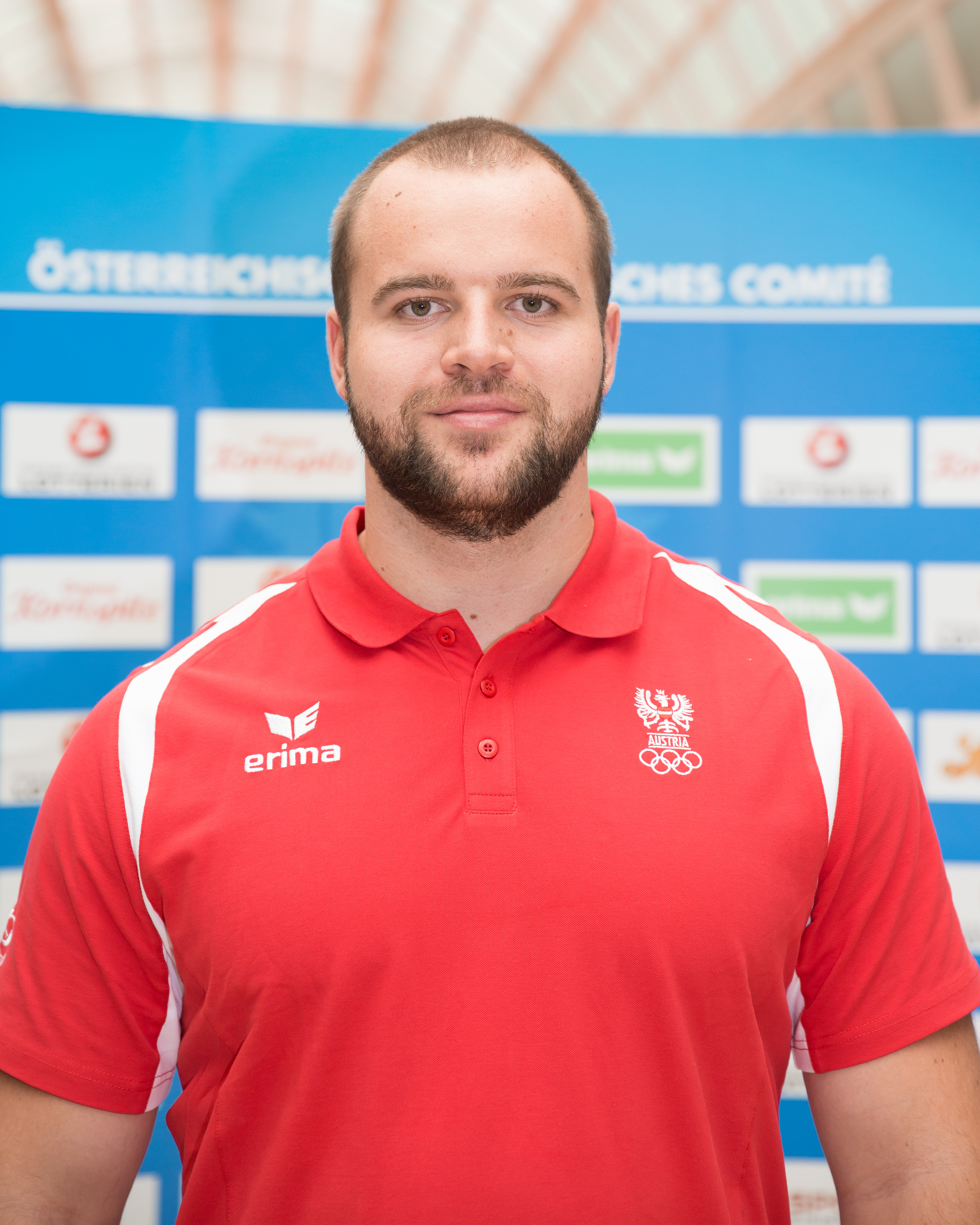
Lukas Weißhaidinger at the hand-out of the Austrian team's official attire for the 2016 Summer Olympics

Austrian athletes have so far achieved qualifying standards in the following athletics events (up to a maximum of 3 athletes in each event):

Key

- Note–Ranks given for track events are within the athlete's heat only
- Q = Qualified for the next round
- q = Qualified for the next round as a fastest loser or, in field events, by position without achieving the qualifying target
- NR = National record
- N/A = Round not applicable for the event
- Bye = Athlete not required to compete in round

Track & road events

| Athlete | Event | Heat | | Semifinal | | Final | |
| Athlete | Event | Result | Rank | Result | Rank | Result | Rank |
|---|---|---|---|---|---|---|---|
| Andrea Mayr | Women's marathon | — | | | | 2:41:52 | 64 |
| Beate Schrott | Women's 100 m hurdles | 13.47 | 8 | Did not advance | | | |
| Jennifer Wenth | Women's 5000 m | 16:07.02 | 14 q | — | | 15:56.11 | 16 |

Field events

| Athlete | Event | Qualification | | Final | |
| Athlete | Event | Distance | Position | Distance | Position |
|---|---|---|---|---|---|
| Lukas Weißhaidinger | Men's discus throw | 65.86 | 2 Q | 64.95 | 6 |

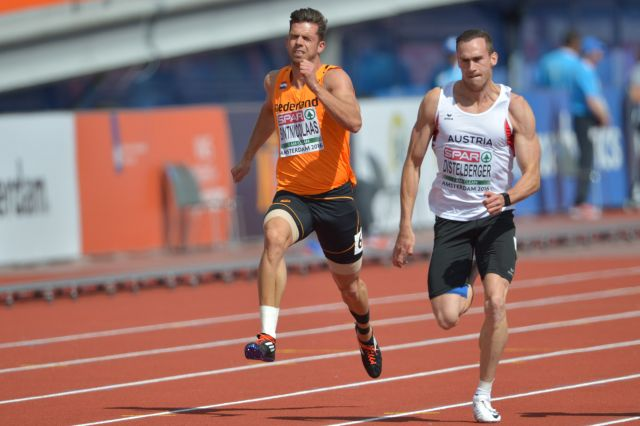
Dominik Distelberger (right) racing against Eelco Sintnicolaas (left) in the 2016 European Athletics Championships

Combined events – Men's decathlon

| Athlete | Event | 100 m | LJ | SP | HJ | 400 m | 110H | DT | PV | JT | 1500 m | Final | Rank |
|---|---|---|---|---|---|---|---|---|---|---|---|---|---|
| Dominik Distelberger | Result | 10.84 | 7.33 | 13.40 | 1.89 | 48.61 | 14.39 | 38.09 | 4.80 | 61.83 | 4:33.47 | 7954 | 19 |
| Dominik Distelberger | Points | 897 | 893 | 692 | 705 | 880 | 925 | 626 | 849 | 765 | 722 | 7954 | 19 |

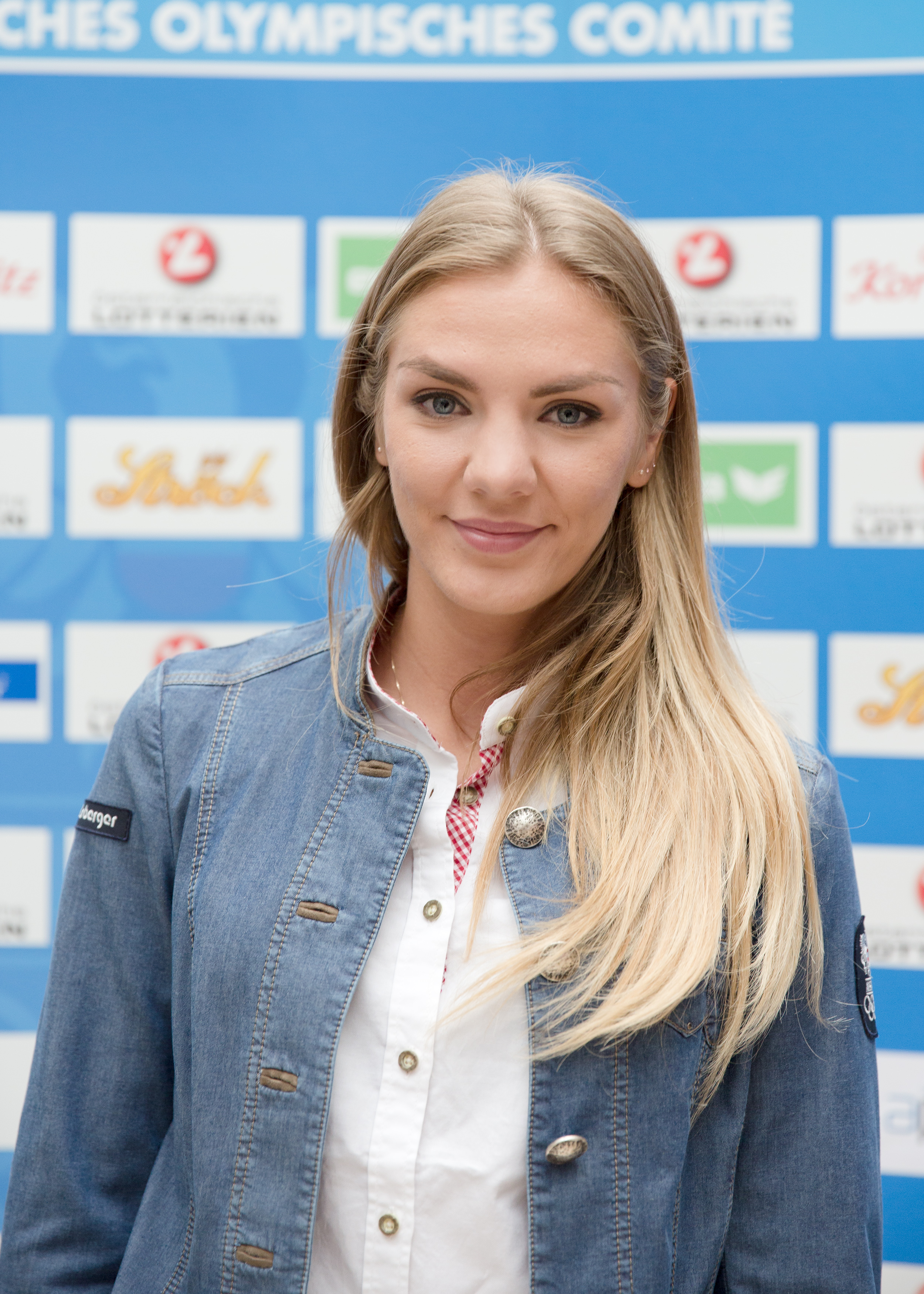
Ivona Dadic at the hand-out of the Austrian team's official attire for the 2016 Summer Olympics

Combined events – Women's heptathlon

| Athlete | Event | 100H | HJ | SP | 200 m | LJ | JT | 800 m | Final | Rank |
|---|---|---|---|---|---|---|---|---|---|---|
| Ivona Dadic | Result | 13.81 | 1.77 | 13.43 | 24.60 | 6.05 | 46.08 | 2:15.64 | 6155 | 21 |
| Ivona Dadic | Points | 1001 | 941 | 756 | 924 | 865 | 784 | 884 | 6155 | 21 |

== Badminton ==
Austria has qualified two badminton players for each of the following events into the Olympic tournament. Elisabeth Baldauf was selected among the top 34 individual shuttlers in the women's singles based on the BWF World Rankings as of 5 May 2016, while David Obernorsterer picked up one of the spare athlete berths from the doubles as the next highest-ranked eligible player in the men's singles. The duo, which frequently plays together in international open events, both made their individual Olympic debut. Both of them lost all their games and came last in their groups. Obernosterer competed in group E of the men's singles event together with Lin Dan, Vladimir Malkov, and Nguyễn Tiến Minh. His first game was against Lin. Lin has previously won two gold medals in the 2012 Olympics and 2008 Olympics. On 11 August, Obernosterer lost the first set 5–21 and the second 11–21. The following day, he lost 18–21 and 14–21 against Minh. Finally, on 14 August, he lost 11–21 and 10–21 to Malkov. He failed to qualify for the round of 16.

Meanwhile, Elisabeth Baldauf was in group N of the women's singles along with Tai Tzu-ying and Natalia Perminova. She lost her first game on 11 August against Tai 11–21 in the first set and 9–21 in the second. Two days later, she lost her second and final game against Perminova 17–21 and 8–21. Tai ended up qualifying for the elimination round by beating Perminova 21-12 and 21-9 but was then eliminated by Pusarla Sindhu who later won the silver medal.

| Athlete | Event | Group stage | | | | Elimination | Quarterfinal | Semifinal | Final / BM | |
| Athlete | Event | Opposition Score | Opposition Score | Opposition Score | Rank | Opposition Score | Opposition Score | Opposition Score | Opposition Score | Rank |
|---|---|---|---|---|---|---|---|---|---|---|
| David Obernosterer | Men's singles | Lin D (CHN); L (5–21, 11–21) | Nguyễn T M (VIE); L (18–21, 14–21) | Malkov (RUS); L (11–21, 10–21) | 4 | Did not advance | | | | |
| Elisabeth Baldauf | Women's singles | Tai T-y (TPE); L (11–21, 9–21) | Perminova (RUS); L (17–21, 8–21) | — | 3 | Did not advance | | | | |

== Canoeing ==
=== Slalom ===
For the K-1 slalom events, 21 boats qualified for the heats. The 15 best times from the two runs in the heats qualified for the semifinals, and then the best 10 boats from the semifinals qualified for the finals. Austrian canoeists have qualified a maximum of one boat in each of the following classes through the 2015 ICF Canoe Slalom World Championships. London 2012 sixth-place finalist Corinna Kuhnle (women's K-1) and rookie Mario Leitner (men's K-1) were named to the Austrian roster on 20 June 2016. Mario Leitner finished his first run in the men's kayaking event in 93.29 seconds and his second run with a worse time of 93.89 seconds. He finished in the fifteenth allotted position, thus qualifying for the semifinals. However, he finished fifteenth with a time of 100.25 seconds, missing out the finals by a 4.57-second deficit. Meanwhile, Corinna Kuhnle finished her first run with a time of 109.63 seconds and her second in 107.02 seconds, placing twelfth overall and making her way to the semifinals. In the semifinals, she finished with her best time of the event with 101.54 seconds, which ranked her first in the semifinals. She could not match that time and came fifth in 104.75 seconds, missing the podium by 2.26 seconds.

| Athlete | Event | Preliminary | | | | | | Semifinal | | Final | |
| Athlete | Event | Run 1 | Rank | Run 2 | Rank | Best | Rank | Time | Rank | Time | Rank |
|---|---|---|---|---|---|---|---|---|---|---|---|
| Mario Leitner | Men's K-1 | 93.29 | 12 | 93.89 | 13 | 93.29 | 15 Q | 100.25 | 13 | Did not advance | |
| Corinna Kuhnle | Women's K-1 | 109.63 | 9 | 107.02 | 10 | 107.02 | 12 Q | 101.54 | 1 Q | 104.75 | 5 |

=== Sprint ===
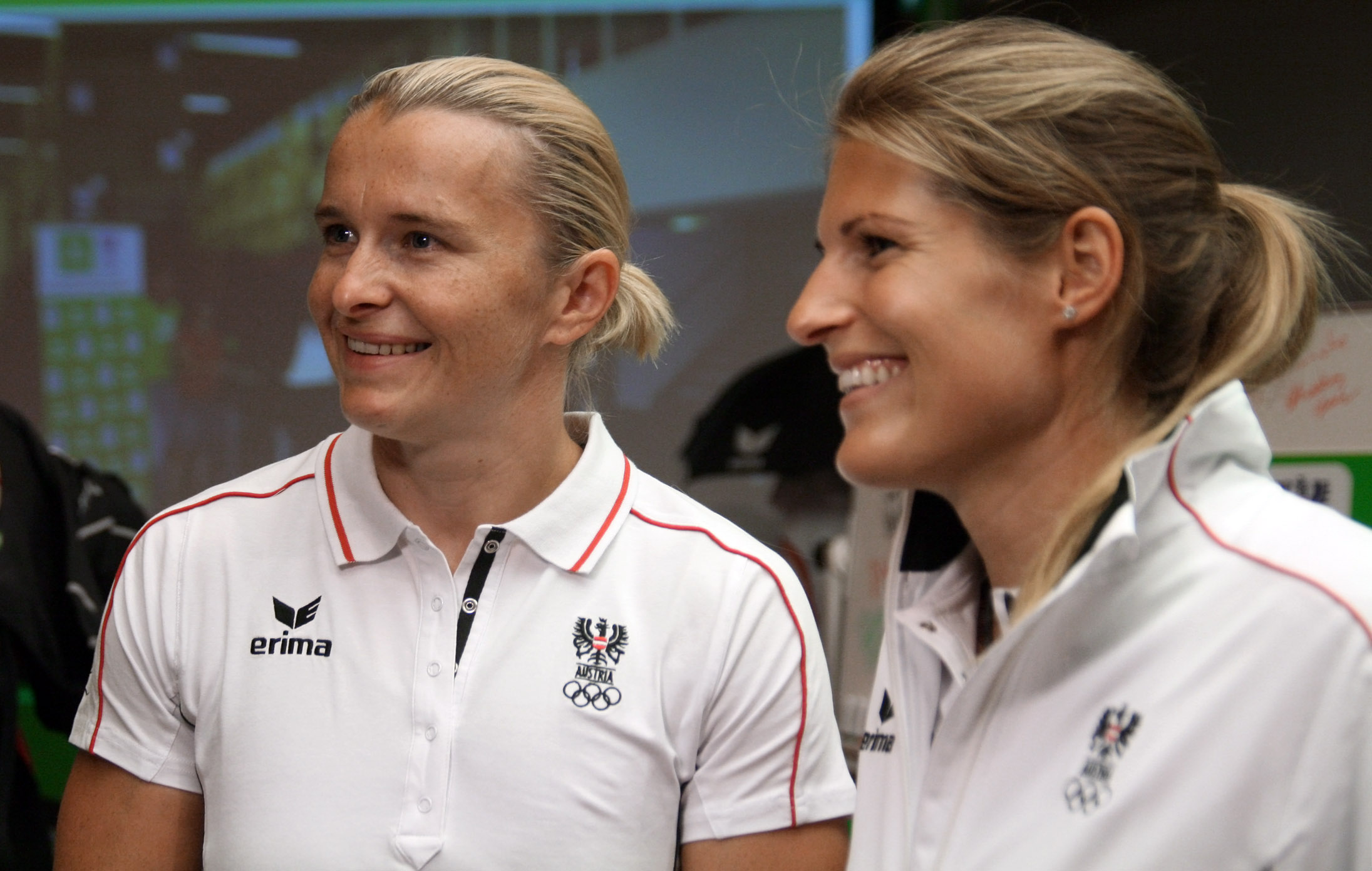
Viktoria Schwarz and Yvonne Schuring at the hand-out of the official attire for the 2012 Summer Olympics

Austria has received a spare berths from the International Canoe Federation to enter two boats each in the women's K-1 200 m and the women's K-2 500 m to the Olympics, as the next highest-ranked nation, not yet qualified, at the 2015 Canoe Sprint World Championships, and as a response to the forfeiture of five boats held by the Russians due to their previous doping bans and their implications in the "disappearing positive methodology" set out in the McClaren Report on Russia's state-sponsored doping. Two-time Olympic kayakers Yvonne Schuring and Viktoria Schwarz, along with rookie Ana Roxana Lehaci, were named to the Austrian roster on 27 July 2016. Viktoria Schwarz participated in the K-1 200 metres. In the heats, she finished fifth in 42.847 seconds, qualifying for the semifinals. Rounding off her semifinal heat with a seventh-place time in 43.072, Schwarz was ineligible to compete in any of the final rounds.

Lehaci and Schuring participated in the K-2 500 metres, finishing sixth with a time of 1:46.429 minutes and automatically qualified for the semifinals. If they would have finished first, they would have automatically qualified for the A finals. They finished fourth behind Alyssa Bull and Alyce Burnett of Australia, failing to qualify for the A final. The Austrian duos' time was 1:44.462 minutes and the Australians' was 1:44.290. In the B final, they finished third in 1:48.834 minutes, ranking eleventh overall.

| Athlete | Event | Heats | | Semifinals | | Final | |
| Athlete | Event | Time | Rank | Time | Rank | Time | Rank |
|---|---|---|---|---|---|---|---|
| Viktoria Schwarz | Women's K-1 200 m | 42.847 | 5 Q | 43.072 | 7 | Did not advance | |
| Ana Roxana Lehaci; Yvonne Schuring | Women's K-2 500 m | 1:46.429 | 6 Q | 1:44.462 | 4 FB | 1:48.834 | 11 |

Qualification Legend: FA = Qualify to final (medal); FB = Qualify to final B (non-medal)

== Cycling ==
=== Road ===
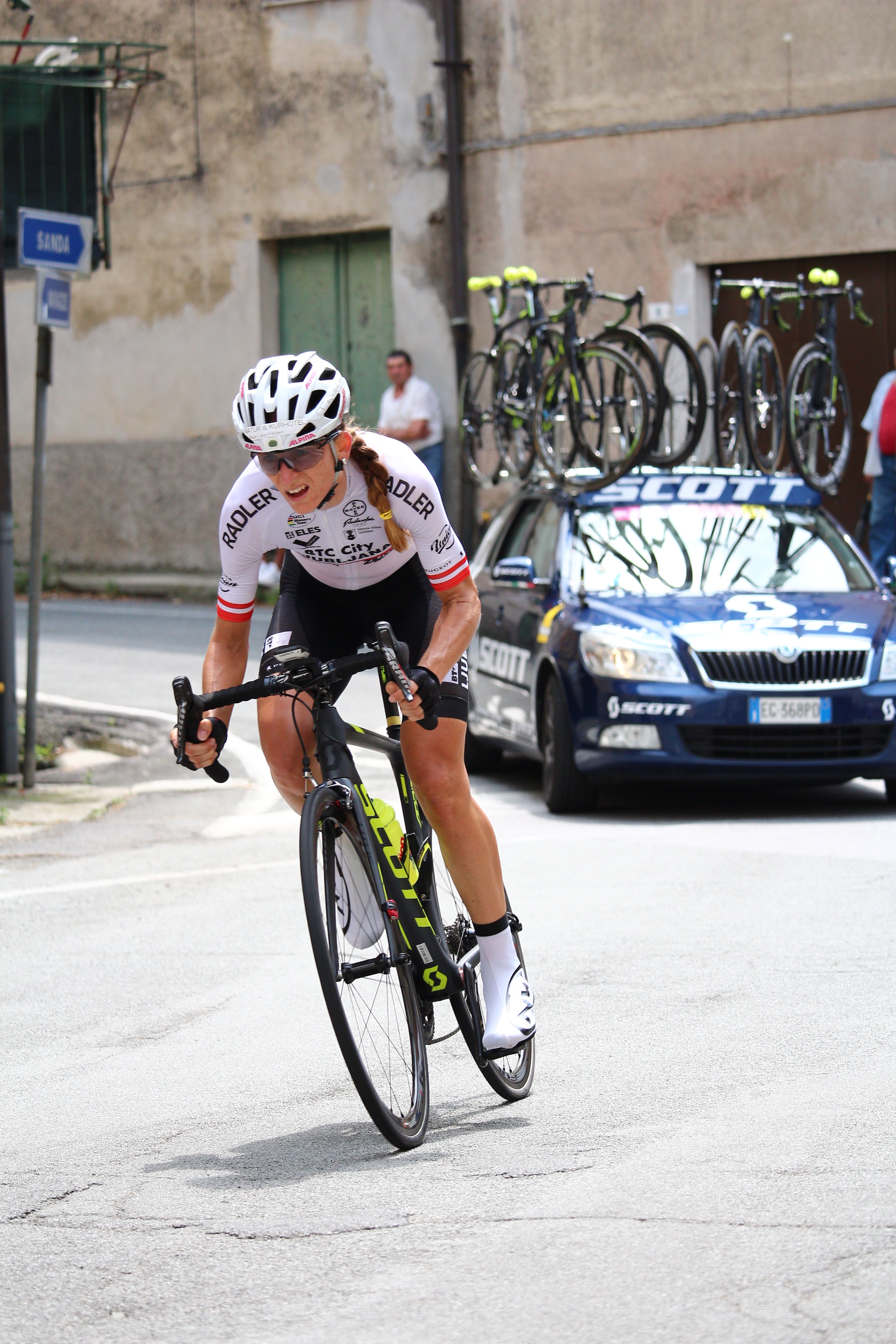
Martina Ritter during the Giro Rosa 2016

Austrian riders qualified for a maximum of two quota places in the men's Olympic road race by virtue of their top 15 final national ranking in the 2015 UCI Europe Tour. One additional spot was awarded to the Austrian cyclist in the women's road race by virtue of her top 100 individual placement in the 2016 UCI World Rankings. The entire road cycling squad was named to the Austrian roster for the Games on 12 July 2016. Stefan Denifl and Georg Preidler both competed in the men's individual road race, with the former failing to finish and the latter placing 44th with a time of 6:29.42. The pair were later implicated in a blood doping scandal, with Denifl in particular being accused of doping in a timeframe including the Olympics. Priedler fared better four days later at the men's individual time trial, finishing 16th out of 35 starting riders with a time of 1:16:02.36. Martina Ritter, who won the Austrian National Time Trial Championships two months earlier, competed in the women's individual road race. According to Ritter, she fell and hit her ribs in the second lap, which led her to struggle in the last climb. She finished in 46th place with a time of 4:02:07.

| Athlete | Event | Time | Rank |
|---|---|---|---|
| Stefan Denifl | Men's road race | Did not finish | |
| Georg Preidler | Men's road race | 6:29:42 | 44 |
| Georg Preidler | Men's time trial | 1:16:02.36 | 16 |
| Martina Ritter | Women's road race | 4:02:07 | 46 |

=== Mountain biking ===
Austria qualified one mountain biker for the men's Olympic cross-country race, as a result of his nation's fourteenth-place finish in the UCI Olympic Ranking List of 25 May 2016. London 2012 Olympian Alexander Gehbauer was named to the Austrian roster for the Games on 10 July 2016. Gehbauer fell headfirst while going down a steep rocky descent, losing consciousness and ending up bloodied with multiple bruises. He fractured his metacarpal bone and withdrew to a hospital for treatment.

| Athlete | Event | Time | Rank |
|---|---|---|---|
| Alexander Gehbauer | Men's cross-country | Did not finish | |

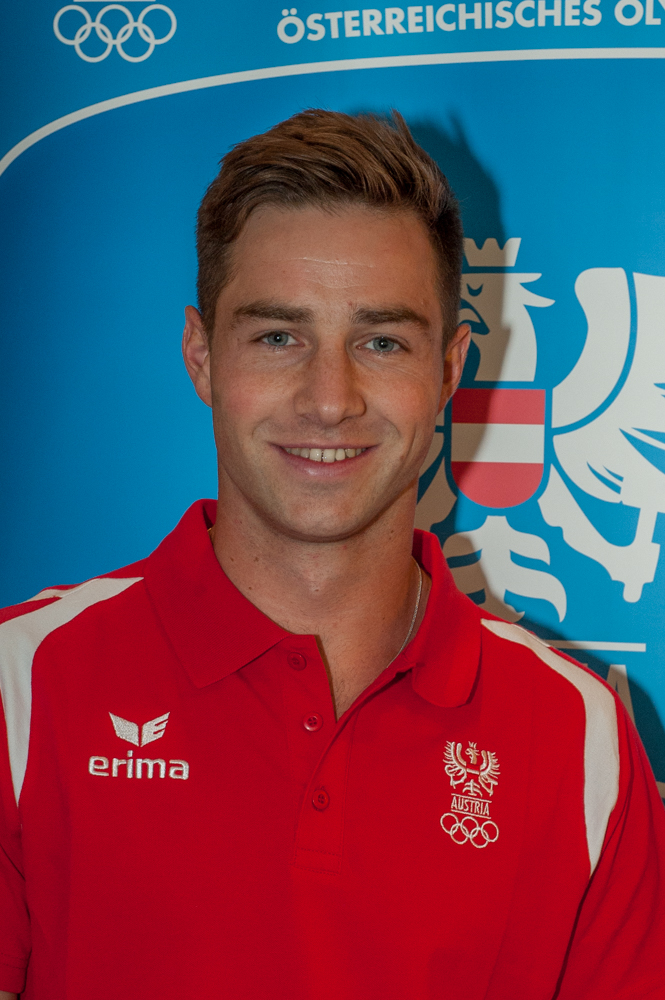
Constantin Blaha at the hand-out of the official attire for the 2016 Summer Olympics

== Diving ==
Austria received an invitation from FINA to send a diver competing in the men's individual springboard to the Olympics, based on his results at the 2016 FINA World Cup series. Constantin Blaha was chosen to compete in the men's 3-metre springboard event. He previously competed in the men's 3m springboard event of the 2008 Summer Olympics in Beijing, China. He was awarded a total of 351.95 points over six dives. He ranked 27th and failed to qualify for the semifinals. He also did not qualify for the semifinals in Beijing, placing 22nd.

| Athlete | Event | Preliminaries | | Semifinals | | Final | |
| Athlete | Event | Points | Rank | Points | Rank | Points | Rank |
|---|---|---|---|---|---|---|---|
| Constantin Blaha | Men's 3 m springboard | 351.95 | 27 | Did not advance | | | |

== Equestrian ==
Austria entered one equestrian into the competition by virtue of a top two finish from South Western Europe in the individual FEI Olympic rankings. Dressage rider veteran Victoria Max-Theurer was chosen to participate. Max-Theurer has previously participated in the 2004 Athens Olympics, 2008 Beijing Olympics, and the 2012 London Olympics. She made the Grand Prix Special in both 2004 and 2012, but did not qualify for it in 2008. She rode Della Cavalleria instead of her usual horse Blind Date. On 11 August, Max-Theurer appeared in the Grand Prix and ranked thirty-third with a score of 71.129. She failed to advance to the Grand Prix Special and Freestyle.

=== Dressage ===
| Athlete | Horse | Event | Grand Prix | | Grand Prix Special | | Grand Prix Freestyle | | Overall | |
| Athlete | Horse | Event | Score | Rank | Score | Rank | Technical | Artistic | Score | Rank |
|---|---|---|---|---|---|---|---|---|---|---|
| Victoria Max-Theurer | Della Cavalleria | Individual | 71.129 | 33 | Did not advance | | | | | |

== Fencing ==
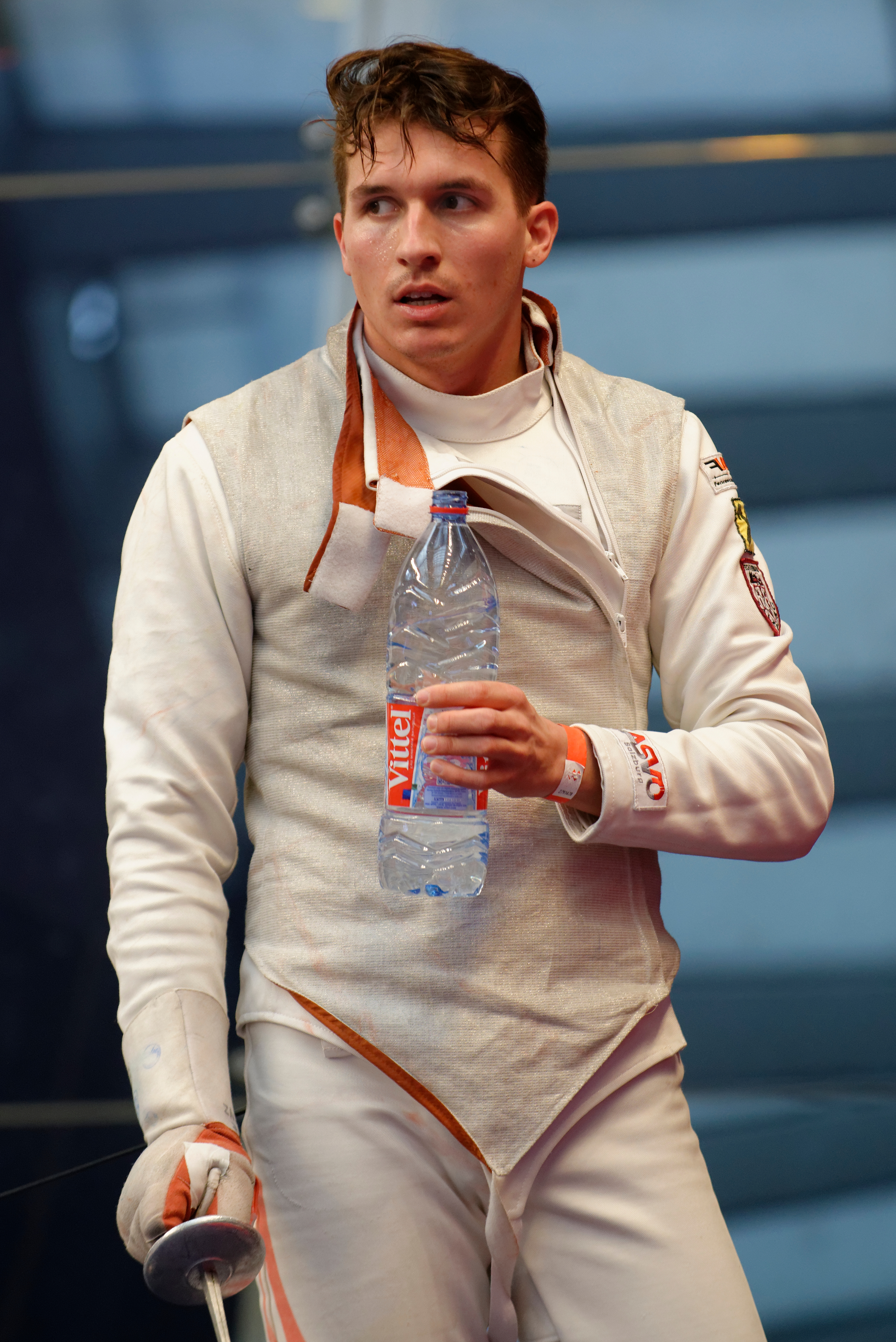
René Pranz during his T64 bout against Rostyslav Hertsyk at the Challenge International de Paris (men's foil World Cup).

Austria has entered one fencer into the Olympic competition. This was Austria's third appearance in the sport in a row. René Pranz had claimed his Olympic spot as the sole winner of the men's foil at the European Zonal Qualifier in Prague, Czech Republic. He played in a round of 64 game against returning Olympian Guilherme Toldo of Brazil and lost in an exciting 14–15 scoreline. Toldo went on to the quarter-finals before being defeated by Daniele Garozzo, who later won the gold medal.

| Athlete | Event | Round of 64 | Round of 32 | Round of 16 | Quarterfinal | Semifinal | Final / BM | |
| Athlete | Event | Opposition Score | Opposition Score | Opposition Score | Opposition Score | Opposition Score | Opposition Score | Rank |
|---|---|---|---|---|---|---|---|---|
| René Pranz | Men's foil | Toldo (BRA); L14–15 | Did not advance | | | | | |

== Golf ==
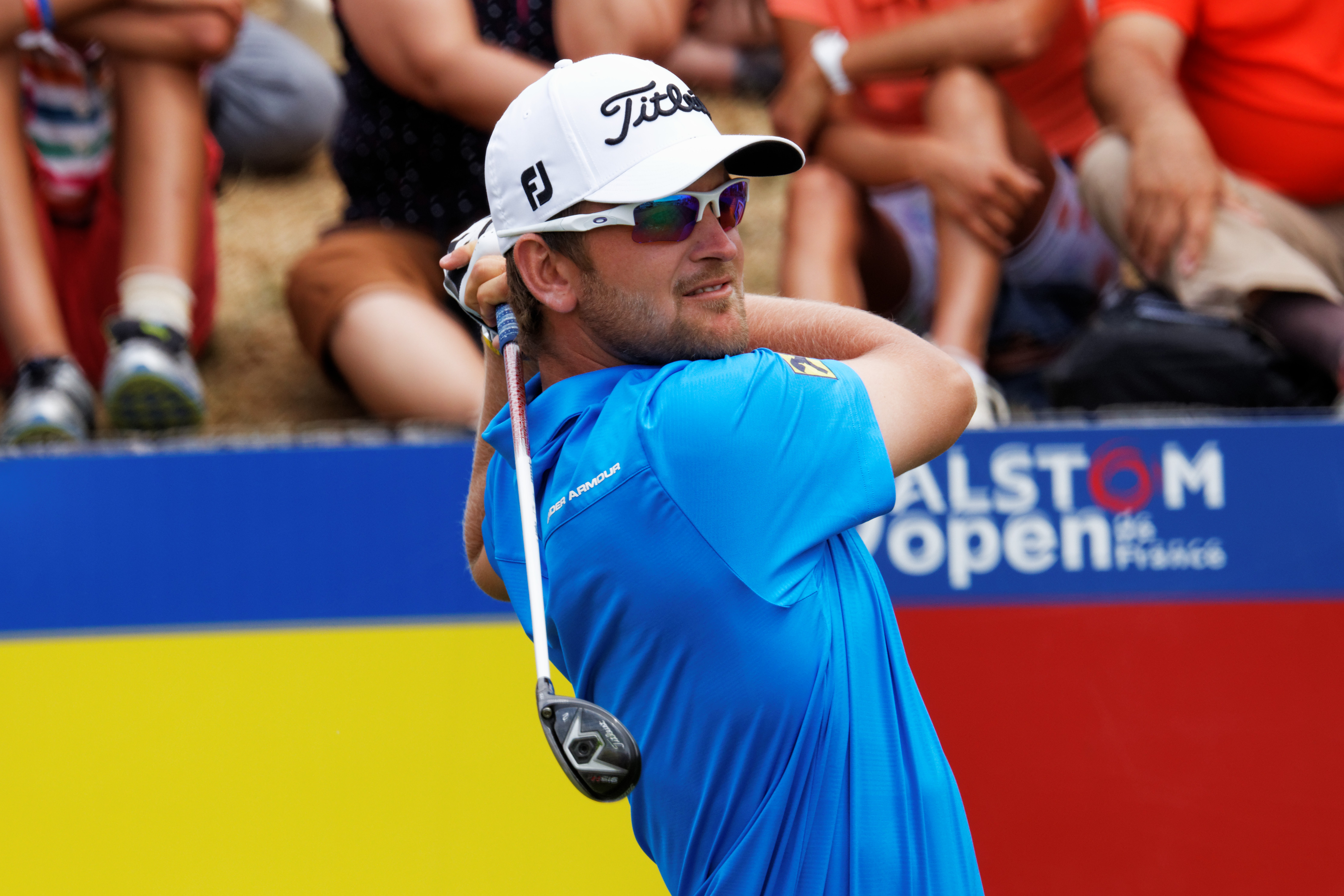
Bernd Wiesberger at the Open de France in 2015

Austria has entered two golfers into the Olympic tournament. Bernd Wiesberger (world no. 51) and Christine Wolf (world no. 317) qualified directly among the top 60 eligible players for their respective individual events based on the IGF World Rankings as of 11 July 2016. In the first round of the men's event, Bernd Wiesberger finished three over par with 74. He was tied for fiftieth with 5 other competitors. He improved in the second round, jumping up 28 spots to the twenty-second position, tying with eight other golfers. His score for the round was four under par, 67. At the end of the round, his total was 141. The third round took place on 13 August. Wiesberger had a score of 69 for the round, two under par. The round ascended him by 8 ranks, making him tied for fourteenth with a score of 210. On the fourth and final round, he had a score of 68, three under par. His final ranking was tied for eleventh with a score of 270, six under par.

In the women's golfing event, Christine Wolf achieved a score of 71, meeting par and placing twenty-sixth for the round. The second round was her best one scorewise, in which she achieved a score of 69, two under par, but still dropped two places. She had a big drop in the third round with a score of 77, six over par. The round resulted in her dropping 11 spaces, ending with a tie with Carlota Ciganda of Spain. In the final round, Wolf nearly matched her previous performance, but improved by 1, achieving a score of 76. Her final score was 293 scores, nine over par. She ranked 43rd overall.

| Athlete | Event | Round 1 | Round 2 | Round 3 | Round 4 | Total | | |
| Athlete | Event | Score | Score | Score | Score | Score | Par | Rank |
|---|---|---|---|---|---|---|---|---|
| Bernd Wiesberger | Men's | 74 | 67 | 69 | 68 | 278 | −6 | =11 |
| Christine Wolf | Women's | 71 | 69 | 77 | 76 | 293 | +9 | 43 |

== Gymnastics ==
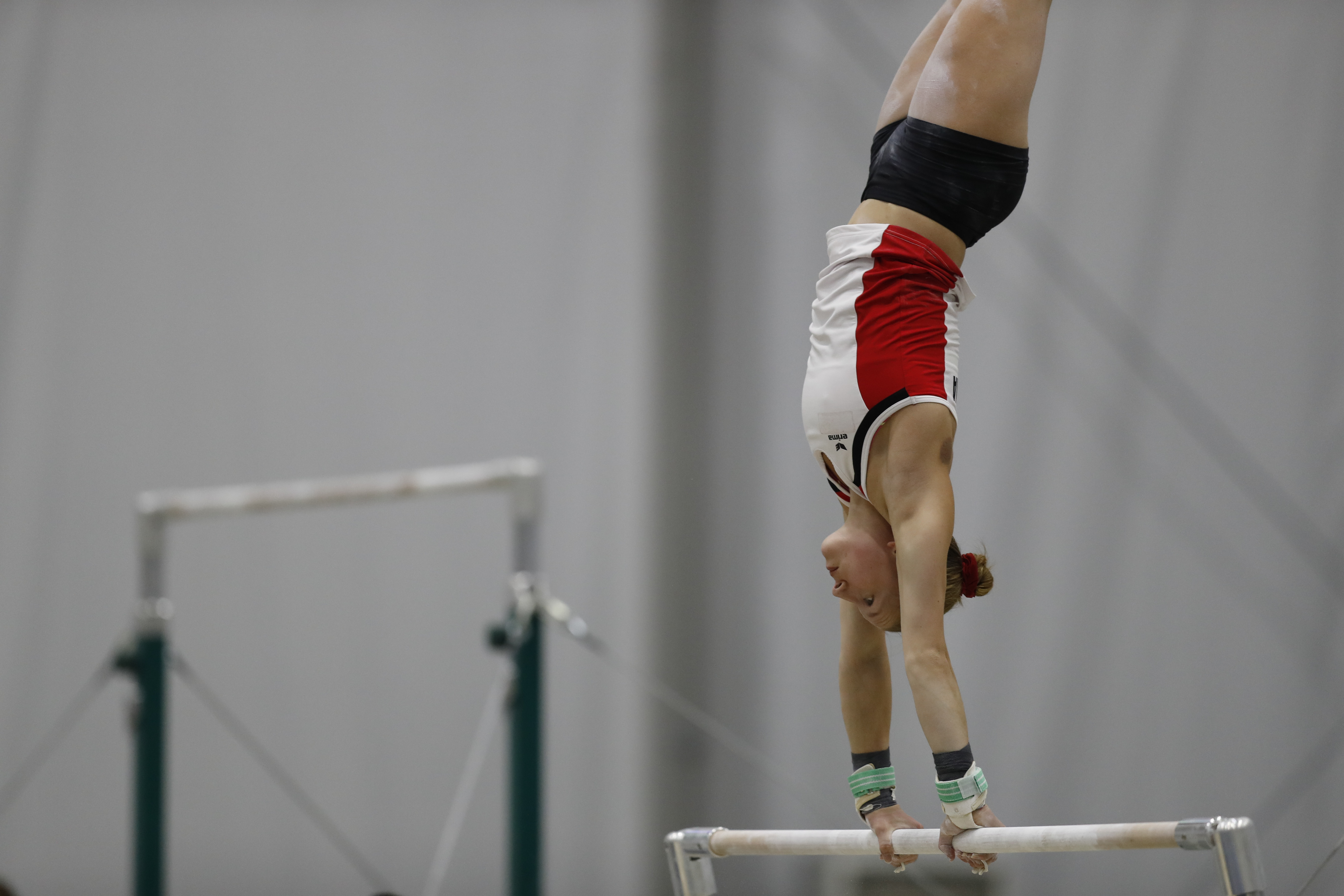
Lisa Ecker training in Rio de Janeiro for the Olympic Games.

=== Artistic ===
Austria has entered one artistic gymnast into the Olympic competition. Lisa Ecker had claimed her Olympic spot in the women's apparatus and all-around events at the Olympic Test Event in Rio de Janeiro. Once it was announced she made the event, she thanked her trainer Johanna Gratt. Ecker said that "[Gratt] put everything together perfectly and gotten the best out of her. Now my dream of being in the Olympic Games is coming true." She had a total score of 52.966 in the qualification round, finishing forty-third and failing to qualify for the finals.

| Athlete | Event | Qualification | | | | | | Final | | | | | |
| Athlete | Event | Apparatus | | | | Total | Rank | Apparatus | | | | Total | Rank |
| Athlete | Event | V | UB | BB | F | Total | Rank | V | UB | BB | F | Total | Rank |
|---|---|---|---|---|---|---|---|---|---|---|---|---|---|
| Lisa Ecker | All-around | 14.100 | 12.200 | 13.400 | 13.266 | 52.966 | 43 | Did not advance | | | | | |

=== Rhythmic ===
Austria has qualified one rhythmic gymnast in the individual all-around for the Games by claiming one of eight available Olympic spots at the Olympic Test Event in Rio de Janeiro. She was awarded 16.833 points for the hoop section and 16.666 for the ball section. Her best score was the juggling clubs section, in which she received 17.166 points. Ruprecht had 17.166 points for the final section, which was the ribbon. In total, she placed twentieth with 69.698 points, thus not qualifying for the finals.

| Athlete | Event | Qualification | | | | | | Final | | | | | |
| Athlete | Event | Hoop | Ball | Clubs | Ribbon | Total | Rank | Hoop | Ball | Clubs | Ribbon | Total | Rank |
|---|---|---|---|---|---|---|---|---|---|---|---|---|---|
| Nicol Ruprecht | Individual | 16.833 | 16.666 | 17.166 | 17.033 | 67.698 | 20 | Did not advance | | | | | |

== Judo ==
Austria has qualified a total of five judokas for each of the following weight classes at the Games. Daniel Allerstorfer, Kathrin Unterwurzacher, Bernadette Graf, two-time Olympian Sabrina Filzmoser, and Beijing 2008 silver medalist Ludwig Paischer were ranked among the top 22 eligible judokas for men and top 14 for women in the IJF World Ranking List of 30 May 2016. Paischer participated in the men's -60 kg event. His first game was in the round of 32 against Hovhannes Davtyan of Armenia. Following 27 seconds, Paischer lost 000–100. Meanwhile, Daniel Allerstorfer participated in the men's +100 kg. He lost in the round of 32 against Renat Saidov of Russia 000 to 010.

In the women's events, Filzmoser participated in the women's -57 kg. She, like both male competitors, was eliminated in the first round she competed in. Nekoda Smythe-Davis of Great Britain overpowered her, finishing the match with a 000–011 scoreline. Unterwurzacher competed in the women's -63 kg event. Her first bout was in the round of 16 against two-time Olympian Estefania García of Ecuador, which she won 010–000 with a waza-ari. Her next game was against Miku Tashiro of Japan. Tashiro beat Unterwurzacher with a yuko, and so Unterwurzacher moved to the repechage match against Anicka van Emden of Netherlands. Mirroring the previous score, Unterwurzacher lost by a waza-ari 000–001. She ranked seventh overall. Graf had a similar system. She beat Maria Portela in a 000–000 contest due to a shido, but lost her next game against Laura Vargas Koch by an ippon. Unlike Unterwurzacher, Graf won the repechage bout against Kelitae Zupancic 010–001. In the bronze medal match, Graf competed against Sally Conway of Great Britain. She lost it 000 to 001. Her final ranking was 5th.

| Athlete | Event | Round of 64 | Round of 32 | Round of 16 | Quarterfinals | Semifinals | Repechage | Final / BM | |
| Athlete | Event | Opposition Result | Opposition Result | Opposition Result | Opposition Result | Opposition Result | Opposition Result | Opposition Result | Rank |
|---|---|---|---|---|---|---|---|---|---|
| Ludwig Paischer | Men's −60 kg | Bye | Davtyan (ARM); L 000–100 | Did not advance | | | | | |
| Daniel Allerstorfer | Men's +100 kg | — | Saidov (RUS); L 000–010 | Did not advance | | | | | |
| Sabrina Filzmoser | Women's −57 kg | — | Smythe-Davis (GBR); L 000–011 | Did not advance | | | | | |
| Kathrin Unterwurzacher | Women's −63 kg | — | Bye | García (ECU); W 010–000 | Tashiro (JPN); L 000–001 | Did not advance | van Emden (NED); L 000–001 | Did not advance | 7 |
| Bernadette Graf | Women's −70 kg | — | Bye | Portela (BRA); W 000–000 S | Koch (GER); L 000–100 | Did not advance | Zupancic (CAN); W 010–001 | Conway (GBR); L 000–001 | 5 |

== Rowing ==
Austria has qualified two boats for each of the following classes into the Olympic regatta, signifying the nation's Olympic return to the sport for the first time since 2004. Rowers competing in the men's lightweight double sculls and women's single sculls had confirmed Olympic places for their boats at the 2015 FISA World Championships in Lac d'Aiguebelette, France. Brothers Bernhard and Paul Sieber competed in the men's lightweight double sculls. Following a fourth place finish in the heats, the Austrian pair eked out the Swiss delegation by 1.49 seconds in the repechage to qualify for the semifinals in second place. The brothers proceeded to finish last in both the semifinals and non-medal finals, with times of 6:53.62 and 6:42.19 respectively.

Magdalena Lobnig represented Austria in the women's single sculls event. She placed first in her heat and third in the quarterfinals, thus qualifying to semi-finals A/B. Lobnig performed well in the semi-finals too, finishing third with a time of 7:45.48 and earning a place in the medallic final A. In the finals, Lobnig finished in last place after 7:34.86 minutes, 13.32 seconds behind Australian winner Kim Brennan, but still achieving Austria's best Olympic rowing performance since 1996.

| Athlete | Event | Heats | | Repechage | | Quarterfinals | | Semifinals | | Final | |
| Athlete | Event | Time | Rank | Time | Rank | Time | Rank | Time | Rank | Time | Rank |
|---|---|---|---|---|---|---|---|---|---|---|---|
| Bernhard Sieber; Paul Sieber | Men's lightweight double sculls | 6:43.37 | 4 R | 7:06.41 | 2 SA/B | — | | 6:53.62 | 6 FB | 6:42.19 | 12 |
| Magdalena Lobnig | Women's single sculls | 8:26.83 | 1 QF | Bye | | 7:35.37 | 3 SA/B | 7:45.48 | 3 FA | 7:34.86 | 6 |

Qualification Legend: FA=Final A (medal); FB=Final B (non-medal); FC=Final C (non-medal); FD=Final D (non-medal); FE=Final E (non-medal); FF=Final F (non-medal); SA/B=Semifinals A/B; SC/D=Semifinals C/D; SE/F=Semifinals E/F; QF=Quarterfinals; R=Repechage

== Sailing ==
Austrian sailors have qualified one boat in each of the following classes through the 2014 ISAF Sailing World Championships, the individual fleet Worlds, and European qualifying regattas. The entire sailing team was announced by the Austrian Olympic Committee on 29 March 2016 at the initial stage of the nomination meeting, with 49er crew Nico Delle-Karth and Nikolaus Resch remarkably going to their fourth Olympics.

Men

| Athlete | Event | Race | | | | | | | | | | | | | Net points | Final rank |
| Athlete | Event | 1 | 2 | 3 | 4 | 5 | 6 | 7 | 8 | 9 | 10 | 11 | 12 | M* | Net points | Final rank |
|---|---|---|---|---|---|---|---|---|---|---|---|---|---|---|---|---|
| Florian Reichstädter; Matthias Schmid | 470 | 3 | 9 | 6 | 9 | 16 | 2 | 13 | 14 | ~~17~~ | 1 | — | | 14 | 87 | 8 |
| Nico Delle-Karth; Nikolaus Resch | 49er | 17 | 6 | 10 | 18 | 3 | 14 | 3 | 14 | ~~21~~ | 4 | 11 | 16 | EL | 116 | 12 |

Women

| Athlete | Event | Race | | | | | | | | | | | Net points | Final rank |
| Athlete | Event | 1 | 2 | 3 | 4 | 5 | 6 | 7 | 8 | 9 | 10 | M* | Net points | Final rank |
|---|---|---|---|---|---|---|---|---|---|---|---|---|---|---|
| Jolanta Ogar; Lara Vadlau | 470 | 3 | 12 | 12 | 5 | 6 | 1 | 5 | 16 | ~~21~~ | 14 | 18 | 92 | 9 |

Mixed

| Athlete | Event | Race | | | | | | | | | | | | | Net points | Final rank |
| Athlete | Event | 1 | 2 | 3 | 4 | 5 | 6 | 7 | 8 | 9 | 10 | 11 | 12 | M* | Net points | Final rank |
|---|---|---|---|---|---|---|---|---|---|---|---|---|---|---|---|---|
| Thomas Zajac; Tanja Frank | Nacra 17 | ~~12~~ | 3 | 12 | 6 | 9 | 8 | 8 | 3 | 4 | 10 | 4 | 5 | 6 | 78 | 3rd place, bronze medalist(s) |

M = Medal race; EL = Eliminated – did not advance into the medal race

== Shooting ==
Austrian shooters have achieved quota places for the following events by virtue of their best finishes at the 2014 and 2015 ISSF World Championships, the 2015 ISSF World Cup series, and European Championships or Games, as long as they obtained a minimum qualifying score (MQS) by 31 March 2016. The entire shooting squad was named to the Austrian roster for the Games on 1 July 2016.

| Athlete | Event | Qualification | | Semifinal | | Final | |
| Athlete | Event | Points | Rank | Points | Rank | Points | Rank |
|---|---|---|---|---|---|---|---|
| Sebastian Kuntschik | Men's skeet | 116 | 25 | Did not advance | | | |
| Thomas Mathis | Men's 50 m rifle prone | 622.4 | 17 | — | | Did not advance | |
| Gernot Rumpler | Men's 10 m air rifle | 620.4 | 32 | — | | Did not advance | |
| Gernot Rumpler | Men's 50 m rifle 3 positions | 1161 | 36 | — | | Did not advance | |
| Alexander Schmirl | Men's 10 m air rifle | 623.7 | 15 | — | | Did not advance | |
| Alexander Schmirl | Men's 50 m rifle prone | 621.4 | 24 | — | | Did not advance | |
| Alexander Schmirl | Men's 50 m rifle 3 positions | 1170 | 17 | — | | Did not advance | |
| Olivia Hofmann | Women's 10 m air rifle | 415.7 | 10 | — | | Did not advance | |
| Olivia Hofmann | Women's 50 m rifle 3 positions | 586 | 3 Q | — | | 424.5 | 5 |

Qualification Legend: Q = Qualify for the next round; q = Qualify for the bronze medal (shotgun)

== Swimming ==
Austrian swimmers have so far achieved qualifying standards in the following events (up to a maximum of 2 swimmers in each event at the Olympic Qualifying Time (OQT), and potentially 1 at the Olympic Selection Time (OST)):

Two-time Olympic swimmer Birgit Koschischek, London 2012 Olympian Lisa Zaiser, and rookie Felix Auböck were selected as part of the second batch of nominated Austrian athletes for the Games on 23 June 2016.

| Athlete | Event | Heat | | Semifinal | | Final | |
| Athlete | Event | Time | Rank | Time | Rank | Time | Rank |
|---|---|---|---|---|---|---|---|
| Felix Auböck | Men's 200 m freestyle | 1:47.24 | 18 | Did not advance | | | |
| Felix Auböck | Men's 400 m freestyle | 3:49.35 | 25 | — | | Did not advance | |
| Felix Auböck | Men's 1500 m freestyle | 15:36.24 | 42 | — | | Did not advance | |
| David Brandl | Men's 400 m freestyle | 3:54.59 | 40 | — | | Did not advance | |
| Birgit Koschischek | Women's 50 m freestyle | 25.58 | 39 | Did not advance | | | |
| Lena Kreundl | Women's 200 m individual medley | 2:15.71 | =30 | Did not advance | | | |
| Jördis Steinegger | Women's 400 m individual medley | 4:47.84 | 29 | — | | Did not advance | |
| Lisa Zaiser | Women's 200 m individual medley | 2:15.23 | 26 | Did not advance | | | |

== Synchronized swimming ==
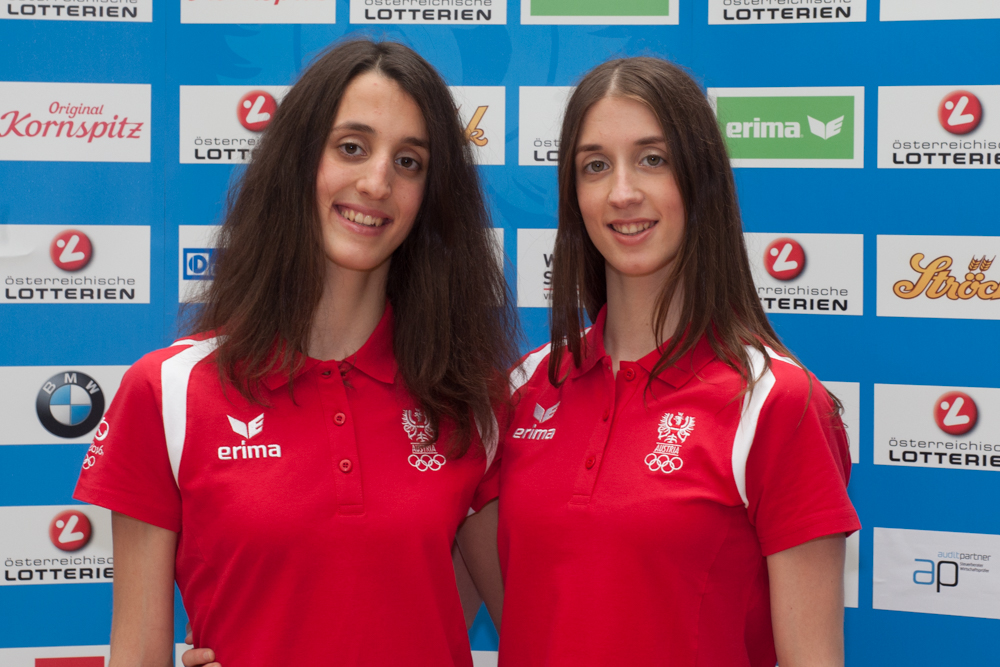
Anna-Marie and Eirini-Marina Alexandri at the hand-out of the official attire for the 2016 Summer Olympics

Austria has fielded a squad of two synchronized swimmers to compete only in the women's duet by virtue of their sixth-place finish at the FINA Olympic test event in Rio de Janeiro. The Alexandri twin sisters, Anna-Marie and Eirini-Marina were chosen to participate. They had the eleventh highest score in their technical routine with 85.0637. In the free routine, they finished twelfth with 85.5333 points, adding up to a total of 170.3304. The Alexandri sisters finished the preliminary round in the last qualifying spot for the finals, where they were awarded 85.5333 points for the free routine. They placed twelfth in a total of 170.5970 points.

| Athlete | Event | Technical routine | | Free routine (preliminary) | | | Free routine (final) | | |
| Athlete | Event | Points | Rank | Points | Total (technical + free) | Rank | Points | Total (technical + free) | Rank |
|---|---|---|---|---|---|---|---|---|---|
| Anna-Maria Alexandri; Eirini Alexandri | Duet | 85.0637 | 11 | 85.2667 | 170.3304 | 12 Q | 85.5333 | 170.5970 | 12 |

== Table tennis ==
Austria has fielded a team of six athletes into the table tennis competition at the Games. Chinese-born Liu Jia secured one of ten available Olympic spots in the women's singles by winning the group final match at the European Qualification Tournament in Halmstad, Sweden. Meanwhile, Sofia Polcanova, Stefan Fegerl, and London 2012 Olympian Robert Gardos were automatically selected among the top 22 eligible players each in their respective singles events based on the ITTF Olympic Rankings.

Daniel Habesohn and Beijing 2008 Olympian Li Qiangbing were each awarded the third spot to build the men's and women's teams for the Games by virtue of a top 10 national finish in the ITTF Olympic Rankings.

Men

| Athlete | Event | Preliminary | Round 1 | Round 2 | Round 3 | Round of 16 | Quarterfinals | Semifinals | Final / BM | |
| Athlete | Event | Opposition Result | Opposition Result | Opposition Result | Opposition Result | Opposition Result | Opposition Result | Opposition Result | Opposition Result | Rank |
|---|---|---|---|---|---|---|---|---|---|---|
| Stefan Fegerl | Singles | Bye | | | Niwa (JPN); L 1–4 | Did not advance | | | | |
| Robert Gardos | Singles | Bye | | Ionescu (ROU); L 1–4 | Did not advance | | | | | |
| Stefan Fegerl; Robert Gardos; Daniel Habesohn | Team | — | | | | Portugal; W 3–1 | Germany; L 1–3 | Did not advance | | |

Women

| Athlete | Event | Preliminary | Round 1 | Round 2 | Round 3 | Round of 16 | Quarterfinals | Semifinals | Final / BM | |
| Athlete | Event | Opposition Result | Opposition Result | Opposition Result | Opposition Result | Opposition Result | Opposition Result | Opposition Result | Opposition Result | Rank |
|---|---|---|---|---|---|---|---|---|---|---|
| Liu Jia | Singles | Bye | | | Li Jiao (NED); W 4–1 | Feng Tw (SIN); L 1–4 | Did not advance | | | |
| Sofia Polcanova | Singles | Bye | | Lay J F (AUS); L 1–4 | Did not advance | | | | | |
| Li Qiangbing; Liu Jia; Sofia Polcanova | Team | — | | | | Netherlands; W 3–1 | Japan; L 0–3 | Did not advance | | |

== Tennis ==
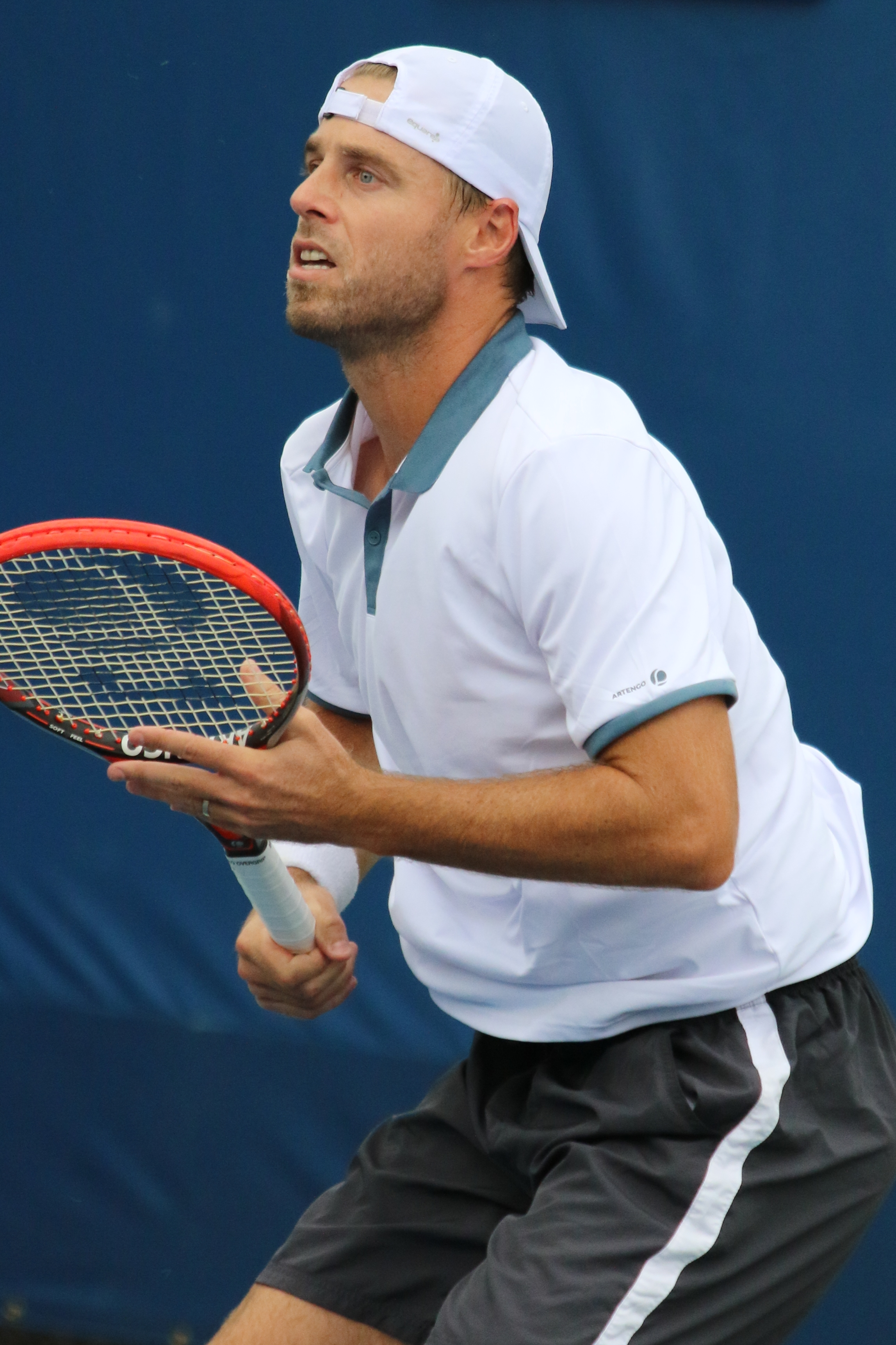
Oliver Marach competing in the 2016 US Open

Austria entered two tennis players into the men's doubles events. Oliver Marach and Alexander Peya had claimed one of eight ITF Olympic men's doubles places, as Austria's top-ranked tennis pair outside of direct qualifying position in the ATP World Rankings as of 6 June 2016. In the round of 32, the duo beat Aliaksandr Bury and Max Mirny of Belarus two sets to none. In the following round, Marach and Peya beat Americans Brian Baker and Rajeev Ram in the first set 6–4 but lost the next set following a tiebreaker, before closing it out with a 6–3 win in a 2 hour match. The Austrian pair lost in the quarterfinals to eventual gold medallists Marc López and Rafael Nadal of Spain.

| Athlete | Event | Round of 32 | Round of 16 | Quarterfinals | Semifinals | Final / BM | |
| Athlete | Event | Opposition Result | Opposition Result | Opposition Result | Opposition Result | Opposition Result | Rank |
|---|---|---|---|---|---|---|---|
| Oliver Marach; Alexander Peya | Men's doubles | Bury / Mirnyi (BLR); W 7–6^{(7–4)}, 7–5 | Baker / Ram (USA); W 6–4, 6–7^{(2–7)}, 6–3 | López / Nadal (ESP); L 3–6, 1–6 | Did not advance | | |

== Triathlon ==
Austria has qualified a total of three triathletes for the following events at the Olympics. Sara Vilic and London 2012 Olympian Lisa Perterer were ranked among the top 40 eligible triathletes in the women's event based on the ITU Olympic Qualification List as of 15 May 2016. Meanwhile, Thomas Springer was selected as the highest-ranked triathlete from Europe in the men's event based on the ITU Points List.

| Athlete | Event | Swim (1.5 km) | Trans 1 | Bike (40 km) | Trans 2 | Run (10 km) | Total Time | Rank |
|---|---|---|---|---|---|---|---|---|
| Thomas Springer | Men's | 19:45 | 0:49 | 59:41 | 0:39 | 34:20 | 1:55:14 | 47 |
| Julia Hauser | Women's | 22:08 | 0:53 | Lapped | | | | |
| Sara Vilic | Women's | 19:43 | 0:55 | 1:04:04 | 0:45 | 37:43 | 2:03:10 | 37 |

== Volleyball ==
=== Beach ===
Two Austria men's beach volleyball teams qualified directly for the Olympics; one by virtue of their nation's top 15 placement in the FIVB Olympic Rankings as of 13 June 2016, and the other by winning the final match over Belgium at the 2016 CEV Continental Cup in Stavanger, Norway. These places were awarded to three-time Olympians Clemens Doppler and Alexander Horst, along with rookies Alexander Huber and Robin Seidl.

| Athlete | Event | Preliminary round | Standing | Round of 16 | Quarterfinals | Semifinals | Final / BM | |
| Athlete | Event | Opposition Score | Standing | Opposition Score | Opposition Score | Opposition Score | Opposition Score | Rank |
|---|---|---|---|---|---|---|---|---|
| Clemens Doppler; Alexander Horst | Men's | Pool A Carambula – Ranghieri (ITA); L 0 – 2 (14–21, 13–21); Cerutti – Schmidt (BRA); W 2 – 1 (23–21, 16–21, 15–13); Binstock – Schachter (CAN); W 2 – 1 (21–19, 16–21, 15–8) | 3 Q | Díaz – González (CUB); L 0 – 2 (17–21, 14–21) | Did not advance | | | |
| Alexander Huber; Robin Seidl | Men's | Pool F Gavira – Herrera (ESP); L 1 – 2 (21–14, 17–21, 13–15); Gibb – Patterson (USA); W 2 – 0 (21–18, 21–18); Jefferson – Cherif (QAT); L 1 – 2 (21–18, 19–21, 12–15) | 3 Q | Dalhausser – Lucena (USA); L 0 – 2 (14–21, 15–21) | Did not advance | | | |

== Weightlifting ==
Austria has received an unused quota place from IWF to send a male weightlifter to the Olympics, signifying the nation's return to the sport for the first time since 2004. Sargis Martirosjan, who has previously competed in the 2014 and 2015 World Weightlifting Championships as well as the 2015 and 2016 European Weightlifting Championships was chosen to participate. He successfully cleared his first snatch of 179 kilograms (395 lb), but then scratched his next two attempts of 184 kilograms (406 lb), ending him in a tie for tenth. In the clean and jerk section, he cleared all of his attempts, starting with 201 kilograms (443 lb), moving on to 208 kilograms (459 lb), and ending on 210 kilograms (460 lb), placing him in eleventh position for the round. His total score of 389 kilograms put him to eleventh overall.

| Athlete | Event | Snatch | | Clean & Jerk | | Total | Rank |
| Athlete | Event | Result | Rank | Result | Rank | Total | Rank |
|---|---|---|---|---|---|---|---|
| Sargis Martirosjan | Men's −105 kg | 179 | =10 | 210 | 11 | 389 | 11 |

== Wrestling ==
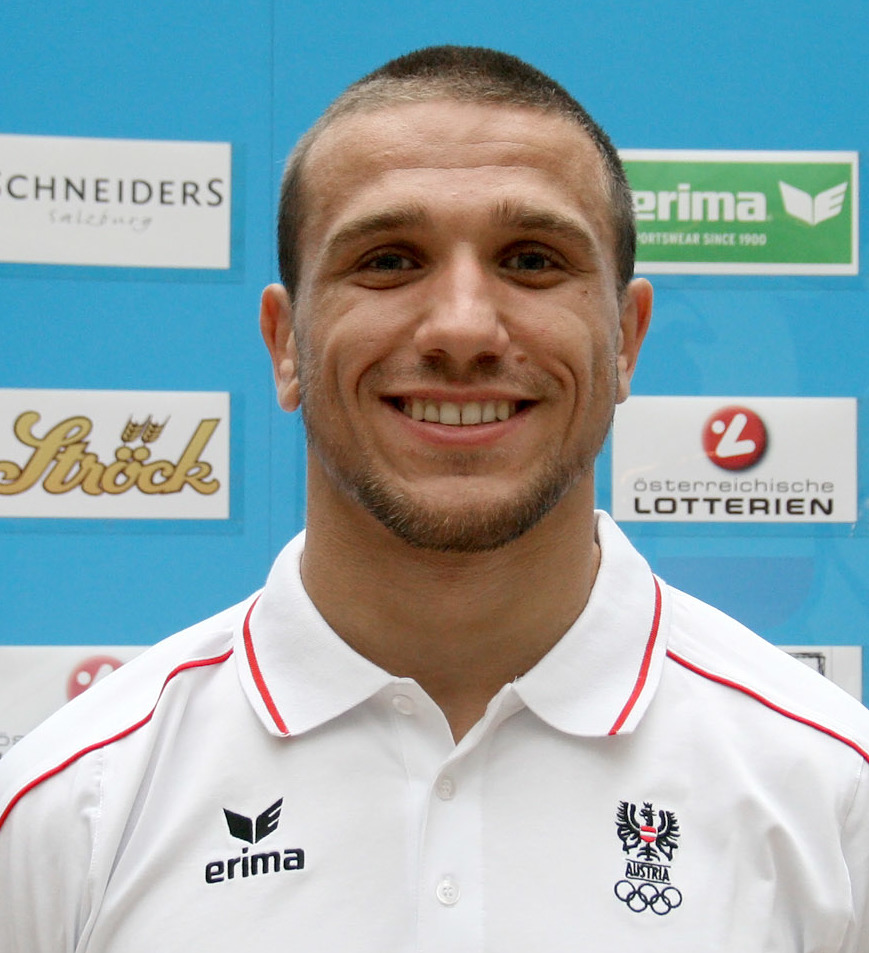
Amer Hrustanović during the 2012 London Olympics

Austria received a spare host berth freed up by Brazil as the next highest-ranked eligible nation, not yet qualified, to send a wrestler competing in the men's Greco-Roman 85 kg to the Olympics, based on the results from the World Championships. Thomas Reichenauer, the president of the Austrian Wrestling Association nominated Amer Hrustanović, who previously competed in the 2012 London Olympics, citing his hard work in recent years. Hrustanović beat Finn Rami Hietaniemi in the round of 16 before losing to eventual bronze medal winner Javid Hamzatau in the quarterfinals, finishing tenth overall.

Key:

- VT – Victory by Fall.
- PP – Decision by Points – the loser with technical points.
- PO – Decision by Points – the loser without technical points.
- ST – Great superiority – the loser without technical points and a margin of victory of at least 8 (Greco-Roman) or 10 (freestyle) points.
- SP – Technical superiority – the loser with technical points and a margin of victory of at least 8 (Greco-Roman) or 10 (freestyle) points.

Men's Greco-Roman

| Athlete | Event | Qualification | Round of 16 | Quarterfinal | Semifinal | Repechage 1 | Repechage 2 | Final / BM | |
| Athlete | Event | Opposition Result | Opposition Result | Opposition Result | Opposition Result | Opposition Result | Opposition Result | Opposition Result | Rank |
|---|---|---|---|---|---|---|---|---|---|
| Amer Hrustanović | −85 kg | Bye | Hietaniemi (FIN); W 3–1 ^{PP} | Hamzatau (BLR); L 0–4 ^{ST} | Did not advance | | | | 10 |

== See also ==
- Austria at the 2016 Summer Paralympics
