= Angola at the 2016 Summer Olympics =

- IOC code: ANG
- NOC: Angolan Olympic Committee
- Website: www.comiteolimpicoangolano.com

in Rio de Janeiro
- Competitors: 25 in 7 sports
- Flag bearer: Luisa Kiala
- Medals: Gold 0 Silver 0 Bronze 0 Total 0

Summer Olympics appearances (overview)
- 1980; 1984; 1988; 1992; 1996; 2000; 2004; 2008; 2012; 2016; 2020; 2024

Angola competed at the 2016 Summer Olympics in Rio de Janeiro, Brazil, from 5 to 21 August 2016. This was the nation's ninth consecutive appearance at the Summer Olympics, with the exception of the 1984 Summer Olympics in Los Angeles, because of its participation in the Soviet boycott.

The Angolan Olympic Committee (Portuguese: Comité Olímpico Angolano) selected a total of 25 athletes, 8 men and 17 women, for the Games, competing in seven different sports. The nation's team size was roughly ten athletes smaller than the team sent to London four years earlier, and had the second largest share of women in its Summer Olympic history. Women's handball was the only team-based sport in which Angola had its representation at these Games, unable to send any of the nation's basketball teams to the Olympics for the first time since 1988. Among the sports played by the athletes, Angola marked its debut in rowing and a return in sailing and shooting from a two-decade absence.

Notable Angolan athletes featured three-time judoka Antónia Moreira, medley swimmer Pedro Pinotes, trap shooter João Paulo da Silva, who sought for his Olympic comeback in Rio after a 16-year absence, and four-time Olympian and handball team captain Luísa Kiala, who became the nation's flag bearer in the opening ceremony. Angola, however, has yet to win its first ever Olympic medal.

== Athletics ==
Angola has received universality slots from IAAF to send two athletes (one male and one female) to the Olympics.

Key

- Note – Ranks given for track events are within the athlete's heat only
- Q = Qualified for the next round
- q = Qualified for the next round as a fastest loser or, in field events, by position without achieving the qualifying target
- NR = National record
- N/A = Round not applicable for the event
- Bye = Athlete not required to compete in round

Track & road events

Athlete	Event	Heat		Quarterfinal		Semifinal		Final	
Athlete	Event	Time	Rank	Time	Rank	Time	Rank	Time	Rank
Hermenegildo Leite	Men's 100 m	11.65	7	Did not advance					
Liliana Neto	Women's 100 m	13.58	7	Did not advance					

== Handball ==
Summary

Key:

- ET – After extra time
- P – Match decided by penalty-shootout.

Team	Event	Group Stage						Quarterfinal	Semifinal	Final / BM	
Team	Event	Opposition Score	Opposition Score	Opposition Score	Opposition Score	Opposition Score	Rank	Opposition Score	Opposition Score	Opposition Score	Rank
Angola women's	Women's tournament	Romania; W 23–19	Montenegro; W 27–25	Norway; L 20–30	Brazil; L 24–28	Spain; L 22–26	4	Russia; L 27–31	Did not advance		8

=== Women's tournament ===
Angola women's handball team qualified for the Olympics by winning the 2015 Africa Qualification Tournament in Luanda. They were drawn in Group A of the preliminary round.

Team roster

The following is the Angola roster in the women's handball tournament of the 2016 Summer Olympics.

Head coach: Filipe Cruz

No.	Pos.	Name	Date of birth (age)	Height	App.	Goals	Club
1	GK	Neyde Barbosa	23 September 1980 (aged 35)	1.77 m	38	1	(Angola) Progresso do Sambizanga
6	RW	Juliana Machado	6 November 1994 (aged 21)	1.70 m	25	48	(Angola) Primeiro de Agosto
8	CB	Lurdes Monteiro	11 July 1984 (aged 32)	1.70 m	32	49	(Angola) Primeiro de Agosto
9	CB	Natália Bernardo	25 December 1986 (aged 29)	1.70 m	73	192	(Angola) Primeiro de Agosto
10	P	Albertina Kassoma	12 June 1996 (aged 20)	1.90 m	14	39	(Angola) Primeiro de Agosto
11	LB	Luísa Kiala	25 January 1982 (aged 34)	1.72 m	104	194	(Angola) Petro de Luanda
12	GK	Cristina Branco	15 March 1985 (aged 31)	1.70 m	59	0	(Angola) Primeiro de Agosto
15	RB	Azenaide Carlos	14 June 1990 (aged 26)	1.75 m	50	150	(Angola) Petro de Luanda
16	GK	Teresa Almeida	5 May 1988 (aged 28)	1.78 m	32	0	(Angola) Petro de Luanda
17	RB	Wuta Dombaxe	5 April 1986 (aged 30)	1.73 m	32	64	(Angola) Primeiro de Agosto
21	LB	Magda Cazanga	28 May 1991 (aged 25)	1.84 m	21	28	(Angola) Petro de Luanda
25	P	Liliana Venâncio	19 September 1995 (aged 20)	1.86 m	6	3	(Angola) Primeiro de Agosto
31	LW	Janete dos Santos	10 June 1991 (aged 25)	1.75 m	10	0	(Angola) Progresso do Sambizanga
90	CB	Isabel Guialo	8 April 1990 (aged 26)	1.72 m	33	60	(Angola) Primeiro de Agosto

Preliminary round

Pos	Team	Pld	W	D	L	GF	GA	GD	Pts	Qualification
1	Brazil (H)	5	4	0	1	138	117	+21	8	Quarter-finals
2	Norway	5	4	0	1	141	121	+20	8	Quarter-finals
3	Spain	5	3	0	2	125	116	+9	6	Quarter-finals
4	Angola	5	2	0	3	116	128	−12	4	Quarter-finals
5	Romania	5	2	0	3	108	119	−11	4	
6	Montenegro	5	0	0	5	107	134	−27	0	

Source: IHF
Rules for classification: 1) Points; 2) Head-to-head points; 3) Head-to-head goal difference; 4) Head-to-head goals scored; 5) Goal difference; 6) Goals scored; 7) Draw.
(H) Hosts

6 August 2016; 19:50	Romania	19–23	Angola	Future Arena, Rio de Janeiro; Attendance: 4,465; Referees: Koo, Lee (KOR)
6 August 2016; 19:50	Neagu 8	(9–11)	Guialo 5	Future Arena, Rio de Janeiro; Attendance: 4,465; Referees: Koo, Lee (KOR)
6 August 2016; 19:50	2× (yellow card) 2× (suspension)	Report	3× (yellow card) 5× (suspension)	Future Arena, Rio de Janeiro; Attendance: 4,465; Referees: Koo, Lee (KOR)

8 August 2016; 21:50	Angola	27–25	Montenegro	Future Arena, Rio de Janeiro; Referees: Alpaidze, Berekzina (RUS)
8 August 2016; 21:50	Guialo 7	(12–12)	K. Bulatović 9	Future Arena, Rio de Janeiro; Referees: Alpaidze, Berekzina (RUS)
8 August 2016; 21:50	2× (yellow card) 8× (suspension) 1× (red card)	Report	2× (yellow card) 4× (suspension)	Future Arena, Rio de Janeiro; Referees: Alpaidze, Berekzina (RUS)

10 August 2016; 16:40	Norway	30–20	Angola	Future Arena, Rio de Janeiro; Referees: Bonaventura, Bonaventura (FRA)
10 August 2016; 16:40	Mørk 8	(16–8)	Guialo 8	Future Arena, Rio de Janeiro; Referees: Bonaventura, Bonaventura (FRA)
10 August 2016; 16:40	2× (yellow card) 3× (suspension)	Report	2× (yellow card) 4× (suspension) 1× (red card)	Future Arena, Rio de Janeiro; Referees: Bonaventura, Bonaventura (FRA)

12 August 2016; 09:30	Angola	24–28	Brazil	Future Arena, Rio de Janeiro; Referees: Røen, Arntsen (NOR)
12 August 2016; 09:30	Bernardo 8	(13–13)	Belo 7	Future Arena, Rio de Janeiro; Referees: Røen, Arntsen (NOR)
12 August 2016; 09:30	2× (yellow card) 5× (suspension)	Report	4× (yellow card) 4× (suspension)	Future Arena, Rio de Janeiro; Referees: Røen, Arntsen (NOR)

14 August 2016; 19:50	Spain	26–22	Angola	Future Arena, Rio de Janeiro; Referees: Pinto, Menezes (BRA)
14 August 2016; 19:50	Cabral, Martín 7	(13–12)	Guialo 6	Future Arena, Rio de Janeiro; Referees: Pinto, Menezes (BRA)
14 August 2016; 19:50	4× (yellow card) 5× (suspension)	Report	3× (yellow card) 8× (suspension) 1× (red card)	Future Arena, Rio de Janeiro; Referees: Pinto, Menezes (BRA)

Quarterfinal

16 August 2016; 20:30	Russia	31–27	Angola	Future Arena, Rio de Janeiro; Referees: Pinto, Menezes (BRA)
16 August 2016; 20:30	Kuznetsova 5	(18–14)	Bernardo 8	Future Arena, Rio de Janeiro; Referees: Pinto, Menezes (BRA)
16 August 2016; 20:30	2× (yellow card) 5× (suspension) 1× (red card)	Report	3× (yellow card) 4× (suspension)	Future Arena, Rio de Janeiro; Referees: Pinto, Menezes (BRA)

== Judo ==
Angola has qualified one judoka for the women's middleweight category (70 kg) at the Games. Remarkably going to her third Olympics, Antónia Moreira earned a continental quota spot from the African region as the highest-ranked Angolan judoka outside of direct qualifying position in the IJF World Ranking List of 30 May 2016.

Athlete	Event	Round of 32	Round of 16	Quarterfinals	Semifinals	Repechage	Final / BM	
Athlete	Event	Opposition Result	Opposition Result	Opposition Result	Opposition Result	Opposition Result	Opposition Result	Rank
Antónia Moreira	Women's −70 kg	Rodríguez (VEN); W 100–000	Koch (GER); L 000–000 S	Did not advance				

== Rowing ==
Angola has qualified one boat in the men's lightweight double sculls for the Games at the 2015 African Continental Qualification Regatta in Tunis, Tunisia.

Athlete	Event	Heats		Repechage		Semifinals		Final	
Athlete	Event	Time	Rank	Time	Rank	Time	Rank	Time	Rank
André Matias; Jean-Luc Rasamoelina	Men's lightweight double sculls	6:58.93	5 R	7:29.73	6 SC/D	7:39.59	4 FD	7:01.74	20

Qualification Legend: FA=Final A (medal); FB=Final B (non-medal); FC=Final C (non-medal); FD=Final D (non-medal); FE=Final E (non-medal); FF=Final F (non-medal); SA/B=Semifinals A/B; SC/D=Semifinals C/D; SE/F=Semifinals E/F; QF=Quarterfinals; R=Repechage

== Sailing ==
Angolan sailors have qualified one boat in each of the following classes through the individual fleet World Championships, and African qualifying regattas, signifying the nation's Olympic return to the sport for the first time since 1992. Another boat was also awarded to the Angolan sailor competing in the men's Laser through a Tripartite Commission invitation.

Athlete	Event	Race											Net points	Final rank
Athlete	Event	1	2	3	4	5	6	7	8	9	10	M*	Net points	Final rank
Manuel Lelo	Men's Laser	44	43	45	45	~~DNF~~	43	43	38	46	43	EL	390	46
Paixão Afonso; Matias Montinho	Men's 470	25	26	~~27~~	27	26	23	26	26	26	24	EL	229	26

M = Medal race; EL = Eliminated – did not advance into the medal race

== Shooting ==
Angola has received an invitation from the Tripartite Commission to send a men's trap shooter to the Olympics, as long as the minimum qualifying score (MQS) was met by 31 March 2016. This also signified the nation's comeback to the sport for the first time since 2000.

Athlete	Event	Qualification		Semifinal		Final	
Athlete	Event	Points	Rank	Points	Rank	Points	Rank
João Paulo de Silva	Men's trap	98	33	Did not advance			

Qualification Legend: Q = Qualify for the next round; q = Qualify for the bronze medal (shotgun)

== Swimming ==
Angola has received a Universality invitation from FINA to send two swimmers (one male and one female) to the Olympics.

Athlete	Event	Heat		Semifinal		Final	
Athlete	Event	Time	Rank	Time	Rank	Time	Rank
Pedro Pinotes	Men's 400 m individual medley	4:25.84	25	—		Did not advance	
Ana Nóbrega	Women's 100 m freestyle	59.23	40	Did not advance			
