= Rowing at the 2016 Summer Olympics – Men's lightweight double sculls =

Men's lightweight double sculls at the Games of the XXXI Olympiad
- Venue: Rodrigo de Freitas Lagoon
- Date: 8–12 August 2016
- Competitors: 40 from 20 nations
- Winning time: 6:30.70

Medalists
1st place, gold medalist(s)		Pierre Houin; Jérémie Azou	France
2nd place, silver medalist(s)		Gary O'Donovan; Paul O'Donovan	Ireland
3rd place, bronze medalist(s)		Kristoffer Brun; Are Strandli	Norway

The men's lightweight double sculls at the 2016 Summer Olympics in Rio de Janeiro were held from 8 to 12 August at the Lagoon Rodrigo de Freitas.

The medals for the competition were presented by Luis Alberto Moreno, Colombia, member of the International Olympic Committee, and the gifts were presented by Patrick Rombaut, Belgium, Member of the Executive Committee of the International Rowing Federation.

== Schedule ==
Date	Time	Round
Monday, 8 August 2016	11:50	Heats
Tuesday, 9 August 2016	11:40	Repechages
Thursday, 11 August 2016	11:40	Semifinals
Thursday, 11 August 2016	13:40	Semifinals C/D
Friday, 12 August 2016	9:20	Final B
Friday, 12 August 2016	10:44	Final
Friday, 12 August 2016	12:10	Final D
Friday, 12 August 2016	12:30	Final C

== Results ==
=== Heats ===
First two of each heat qualify to the semifinals, remainder goes to the repechage.

==== Heat 1 ====
Rank	Rowers	Country	Time	Notes
1	Gary O'Donovan; Paul O'Donovan	Ireland	6:23.72	SA/B
2	Andrea Micheletti; Marcello Miani	Italy	6:24.10	SA/B
3	Mads Rasmussen; Rasmus Quist Hansen	Denmark	6:33.67	R
4	Moritz Moos; Jason Osborne	Germany	6:40.48	R
5	Cem Yilmaz; Huseyin Kandemir	Turkey	6:41.67	R

==== Heat 2 ====
Rank	Rowers	Country	Time	Notes
1	Kristoffer Brun; Are Strandli	Norway	6:24.81	SA/B
2	Josh Konieczny; Andrew Cambell	United States	6:26.56	SA/B
3	Felipe Cardenas Morales; Bernardo Guerrero Diaz	Chile	6:38.95	R
4	Bernhard Sieber; Paul Sieber	Austria	6:43.37	R
5	Chiu Hin Chun; Tang Chiu Mang	Hong Kong	6:45.05	R

==== Heat 3 ====
Rank	Rowers	Country	Time	Notes
1	Pierre Houin; Jérémie Azou	France	6:24.62	SA/B
2	Artur Mikołajczewski; Miłosz Jankowski	Poland	6:27.70	SA/B
3	Hiroshi Nakano; Hideki Omoto	Japan	6:34.27	R
4	Raúl Hernández; Liosbel Hernández	Cuba	6:39.79	R
5	Andre Mattias; Jean-Luc Rasamoelina	Angola	6:58.93	R

==== Heat 4 ====
Rank	Rowers	Country	Time	Notes
1	James Thompson; John Smith	South Africa	6:23.10	SA/B
2	Will Fletcher; Richard Chambers	Great Britain	6:25.62	SA/B
3	Daniel Wiederkehr; Michael Schmidt	Switzerland	6:29.95	R
4	Sun Man; Wang Chunxin	China	6:30.83	R
5	Xavier Vela Maggi; Willian Giaretton	Brazil	6:31.13	R

=== Repechage ===
First two qualify to the semifinals.

==== Repechage 1 ====
Rank	Rower	Country	Time	Notes
1	Mads Rasmussen; Rasmus Quist Hansen	Denmark	7:02.78	SA/B
2	Sun Man; Wang Chunxin	China	7:03.88	SA/B
3	Raúl Hernández; Liosbel Hernández	Cuba	7:07.17	SC/D
4	Felipe Cardenas Morales; Bernardo Guerrero Diaz	Chile	7:11.38	SC/D
5	Cem Yilmaz; Huseyin Kandemir	Turkey	7:13.49	SC/D
6	Andre Mattias; Jean-Luc Rasamoelina	Angola	7:29.73	SC/D

==== Repechage 2 ====
Rank	Rower	Country	Time	Notes
1	Moritz Moos; Jason Osborne	Germany	7:05.36	SA/B
2	Bernhard Sieber; Paul Sieber	Austria	7:06.41	SA/B
3	Daniel Wiederkehr; Michael Schmidt	Switzerland	7:07.90	SC/D
4	Xavier Vela Maggi; Willian Giaretton	Brazil	7:11.20	SC/D
5	Hiroshi Nakano; Hideki Omoto	Japan	7:13.60	SC/D
6	Chiu Hin Chun; Tang Chiu Mang	Hong Kong	7:22.05	SC/D

=== Semifinals ===
==== Semifinals C/D ====
First three qualify to Final C, remainder to Final D.

===== Semifinal 1 =====
Rank	Rowers	Country	Time	Notes
1	Daniel Wiederkehr; Michael Schmidt	Switzerland	7:22.15	FC
2	Cem Yilmaz; Huseyin Kandemir	Turkey	7:24.14	FC
3	Felipe Cardenas Morales; Bernardo Guerrero Diaz	Chile	7:24.71	FC
4	Chiu Hin Chun; Tang Chiu Mang	Hong Kong	7:33.47	FD

===== Semifinal 2 =====
Rank	Rowers	Country	Time	Notes
1	Xavier Vela Maggi; Willian Giaretton	Brazil	7:27:34	FC
2	Raúl Hernández; Liosbel Hernández	Cuba	7:30.13	FC
3	Hiroshi Nakano; Hideki Omoto	Japan	7:30.64	FC
4	Andre Mattias; Jean-Luc Rasamoelina	Angola	7:39.59	FD

==== Semifinals A/B ====
First three qualify to Final A, remainder to Final B.

===== Semifinal 1 =====
Rank	Rowers	Country	Time	Notes
1	Pierre Houin; Jérémie Azou	France	6:34.43	FA
2	Josh Konieczny; Andrew Cambell	United States	6:35.19	FA
3	Gary O'Donovan; Paul O'Donovan	Ireland	6:35.70	FA
4	Will Fletcher; Richard Chambers	Great Britain	6:38.76	FB
5	Moritz Moos; Jason Osborne	Germany	6:59.28	FB
6	Sun Man; Wang Chunxin	China	7:01.49	FB

===== Semifinal 2 =====
Rank	Rowers	Country	Time	Notes
1	James Thompson; John Smith	South Africa	6:38.01	FA
2	Kristoffer Brun; Are Strandli	Norway	6:38.65	FA
3	Artur Mikołajczewski; Miłosz Jankowski	Poland	6:40.23	FA
4	Andrea Micheletti; Marcello Miani	Italy	6:40.45	FB
5	Mads Rasmussen; Rasmus Quist Hansen	Denmark	6:45.05	FB
6	Bernhard Sieber; Paul Sieber	Austria	6:53.62	FB

=== Finals ===
==== Final D ====
Rank	Rowers	Country	Time	Notes
1	Chiu Hin Chun; Tang Chiu Mang	Hong Kong	6:57.95	
2	Andre Mattias; Jean-Luc Rasamoelina	Angola	7:01.74	

==== Final C ====
Rank	Rowers	Country	Time	Notes
1	Daniel Wiederkehr; Michael Schmidt	Switzerland	6:42.57	
2	Xavier Vela Maggi; Willian Giaretton	Brazil	6:44.80	
3	Hiroshi Nakano; Hideki Omoto	Japan	6:45.81	
4	Cem Yilmaz; Huseyin Kandemir	Turkey	6:47.06	
5	Felipe Cardenas Morales; Bernardo Guerrero Diaz	Chile	6:47.67	
6	Raúl Hernández; Liosbel Hernández	Cuba	6:47.80	

==== Final B ====
Rank	Rowers	Country	Time	Notes
1	Will Fletcher; Richard Chambers	Great Britain	6:28.81	
2	Andrea Micheletti; Marcello Miani	Italy	6:29.52	
3	Moritz Moos; Jason Osborne	Germany	6:32.30	
4	Mads Rasmussen; Rasmus Quist Hansen	Denmark	6:34.72	
5	Sun Man; Wang Chunxin	China	6:40.74	
6	Bernhard Sieber; Paul Sieber	Austria	6:42.19	

==== Final A ====
Rank	Rowers	Country	Time	Notes
1st place, gold medalist(s)	Pierre Houin; Jérémie Azou	France	6:30.70	
2nd place, silver medalist(s)	Gary O'Donovan; Paul O'Donovan	Ireland	6:31.23	
3rd place, bronze medalist(s)	Kristoffer Brun; Are Strandli	Norway	6:31.39	
4	James Thompson; John Smith	South Africa	6:33.29	
5	Josh Konieczny; Andrew Cambell	United States	6:35.07	
6	Artur Mikołajczewski; Miłosz Jankowski	Poland	6:42.00	
