= Rowing at the 2013 Summer Universiade – Men's lightweight double sculls =

The men's lightweight double sculls competition at the 2013 Summer Universiade in Kazan took place the Kazan Rowing Centre on July 6—8, 2013.

== Results ==
=== Heats ===
==== Heat 1 ====
Rank	Rowers	Country	Time	Notes
1	Alan Armenta Vega; Edgar Valenzuela	Mexico	6:57.95	Q
2	Toby Cunliffe-Steel; Matthew Dunham	New Zealand	7:04.75	R
3	Igor Nartov; Oleg Yamkovskiy	Russia	7:07.36	R
4	Shinji Miyazaki; Yoshihiro Otsuka	Japan	7:22.40	R
5	Øyvind Lavoll; Markus Christensen	Norway	7:34.00	R
6	Muhammad Aiman Bin Aziz; Mazlie Bin Daham	Malaysia	7:49.21	R

==== Heat 2 ====
Rank	Rowers	Country	Time	Notes
1	Paul Sieber; Bernhard Sieber	Austria	6:58.69	Q
2	Ihor Khmara; Stanislav Kovalov	Ukraine	7:04.18	R
3	Simone Molteni; Leone Maria Barbaro	Italy	7:04.42	R
4	Joonas Petajaniemi; Juho-Pekka Petajaniemi	Finland	7:14.51	R
5	Maxime Labarthe; Jerome Descazeaux	France	7:17.77	R
6	Hafiz Muhammad Aqeel Umar; Sajid Ghafoor	Pakistan	8:40.86	R

=== Repechage ===
==== Repechage Heat 1 ====
Rank	Rowers	Country	Time	Notes
1	Simone Molteni; Leone Maria Barbaro	Italy	6:42.91	Q
2	Joonas Petajaniemi; Juho-Pekka Petajaniemi	Finland	6:45.12	Q
3	Toby Cunliffe-Steel; Matthew Dunham	New Zealand	6:47.06	
4	Øyvind Lavoll; Markus Christensen	Norway	7:10.34	
5	Muhammad Aiman Bin Aziz; Mazlie Bin Daham	Malaysia	7:24.39	

==== Repechage Heat 2 ====
Rank	Rowers	Country	Time	Notes
1	Ihor Khmara; Stanislav Kovalov	Ukraine	6:48.60	Q
2	Igor Nartov; Oleg Yamkovskiy	Russia	6:52.86	Q
3	Shinji Miyazaki; Yoshihiro Otsuka	Japan	6:57.60	
4	Maxime Labarthe; Jerome Descazeaux	France	6:58.81	
5	Hafiz Muhammad Aqeel Umar; Sajid Ghafoor	Pakistan	8:06.75	

=== Finals ===
==== Final B ====
Rank	Rowers	Country	Time
7	Toby Cunliffe-Steel; Matthew Dunham	New Zealand	6:50.09
8	Shinji Miyazaki; Yoshihiro Otsuka	Japan	6:55.50
9	Maxime Labarthe; Jerome Descazeaux	France	6:56.07
10	Øyvind Lavoll; Markus Christensen	Norway	7:03.72
11	Muhammad Aiman Bin Aziz; Mazlie Bin Daham	Malaysia	7:30.42
12	Hafiz Muhammad Aqeel Umar; Sajid Ghafoor	Pakistan	EXC

==== Final A ====
Rank	Rowers	Country	Time
1st place, gold medalist(s)	Paul Sieber; Bernhard Sieber	Austria	6:40.37
2nd place, silver medalist(s)	Ihor Khmara; Stanislav Kovalov	Ukraine	6:43.11
3rd place, bronze medalist(s)	Simone Molteni; Leone Maria Barbaro	Italy	6:45.49
4	Alan Armenta Vega; Edgar Valenzuela	Mexico	6:48.27
5	Joonas Petajaniemi; Juho-Pekka Petajaniemi	Finland	6:52.73
6	Igor Nartov; Oleg Yamkovskiy	Russia	6:58.23
