= Ihor Khmara =

Ukrainian rower (born 1990)

Personal information
- Nationality: Ukrainian
- Born: 18 March 1990 (age 36) Kyiv, Ukrainian SSR, Soviet Union
- Height: 1.78 m (5 ft 10 in)
- Weight: 70 kg (154 lb)

Sport
- Country: Ukraine
- Sport: Rowing
- Event: Lightweight double sculls
- Club: Ukrainian Armed Forces
- Coached by: Serhiy Prodan, Anton Prodan
Medal record
Men's rowing
Representing Ukraine
World Championships
Bronze medal – third place	2022 Račice	Lwt double sculls
European Championships
Bronze medal – third place	2026 Varese	Lwt single sculls
Universiade
Silver medal – second place	2013 Kazan	Lwt double sculls
Silver medal – second place	2015 Gwangju	Lwt double sculls
Silver medal – second place	2015 Gwangju	Eight

Ihor Khmara (Ukrainian: Ігор Хмара; born 18 March 1990) is a Ukrainian male rower. He represented Ukraine together with Stanislav Kovalov at the 2020 Summer Olympics in the lightweight double sculls competition where they finished 9th.

== Career ==
His best performances at the European Championships were in 2012, 2018, 2020 and 2021 when he finished 6th in lightweight double sculls events.

Khmara competes together with Stanislav Kovalov in lightweight double sculls competitions. They won two silver medals at the Summer Universiades in 2013 and 2015 (that year Khmara also won another silver in men's eight). At the 2017 World Championships in Sarasota they were 9th. At the 2018 World Championships in Plovdiv, they finished 10th. At the 2019 World Championships in Ottensheim, they were 20th.

Khmara also took part in lightweight quadruple sculls competitions. At the 2016 World Championships in Rotterdam, he together with Roman Fedorenko, Serhii Siabro, and Stanislav Kovalov missed medal after finishing 4th behind crews from Germany, France, and Greece.

Khmara managed to qualify together with Stanislav Kovalov for 2020 Summer Olympics after winning European Qualification Regatta in April 2021 in Varese, Italy. They became the first Ukrainian crew to represent Ukraine in this type of boat. In the lightweight double sculls competition they were 4th out of 6 boat in the heat 2 and 1st out of 6 boats in the repechage heat 1. In the semifinal A/B 2 they finished 4th just 1.5 seconds behind the third boat which was the last one to qualify for final. In final B they finished 3rd, thus ranking 9th at the 2020 Summer Olympics.

== Personal life ==
Khmara is married. His hobbies include fishing and cooking.
