= Hiroshi Nakano =

Hiroshi Nakano may refer to:

- Hiroshi Nakano (Gravitation), a character in the manga series Gravitation
- Hiroshi Nakano (footballer) (born 1983), Japanese football defender
- Hiroshi Nakano (rower) (born 1987), Japanese rower
