= Stanislav Kovalov =

Ukrainian rower (born 1991)

Personal information
- Nationality: Ukrainian
- Born: 20 August 1991 (age 34) Kyiv, Ukrainian SSR, Soviet Union
- Height: 1.85 m (6 ft 1 in)
- Weight: 70 kg (154 lb)

Sport
- Country: Ukraine
- Sport: Rowing
- Event: Lightweight double sculls
- Club: Ukrainian Armed Forces
- Coached by: Serhiy Prodan
Medal record
Men's rowing
Representing Ukraine
World Championships
Bronze medal – third place	2022 Račice	Lwt double sculls
Universiade
Silver medal – second place	2013 Kazan	Lwt double sculls
Silver medal – second place	2015 Gwangju	Lwt double sculls

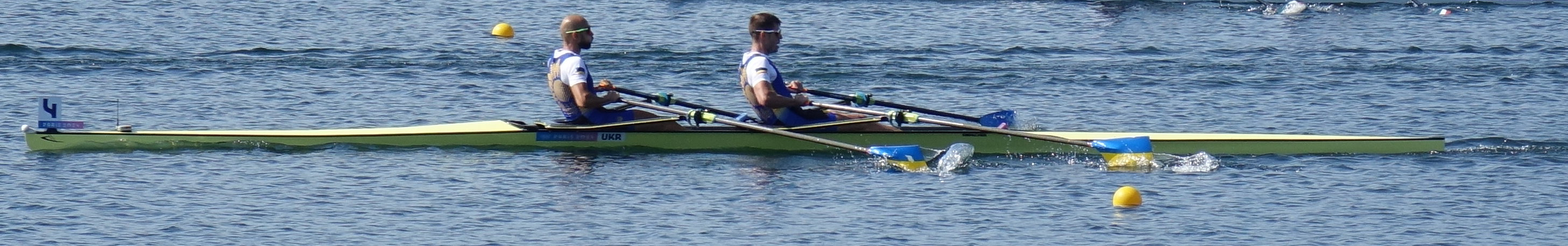
Kovalov rowing at the 2024 Paris Olympics in the men’s double sculls representing Ukraine.

Stanislav Kovalov (Ukrainian: Станіслав Ковальов [stɐn⁽ʲ⁾iˈslɑu̯ kowɐˈlʲɔu̯]; born 20 August 1991) is a Ukrainian rower. He represented Ukraine together with Ihor Khmara at the 2020 Summer Olympics in the lightweight double sculls competition where they finished 9th.

== Career ==
His best performances at the European Championships were in 2012, 2018, 2020 and 2021 when he finished 6th in lightweight double sculls events.

Kovalov competes together with Ihor Khmara in lightweight double sculls competitions. They won two silver medals at the Summer Universiades in 2013 and 2015. At the 2017 World Championships in Sarasota they were 9th. At the 2018 World Championships in Plovdiv, they finished 10th. At the 2019 World Championships in Ottensheim, they were 20th.

Kovalov also took part in lightweight quadruple sculls competitions. At the 2016 World Championships in Rotterdam, he together with Roman Fedorenko, Serhii Siabro, and Ihor Khmara missed a bronze medal after finishing 4th behind crews from Germany, France, and Greece.

Kovalov managed to qualify together with Ihor Khmara for 2020 Summer Olympics after winning European Qualification Regatta in April 2021 in Varese, Italy. They became the first Ukrainian crew to represent Ukraine in this type of boat. In the lightweight double sculls competition they were 4th out of 6 boat in the heat 2 and 1st out of 6 boats in the repechage heat 1. In the semifinal A/B 2 they finished 4th just 1.5 seconds behind the third boat which was the last one to qualify for final. In final B they finished 3rd, thus ranking 9th at the 2020 Summer Olympics.

== Personal life ==
Kovalov is married. His hobbies include reading and cycling.
