= World University Rowing Championships =

Race details
- Discipline: Rowing
- Organiser: FISU

History
- First edition: 1984
- Editions: 15

The World University Rowing Championship is a competition sponsored by the International University Sports Federation (FISU) and sanctioned by the International Rowing Federation (FISA), which was first held in 1984.

== Championships ==
Ed.	Year	City	Country	Events
1	1984	Milan	Italy	
2	1986	Amsterdam	Netherlands	
3	1987	Zagreb	Yugoslavia	
4	1989	Duisburg	West Germany	
5	1992	Poznań	Poland	
6	1993	St. Catharines	Canada	
7	1994	Groningen	Netherlands	
8	1998	Zagreb	Croatia	
9	2000	Poznań	Poland	
10	2002	Nottingham	United Kingdom	
11	2004	Brive-la-Gaillarde	France	
12	2006	Trakai	Lithuania	
13	2008	Belgrade	Serbia	
14	2010	Szeged	Hungary	
15	2012	Kazan	Russia	
16	2013	Kazan	Russia	
17	2014	Gravelines	France	
18	2015	Chungju	South Korea	
19	2016	Poznań	Poland	
20	2018	Shanghai	China	
21	2020	Zagreb	Croatia (Note: Cancelled due to COVID-19.)	
22	2021	Chengdu	China	
23	2022	London	Canada (Note: Exceptionally postponed to July 13–15, 2023, then cancelled due to the postponement of the 2021 Summer World University Games, which held its rowing events August 4–6, 2023.)	
24	2024	Rotterdam	Netherlands	
25	2025	Duisburg	Germany	
26	2026	London	Canada	

== See also ==
- Rowing at the Summer Universiade
