= Andrea Micheletti =

Italian rower

Personal information
- Born: 22 June 1991 (age 35)

Sport
- Sport: Rowing
- Club: Fiamme Oro

Andrea Micheletti (born 22 June 1991) is an Italian rower. He competed in the men's lightweight double sculls event at the 2016 Summer Olympics.
