= Michael Schmid (rower) =

Swiss rower

Personal information
- Born: 2 January 1988 (age 38)

Sport
- Sport: Rowing

Michael Schmid (born 2 January 1988) is a Swiss rower. He competed in the men's lightweight double sculls event at the 2016 Summer Olympics.
