= Daniel Wiederkehr =

Swiss rower

Personal information
- Born: 15 May 1989 (age 37)

Sport
- Sport: Rowing

Daniel Wiederkehr (born 15 May 1989) is a Swiss rower. He competed in the men's lightweight double sculls event at the 2016 Summer Olympics.
