= Josh Konieczny =

American rower

Personal information
- Nationality: American
- Born: May 26, 1991 (age 35) Millbury, Ohio

Sport
- Sport: Rowing

Josh Konieczny (born May 26, 1991) is an American competitive rower. Konieczny grew up on a farm in Millbury, Ohio. His uncle was a competitive rower at the University of Wisconsin, which exposed him to the sport as a child. He competed for the Dartmouth Big Green in rowing from 2009 to 2013.

He competed at the 2016 Summer Olympics in Rio de Janeiro, in the men's lightweight double sculls.
