= Will Fletcher =

British rower

Personal information
- Full name: William Fletcher
- Nationality: British
- Born: 24 December 1989 (age 36) Chester-le-Street
- Years active: 2006-2020
Medal record
Men's rowing
Representing Great Britain
World Championships
Silver medal – second place	2015 Aiguebelette	LM2x
Bronze medal – third place	2013 Chungju	LM4-

William Fletcher (born 24 December 1989) is a retired British rower who competed at the 2016 Summer Olympics.

== Education ==
Fletcher studied at Durham University as a member of Hild Bede, graduating with a Modern Languages degree in 2011.

== Rowing career ==
He competed at the 2013 World Rowing Championships in Chungju, where he won a bronze medal as part of the lightweight coxless four with Adam Freeman-Pask, Jono Clegg and Chris Bartley.

He was part of the British team that topped the medal table at the 2015 World Rowing Championships at Lac d'Aiguebelette in France, where he won a silver medal as part of the lightweight double scull with Richard Chambers.

He and Richard Chambers placed seventh in the men's lightweight double sculls event at the 2016 Summer Olympic Games.
