= Hüseyin Kandemir =

Turkish rower (born 1986)

Personal information
- Born: 9 September 1986 (age 39) Adana, Turkey

Sport
- Club: Galatasaray Rowing
Medal record
Men's Rowing
Representing Turkey
World Championships
Bronze medal – third place	2014 Amsterdam	LM8+

Hüseyin Kandemir (born 9 September 1986 in Adana, Turkey) is a Turkish rower. He is a member of Galatasaray Rowing in Istanbul.

He was the member of the bronze-winning team in the lightweight men's eight (LM8+) event at the 2014 World Rowing Championships in Amsterdam, Netherlands.

Kandemir earned a quota spot for 2016 Summer Olympics with his performance at the 2016 FISA European And Final Olympic Qualification Regatta in Lucerne, Switzerland. He will compete in the men's lightweight double sculls event along with his teammate Enes Kuşku.
