= Wang Chunxin =

Chinese rower

Personal information
- Born: 25 November 1997 (age 28)
- Height: 180 cm (5 ft 11 in)
- Weight: 70 kg (154 lb)

Sport
- Sport: Rowing

Wang Chunxin (Simplified Chinese:王 纯鑫, born 25 November 1997) is a Chinese rower from Yingkou. He competed in the men's lightweight double sculls event at the 2016 Summer Olympics.
