= Bernardo Guerrero =

Chilean rower (born 1986)

Personal information
- Born: 10 June 1986 (age 40) Viña del Mar, Chile

Sport
- Sport: Rowing
Medal record
Representing Chile
Pan American Games
Silver medal – second place	2019 Lima	Eights
Bronze medal – third place	2015 Toronto	Eights
South American Games
Silver medal – second place	2014 Santiago	Single sculls

Bernardo Guerrero Díaz (born 10 June 1986) is a Chilean rower who has represented his country in international sporting events. He competed in the men's lightweight double sculls event at the 2016 Summer Olympics.
