= Rowing at the 2013 Summer Universiade =

Rowing at the XXVII Summer Universiade
- Venue: Rowing Centre
- Dates: July 6, 2013 – July 8, 2013

Rowing was contested at the 2013 Summer Universiade from July 6 to 8 at the Rowing Centre in Kazan, Russia.

== Medal summary ==
=== Medal table ===
Rank	Nation	Gold	Silver	Bronze	Total
1	Russia (RUS)*	3	1	3	7
2	Germany (GER)	3	1	0	4
3	Lithuania (LTU)	3	0	0	3
4	Ukraine (UKR)	1	4	3	8
5	Belarus (BLR)	1	1	0	2
5	South Africa (RSA)	1	1	0	2
7	Austria (AUT)	1	0	0	1
8	Italy (ITA)	0	1	2	3
9	France (FRA)	0	1	1	2
10	Czech Republic (CZE)	0	1	0	1
10	Mexico (MEX)	0	1	0	1
10	Poland (POL)	0	1	0	1
13	Hungary (HUN)	0	0	1	1
13	Japan (JPN)	0	0	1	1
13	Latvia (LAT)	0	0	1	1
13	Netherlands (NED)	0	0	1	1
Totals (16 entries)		13	13	13	39

=== Men's events ===
Event	Gold	Silver	Bronze
Single sculls	Mindaugas Griškonis; Lithuania	Patrick Loliger; Mexico	Serhiy Humennyy; Ukraine
Lightweight single sculls	Julius Peschel; Germany	Jerzy Kowalski; Poland	Gabor Csepregi; Hungary
Double sculls	Lithuania (LTU); Rolandas Maščinskas; Saulius Ritter	Ukraine (UKR); Ivan Dovhodko; Oleksandr Nadtoka	Russia (RUS); Dmitriy Khmylnin; Denis Pribyl
Lightweight double sculls	Austria (AUT); Paul Sieber; Bernhard Sieber	Ukraine (UKR); Ihor Khmara; Stanislav Kovalov	Italy (ITA); Simone Molteni; Leone Maria Barbaro
Coxless pair	Russia (RUS); Aleksandr Chaukin; Iurii Pshenichnikov	Ukraine (UKR); Anton Kholyaznykov; Viktor Hrebennikov	France (FRA); Jean Noury; Hugo Laborde
Coxless four	Germany (GER); Jann-Edzard Junkmann; Milan Dzambasevic; Kay Rückbrodt; Alexander-Nicolas Egler	Italy (ITA); Simone Ferrarese; Simone Martini; Mattia Boschelli; Elia Salani	Russia (RUS); Andrey Stolyarov; Vasily Stepanov; Mikhail Belov; Denis Nikiforov
Lightweight coxless four	Germany (GER); Tobias Franzmann; Stefan Wallat; Daniel Wisgott; Lasse Antczak	France (FRA); Morgan Maunoir; Barthélemy Agostini; Clement Fonta; Édouard Jonville	Japan (JPN); Masato Kobayashi; Hirohide Sakagami; Yusuke Sato; Yusaku Araki
Eight	Russia (RUS); Lev Gritsenko; Victor Misyutkin; Rostislav Drozhzhachikh; Georgy Efremenko; Ivan Balandin; Nikolay Balandin; Anton Zarutskiy; Daniil Andrienko; Pavel Safonkin	Ukraine (UKR); Denys Chornyi; Stanislav Chumraiev; Vitalii Tsurkan; Vasyl Zavgorodnii; Ivan Yurchenko; Ivan Futryk; Dmytro Mikhay; Anatolii Radchenko; Vladyslav Nikulin	Netherlands (NED); Hugo van Velzen; Vincent van der Leer; Stef Broenink; Maarten van Blokland; Jonathan Lemaire; Geert Hemminga; Menno van Blitterswijk; Mathew Kleine Punte; Marc Hummelink

=== Women's events ===
Event	Gold	Silver	Bronze
Single sculls	Nataliya Dovhodko; Ukraine	Jitka Antošová; Czech Republic	Elza Gulbe; Latvia
Lightweight single sculls	Kirsten McCann; South Africa	Olga Arkadova; Russia	Eleonora Trivella; Italy
Double sculls	Lithuania (LTU); Donata Vištartaitė; Milda Valčiukaitė	Belarus (BLR); Tatsiana Kukhta; Katsiaryna Shliupskaya	Ukraine (UKR); Anna Kravchenko; Olena Buryak
Lightweight double sculls	Belarus (BLR); Iryna Liaskova; Alena Kryvasheyenka	Germany (GER); Katrin Thoma; Nora Wessel	Russia (RUS); Anna Yazykova; Natalia Varfolomeeva
Coxless four	Russia (RUS); Yulia Pozdnyakova; Oxana Strelkova; Anastasia Karabelshchikova; Alexandra Fedorova	South Africa (RSA); Claire-Louise Bode; Catherine Stark; Kate Christowitz; Holly Jean Norton	Ukraine (UKR); Kateryna Sheremet; Ilona Romanesku; Ievgeniia Nimchenko; Daryna Verkhohliad
