= Jean-Luc Rasamoelina =

Angolan rower

Personal information
- Born: 4 October 1989 (age 36) Luanda, Angola
- Height: 1.80 m (5 ft 11 in)
- Weight: 70 kg (154 lb)

Sport
- Club: Clube Naval de Luanda
Medal record
Men's rowing
Representing Angola
African Olympic Qualifier
Silver medal – second place	2015 Tunis	LM2x
African Championships
Bronze medal – third place	2015 Tunis	LM2x
Bronze medal – third place	2015 Tunis	M2x
Silver medal – second place	2014 Tipaza	LM2x
Silver medal – second place	2014 Tipaza	M2x
Bronze medal – third place	2013 Tunis	LM2x

Jean-Luc Rasamoelina (born 4 October 1989) is an Angolan rower. He competed in the men's lightweight double sculls event at the 2016 Summer Olympics. At the Olympics, Rasamoelina and his partner André Matias finished second in the Men's Lightweight Double Sculls D-Final and 20th overall.
