= João Paulo de Silva =

Angolan sports shooter

João Paulo de Leiria e Silva
Personal information
- Full name: João Paulo de Leiria e Silva
- Nationality: Angolan
- Born: 13 November 1964 (age 61) Luanda, Angola
- Height: 176 cm (5 ft 9 in)
- Weight: 90 kg (198 lb)

Sport
- Country: Angola
- Sport: Shooting
- Event: Trap (TR125)

João Paulo de Leiria e Silva (born 13 November 1964 in Luanda) is an Angolan sport shooter. He became the only sport shooter to represent Angola at the 2000 Summer Olympics, and the second from his country to do so in Olympic history (the first being done by Paulo Morais in Atlanta 1996).

De Silva competed for the Angolan squad in the men's trap at the 2000 Summer Olympics through a Tripartite Commission Invitation. He shuttered the lowest score in the qualifying round with 99 hits out of a possible 125, placing him in last from a field of forty-one shooters.

At the 2016 Summer Olympics in Rio de Janeiro, he competed in the men's trap competition thanks to another Tripartite Commission invitation. He finished 33rd in the qualification round and did not advance. He was the oldest member of Angola's 2016 Olympic team.
