= André Matias =

Angolan rower

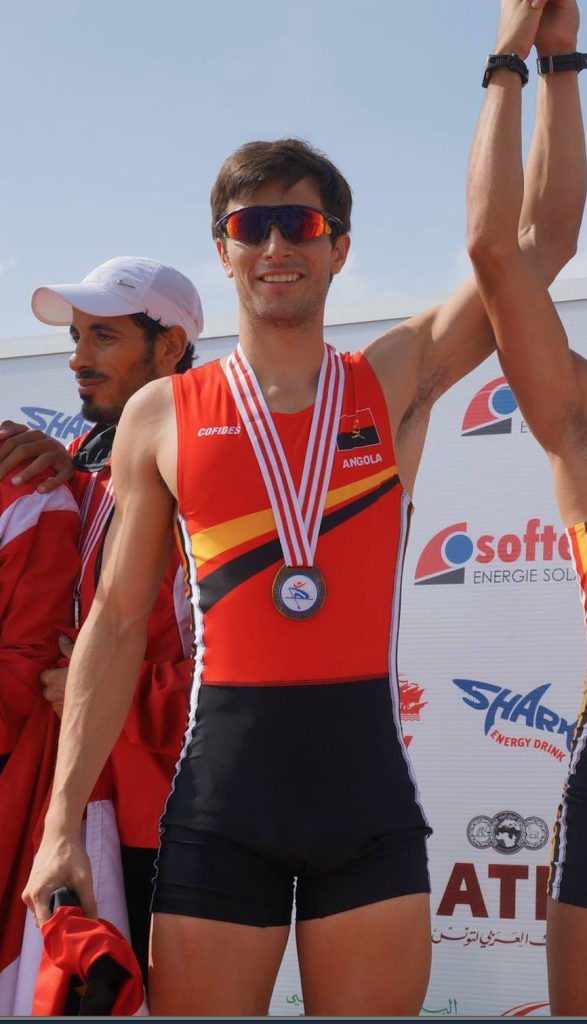
- André Matias winning bronze at the 2013 African Championships

Personal information
- Born: 22 June 1989 (age 37) Luanda, Angola
- Education: Blair Academy; Hamilton College (BA); Georgetown University (JD)
- Height: 1.80 m (5 ft 11 in)
- Weight: 70 kg (154 lb)

Sport
- Club: CN Luanda
Medal record
Men's rowing
Representing Angola
African Olympic Qualifier
| Silver medal – second place | 2015 Tunis | LM2x |
African Championships
| Bronze medal – third place | 2015 Tunis | LM2x |
| Bronze medal – third place | 2015 Tunis | M2x |
| Silver medal – second place | 2014 Tipaza | LM2x |
| Silver medal – second place | 2014 Tipaza | M2x |
| Bronze medal – third place | 2013 Tunis | LM2x |

André Matias (born 22 June 1989) is an Angolan rower. He competed in the men's lightweight double sculls event at the 2016 Summer Olympics. Matias and his partner Jean-Luc Rasamoelina finished second in the Men's Lightweight Double Sculls D-Final at the 2016 Rio Olympics, and 20th overall. He is a graduate of Hamilton College and Georgetown University Law Center.

Born in Angola he has also lived in Portugal where he has family. He lives in Washington D.C.'s Georgetown neighborhood.
