= Felipe Cárdenas =

Chilean rower (born 1991)

Personal information
- Born: 22 July 1991 (age 34) Antofagasta, Chile

Sport
- Sport: Rowing
Medal record
Men's rowing
Representing Chile
Pan American Games
Gold medal – first place	2019 Lima	Lightweight coxless four
Bronze medal – third place	2015 Toronto	Lightweight coxless four
South American Games
Silver medal – second place	2014 Santiago	Coxless fours

Felipe Cárdenas Morales (born 22 July 1991) is a Chilean rower who has represented his country in international competitions. He competed in the men's lightweight double sculls event at the 2016 Summer Olympics.
