= Rowing at the 2014 South American Games =

There were seven rowing events at the 2014 South American Games: two women's events and five men's events.

== Medal summary ==
=== Medal table ===
Rank	Nation	Gold	Silver	Bronze	Total
1	Argentina (ARG)	6	1	0	7
2	Brazil (BRA)	1	1	0	2
3	Chile (CHI)	0	3	3	6
4	Peru (PER)	0	1	2	3
5	Venezuela (VEN)	0	1	1	2
6	Uruguay (URU)	0	0	1	1
Totals (6 entries)		7	7	7	21

=== Medalists ===
Event	Gold	Silver	Bronze
Men's events
Men's single sculls	Brian Rosso; Argentina	Bernardo Guerrero; Chile	Victor Aspillaga; Peru
Men's double sculls	Rodrigo Hernan Murillo; Martin Lasserre; Argentina	Oscar Mauricio Vasquez Ochoa; Felipe Augusto Leal Atero; Chile	Wilfredo Jose Villa; Jaime Antonio Machado; Venezuela
Men's coxless fours	Francisco Esteras; Victor Claus; Agustín Diaz; Joaquín Iwan; Argentina	Nelson Martinez Hodde; Fabian Oyarzun; Felipe Cardenas Morales; Rodrigo Munoz; Chile	Jhonatan Esquivel; Santiago Menese; Angel Garcia Correale; Mauricio Lopez; Uruguay
Men's lightweight double sculls	Alejandro Colomino; Nicolai Fernandez; Argentina	Victor Eulogio Aspillaga Alayza; Renzo Fernando Leon Garcia; Peru	Nivaldo Sebastian Yanez Ortiz; Francisco Gavilan; Chile
Men's lightweight pair	Ariel Suarez; Cristian Alberto Rosso; Argentina	Jackson Vicent; Emilio Jose Torres; Venezuela	Eduardo Gabriel Linares Ruiz; Álvaro Torres; Peru
Women's events
Women's single sculls	Fabiana Beltrame; Brazil	Maria Gabriela Best; Argentina	Antonia Abraham; Chile
Women's lightweight single sculls	Lucia Fernanda Palermo; Argentina	Fabiana Beltrame; Brazil	Josefa Ignacia Vila Betancur; Chile
