= Cem Yılmaz (rower) =

Turkish rower

Personal information
- Born: 3 June 1982 (age 44) Istanbul, Turkey
Medal record
Rowing
Representing Turkey
World Championships
Bronze medal – third place	2014 Amsterdam	LM8+

Cem Yılmaz (born 3 June 1982) is a Turkish Olympian rower, currently competing for Galatasaray Rowing.

He was part of the Turkish men's eight rowing team, which won the bronze medal at the 2014 World Rowing Championships held Bosbaan, Amsterdam, the Netherlands.
