= Hiroshi Nakano (rower) =

Japanese rower (born 1987)

Personal information
- Born: 1 December 1987 (age 38)
- Height: 176 cm (5 ft 9 in)
- Weight: 72 kg (159 lb)

Sport
- Sport: Rowing

Hiroshi Nakano (中野 紘志, Nakano Hiroshi; born 1 December 1987) is a Japanese rower from Ishikawa Prefecture. He competed in the men's lightweight double sculls event at the 2016 Summer Olympics.
