= Galatasaray Rowing =

Galatasaray

- Motto: Çek mastor çek
- Location: Istanbul, Turkey
- Coordinates: 41°00′34.95″N 28°46′20.12″E
- Home water: Lake Küçükçekmece
- Founded: 1873
- Affiliations: Turkish Rowing Federation
- Website: www.galatasaray.org/susporlari/kurek/

Distinctions
- 27 times winners of Turkish Rowing Championship

Galatasaray Rowing Team is the men's and women's rowing section of Galatasaray S.K., a major sports club in Istanbul, Turkey. The club is based at Lake Küçükçekmece, in Kanarya neighborhood west of Istanbul.

İhsan Emre Vural and his teammate Ahmet Yumrukaya became the first world-champions in the history of Turkey when they got first place in the 2004 World Rowing Under 23 Championships held in Poznań, Poland.

In 2013, Galatasaray Rowing Team won Turkish Rowing Championship Cup.

== Technical staff ==
| Name | Nat. | Job |
|---|---|---|
| Mehmet Mumcuoğlu | (Turkey) | Manager, Head Coach |
| Faruk Algür | (Turkey) | Küçükçekmece Rowing Center Director |

== Current squad ==
| Senior – Men's | Junior – Men's | Junior – Women's |
|---|---|---|
| (Turkey) Murat Türker | (Turkey) Ata Şüküroğlu | (Turkey) Gamze Erdem |
| (Turkey) Yücel Mutlu | (Turkey) Barış Güngör | (Turkey) Burcu Kartel |
| (Turkey) Levent Atıl | (Turkey) Barış Kilim | (Turkey) Zeynep Güneri |
| (Turkey) Cem Yılmaz | (Turkey) Burak Bakırhan | (Turkey) Serenay Şenol |
| (Turkey) Barbaros Gözütok | (Turkey) Can Güneri | (Turkey) Gizem Kabinli |
| (Turkey) Ahmet Yumrukaya | (Turkey) Can Horlu | (Turkey) Büşra Taşdelen |
| (Turkey) Uğur Kılıç | (Turkey) Doğukan Çiloğlu | (Turkey) Melis Parlak |
| (Turkey) İsmail Özgür | (Turkey) Emre Ekiz | (Turkey) Elif Beşlioğlu |
| (Turkey) Hakan Özcan | (Turkey) Erdem Öztürk | (Turkey) Büşra Tesbihçi |
| (Turkey) Kaan Şahin | (Turkey) Gökhun Karagöz |
| (Turkey) Bahadır Kaykaç | (Turkey) Gökhan Şahin |
| (Turkey) Bayram Sönmez | (Turkey) Gökhan Elmas |
| (Turkey) Sezgin Günalp | (Turkey) Kadir Bozkurt |
| (Turkey) Burak Yıldırım | (Turkey) Muhammed Canşi |
| (Turkey) Mehmet Keskin | (Turkey) Özkan Özkara |
| (Turkey) Sina Talebi | (Turkey) Recep Ağyar |
| (Turkey) Doğancan Gür | (Turkey) Samet Üçtepe |
| (Turkey) Ozan Saygi | (Turkey) Serhat Kayabaşı |
| (Turkey) | (Turkey) Umut Yeşil |
| (Turkey) | (Turkey) Caner Çelik |
| (Turkey) | (Turkey) Deniz Karadayı |

== Domestic Success ==
- Turkish Rowing Championship:
  - Winners (27): 1953, 1954, 1956, 1957, 1958, 1959, 1966, 1967, 1970, 1971, 1972, 1973, 1974, 1975, 1987, 1988, 1989, 1992, 1994, 2000, 2007, 2009, 2010, 2012, 2013, 2015, 2016.
- Istanbul Championship:
  - Winners (32):1927, 1929, 1930, 1933, 1934, 1935, 1937, 1941, 1942, 1943, 1944, 1945, 1946, 1950, 1952, 1953, 1956, 1957, 1959, 1966, 1967, 1968, 1970, 1971, 1972, 1989, 1990, 1991, 1992, 1993, 2003.
- Turkish Cup:
  - Winners (10): 1987, 1988, 1989, 1992, 1994, 2004, 2010, 2013, 2015, 2018.
