= Rowing at the Summer World University Games =

- Events: 14 (men: 7; women: 7)

Games
- 1959; 1960; 1961; 1962; 1963; 1964; 1965; 1966; 1967; 1968; 1970; 1970; 1973; 1972; 1975; 1975; 1977; 1978; 1979; 1981; 1983; 1985; 1987; 1989; 1991; 1993; 1995; 1997; 1999; 2001; 2003; 2005; 2007; 2009; 2011; 2013; 2015; 2017; 2019; 2021; 2025

Rowing is an Universiade optional sport since the 1987 in Zagreb, Yugoslavia. After this, rowing was an optional sport at the 1989, 1993, 2013 and 2015 editions. The sport returned with the same status at the 2021 Summer Universiade, which were held in Chengdu, China, and was also chosen with same status to the subsequent editions scheduled for the 2025 Summer Universiade, to be held in Duisburg, Germany and the 2027 Summer Universiade, to be held in Chungcheong Province, South Korea.

== Editions ==
Games	Year	Host city	Host country	Winner	Second	Third
XIV	1987	Zagreb	Yugoslavia	Romania	Italy	West Germany
XV	1989	Duisburg	West Germany	Romania	China; West Germany	
XVII	1993	St. Catharines	Canada	Canada	Romania	United States
XXVII	2013	Kazan	Russia	Russia	Germany	Lithuania
XXVIII	2015	Tangeum Lake	South Korea	Lithuania	Japan	Ukraine
XXXI	2021	Chengdu	China	China	Poland	Italy
XXXII	2025	Duisburg	Germany	United Kingdom	Netherlands	Italy
XXXIII	2027	Tangeum Lake	South Korea			

== Medal table ==
Last updated after the 2025 Summer Universiade

Rank	Nation	Gold	Silver	Bronze	Total
1	Romania (ROM)	13	2	0	15
2	Lithuania (LTU)	11	2	2	15
3	Italy (ITA)	9	12	12	33
4	China (CHN)	9	5	6	20
5	Germany (GER)	5	9	6	20
6	Canada (CAN)	5	8	7	20
7	Netherlands (NED)	5	6	12	23
8	Poland (POL)	5	6	4	15
9	Ukraine (UKR)	3	8	3	14
10	West Germany (FRG)	3	5	2	10
11	Great Britain (GBR)	3	4	3	10
12	Bulgaria (BUL)	3	3	1	7
13	Russia (RUS)	3	1	3	7
14	United States (USA)	2	5	6	13
15	Soviet Union (URS)	2	3	0	5
16	Japan (JPN)	2	1	2	5
17	Czech Republic (CZE)	2	1	1	4
18	South Africa (RSA)	1	3	1	5
19	France (FRA)	1	2	4	7
20	Belarus (BLR)	1	1	1	3
21	Hungary (HUN)	1	0	3	4
22	East Germany (GDR)	1	0	2	3
22	Turkey (TUR)	1	0	2	3
24	Moldova (MDA)	1	0	1	2
25	Austria (AUT)	1	0	0	1
25	Finland (FIN)	1	0	0	1
27	Spain (ESP)	0	2	1	3
28	Yugoslavia (YUG)	0	1	2	3
29	New Zealand (NZL)	0	1	1	2
30	Brazil (BRA)	0	1	0	1
30	Croatia (CRO)	0	1	0	1
30	Iran (IRI)	0	1	0	1
30	Mexico (MEX)	0	1	0	1
34	Australia (AUS)	0	0	1	1
34	Azerbaijan (AZE)	0	0	1	1
34	Belgium (BEL)	0	0	1	1
34	Greece (GRE)	0	0	1	1
34	Latvia (LAT)	0	0	1	1
Totals (38 entries)		94	95	93	282

== See also ==
- World University Rowing Championships
