= African Rowing Championships =

International rowing event

- Status: Active
- Genre: Rowing African championship
- Date: Varying
- Frequency: Bi-annual
- Country: Varying
- Inaugurated: 1993
- Most recent: 2025
- Next event: 2026
- Organiser: FASA

The African Rowing Championships is an international rowing regatta organized by African Rowing Federation (FASA). It's for competitors from the African countries.

== Editions ==
African Rowing Championships have been held since 1993.

#	Year	Host city	Host country	Date	Nations	Events	Best nation
1	1993	Cairo	Egypt	...–... December	3		
2	1995		South Africa	...–... March	3		
3	1998	Cairo	Egypt	...–... December	6		
4	2000	Pretoria	South Africa	...–... March	6		
5	2002	Cairo	Egypt	...–... October	6		
6	2005	Tunis	Tunisia	24–25 September	16		Egypt
7	2010	Tunis	Tunisia	1–3 July	13		Egypt
8	2012	Alexandria	Egypt	30 November–2 December	9		
9	2013	Tunis	Tunisia	1–4 October	19	9	Algeria
10	2014	Tipaza	Algeria	16–18 October		9	Algeria
11	2015	Tunis	Tunisia	9–11 October		9	Algeria
12	2017	Tunis	Tunisia	20–22 October		7	Algeria
13	2019	Tunis	Tunisia	14–16 October		8	Tunisia
14	2022	El Alamein	Egypt	16–18 December	12	8	Algeria
15	2023	Tunis	Tunisia	23–26 October		8	Egypt
16	2024	El Alamein	Egypt	8–9 November			
17	2025	Tshwane	South Africa	1–2 November			South Africa
18	2026	Tunis	Tunisia	29–30 September			Tunisia
