= Bernhard Sieber =

Austrian rower

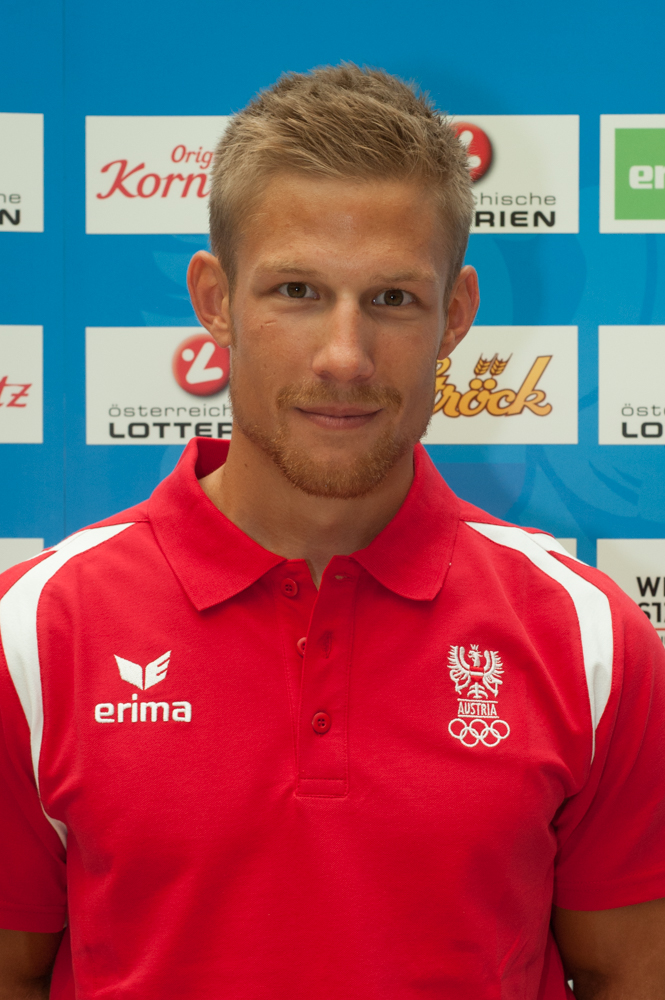
- Sieber in 2016

Personal information
- Born: 6 August 1990 (age 35)
- Height: 180 cm (5 ft 11 in)
- Weight: 72 kg (159 lb)

Sport
- Sport: Rowing

Bernhard Sieber (born 6 August 1990) is an Austrian rower. He competed in the men's lightweight double sculls event at the 2016 Summer Olympics.
