= Paul Sieber =

Austrian rower

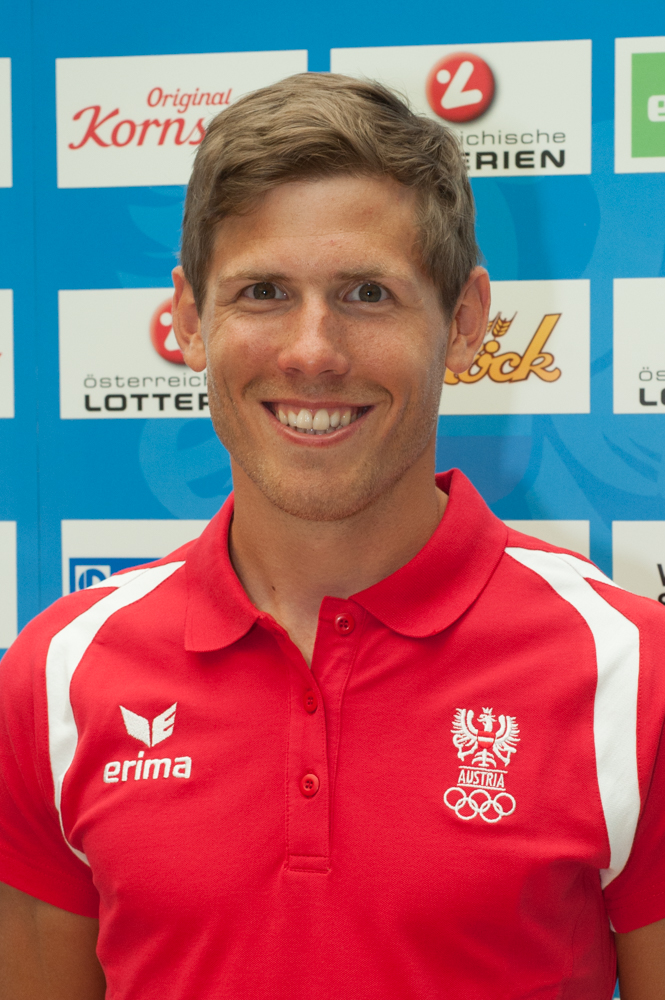
- Sieber in 2016

Personal information
- Born: 12 February 1993 (age 33)
- Height: 177 cm (5 ft 10 in)
- Weight: 70 kg (154 lb)

Sport
- Sport: Rowing

Paul Sieber (born 12 February 1993) is an Austrian rower. He competed in the men's lightweight double sculls event at the 2016 Summer Olympics.
