= 2025 World Rowing Championships – Men's lightweight double sculls =

Men's lightweight double sculls at the 2025 World Rowing Championships
- Venue: Dianshan Lake
- Location: Shanghai, China
- Dates: 21–25 September
- Competitors: 8 from 4 nations

Medalists
| gold medal | Li Yawei; Sun Man | China |
| silver medal | Ali Mardiansyah; Rafiq Wijdan Yasir | Indonesia |
| bronze medal | Joachim Agne; Paul Maissenhälter | Germany |

The men's lightweight double sculls competition at the 2025 World Rowing Championships took place at Dianshan Lake, in Shanghai.

== Schedule ==
The schedule was as follows:

| Date | Time | Round |
|---|---|---|
| Sunday 21 September 2025 | 10:11 | Preliminary race |
| Thursday, 25 September 2025 | 14:16 | Final A |

All times are UTC+08:00

== Results ==
=== Preliminary round ===
All boats advanced to the final.

| Rank | Rower | Country | Time | Notes |
|---|---|---|---|---|
| 1 | Li Yawei; Sun Man | China | 6:23.22 | FA |
| 2 | Ali Mardiansyah; Rafiq Wijdan Yasir | Indonesia | 6:25.84 | FA |
| 3 | Joachim Agne; Paul Maissenhälter | Germany | 6:37.75 | FA |
| 4 | Davit Lashkareishvili; Giorgi Kanteladze | Georgia | 6:50.90 | FA |

=== Final ===
The final took place at 14:16 on 25 September.

| Rank | Rower | Country | Time | Notes |
|---|---|---|---|---|
| 1st place, gold medalist(s) | Li Yawei; Sun Man | China | 6:44.90 | |
| 2nd place, silver medalist(s) | Ali Mardiansyah; Rafiq Wijdan Yasir | Indonesia | 6:47.40 | |
| 3rd place, bronze medalist(s) | Joachim Agne; Paul Maissenhälter | Germany | 6:50.24 | |
| 4 | Davit Lashkareishvili; Giorgi Kanteladze | Georgia | 8:25.40 | |
