= Nivy Station =

Nivy Station Stanica Nivy
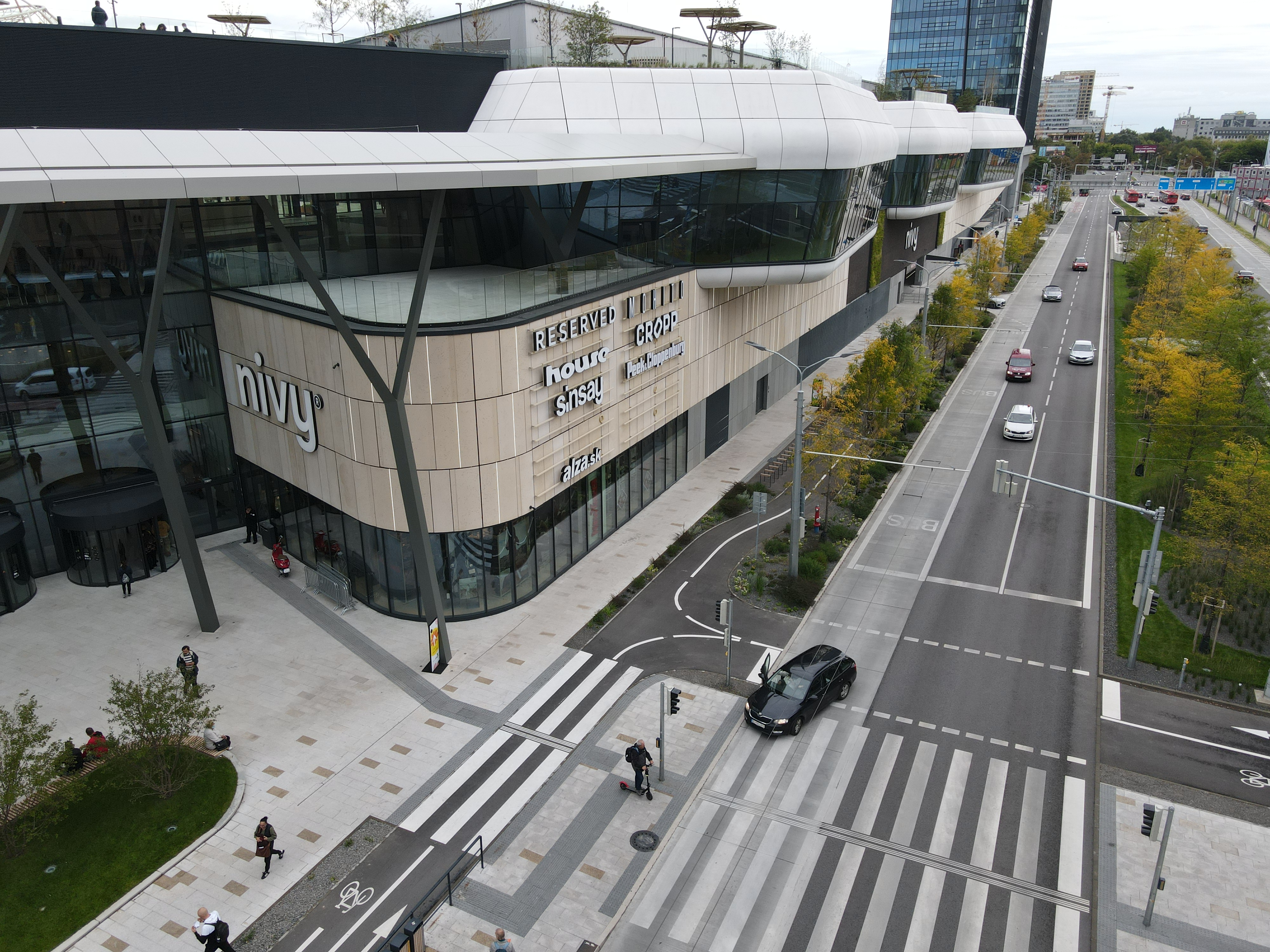
- The main entrance to Nivy Station from Mlynské nivy

General information
- Location: Nivy, Ružinov; Slovakia
- Coordinates: 48.146723°N 17.128496°E
- System: Bus station/Mixed-use development

Construction
- Platform levels: 7
- Parking: 2,000 parking spots
- Architect: SIEBERT + TALAŠ

Other information
- Status: Staffed

History
- Opened: 30 September 2021
Location

Nivy Station (Slovak: Stanica Nivy), also known as Nivy Centrum, Bus station Nivy (Slovak: Autobusová stanica Nivy), or simply Nivy, is a multifunctional building consisting of a bus station, a shopping center and a market on Mlynské nivy street in Nivy, Ružinov, a borough of Bratislava, Slovakia. The building is located on the site of the original Bratislava Central Bus Station, which was demolished at the end of 2017, and the tentative completion date was originally set for 2020. Due to the COVID-19 pandemic, the grand opening took place on 30 September 2021. At 3:00 am, the first bus left the station. The construction was carried out by the company HB Reavis, which also constructed a new urban zone called Nové Nivy, in which the complex is located.

== Characteristics ==
The building has five floors above ground and two underground. On the first underground floor, the station itself uses approximately 30,000 square metres (320,000 sq ft), and on the second, a parking lot. The bus station has more than 2,000 parking spaces, about half of them are in the basement. The building houses bus platforms and cash registers, commercial establishments, a market, and services on three floors and the green roof of the building. On the edge of the complex is a 125-metre (410 ft) tall office building called Nivy Tower, which is the second tallest building in Slovakia. Next to the complex, under the reconstructed Mlynské nivy street, is the first underground roundabout in Slovakia, which was launched together with the opening of the Nivy Station building.

== Photo gallery ==
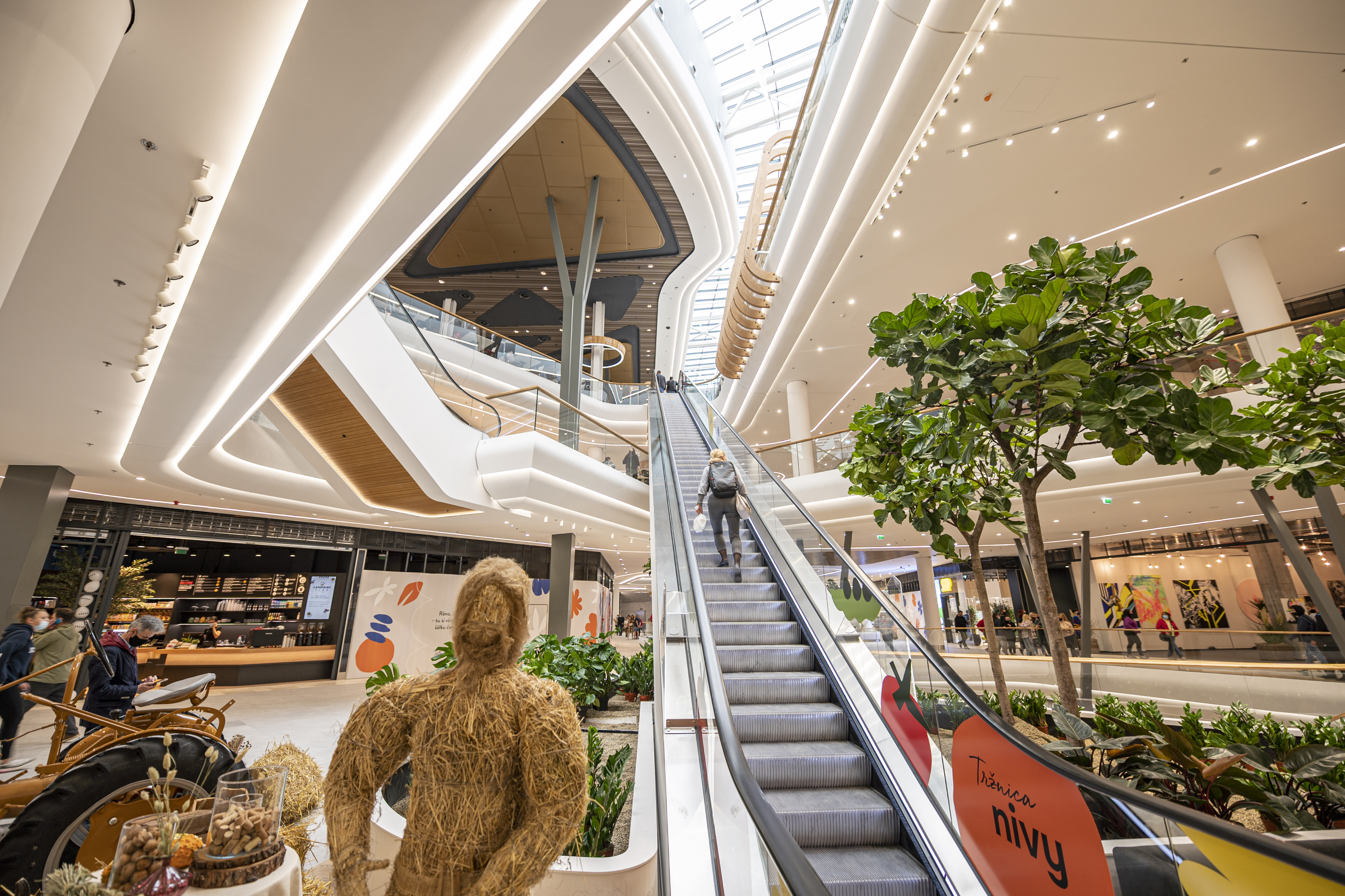
Interior of the station

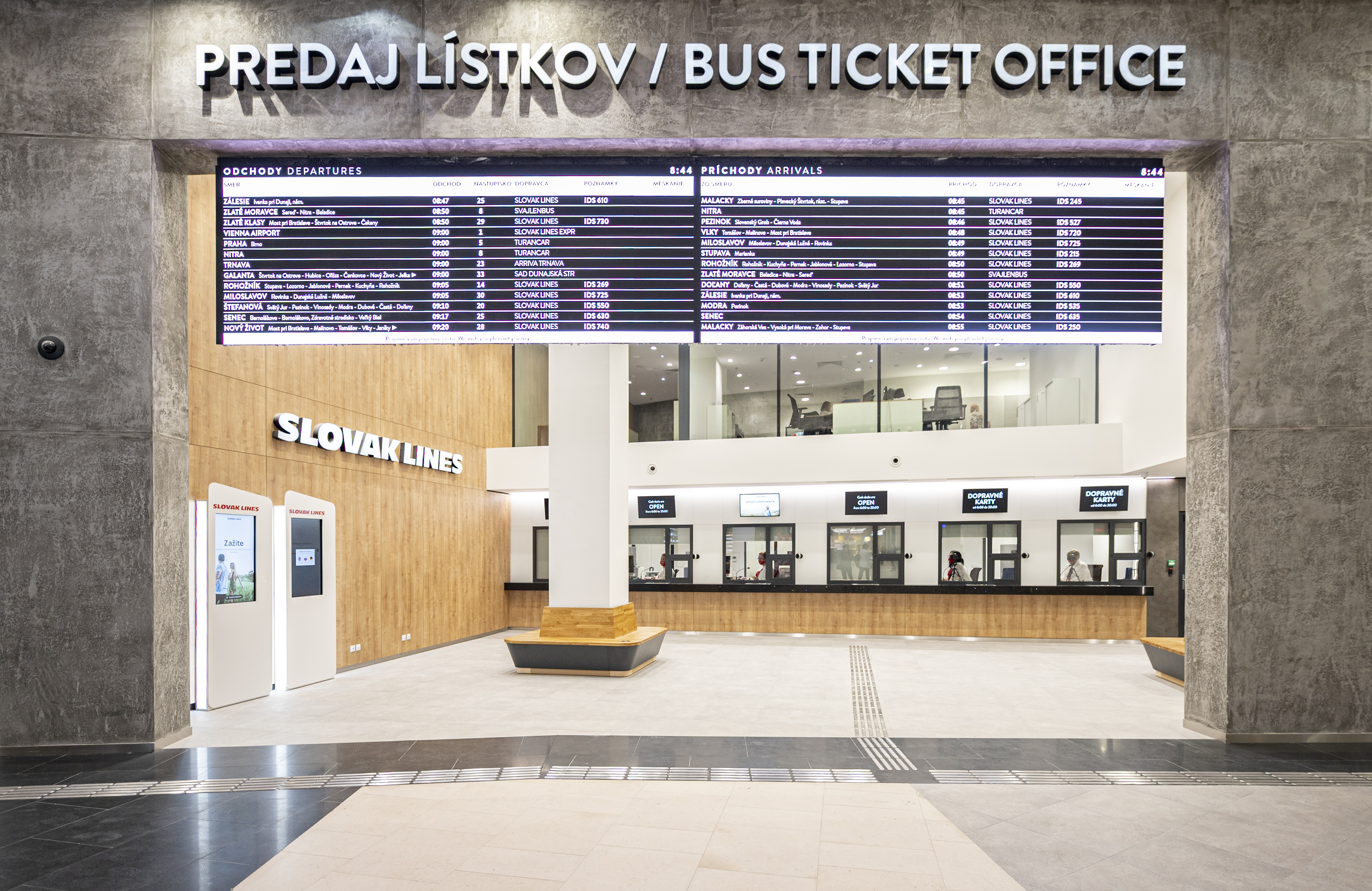
Bus ticket office

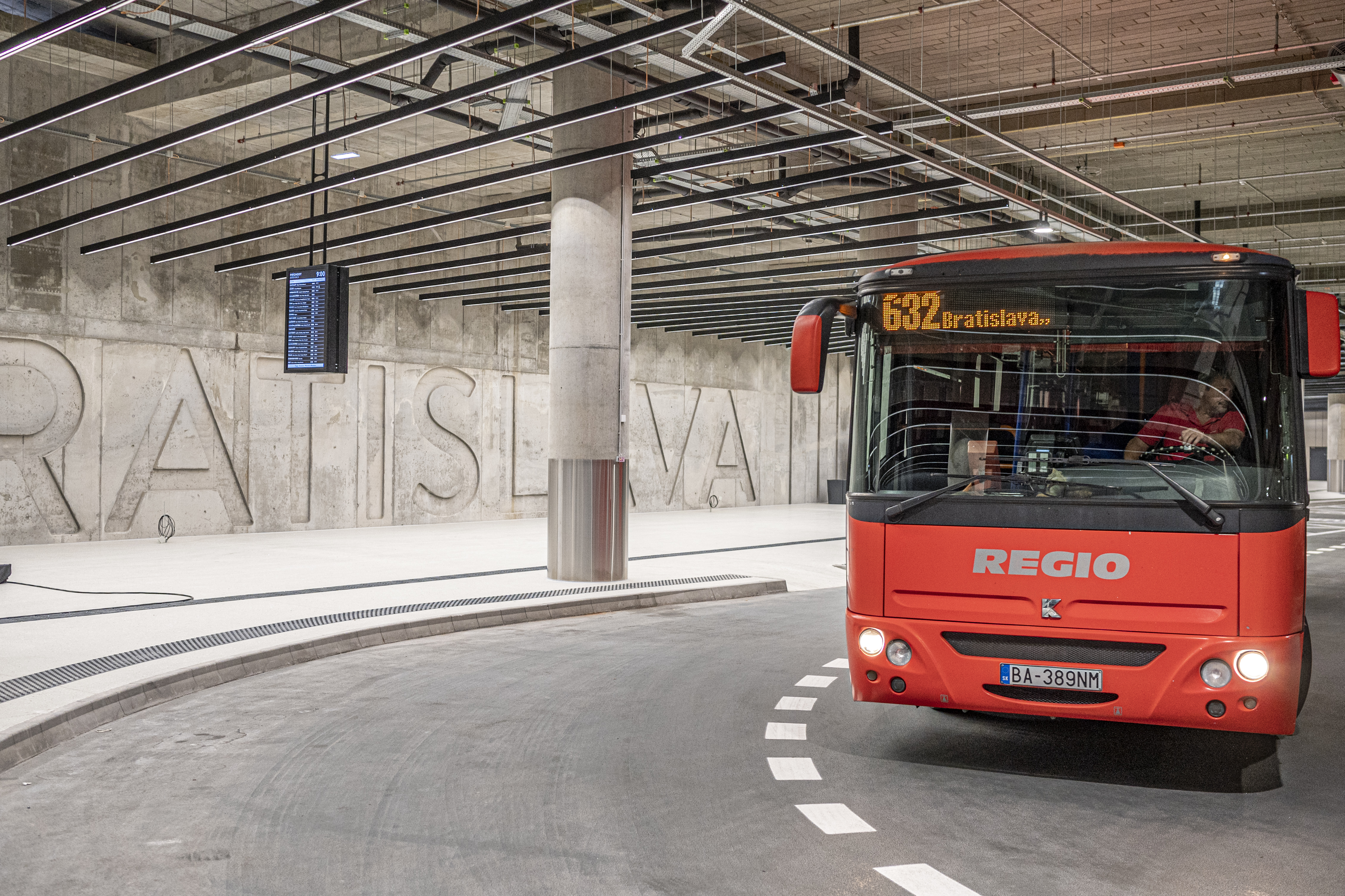
Bus station on the first underground floor

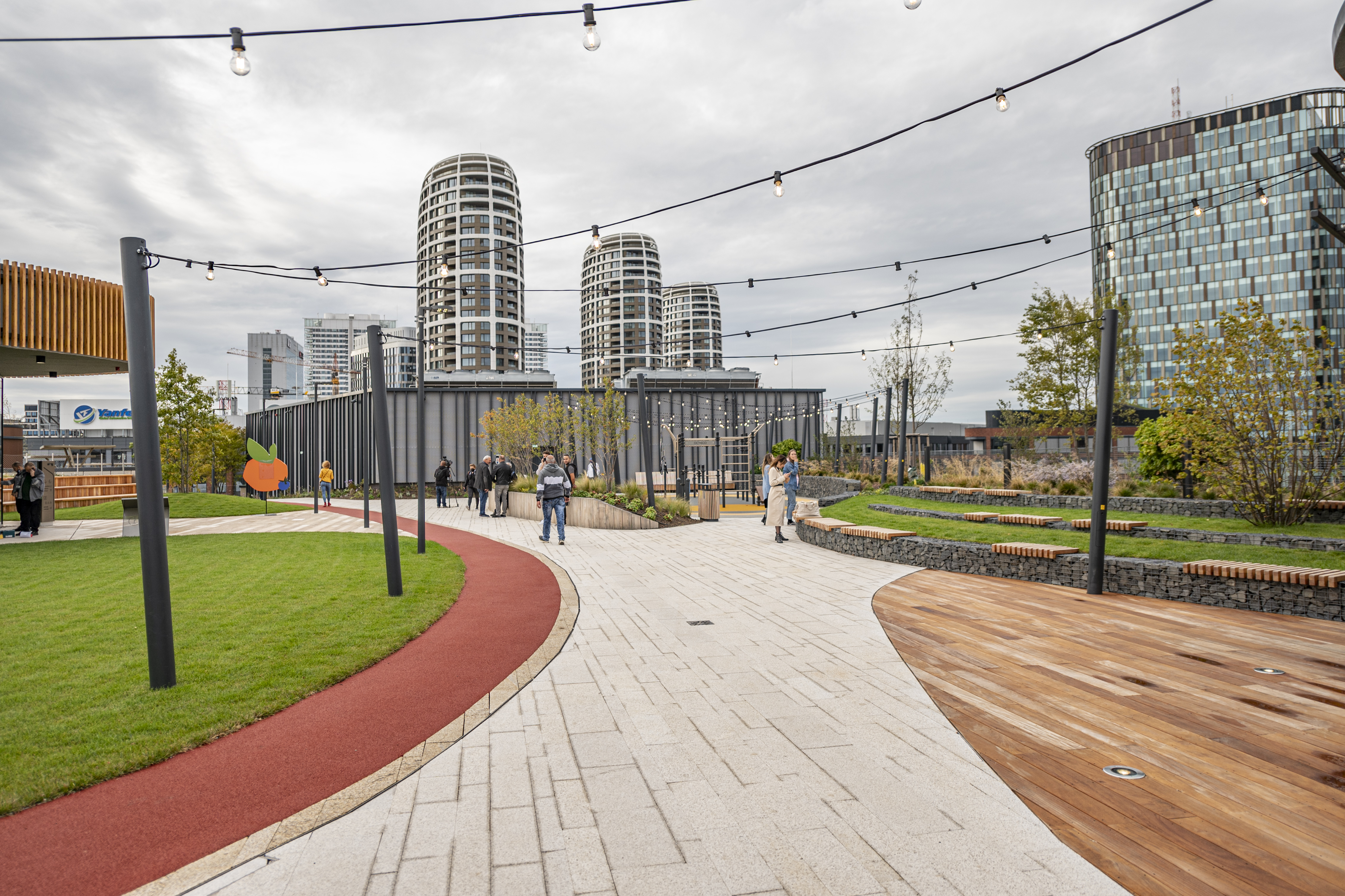
Green roof with landscaping

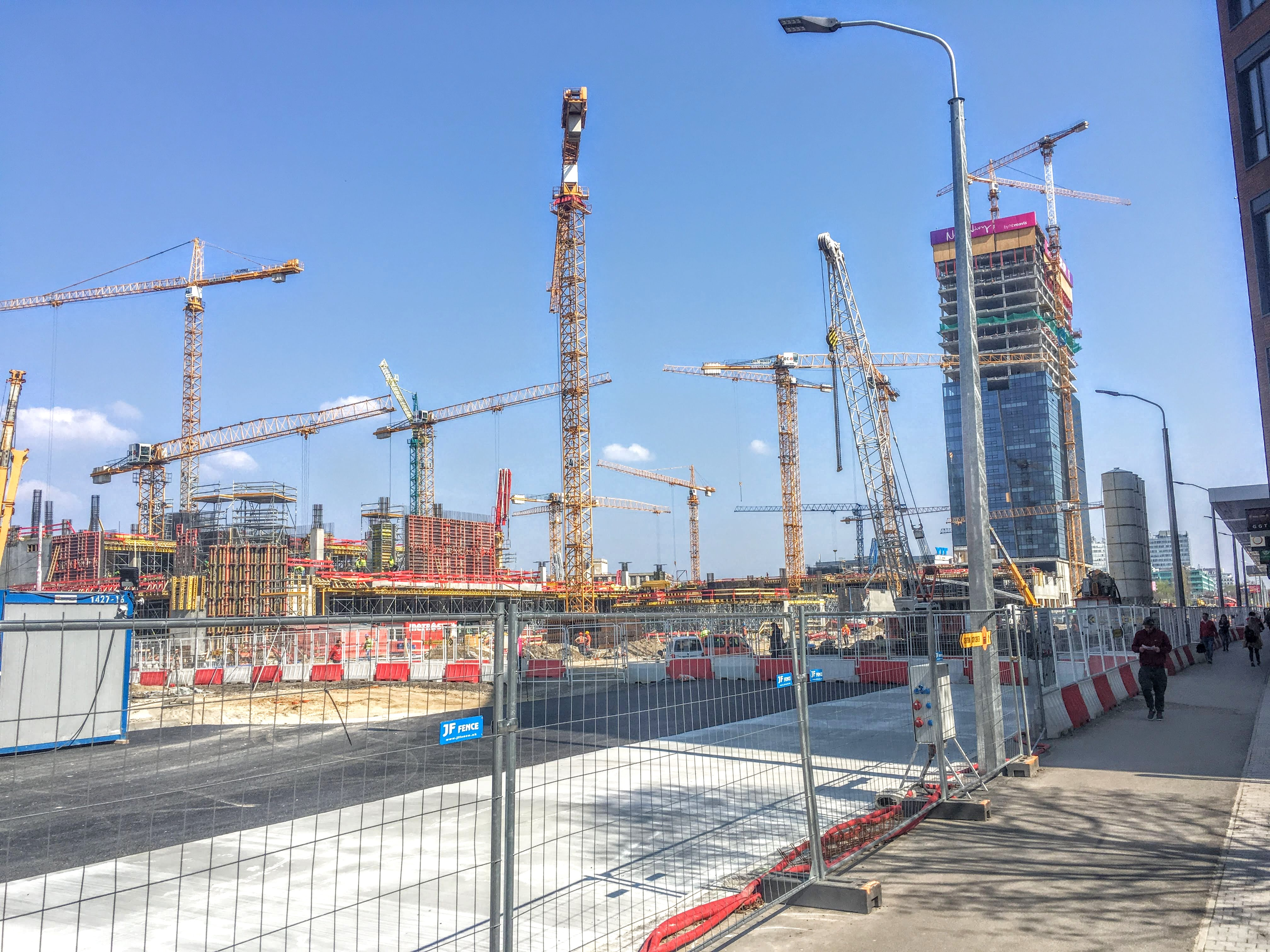
Construction of the bus station
