= Central (shopping mall) =

Coordinates: 48°09′26″N 17°07′47″E

Centrál
- Location: Ružinov, Bratislava, Slovakia
- Address: Metodova 6
- Opened: 18 October 2012
- Developer: Immocap
- Owner: Allianz Real Estate
- Num. of stores: 150
- Floor area: 36 000 m2
- Floors: 4
- Parking: Underground garage (1300 spaces)
- Website: www.central.sk

Centrál is a shopping centre (shopping mall and entertainment centre) in the Ružinov borough of Bratislava, Slovakia. It was the sixth major modern shopping centre built in Bratislava, Polus City Center being the first. It opened on 18 October 2012, and it is the eighth biggest shopping mall in Slovakia with total shopping space of 36,000 m^{2}.

Centrál is situated in the centre of Bratislava with many public transit routes (buses, trams) having stops nearby. It is its location that gave the shopping mall its name Centrál (being located in the centre of the city) and it is often considered the heart of the capital. It is easily accessible by car (highway D1 has a few exits in close proximity) or by the public transit.

== History ==
The area of the Centrál shopping mall was previously occupied by Central Baths, built in 1987. The construction of these baths, which started in 1973, lasted longer than the public use of the baths themselves. The original plan counted also with the construction of apartment buildings, however this plan was later dismissed. The baths have been abandoned and deteriorating since the 1990s.

The project to build a new shopping mall was introduced in 2005 by the development company Immocap Group and four years later the construction works began. The whole process from laying the first brick until the last finishing touches took 34 months. The project included also the construction of a 15-floor hotel Lindner with 222 rooms, an administrative tower with 16 000 m2 office space and a smaller adjacent building that was later claimed by a health clinic ProCare. The total costs as of the day of completion reached 200 million euros.

The shopping mall was opened in autumn 2012 and apart from the retail space it also houses restaurants, cafes and a fitness centre with a 25 meters long swimming pool. The roof of the mall is open to the public too. It is used as a park and includes a small playground for children. Its total area is 6 000 m2.

In 2016, Allianz Real Estate acquired Centrál from Immocap for 175 million EUR, which made it the most expensive transaction on the real estate market in Slovakia for that year.
