= Bratislava Central Bus Station =

Bus station in Bratislava, Slovakia

Bratislava Central Bus Station Autobusová stanica Mlynské nivy
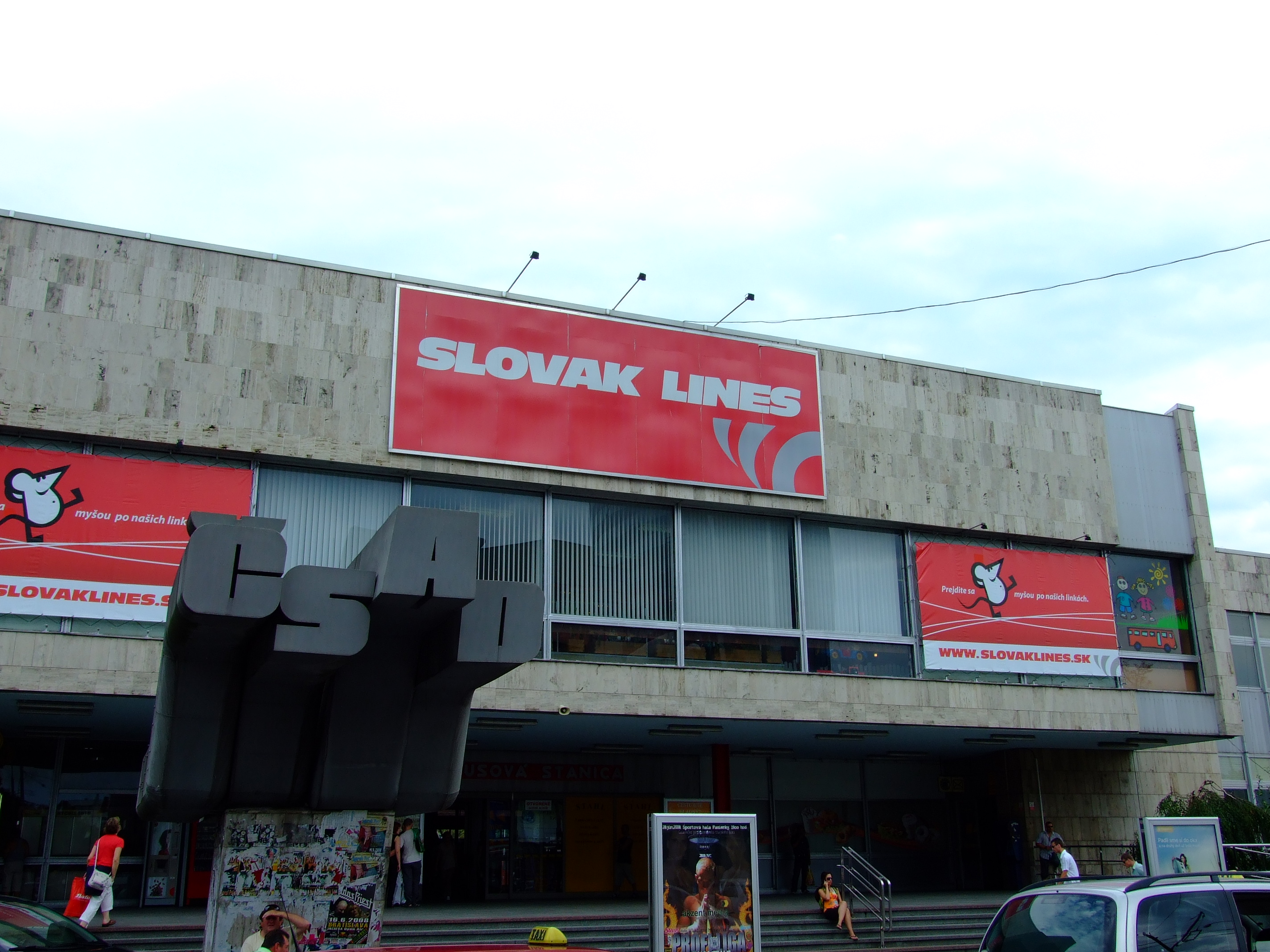
- Main entrance of the original (now demolished) station building. The "ČSAD" sculpture is now located at the Nová Cvernovka cultural centre.

General information
- Location: Mlynské Nivy 31, Nivy, Bratislava; Ružinov; Slovakia
- Coordinates: 48°8′49″N 17°7′37″E
- System: bus terminal
- Operator: Twin City
- Bus operators: Slovak Lines; Eurolines; Student Agency; Turancar

History
- Opened: 1983
- Closed: 2018
Location

Bratislava Central Bus Station (Slovak: Autobusová stanica Mlynské nivy) was the main bus transport interchange in Bratislava, the capital of Slovakia. It served both domestic and international intercity bus service. The station building was constructed from 1975 to 1983 in the Nivy neighborhood of the Ružinov borough. It was opened on 15 August 1983 and closed for redevelopment in 2018. The author of the building design and original interior is Valéria Triznová. The station featured numerous shops, fast food kiosks and a restaurant. The bus stands were open 24/7 and the station building closed at 23:00 each night and opened at 04:00 the next day.

Slovak real-estate development company HB Reavis bought the building to redevelop it as part of its Stanica Nivy project, itself part of a larger development called the Twin City. Construction started in 2018 and finished on 30 September 2021. During construction, a temporary bus terminal was established nearby on Bottova Street.

After less than 4 years of construction (over 1 year lost due to Covid restriction, including months with ban on interior shopping), new modern Bratislava's Nivy bus station was inaugurated on 30 September 2021.

== Name ==
In Slovak the station is called Autobusová stanica Mlynské nivy, Autobusová stanica Bratislava Nivy, AS Mlynské nivy or AS Bratislava Nivy. In English it is called The Central Bus Station.

== Image gallery ==
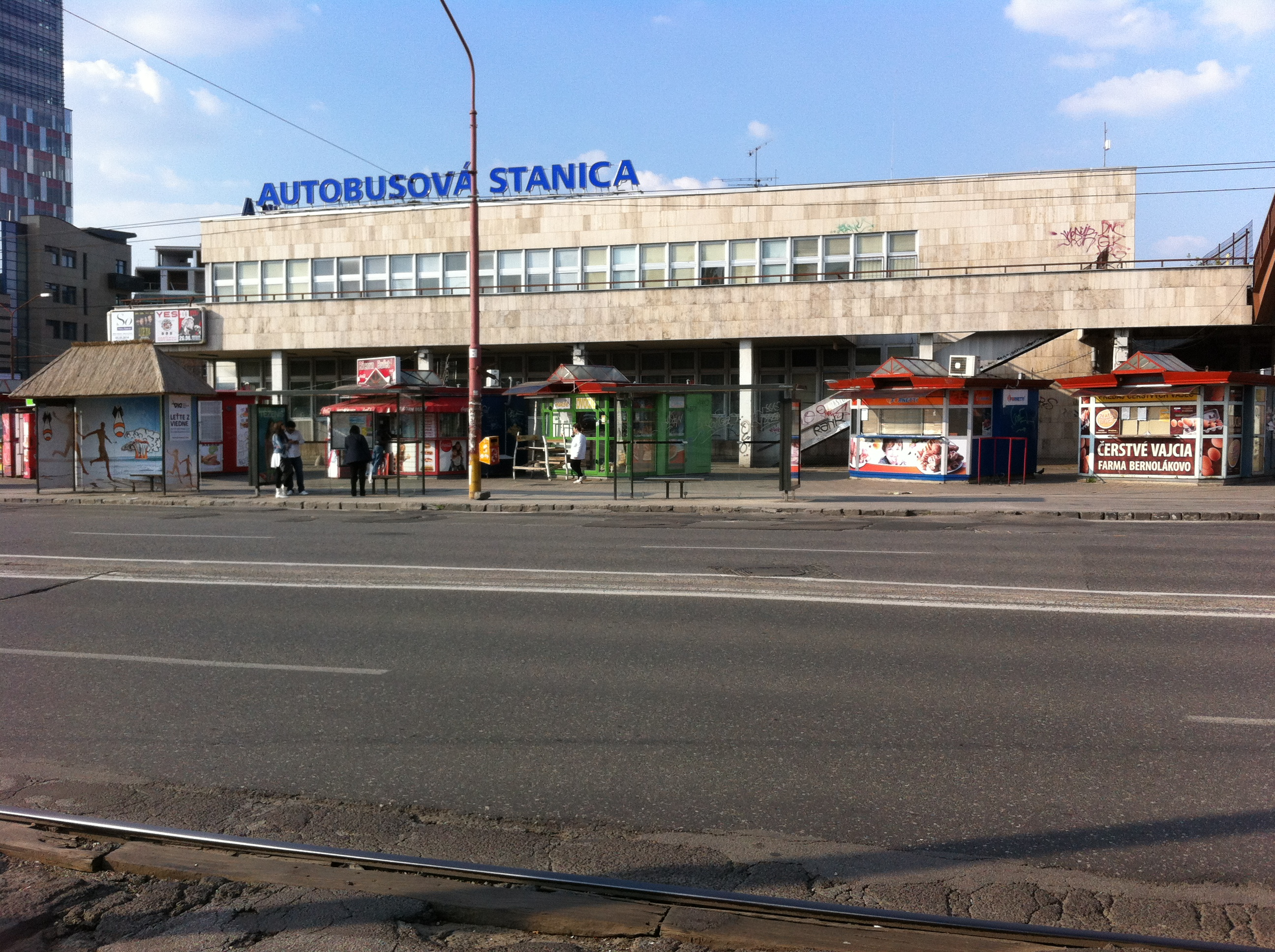
View of the station

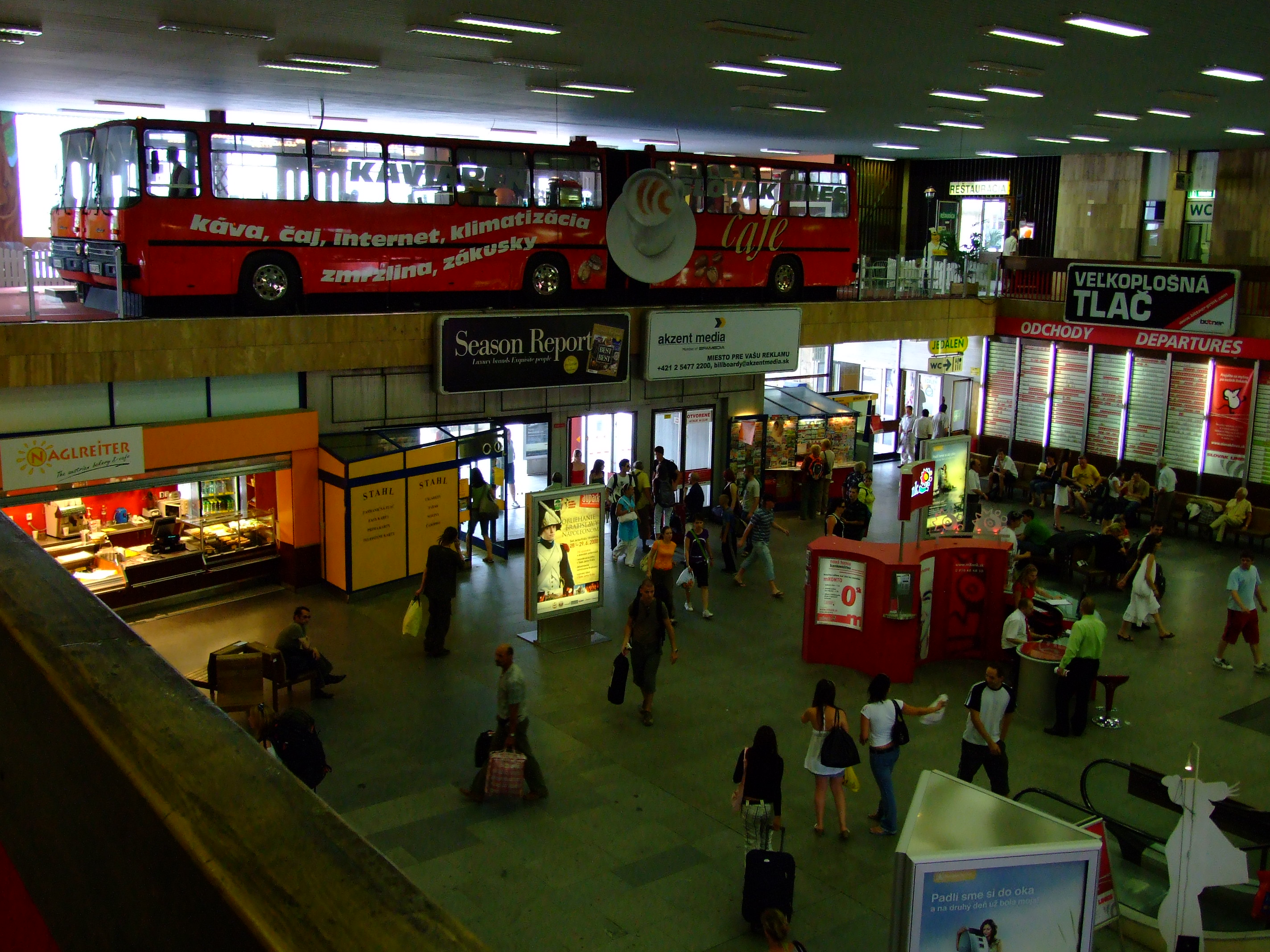
Interior of the bus station

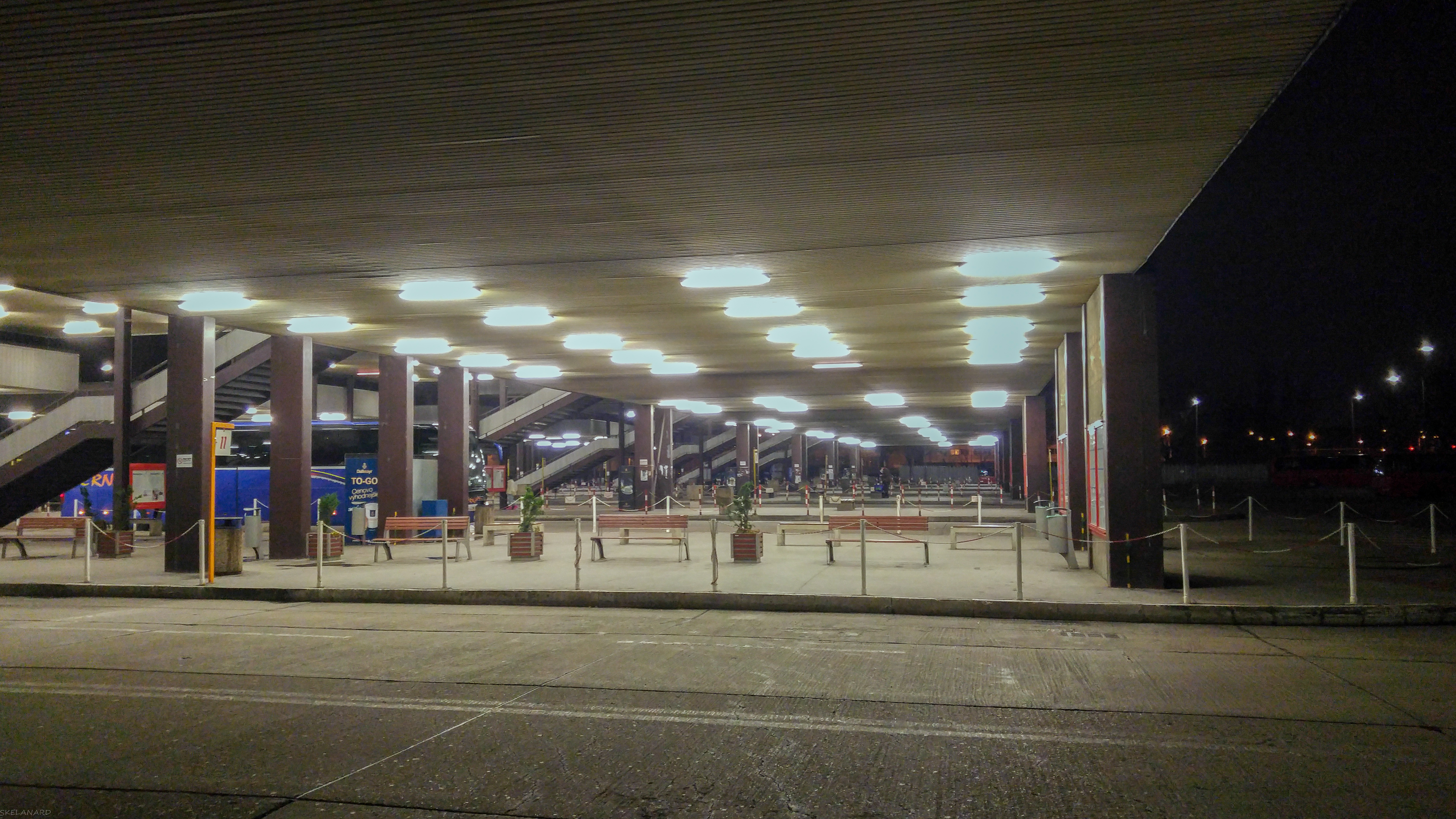
Bus platforms

== See also ==
- Transport in Bratislava
