= Nivy =

Coordinates: 48°09′N 17°08′E

- Neighborhood of Bratislava
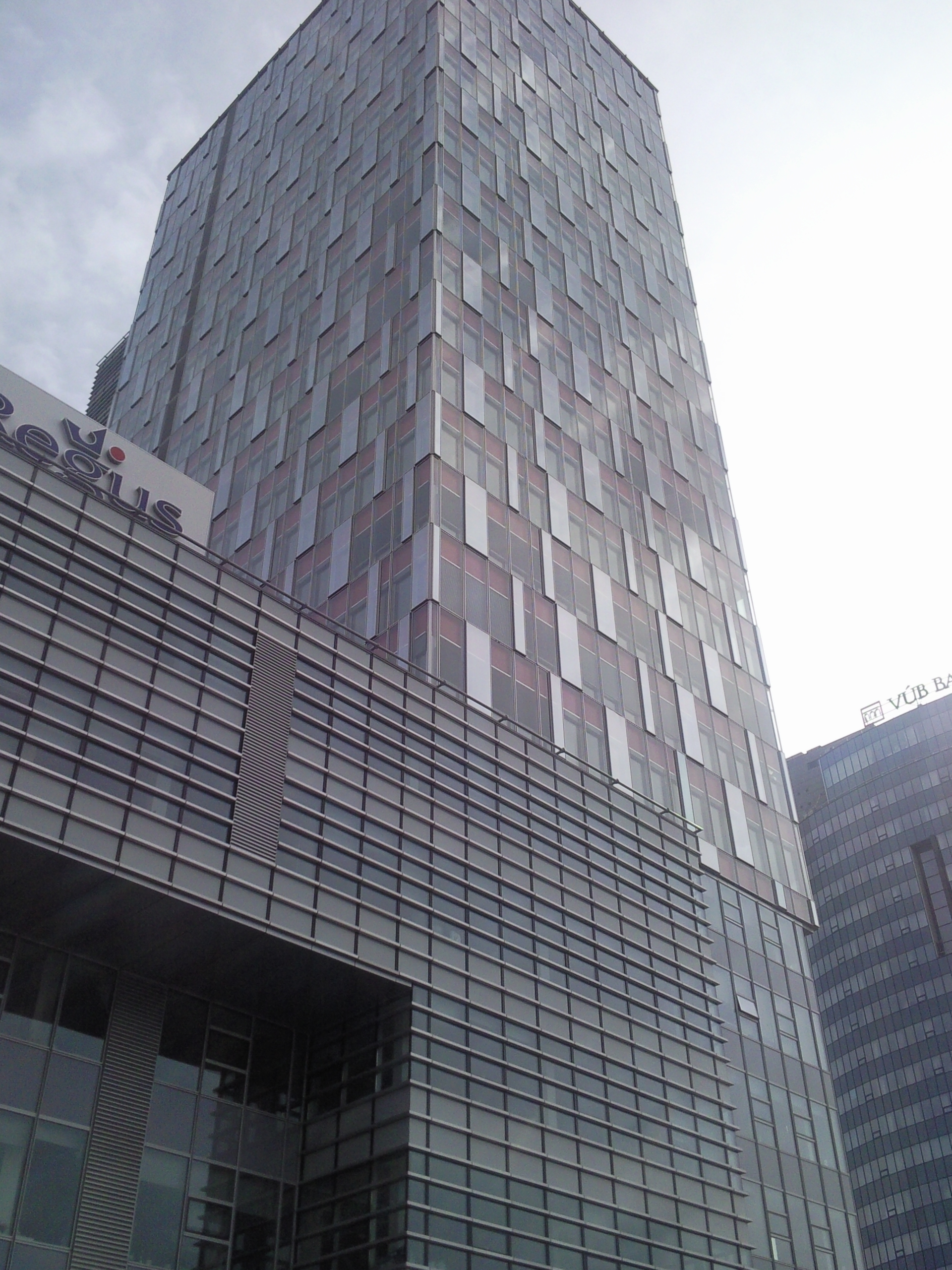
- City Business Center at Nivy
- Interactive map of Nivy
- Country: Slovakia
- Region: Bratislava Region
- City: Bratislava
- Borough: Ružinov
- Postal code (PSČ): 821 08, 821 09
- Telephone area code: (+421) 2

Nivy (literally: Floodplains) is a neighborhood of the Ružinov borough of Bratislava, the capital of Slovakia, located in the Bratislava II district. At the end of the 19th century, the area underwent massive industrialization becoming the first industrial part of Bratislava. In the 1950s to 1970s, the area was redeveloped into a residential suburb. At the end of the 20th century large-scale construction of office buildings started again to change the character of the neighborhood and in the 21st century, Nivy became the location of the emerging new city centre of Bratislava. It is an important transport hub featuring the Nivy Station.

One of the key issues of urban development in Bratislava lies in the redevelopment of brownfield sites adjoining the old city centre which are located in the Nivy neighborhood.

== Location and division ==
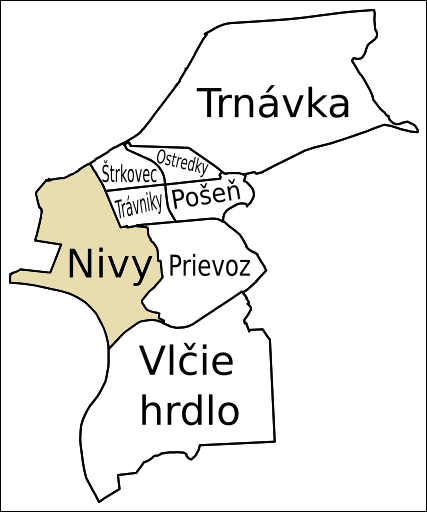
Location of the Nivy neighborhood within the Ružinov borough of Bratislava

The area of Nivy is delimited by Karadžičova Street from the west, Krížna Street and Trnavská cesta Street from the north, Bajkalská Street and Hraničná Street from the east and the Winter Harbor of the Port of Bratislava from the south. It borders the Štrkovec neighborhood, Trávniky neighborhood and Prievoz neighborhood of Ružinov from the east, the Vlčie hrdlo neighborhood of Ružinov from the south, the borough of Old Town from the west and the borough of Nové Mesto from the north.

The Nivy neighborhood features the following local areas (Slovak: miestna časť):

- 500 apartments development (Slovak: Sídlisko 500 bytov) - was the first planned large-scale housing development in Bratislava built as a reaction to sharply rising demands for living spaces in the city after Second World War. Construction started in 1949 around Svätoplukova Street and Budovateľská Street according to project by A. Daríček. The area consists of a colony of residential brick buildings three floors in height built next to each other featuring small-size apartments. It was originally located within the borders of Revúcka Street, Velehradská Street, Pavlovova Street, Súťažná Street, Azovská Street, Svätoplukova Street and partially Budovateľská Street. Sídlisko 500 bytov is a purely residential area that features the House of Culture Cultus Nivy.
- Košická development (Slovak: Sídlisko Košická)
- Old Ružinov (Slovak: Starý Ružinov)
- Ružová dolina (Slovak: Ružová dolina)
- Mlynské Nivy - West Zone (Slovak: Zóna Mlynské Nivy - Západ)
- Mlynské Nivy - East Zone (Slovak: Zóna Mlynské Nivy - Východ)
- Chalupkova Zone (Slovak: Zóna Chalupkova)

== History ==
The central area of Nivy around today's Dulovo Square was historically undeveloped and it served mainly for growing fruits and vegetables by wealthy farmers for sale at Bratislava's markets. At the end of the 19th century, the Thread factory (Slovak: Cvernovka) was built on Páričkova Street.

== Gallery ==
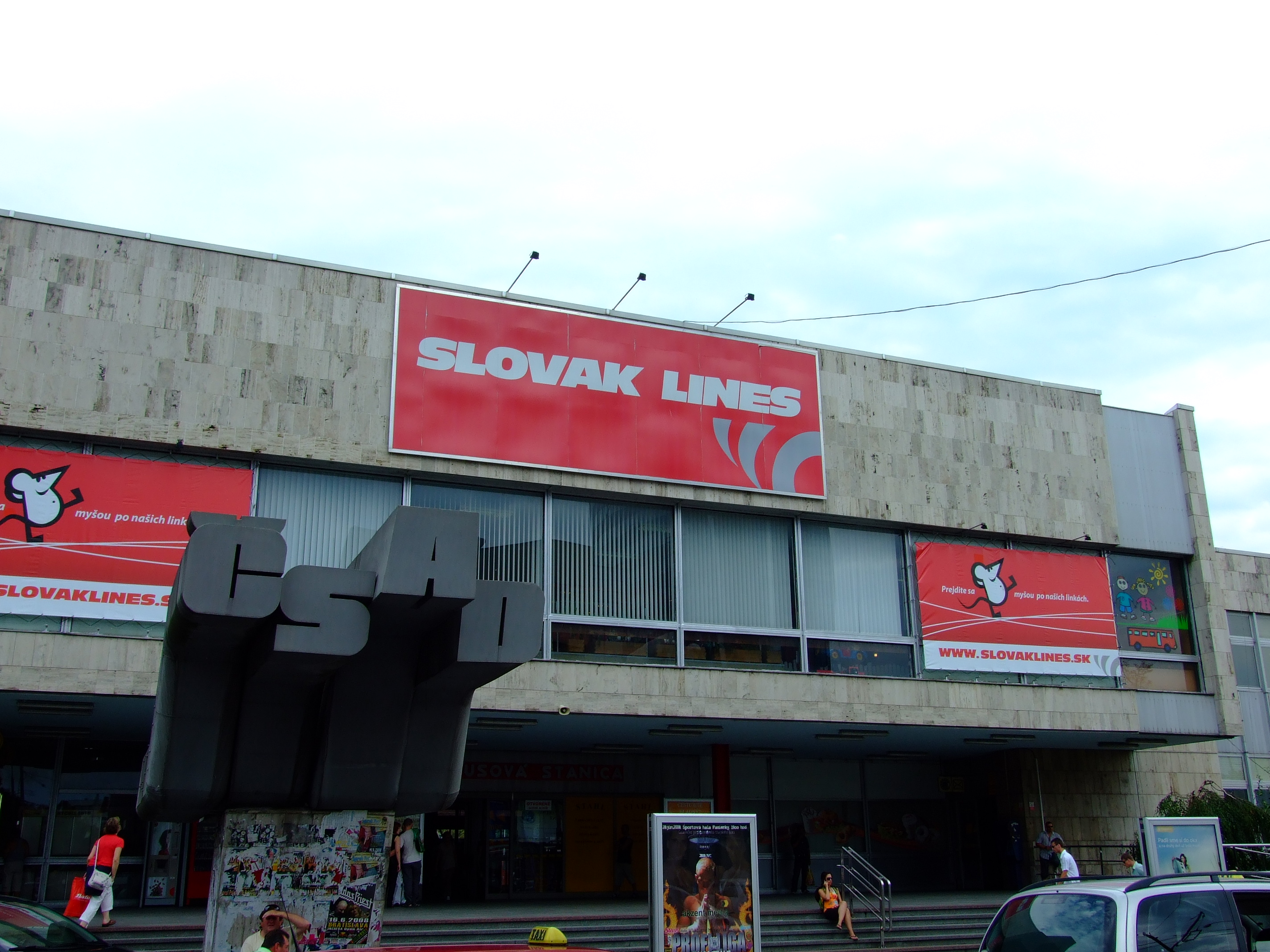
Bratislava Central Bus Station

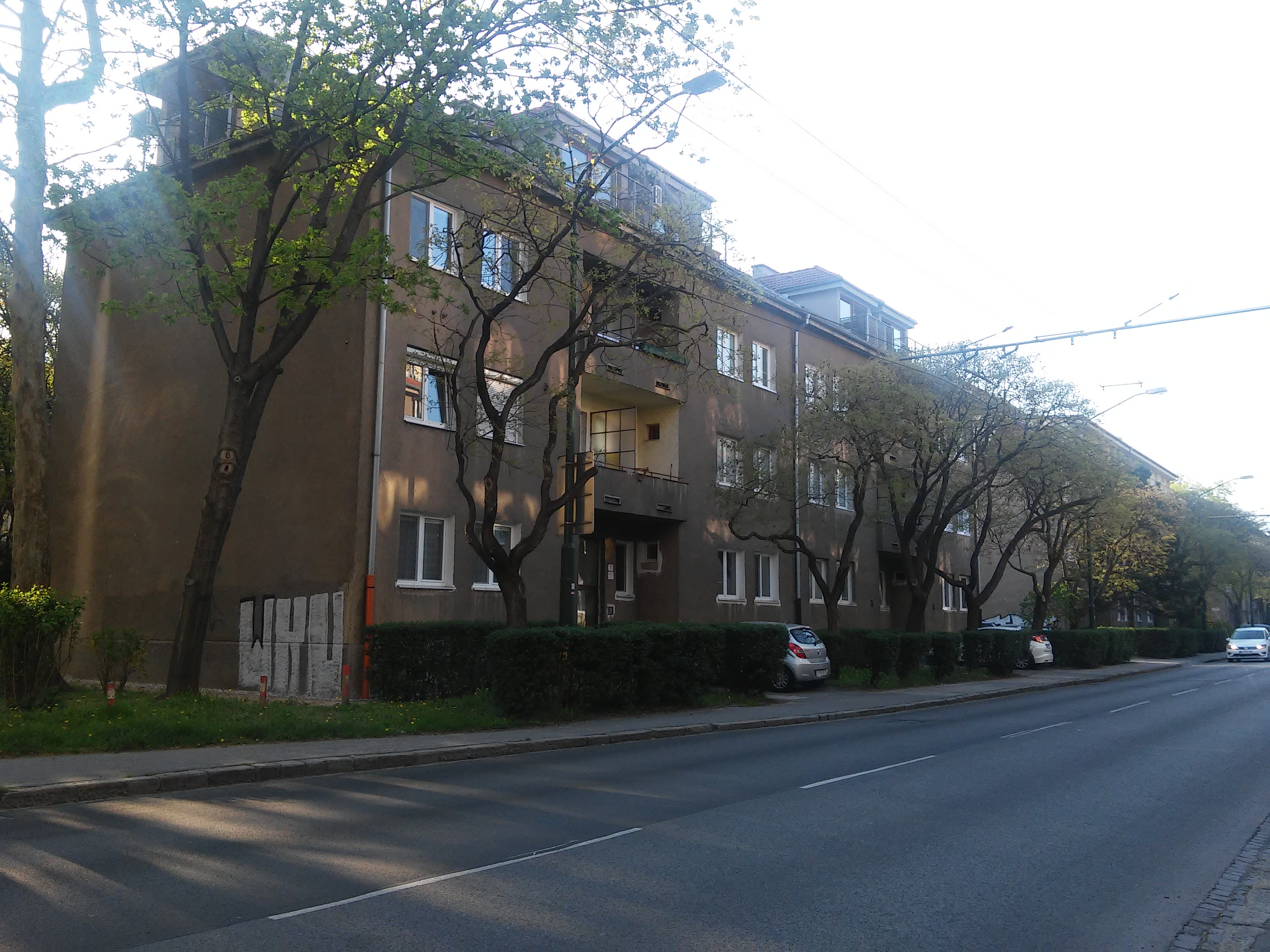
500 apartments development from the 1940s and 1950s

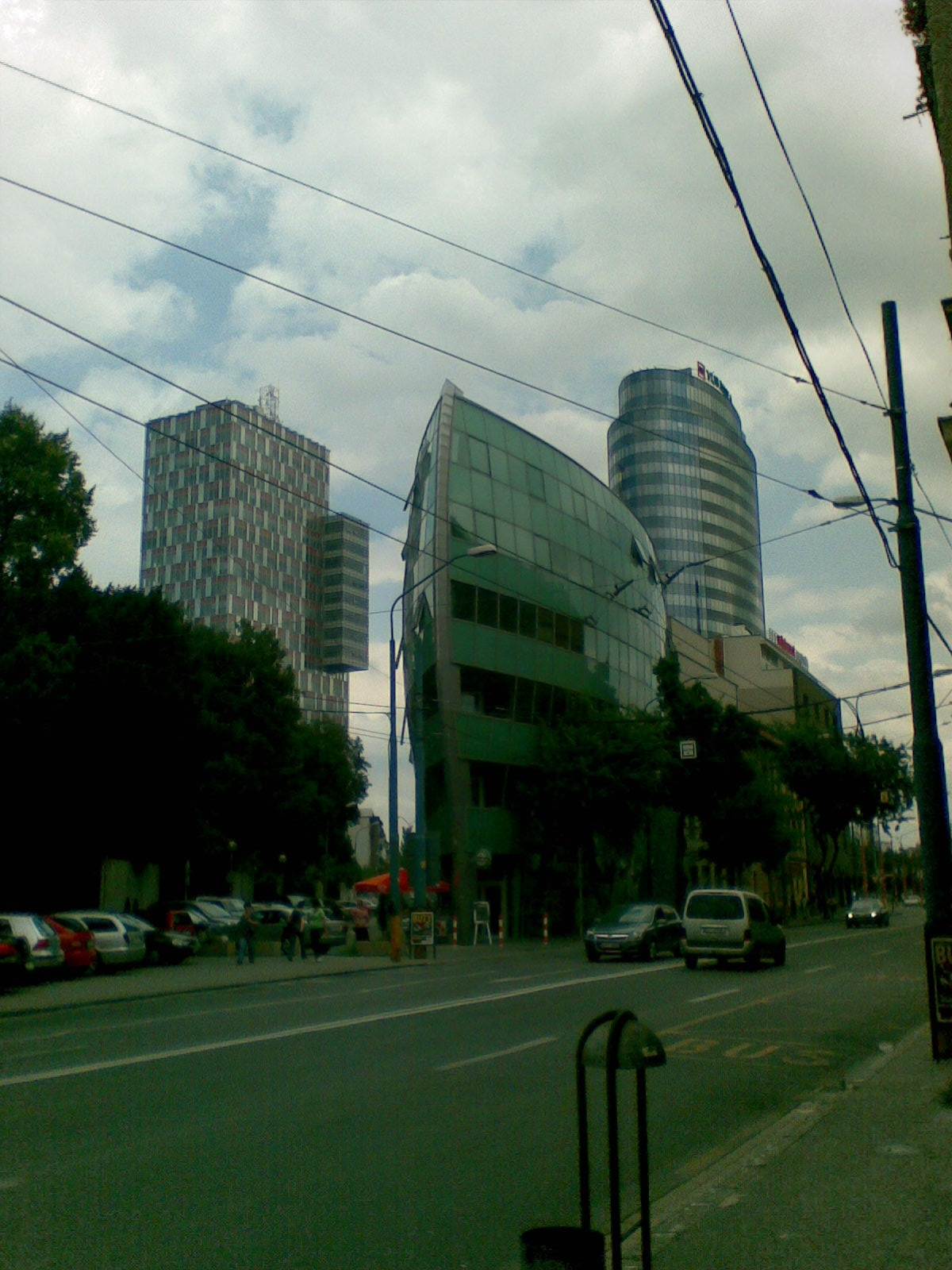
Modern office buildings in the Nivy neighborhood

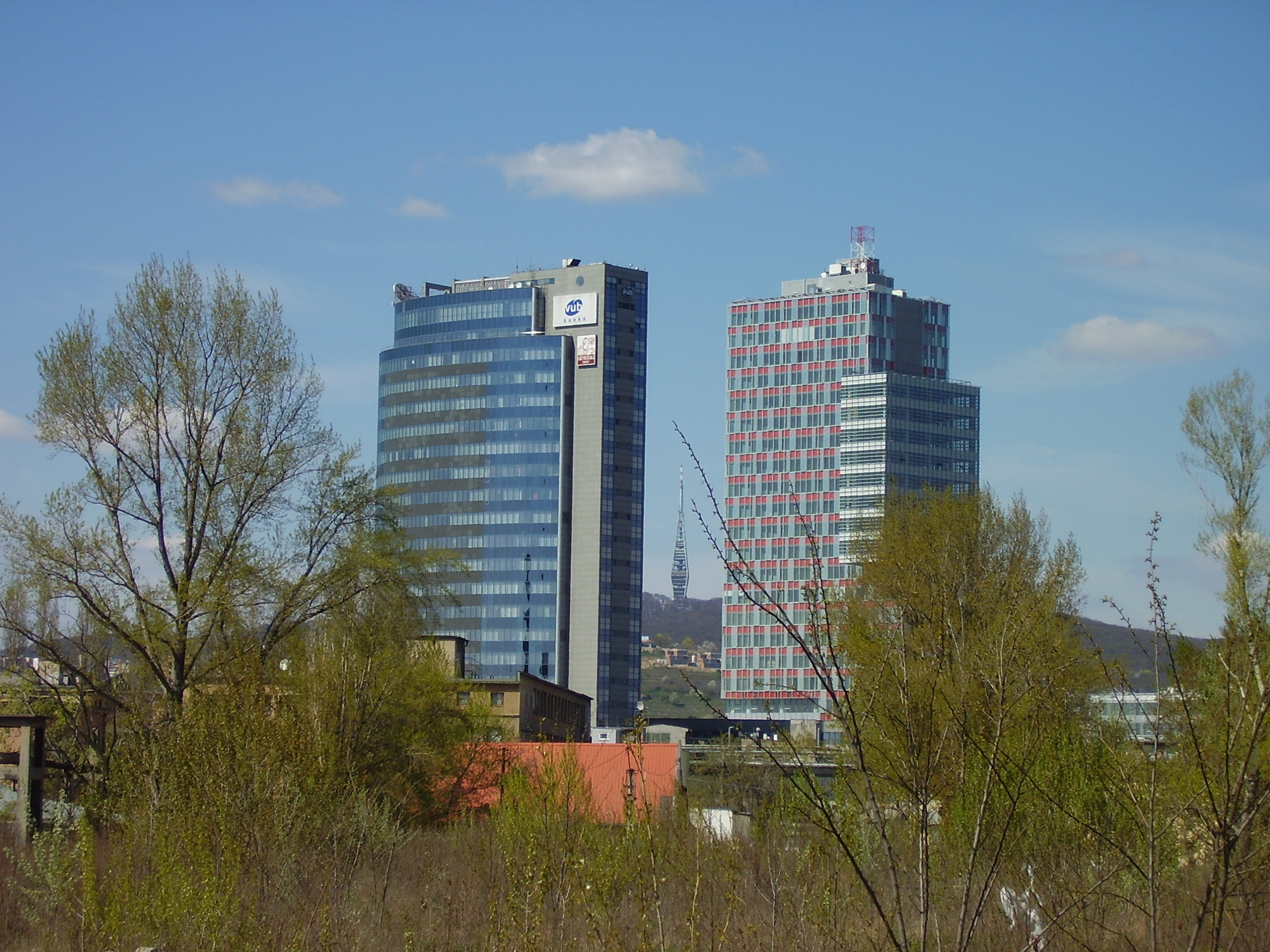
Chalupkova Zone before construction as seen in 2007

== See also ==
- Boroughs and localities of Bratislava
- Economy of Bratislava
