= Transport in Bratislava =

Bratislava's geographical position in Central Europe has long made Bratislava a natural crossroads for international trade traffic. Various ancient trade routes, such as the Amber Road and the Danube waterway have crossed the territory of today's Bratislava. Today Bratislava is a road, railway, waterway and airway hub.

== Road ==
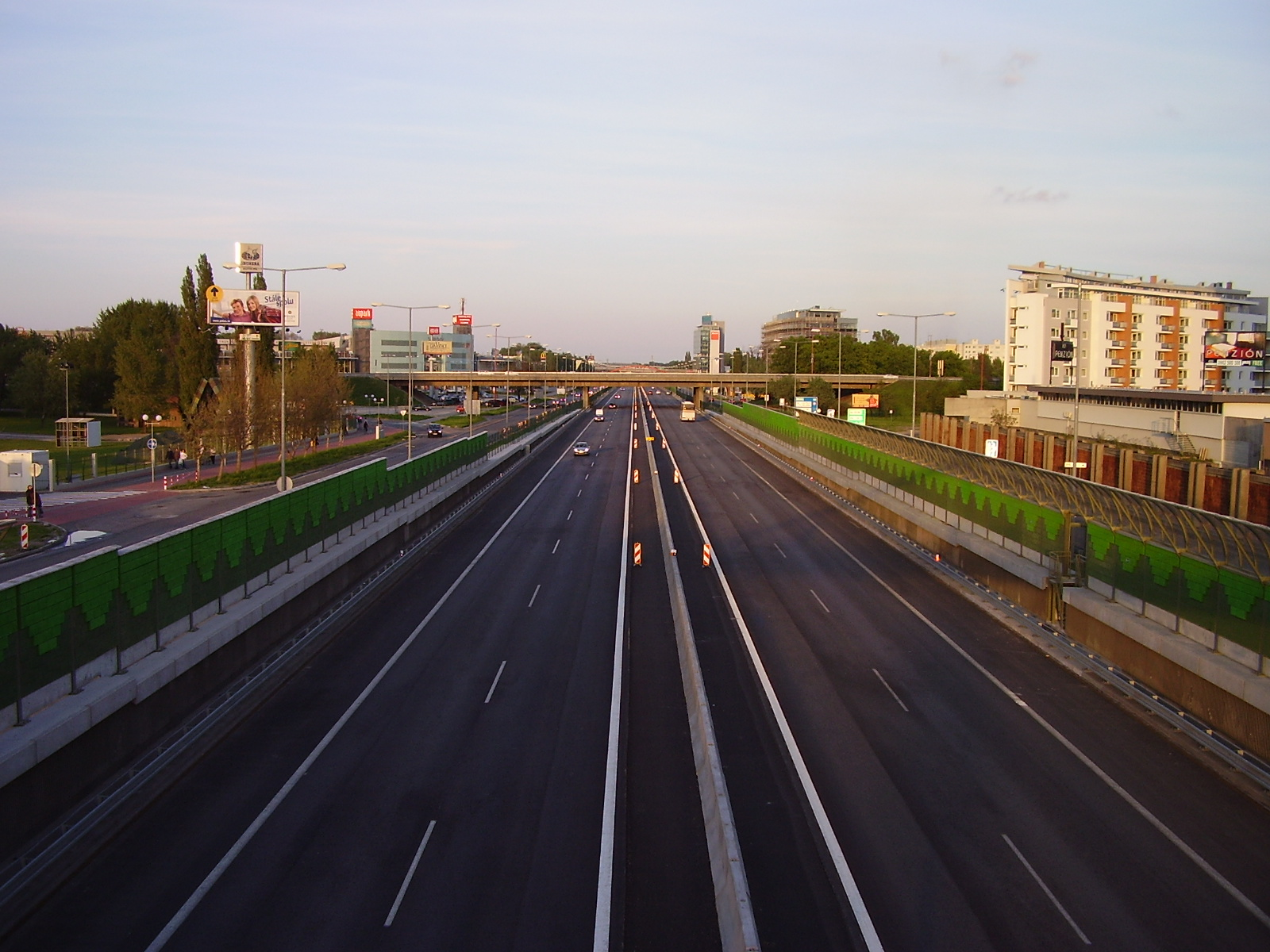
D1 Motorway in Bratislava

The city is a large international motorway junction: The D1 motorway connects Bratislava to Trnava, Nitra, Trenčín, Žilina and beyond, while the D2 motorway, going in the north–south direction, connects it to Prague, Brno and Budapest in the north–south direction. The D4 motorway (an outer bypass), which would ease the pressure on the city highway system, is to be partly finished by 2020 (the southern section with new bridge over Danube river together with R7 expressway and without the planned 10 km tunnel under Small Carpathians).

The A6 motorway to Vienna connects Slovakia directly to the Austrian motorway system and was opened on November 19, 2007.

Currently, five bridges stand over the Danube (ordered by the flow of the river): Lanfranconi Bridge, Nový Most, Starý most, Most Apollo and Prístavný most.

The city's inner network of roadways is made on the radial-circular shape. Nowadays, Bratislava is experiencing a sharp increase in road traffic, increasing pressure on the road network. There are about 200,000 registered cars in Bratislava, which is approximately one car per 2 inhabitants.

Bratislava Central Bus Station (Autobusová stanica Mlynské Nivy or AS Bratislava Nivy) is located in the Nivy neighborhood of the Ružinov borough of Bratislava. It serves as the main hub for both domestic and international intercity bus service for the area of Slovakia. The city features numerous other, much smaller bus stations (usually just bus stops).

== Rail ==
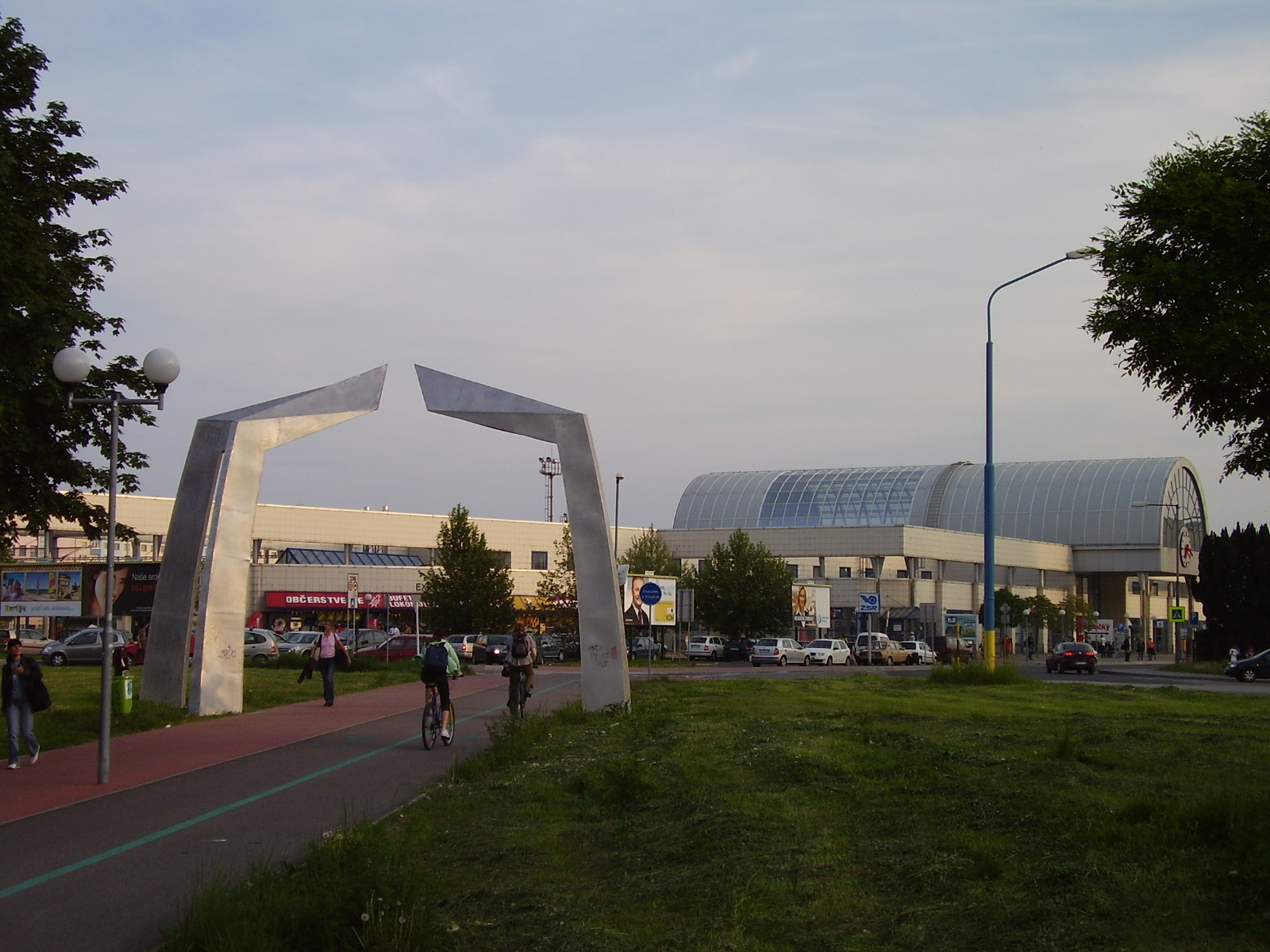
Bratislava-Petržalka Railway Station

The first railway in the Kingdom of Hungary was a horse-drawn railway built in 1840 to Svätý Jur. In 1846, it was extended io Trnava and Sereď. The track was upgraded for steam trains in the 1870s. Steam traction was introduced in 1848, with a link to Vienna and in 1850 with a link to Budapest.

Today, Bratislava is a railway hub, with 7 railway directions (to Marchegg, Břeclav, Trnava, Galanta, Komárno, Hegyeshalom and Parndorf) coming to the city.

The Main railway station lies at the edge of Old Town, with lines connecting it to the Czech Republic, Austria, Hungary, Germany and rest of Slovakia; with direct services to Poland, Belarus, Russia, Croatia (Zagreb), Serbia (Belgrade) and Ukraine.

Another important railway station is the Petržalka railway station, connecting Bratislava with Austria. There are also many suburban stations: Devínske Jazero, Devínska Nová Ves, Lamač, Železná studienka, Vinohrady, Rača, Východ, Vajnory, Rusovce, Nové Mesto, Podunajské Biskupice, Vrakuňa, ÚNS and cancelled stations Devínska Nová Ves zastávka, Nivy, Kopčany, Jarovce, Čunovo and Petržalka-Most.

== Air ==
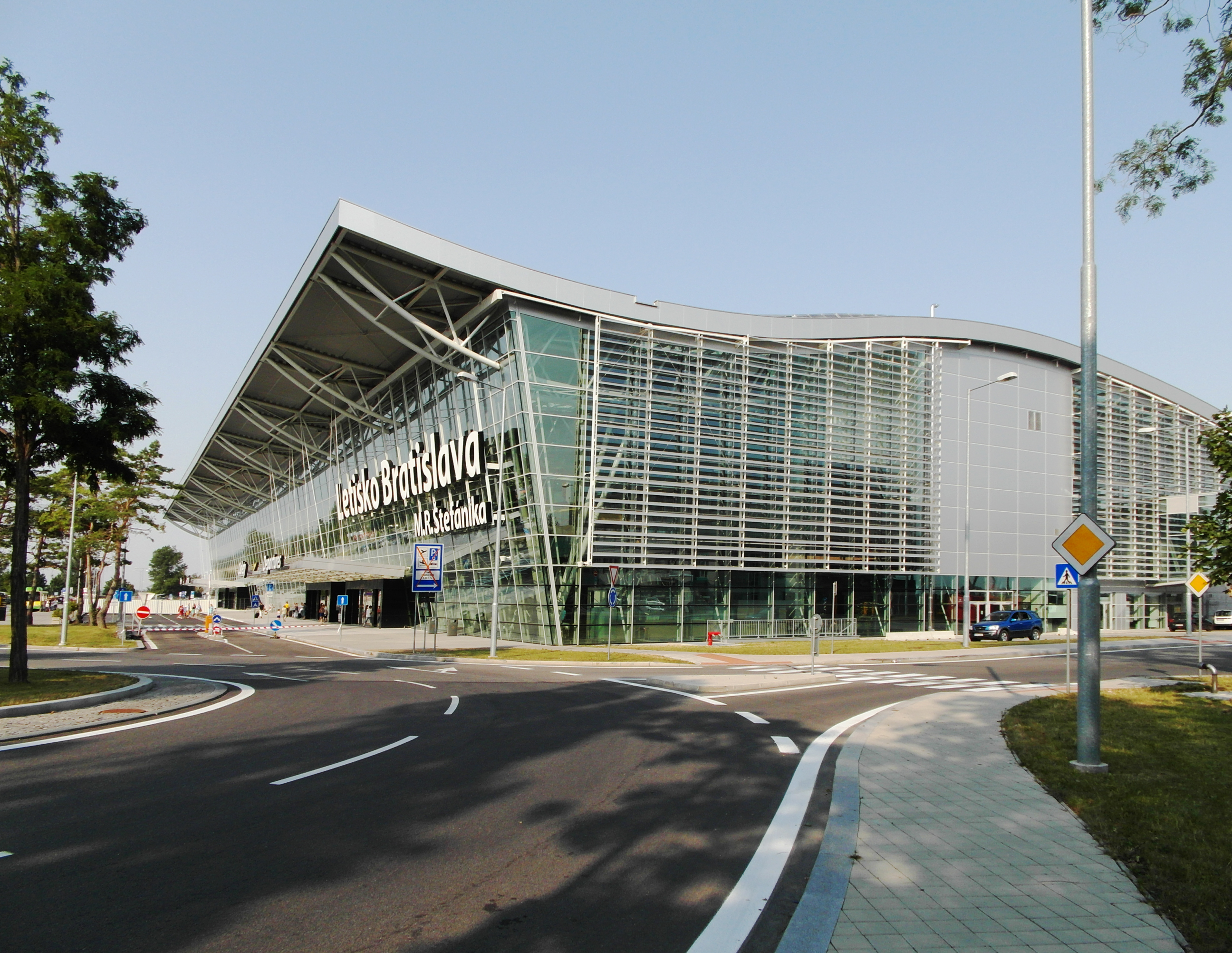
Bratislava Airport

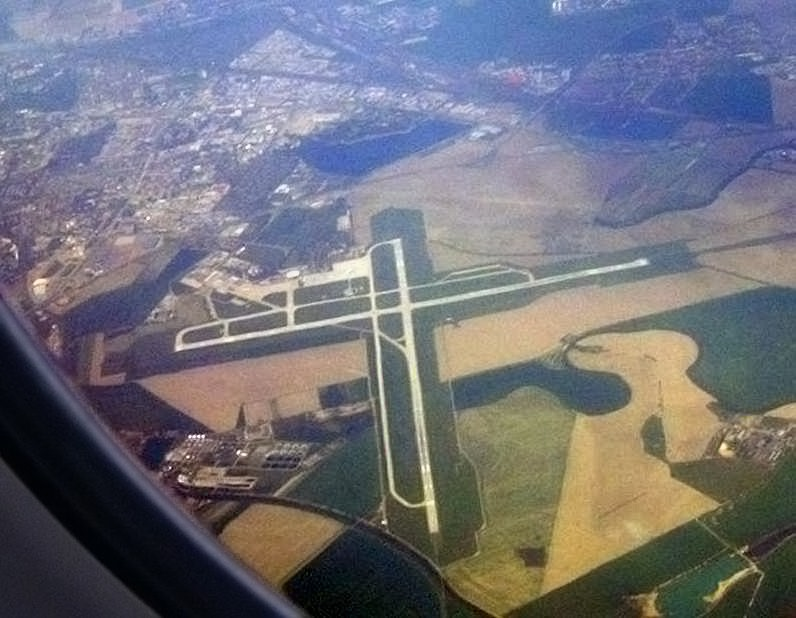
Bratislava Airport from the air

Bratislava's M. R. Štefánik Airport, named after General Milan Rastislav Štefánik and also called Bratislava Airport (Letisko Bratislava), is the main international airport in Slovakia. It is located 9 kilometres (5.59 mi) north-east of the city centre. It serves civil and governmental, scheduled and unscheduled domestic and international flights. The current runways support the landing of all common types of aircraft currently used. The airport has enjoyed rapidly growing passenger traffic in recent years; it served 279,028 passengers in 2000, 1,937,642 in 2006 and 2,024,142 in 2007. Bratislava is also served by the Vienna International Airport located 49 kilometres (30.4 mi) west of the city centre.

Until January 2007, Bratislava was also served by the small Vajnory Airport, which was gradually demolished.

Bratislava features the following heliports:

Image	Location	Ownership	Notes
	Kramáre Hospital – Nemocnica s poliklinikou L. Dérera Kramáre, on the ground behind the hospital	Kramáre Hospital	During communism, this was the only heliport in Bratislava. Helicopters also routinely land on the hospital's roof, which is technically not a heliport.
	National Bank of Slovakia, roof	unknown	Opened on May 23, 2002, it is located on Mýtna Street, next to the Slovak Radio building. The heliport was built only for single-engine helicopters which are prohibited from flying over Bratislava, making the heliport unusable.
	Grand Hotel River Park, Bratislava, River park, roof	BHP	Built in 2010, it is located in the River Park development by the Danube. It is the only private heliport in use in Slovakia, the other 8 are used exclusively by the air rescue service.
	Hotel DoubleTree by Hilton, roof	Tehelné pole, s.r.o.	Opened in April 2011, it is located on Trnavská street, next to the new Ondrej Nepela Arena. The heliport was built but it is not permitted due to noise levels and officially it is not functional.
	Ružinov Hospital, Bratislava, Ružinov	Ružinov Hospital	Built in February, 2022, it is located behind the hospital. Before its construction, a meadow in front of the hospital was routinely used for landing air rescue helicopters, despite the lack of any kind of description.

Helicopters are allowed to land on any land or roof in Bratislava, as long as the pilot considers such place to be safe, and as long as the place either belongs to the pilot, or he has to have the owner's permission.

The airspace over Bratislava is divided into two parts: the approximately 20 kilometers radius around the M. R. Štefánik Airport, where pilots are required to report to air traffic controllers and the rest of the city, where just a flying permit (Slovak: letové povolenie) is sufficient. It is prohibited to fly over Bratislava in the night, yet flights do occur and go unpunished.

== River ==
The Port of Bratislava is one of the two international river ports in Slovakia. The port connects Bratislava to international boat traffic, especially the interconnection from the North Sea to the Black Sea via the Rhine-Main-Danube Canal. Additionally, tourist lines operate from Bratislava's passenger port, including routes to Devín, Vienna and elsewhere.

== Public transport ==
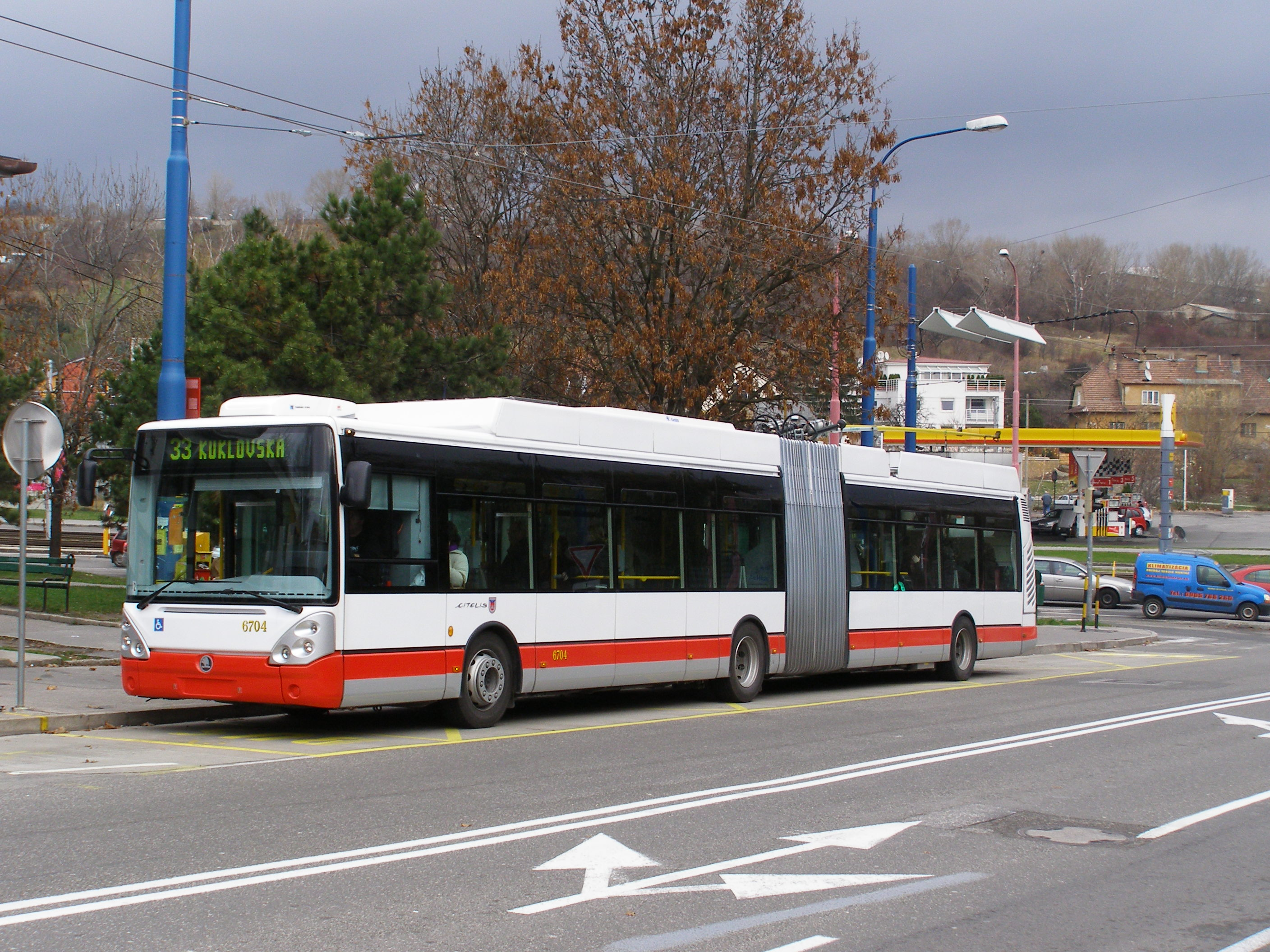
Duobus (a trolleybus combined with a bus) on line 33 at Riviéra (old name: Molecova) (Slovak: Riviéra (old name: Molecova) bus stop

Public transportation in Bratislava is managed by Dopravný podnik Bratislava, a city-owned company. The transport system is known as Mestská hromadná doprava (MHD, Municipal Mass Transit). The history of public transportation in Bratislava began in 1895, with the opening of the first tram route.

The system uses three main types of vehicles. Buses cover almost the entire city and go to the most remote boroughs and areas, with 60 daily routes, 20 night routes and other routes on certain occasions. Trams (streetcars) cover 13 heavily used commuter routes. Trolleybuses serve as a complementary means of transport, with 13 routes. An additional service, Bratislava Integrated Transport (Bratislavská integrovaná doprava), links train and bus routes in the city with points beyond.

Major transport junctions include Trnavské mýto, Račianske mýto, Patrónka, Bratislava main railway station and Most SNP (Nový most).
