= Central Baths, Bratislava =

Coordinates: 48°9′25″N 17°7′46″E

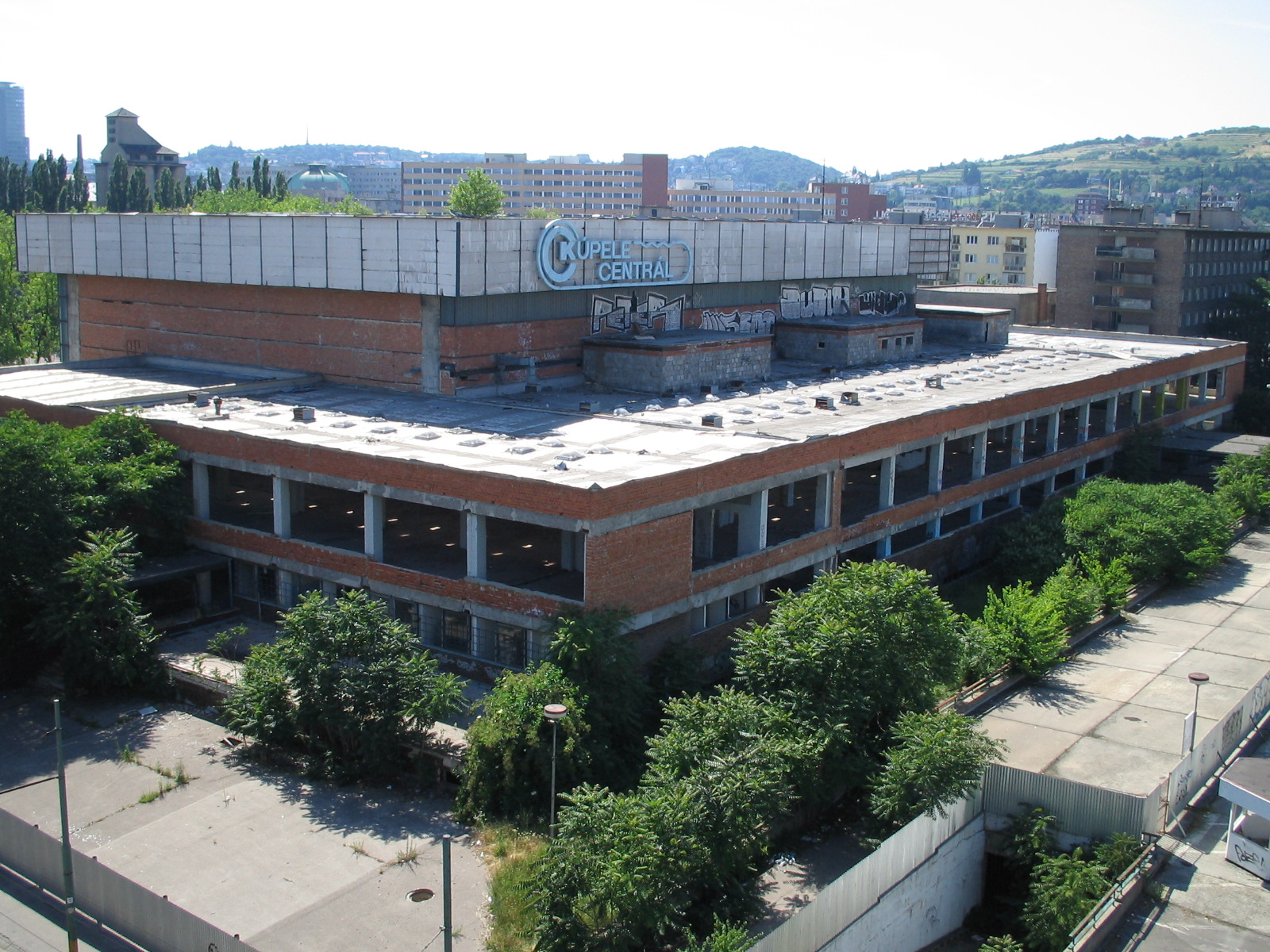
Building of Central Baths in 2005

Kupele Central (Central Baths) were public baths in the center of Bratislava, Slovakia. Construction began in the 1970s, but a decade of construction delays ensued. The facility would open in 1987 with an Olympic sized swimming pool and steam baths, and subsequently close in 1992. Soon after their opening operations became too expensive due to ongoing technical problems. Despite visions to reopen the facility, it would remain closed for use until its demolition in 2008.

After abandonment but before its demolition, Kupele Central became a hotspot for illegal use by various subcultures, particularly graffiti writers and other street artists.

In 2008 the building was completely demolished and a construction of a new 100 million Euro office, residential and shopping complex named Central began. Construction was completed in spring 2012.
