= Public toilets in Bratislava =

Public toilets (or public WC) (Slovak: verejné WC) in Bratislava, Slovakia are managed by the local government, which pays for the water. Bratislava is known for having a very limited number of public restrooms and their appearance has changed little since the fall of the Soviet Union. Unlike restrooms in other spaces such as stores and restaurants, traditional public toilets are staffed with a washroom attendant and generally require payment for use.

As of 2011, urinating or defecating in public in Slovakia is punishable by a fine of €33. The mistrust of public toilets, including at night when they are lit, is such that many prefer the toilets in fast food restaurants. Many restaurants and pubs lock their toilets and issue keys only upon demand by their customers. In spite of queues, there were no plans to build additional public restrooms in Bratislava as of 2006. This has been to the detriment of the city's tourism industry, and reports from city guides and travel agencies cite the lack of public toilets as one of Bratislava's hurdles in tourism development.

== History ==
The tradition of Bratislava's public toilets emerged in the Soviet era and has continued into the 21st century. Public toilets were separated by sex, entrances being guarded by notoriously ill-tempered restroom ladies (Slovak: hajzelbaba). The client would disclose whether they needed to urinate or defecate, and would be charged accordingly, with the latter costing more. Finally, the client was issued their share of toilet paper, sometimes with an embarrassing negotiation regarding the need for more.

The following public toilets have been closed in Bratislava: Suché mýto, Hurbanovo Námestie and metal toilets on Vajanského Nábrežie. In 2011, the Borough of Old Town decided to close half of its public toilets, claiming to use the money saved in this way for maintaining green areas and cleaning. Referring to a survey done during the week of 22 February to 27 February 2011, Tomáš Halán, spokesperson for the Borough of Old Town, stated that there was a case in the survey in which each visitor cost the municipality 22 euros.

== Partial list of public toilets in Bratislava ==
The following is a partial list of public toilets in Bratislava.

| Image | Location | Open? | Ownership | Notes |
|---|---|---|---|---|
| | Šafárikovo Námestie (Old Town) | Open | The borough of Old Town | According to some sources it was supposed to stop operating on 1 April 2011. Open daily 8:00–19:00. |
| | Námestie Eugena Suchoňa / Palackého Street (Old Town), in front of Reduta | Open | The borough of Old Town | The most visited public toilets in Old Town, reconstructed in 2014, entry fee is €.50. Open daily 8:00–19:00. |
| | Kapucínska Street / Staromestská Street (Old Town) | Closed | The borough of Old Town | Closed since 1 April 2011: "satellite view of WC near Kapucínska Street" (Map). Google Maps. |
| | Kamenné Námestie / Námestie SNP (Old Town) | Closed | The borough of Old Town | Slovak media refer to these public restrooms as being on Námestie SNP. Closed for years because of groundwater leakage. |
| | Kollárovo Námestie (Old Town) | Closed | The borough of Old Town | Opening hours were 8:00–19:00, closed since 1 April 2011. |
| | 29. Augusta Street (Old Town) | Closed | The borough of Old Town | Opening hours were 8:00–19:00, closed since 1 April 2011. |
| | Americké Námestie (American Square) (Old Town) | Closed | The borough of Old Town | Opening hours were 8:00–19:00, closed since 1 March 2011. Converted into a pub around 2013. |
| | Medic Garden (Old Town) | Open | The borough of Old Town | Partially reconstructed in 2007, later vandalised. Open daily 8:00–19:00. |
| | Uršulínska Street, building of the Bratislava City Magistrate (Old Town) | Open | Bratislava city Magistrate | Built in 2008, allows access for the handicapped. The building is on Primate's Square. Open daily 9:00–21:00. |
| | Pedestrian underpass Trnavské mýto | Closed | Bratislava city Magistrate | Partially devastated. |
| | Pedestrian underpass Hodžovo námestie (Old Town) | Open | Bratislava city Magistrate | Reconstructed in 2008, allows access for the handicapped. Open Mon-Fri 8:00–18:00, Sat 8:00–12:00. |
| | Nová Tržnica building on Trnavské mýto (New Town) | Open | The borough of New Town | Four public toilets, open Mon-Fri 6:00–18:00 Sat 06:00–14:00. |
| | Karloveská Street (Karlova Ves) | Closed | The borough of Karlova Ves | Devastated, closed for some 15 years. |
| | Bus station underneath the Nový Most bridge | Open | | Open daily 06:00–23:00. |
| | Near River Park at the Danube riverbank | Open | | Open daily 10:00–18:00 in the winter and 10:00–20:00 in the summer, entry fee is €.50. |

=== Public toilets in mass transport systems in Bratislava ===
- Bratislava-Petržalka railway station
- Bratislava main railway station
- Železnicná stanica Vinohrady
- Železnicná stanica Nove Mesto
- Main bus station Mlynske Nivy
- M. R. Štefánik Airport
