= Bratislava 2 =

Coordinates: 48.151917°N 17.209533°E

Bratislava II District
- District
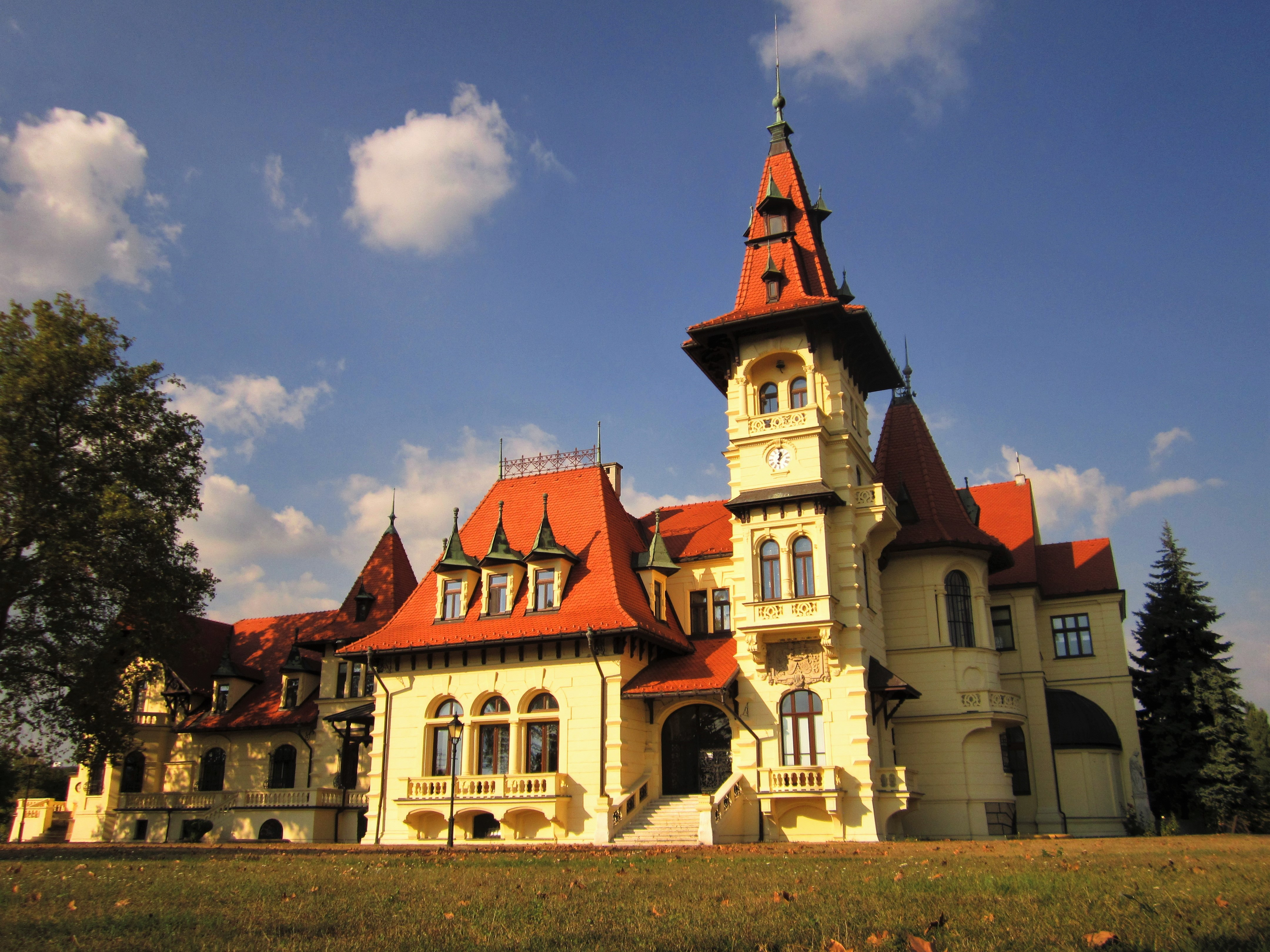
- Country: Slovakia
- Region (kraj): Bratislava Region
- Seat: Bratislava

Area
  - Total: 92.49 km^{2} (35.71 sq mi)

Population (2025)
  - Total: 127,409
- Time zone: UTC+1 (CET)
  - Summer (DST): UTC+2 (CEST)
- Telephone prefix: 02
- Vehicle registration plate (until 2022): BA, BL, BT, BD, BE, BI
- Boroughs: 3

Bratislava II (Slovak: okres Bratislava II; Hungarian: Pozsonyi II. járás) is a district (okres) of Bratislava in the Bratislava Region of Slovakia. It covers the south-eastern part of Bratislava, including the boroughs of Ružinov, Podunajské Biskupice and Vrakuňa. It is bordered by the Bratislava I, Bratislava III, Bratislava V and Senec districts.

== Population ==
Historical population
| Year | Pop. | ±% |
|---|---|---|
| 1970 | 107,246 | — |
| 1980 | 119,845 | +11.7% |
| 1991 | 112,419 | −6.2% |
| 2001 | 108,139 | −3.8% |
| 2011 | 108,362 | +0.2% |
| 2021 | 125,179 | +15.5% |
Source: Censuses

Population statistic (10 years)
| Year | 1995 | 2005 | 2015 | 2025 |
|---|---|---|---|---|
| Count | 113,093 | 108,647 | 113,201 | 127,409 |
| Difference | | −3.93% | +4.19% | +12.55% |

Population statistic
| Year | 2024 | 2025 |
|---|---|---|
| Count | 126,649 | 127,409 |
| Difference | | +0.60% |

It has a population of 127,409 people (31 December 2025).

=== Ethnicity ===
Census 2021 (1+ %)
| Ethnicity | Number | Fraction |
|---|---|---|
| Slovak | 106,324 | 81.52% |
| Not found out | 11,949 | 9.16% |
| Hungarian | 5228 | 4% |
| Czech | 1814 | 1.39% |
| Total | 130,423 | |

In year 2021 was 130,423 people by ethnicity 106,324 as Slovak, 11,949 as Not found out, 5228 as Hungarian, 1814 as Czech, 1083 as Other, 577 as Rusyn, 461 as German, 392 as Ukrainian, 358 as Russian, 239 as Romani, 226 as Chinese, 210 as Vietnamese, 175 as Bulgarian, 168 as Italian, 168 as Polish, 143 as Serbian, 120 as Moravian, 117 as Jewish, 113 as Croatian, 95 as French, 93 as Austrian, 91 as Romanian, 87 as Albanian, 64 as Greek, 25 as Turkish, 23 as Irish, 23 as Canadian, 23 as English, 15 as Iranian, 13 as Korean and 6 as Silesian.

Note on population: The difference values of population numbers in the table "Population statistic" and in the sections "Ethnicity" & "Religion" is caused by the use of various statistical methods.

=== Religion ===
Census 2021 (1+ %)
| Religion | Number | Fraction |
|---|---|---|
| None | 53,323 | 42.6% |
| Roman Catholic Church | 48,054 | 38.39% |
| Not found out | 11,979 | 9.57% |
| Evangelical Church | 5000 | 3.99% |
| Greek Catholic Church | 1510 | 1.21% |
| Total | 125,179 | |

In year 2021 was 125,179 people by religion 53,323 from None, 48,054 from Roman Catholic Church, 11,979 from Not found out, 5000 from Evangelical Church, 1510 from Greek Catholic Church, 746 from Eastern Orthodox Church, 648 from Ad hoc movements, 627 from Other, 433 from Calvinist Church, 393 from Christian Congregations in Slovakia, 368 from Other and not ascertained christian church, 360 from Jehovah's Witnesses, 322 from Buddhism, 258 from Islam, 240 from Baptists Church, 185 from Church of the Brethren, 167 from Jewish community, 166 from Apostolic Church, 102 from Paganism and natural spirituality, 74 from United Methodist Church, 64 from Old Catholic Church, 55 from Hinduism, 54 from Seventh-day Adventist Church, 25 from Czechoslovak Hussite Church, 15 from Church of Jesus Christ of Latter-day Saints and 11 from Bahá'i Community.

== Boroughs ==
| Borough | Area [km^{2}] | Population |
|---|---|---|
| Podunajské Biskupice | 42.49 | 22,998 |
| Ružinov | 39.70 | 84,233 |
| Vrakuňa | 10.29 | 20,178 |

Population and area values are current for year 2025.
