= Ružinov =

Ružinov Ruzsinó/Főrév
- Borough
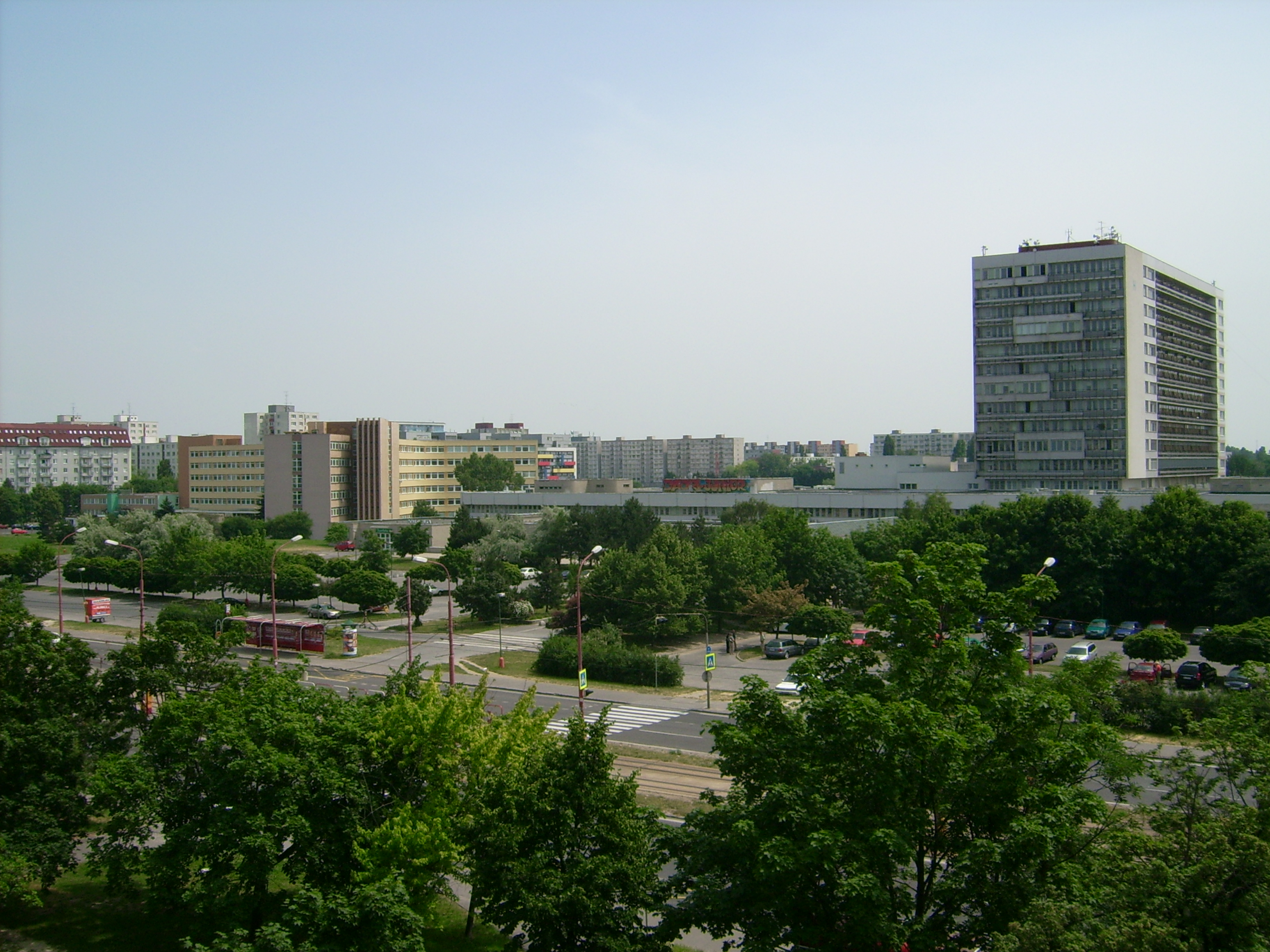

- Coat of arms

- Area of Ružinov in Bratislava

- Location of Ružinov in Slovakia
- Coordinates: 48°08′00″N 17°07′00″E
- Country: Slovakia
- Region: Bratislava Region
- District: Bratislava II

Government
  - Mayor: Martin Chren

Area
  - Total: 39.70 km^{2} (15.33 sq mi)
- Elevation: 134 m (440 ft)

Population (2025)
  - Total: 84,233
- Time zone: UTC+1 (CET)
  - Summer (DST): UTC+2 (CEST)
- Postal code: 821 0X
- Area code: +421-2
- Vehicle registration plate (until 2022): BA, BL, BT
- Website: www.ruzinov.sk

Ružinov (Slovak pronunciation: [ˈruʐinɔw], Hungarian: Ruzsinó/Főrév, German: Rosenheim) is a borough of Bratislava, the capital of Slovakia, located in the Bratislava II district. It is the city's second most populated borough, housing over 80,000 inhabitants and its Nivy neighbourhood is the place of the emerging new city center of Bratislava. Ružinov features extensive residential areas, as well as major industrial facilities and transport infrastructure including the Milan Rastislav Štefánik international airport and the D1 motorway.

The borough features the Slovnaft refinery, Avion Shopping Park mall, Ružinov hospital, Štrkovec lake, Zlaté Piesky recreational area and numerous schools and churches.

== Location ==
Ružinov is bordered by the borough of Old Town to the north-west, Nové Mesto to the north, Rača and Vajnory to the north-east, Podunajské Biskupice to the south and Petržalka to the west across the river Danube connected by the Prístavný most.

The municipality lies at an altitude of 134 metres (440 ft) and covers an area of 39.70 km^{2} (15.33 sq mi) (2025).

=== Division ===
Neighborhoods of Ružinov

Ružinov is divided into the following neighborhoods:

- Vlčie hrdlo
- Nivy
- Prievoz
- Trávniky
- Štrkovec
- Pošeň
- Ostredky
- Trnávka

Ružinov is cadastrially divided into three parts: Ružinov, Nivy and Trnávka.

== History ==
In place of today's Ružinov there were originally meadows, pastures, grasslands and woodland, interspersed with islands and channels of the Danube. The people living here worked in agriculture, ranching and logging. In the 19th century, the agricultural character of the area was slowly disappearing, as many new factories were built in the area. The current name was only coined in the 20th century, and is based on the term Ružový ostrov, which translates as the Rose Island (German: Rosenheim).

== Characteristics ==
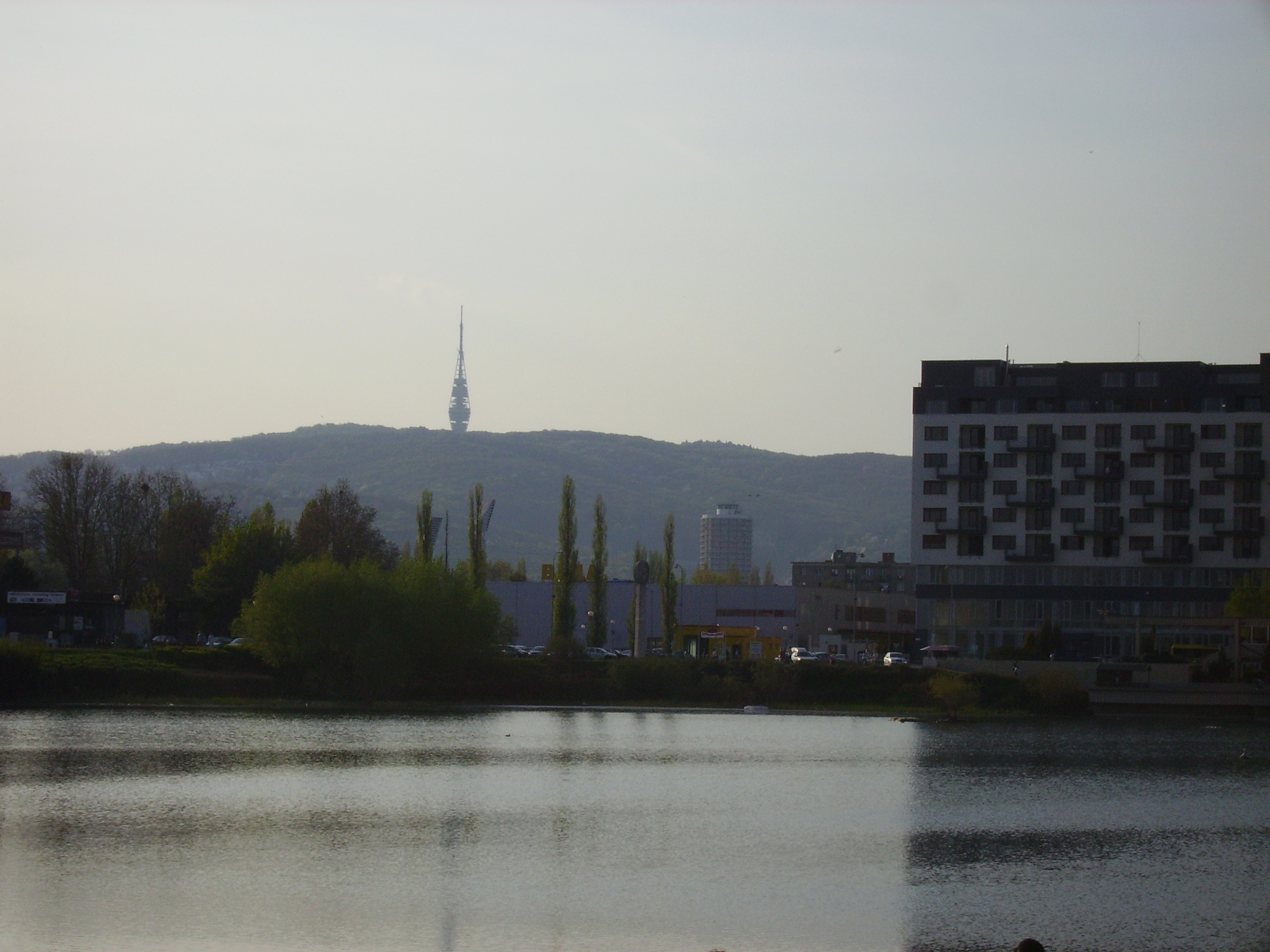
Štrkovec lake in Ružinov

Today, Ružinov is a location for many industrial businesses, shopping centres, financial businesses and banks. Industrial plants such as Slovnaft and Gumon, and the cargo Port of Bratislava, are located here. Apart from the chemical industry it is home to food and construction industries. The Miletičova Open-air Market, Bratislava's largest and most frequented, is also located in Ružinov. The Milan Rastislav Štefánik international airport is also located here. Avion Shopping Park, the largest shopping center in Slovakia, is based in Ružinov, with the Ikea store and surrounded by new office buildings and two hotels (Hotel Gate One Bratislava and Chopin Airport Hotel).

Despite its industrial character, Ružinov is considered to be a relatively green part of Bratislava. In contrast to other city districts, it is rich in streams and lakes (such as Rohlík lake), with a total water area of 616,000 m^{2}. At the heart of Ružinov there is the Štrkovec Lake area, a major recreational and sporting centre for Bratislava. Other lakes include Zlaté Piesky, a major summer resort, and Rohlík.

== Population ==
Population statistic (10 years)
| Year | 1995 | 2005 | 2015 | 2025 |
|---|---|---|---|---|
| Count | 73,971 | 69,674 | 71,443 | 84,233 |
| Difference | | −5.80% | +2.53% | +17.90% |

Population statistic
| Year | 2024 | 2025 |
|---|---|---|
| Count | 83,401 | 84,233 |
| Difference | | +0.99% |

It has a population of 84,233 people (31 December 2025).

=== Ethnicity ===
Census 2021 (1+ %)
| Ethnicity | Number | Fraction |
|---|---|---|
| Slovak | 69,691 | 86.03% |
| Not found out | 7572 | 9.34% |
| Hungarian | 2213 | 2.73% |
| Czech | 1258 | 1.55% |
| Other | 862 | 1.06% |
| Total | 81,004 | |

In year 2021 was 81,004 people by ethnicity 69,691 as Slovak, 7572 as Not found out, 2213 as Hungarian, 1258 as Czech, 862 as Other, 426 as Rusyn, 340 as German, 273 as Russian, 252 as Ukrainian, 169 as Vietnamese, 156 as Chinese, 141 as Italian, 121 as Bulgarian, 102 as Polish, 94 as Jewish, 92 as Romani, 92 as Moravian, 81 as French, 78 as Croatian, 74 as Serbian, 65 as Albanian, 64 as Austrian, 57 as Romanian, 57 as Greek, 20 as Turkish, 17 as Irish, 17 as Canadian, 14 as English, 13 as Korean, 9 as Iranian and 4 as Silesian.

Note on population: The difference values of population numbers in the table "Population statistic" and in the sections "Ethnicity" & "Religion" is caused by the use of various statistical methods.

=== Religion ===
Census 2021 (1+ %)
| Religion | Number | Fraction |
|---|---|---|
| None | 35,070 | 43.29% |
| Roman Catholic Church | 30,220 | 37.31% |
| Not found out | 7595 | 9.38% |
| Evangelical Church | 3570 | 4.41% |
| Greek Catholic Church | 1044 | 1.29% |
| Total | 81,004 | |

In year 2021 was 81,004 people by religion 35,070 from None, 30,220 from Roman Catholic Church, 7595 from Not found out, 3570 from Evangelical Church, 1044 from Greek Catholic Church, 487 from Eastern Orthodox Church, 434 from Other, 404 from Ad hoc movements, 261 from Other and not ascertained christian church, 260 from Calvinist Church, 224 from Buddhism, 222 from Jehovah's Witnesses, 206 from Christian Congregations in Slovakia, 182 from Islam, 162 from Church of the Brethren, 142 from Jewish community, 134 from Baptists Church, 111 from Apostolic Church, 66 from Paganism and natural spirituality, 48 from Seventh-day Adventist Church, 46 from United Methodist Church, 40 from Hinduism, 34 from Old Catholic Church, 23 from Czechoslovak Hussite Church, 11 from Bahá'i Community and 8 from Church of Jesus Christ of Latter-day Saints.

== Politics ==
Ružinov local government was established by the elections in November 1990 and in December 1990, it founded the municipal office of the Ružinov borough. Over time, the number of members of the local parliament was reduced from 60 to 25.

List of mayors of Ružinov and political parties that nominated them:

- 1990 – 1994 – Jozef Olejár (VPN)
- 1994 – 1998 – Richard Volek (ĽS-HZDS, SNS, KSÚ)
- 1998 – 2002 – Pavol Kubovič (SDK)
- 2002 – 2006 – Pavol Kubovič (SDKÚ, KDH, ANO, SMK)
- 2006 – 2010 – Slavomír Drozd (Smer-SD, SMK, ĽS-HZDS, SF)
- 2010 – 2014 - Dušan Pekár (KDH)
- 2014 – 2018 – Dušan Pekár (KDH, OĽaNO, Nova, Zmena zdola, Demokratická únia Slovenska, OKS, SMK-MKP)
- 2018 – 2022 – Martin Chren (New Majority (Slovakia), ran as an independent candidate)

== Media ==
- Ružinovské echo - local monthly magazine, established in 1992
- TV Ružinov - local TV station, established in May 1996 as TV RIK

Both media are published and operated by the municipal company TVR a RE, s.r.o.

== Religion ==
Ružinov belongs into three Roman Catholic parishes (Farnosť Bratislava ‐ Prievoz, Farnosť Bratislava ‐ Márie pomocnice kresťanov, Farnosť Bratislava – Trnávka), one Protestant parish (Evanjelický cirkevný zbor AV Bratislava – Prievoz) and one Eastern Orthodox Church parish (Pravoslávna cirkevná obec Bratislava).

The borough features the following churches:

- Orthodox Church of Saint Rastislav (Chrám svätého Rastislava) on Tomášikova Street, consecrated in May 2013.
- Roman Catholic Church of Virgin Mary Help of Christians (Kostol Márie Pomocnice kresťanov a Dom saleziánov dona Bosca) on Miletičova Street No. 7, consecrated in 1990
- Roman Catholic Church of Saint Don Bosco and Salesian Institute at Dornkappl (Kostol sv. D. Bosca a Saleziánsky ústav na Dornkappli), Okružná Street No. 11, consecrated in 1938
- Protestant Lutheran Church in Prievoz (Kostol Evanjelickej cirkvi a. v. Prievoz), Radničné námestie No. 2, consecrated in 1925
- Roman Catholic Church of Saint Vincent de Paul (Kostol sv. Vincenta de Paul) on Tomášikova street, consecrated in 2000

== Education ==
Ružinov is home to several high schools, 9 elementary schools and 11 kindergartens. It also houses the Pan-European University on Tomášikova Street and the Faculty of Social and Economic Studies of the Comenius University on Mlynské luhy Street.

- Elementary schools: ZŠ Borodáčova Street, ZŠ Drieňová Street, ZŠ Kulíškova Street, ZŠ Medzilaborecká Street, ZŠ Mierová Street, ZŠ Nevädzová Street, ZŠ Ostredková Street, ZŠ Ružová dolina Street, ZŠ Vrútocká Street
- There is also the United Church School of Saint Vincent de Paul which combines an elementary school and high school
- Public kindergartens and their allocated classes: MŠ Bancíkovej Street 2, MŠ Exnárova Street 6, MŠ Miletičova Street 37 (including MŠ Gemerská Street 4), MŠ Medzilaborecká Street 4 (including Haburská Street 4), MŠ Piesočná Street 2 (including MŠ Rádiová 52 and MŠ Vietnamská 13), MŠ Západná Street 2), MŠ Prešovská Street 28 (including MŠ Palkovičova Street 11/A), MŠ Pivonková Street 9 (including MŠ Astrová Street 5, MŠ Nevädzová Street 12 and MŠ Šalviová Street 5), MŠ Habarka, Stálicova Street 2 (including MŠ Haburská Street 6), MŠ Šťastná Street 26, MŠ Velehradská Street 24 (including MŠ Budovateľská Street 10 and MŠ Tekovská Street 7, 9)

In the school year 2012/2013, 586 children were accepted into the seven Ružinov kindergartens, 229 children were rejected due to lack of space. In the school year 2016/2017, 658 children were accepted into the eleven Ružinov kindergartens.

== Sports ==
Many sporting clubs are based in Ružinov, including the FK Rapid football club, the Slávia UK volleyball club, the Dunajplavba wrestling club and the street hockey club ŠK H.O.K. Nivy.

== Gallery ==
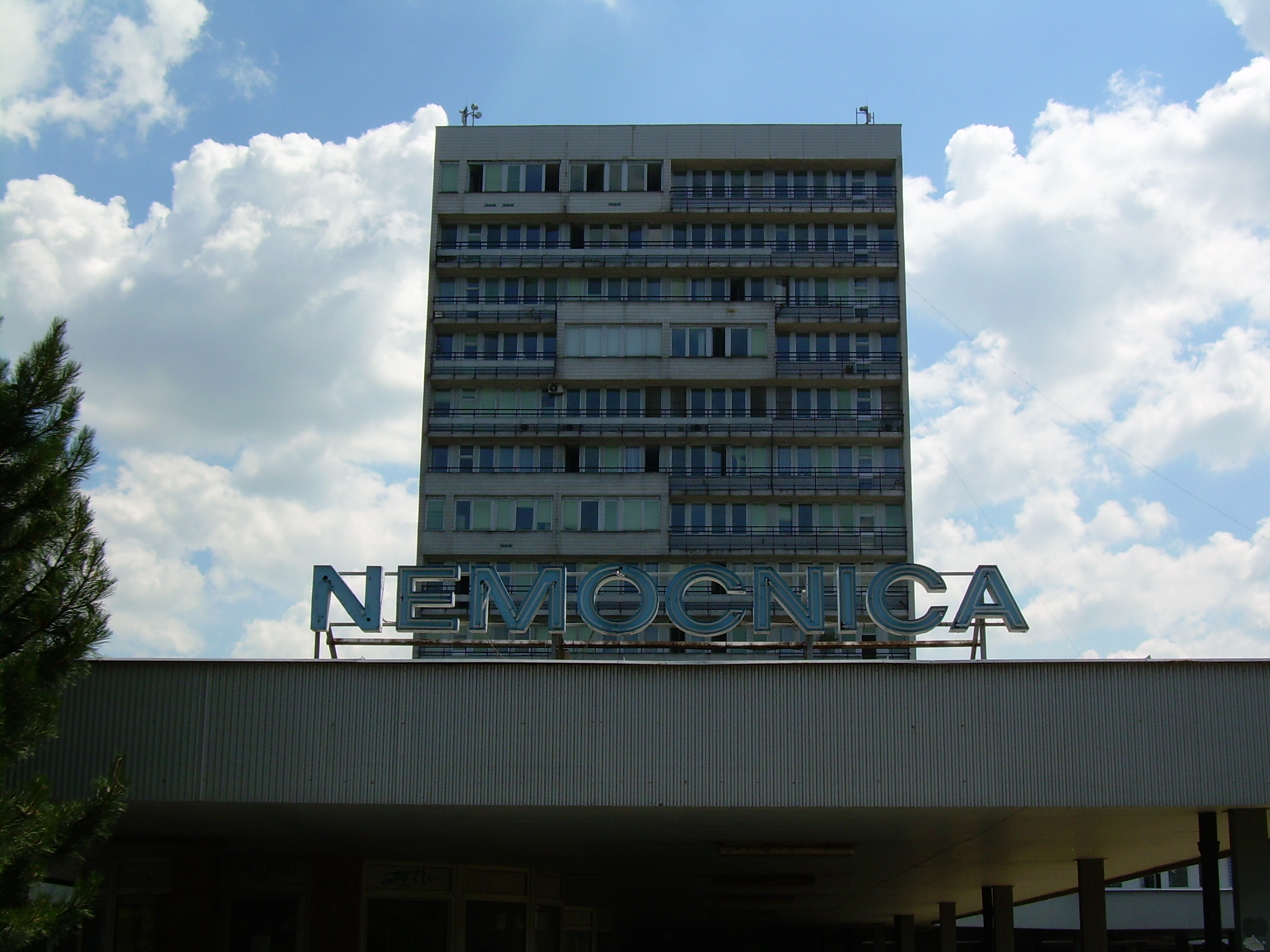
Ružinov hospital

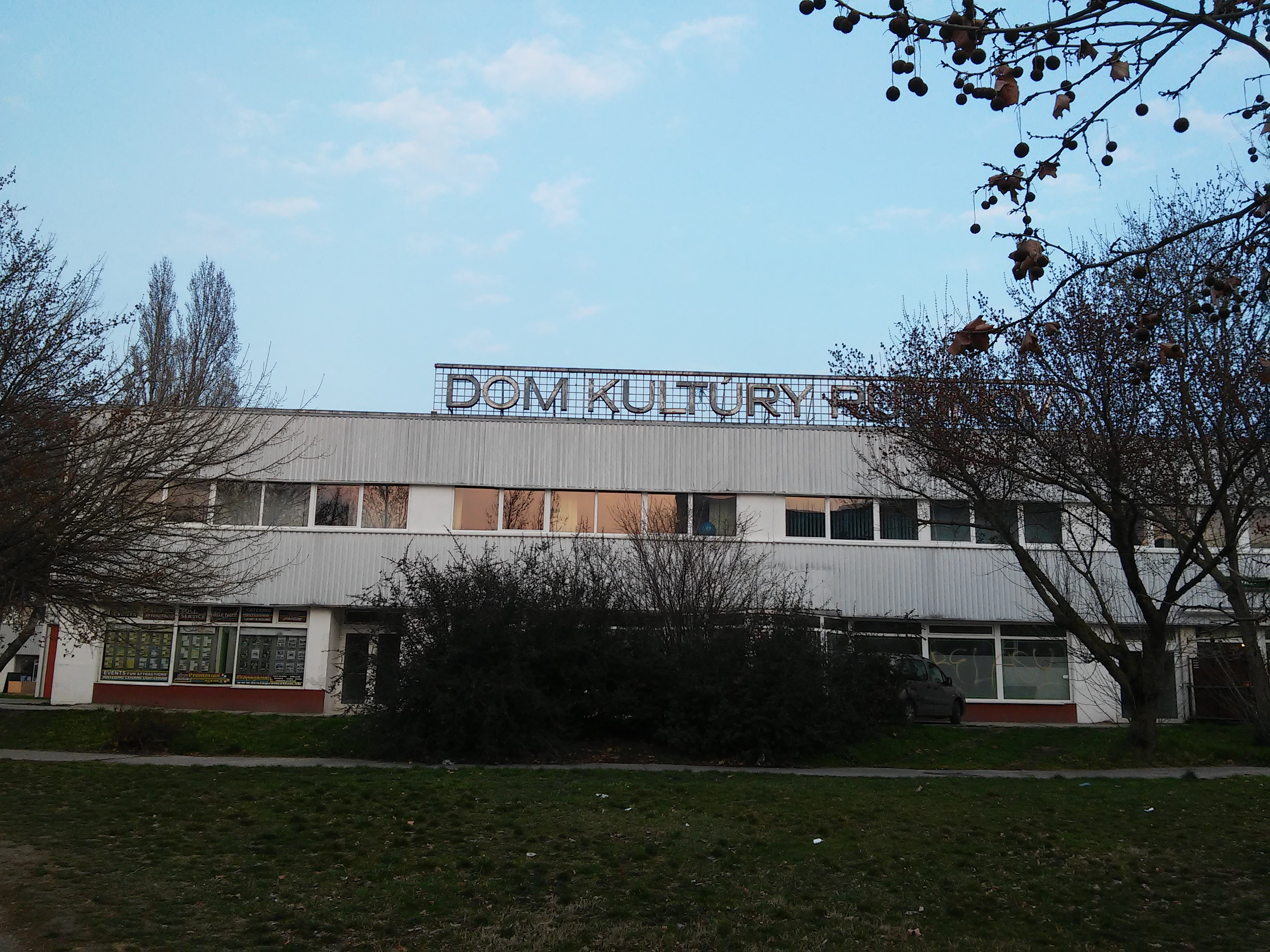
Ružinov House of Culture

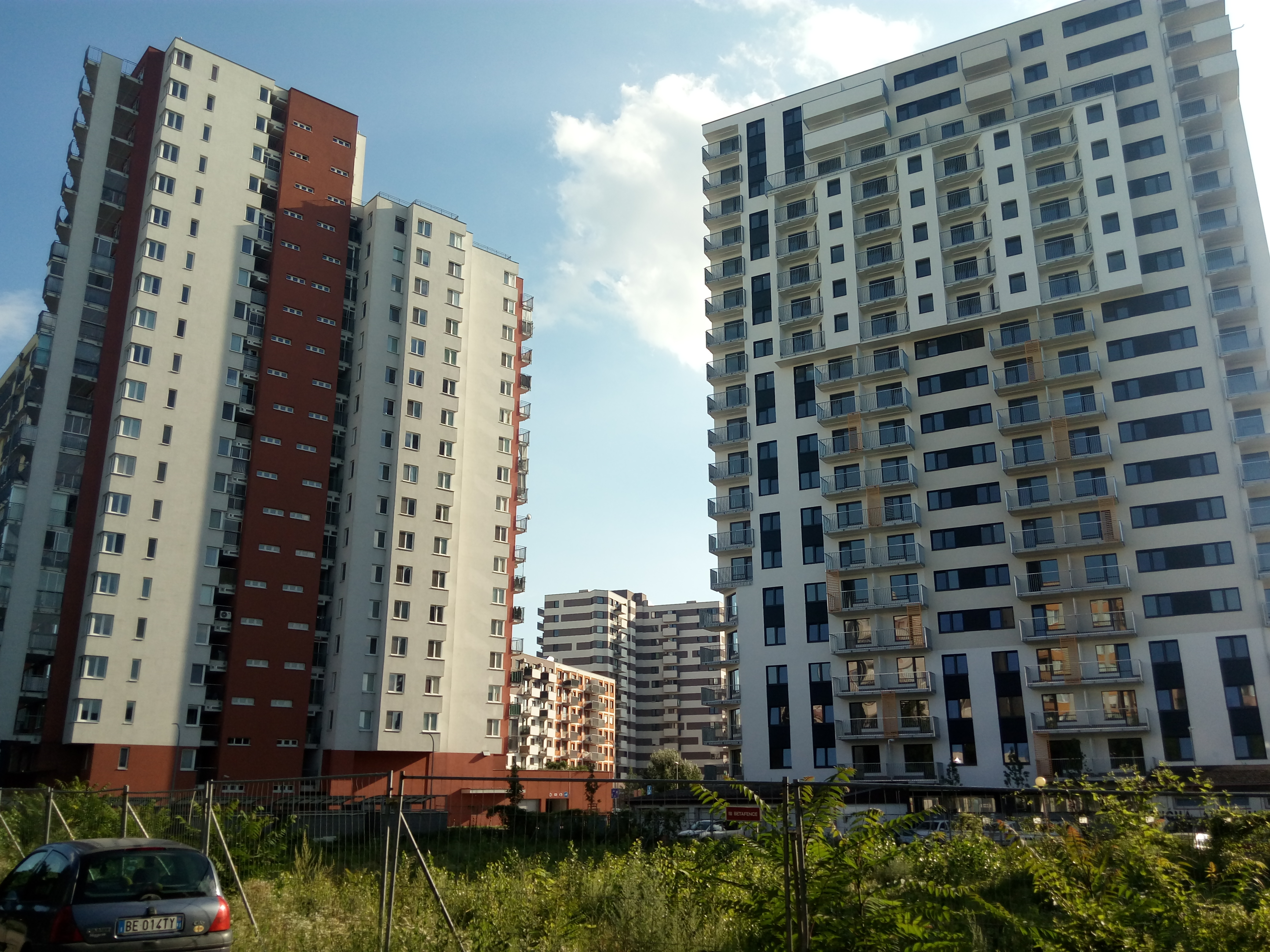
Modern residential buildings on Jégého Street

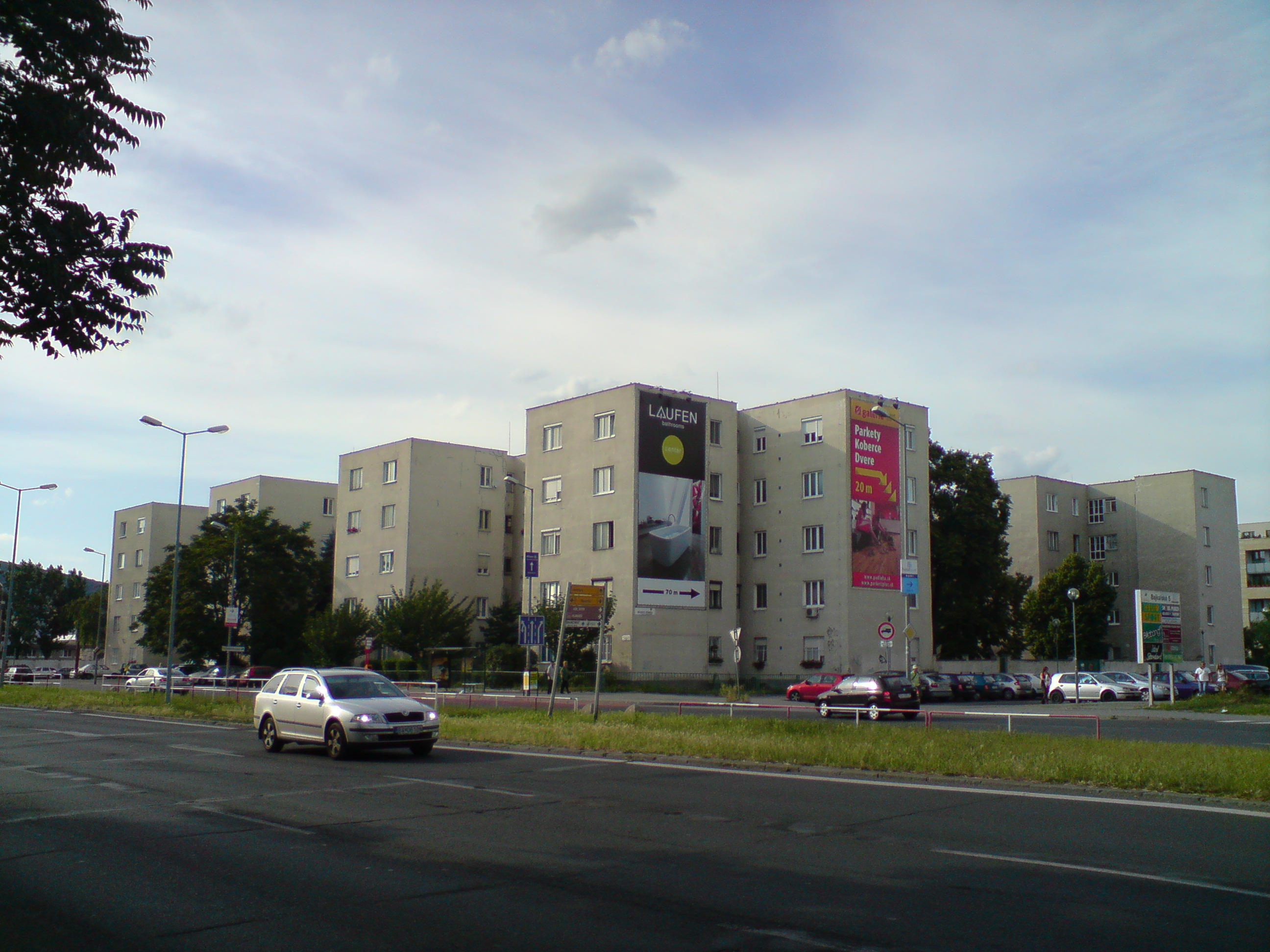
Nová doba residential complex from 1932

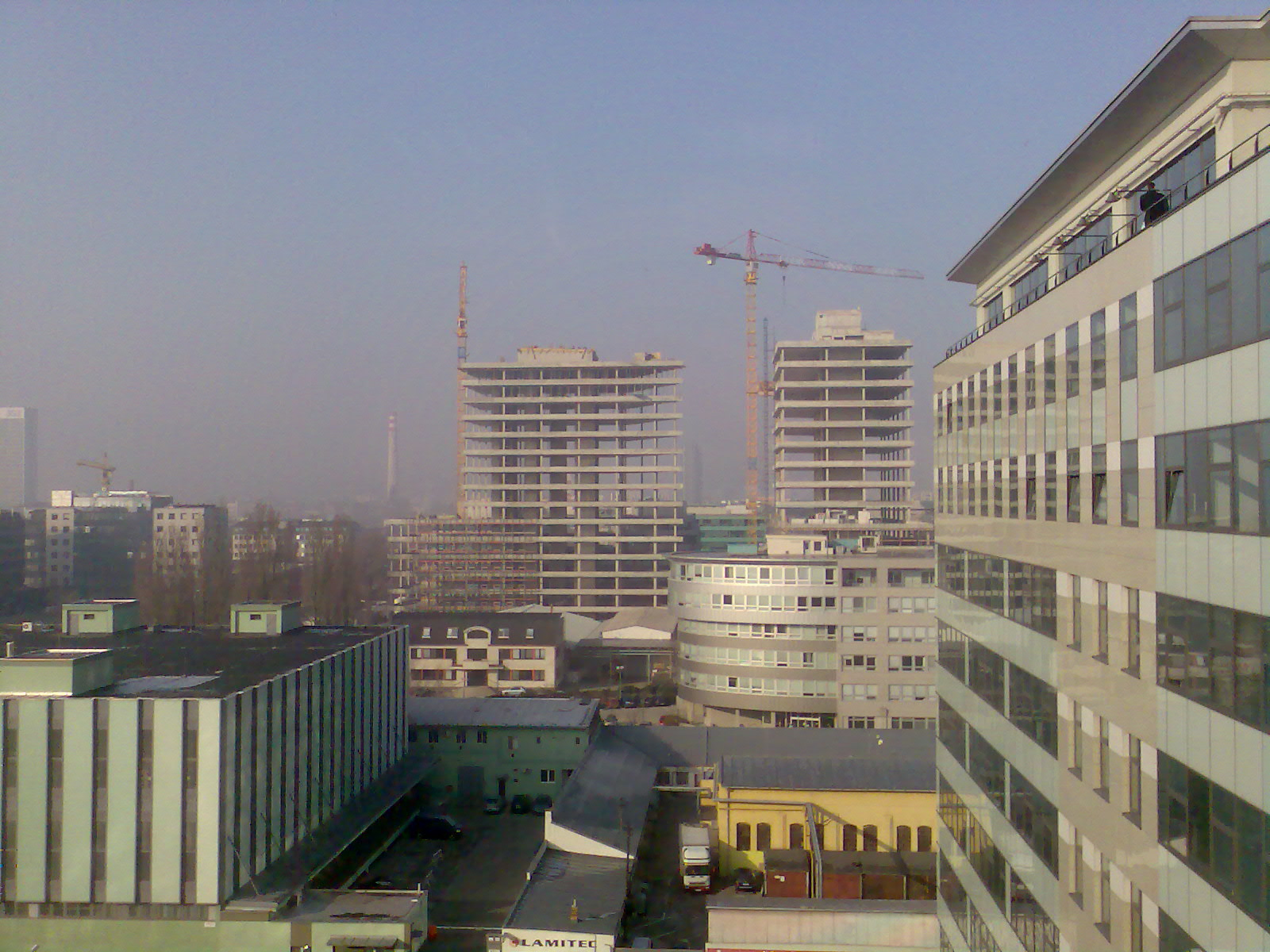
Construction of Apollo Business Center II in the area of Mlynské nivy-West in 2008

List of local cultural monuments of Ružinov
| | Former city hall building in Prievoz (budova býv. radnice v Prievoze) | Radničné námestie (Prievoz neighborhood) | The former Public House is a square puristic structure built in 1931 in the functionalist architectural style according to project by Christian Ludwig and Augustín Danielis. Relief decorations are by Alojz Rigele. |
| | Residential complex around the square - House of the Military Music, Hotel Apollo, Fountain Lovers and residential houses (obytný súbor: dom posádkovej hudby, hotel Apollo, fontána Milenci a bytové domy dotvárajúce námestie) | Dullovo Square (Nivy neighborhood) | Unified urbanisitc and architectural complex of buildings around Dullovo Square from the 1950s and 1960s. The complex features the following structures: Centerpiece of the square is the Fountain Lovers from 1960.; House of the Military Music belonging to the Slovak Military is located inside the square area, originally it was built as a dining facility for the nearby Thread factory (Cvernovka) on Páričkova Street. Resembling a small baroque manor house it was built at the end of the 19th century when the number of employees exceeded 900 and the factory needed additional space for preparing and serving food to the workers. In the 1980s it became the property of the Slovak Military and besides housing the Military Music company it also served as a hospital.; Hotel Apollo was built in 1956-1959, originally named Hotel Dukla, according to project by Štefan Svetko. The building included a hotel with restaurants and on higher floors it housed a hostel, several small apartments and four artist ateliers on the uppermost floors. The residential part of the building had its own entrance that was accessible to the public. Later, conference rooms and a modern lift were added and the whole building was transformed into a hotel.; The square is completed by residential houses No. 7, No. 8, No. 10 and No. 11 by Štefan Svetko, from the southern side by residential houses No. 12, No. 13 and No. 14 and from the northern side by residential houses No. 3, No. 4 and No. 5. |
| | Residential complex by Emil Belluš (obytný súbor – bytová kolónia domov Emila Belluša) | Trenčianska Street No. 34-43, Miletičova Street No. 66-72 (Nivy neighborhood) | Complex of 11 similar free standing residential buildings containing 400 flats built in 1930-1931 according to the 1930 project by Emil Belluš. The construction was paid by the City of Bratislava in order to combat the critical shortage of living spaces especially affordable housing for the working class which became a problem in the 1930s. Young Belluš created the project in 13 days, construction started in July 1930 and by December 1930, first residents were already living in the buildings. 9 houses feature an H floor plan, 2 are built on an L-shaped base (different sources claim 8 houses altogether). Each house is 4 stories tall and consists of two wings with four identical one-room apartments on each floor (32 apartments per building), connected by a central stairway. Each apartment consists of a room, hallway, kitchen, pantry and a toilet. Bathrooms were located centrally on the connecting hallways of the buildings. Today, some of the buildings have been devaluated by constructing modern superstructures on the roof. |
| | Bust of Štefan Marko Daxner (busta Š. M. Daxnera) | Daxnerovo námestie, park | Bust of politician Štefan Marko Daxner by Karol Lacko and Virgil Droppa made of metal alloys atop a marble pillar was unveiled on 21 December 1973. |
| | Relief Mother with a child (reliéf Matky s dieťaťom) | Dohnányho Street No. 1 | The stone relief is located on the facade of the residential house on Dohnányho Street No. 1. It was built at the end of the 1950s by sculptor Jozef Kostka. The work symbolizes motherly love and depicts a half sitting woman playing with her child. |
| | Residential complex Masaryk colony (súbor domov – tzv. Masarykova kolónia) | Okružná Street, Staničná Street, Na lánoch Street, Rozmarínova Street (Trnávka neighborhood) | Complex of residential houses built in the 1920s next to the railway line with a fan shaped footprint. It consists of 30 identical double houses with distinct kinked roofs constructed with an experimental technology of gluing individual wooden segments. |
| | Fountain of Love (Fontána lásky) | Kupeckého Street, behind houses (Nivy neighborhood) | Built in 1985 according to the project by M. Kalina as a movie prop for the hit Czechoslovak movie Fountain for Suzanne (Fontána pre Zuzanu). It was restored and made functional in 2008. |
| | Commemorative plaque of Svetozar Miletić (pamätná tabuľa Svetozára Miletiča) | Miletičova Street No. 56 (Nivy neighborhood) | Plaque commemorating the journalist and politician Svetozar Miletić is made of marble and placed on a concrete pedestal. It is located in the greenery in front of a residential building. |
| | Residential complex (súbor obytných domov) | mostly Miletičova Street 31-65 (Nivy neighborhood) | The residential complex was built in 1951-1954 according to project by K. Paluš and M. Tengler. It was one of the first residential complexes in Bratislava to include civic amenities on the ground floors of the buildings. The structures are decorated by figural sculptures, decorative friezes, terraces and porticos. It is located in an area bordered by Miletičova Street, Trenčianska Street, Ružová dolina Street and Prievozská Street, the eastern part of the area close to Ružová dolina Street consists of another cultural monument - Swimming pool Delfín and five residential towers (kúpalisko Delfín a päť vežových domov). |
| | Former slaughterhouse with an adjacent park (bývalý bitúnok a priľahlý parčík) | Miletičova Street (Nivy neighborhood) | Buildings of the former slaughterhouse consist of a smaller building a tower and a chimney and they form a small central part of the northern side of today's Miletičova market. The small park is located in front of the buildings on the crossroads of Miletičova Street and Záhradnícka Street and it contains a statue of Saint Andrew and abandoned public toilets. |
| | Salesians of Don Bosco house and the Church of Virgin Mary Help of Christians (Dom saleziánov Dona Bosca s kostolom Panny Márie Pomocnice kresťanov) | Miletičova Street No. 7 (Nivy neighborhood) | The original Salesian institute for saving poor and abandoned youth (Saleziánsky ústav a kostol na záchranu chudobnej a opustenej mládeže) was built on the site in the 1930s in functionalist style. The only building that survived is the main building of the institute, a four-story-high building with a semicircular corner. In 1989 or 1990 the Church of Virgin Mary Help of Christians was constructed inside the area according to project by Mr. and Mrs. Weber. |
| | Church of Saint Don Bosco and Salesian Institute at Dornkappl (kostol sv. Dona Bosca a Saleziánsky ústav na Dornkappli) | Okružná Street No. 13 (Trnávka neighborhood) | The towerless church is an example of late functionalist architecture in Bratislava. The cornerstone was laid in 1937 and the church was consecrated in 1939. It was built according to the project by Gabriel Schreiber as a block structure with rectangular footprint. The structure is made of a ferroconcrete skeleton filled with bricks and the interior features a large three-nave pseudo-hall. In the 1960s, sgraffito decorations were added on the main facade of the church. |
| | Andrej Hlinka Park including the Memorial of Andrej Hlinka (park a pomník Andreja Hlinku) | Ružinovská Street (Trávniky neighborhood) | The park was completed in 1979 according to project by Ferdinand Milučký. It features two fountains, benches, pathways and areas isolated from the Ružinovská Street traffic. It was named after communist politician Karol Šmidke and it featured a statue of Šmidke. In 1998, the park was renamed to Andrej Hlinka Park and a memorial plaque to the far-right Catholic priest Andrej Hlinka was installed at the park. In 2007, a bust of Hlinka by T. Baník and S. Májek was added to the plaque. |
| | Delfín swimming pool and five residential towers (kúpalisko Delfín a päť vežových domov) | Ružová dolina Street No. 12-22 (Nivy neighborhood) | Architectonic complex of residential buildings featuring a public swimming pool, considered to represent the best urbanistic residential neighborhood project to be realised in Bratislava in the 1950s and 1960s.: 5 identical residential towers called Palušáky built in 1955-1957 according to project by Karol Paluš which was awarded the Prize of Dušan Jurkovič. Each 12-story tower features four wings.; Delfín swimming pool was built according to project by Architekti Karol Paluš, Hrivňák and Kočí and placed among the five residential towers. Today, the swimming pool is administered by the Bratislava Municipal Fitness and Recreational Facilities Administration (STaRZ). |
| | Bust of Ľudovít Kukoreli (busta Ľudovíta Kukoreliho) | Svätoplukova Street | |
| | Martin's Cemetery - historical gate and walls (Martinský cintorín - pôvodná brána a historické oplotenie) | Trnavská cesta Street | |
| | Residential building with communial balcony (bytový dom s pavlačou) | Záhradnícka Street No. 63 (Nivy neighborhood) | |
| | Lutheran Church in Prievoz (Evanjelický kostol a.v. v Prievoze) | Radničné námestie No. 2 (Prievoz neighborhood) | |
| | Main cross (hlavný kríž) | Kaštieľska Street, Prievoz cemetery (Prievoz neighborhood) | |
| | Huber family tombstone (náhrobok rodiny Huber) | Kaštieľska Street, Prievoz cemetery (Prievoz neighborhood) | |
| | Karol Furst tombstone (náhrobok K. Fursta) | Kaštieľska Street, Prievoz cemetery (Prievoz neighborhood) | |
| | House of mourning (dom smútku) | Kaštieľska Street, Prievoz cemetery (Prievoz neighborhood) | |
| | Church of Saint Vincent de Paul (Kostol sv. Vincenta de Paul) | Tomášikova Street | |
| | Statue of Saint Andrew (socha sv. Ondreja) | Záhradnícka Street (Nivy neighborhood) | |
| | Building of the Ministry of Interior of the Slovak Republic (budova Ministerstva vnútra) | Pribinova Street No. 2 (Nivy neighborhood) | |
| | Area of the former Ludwig Mill (bývalý Ludwigov mlyn s areálom) | Metodova Street | |
