= Big Brother Česko & Slovensko =

- Presented by: Míra Hejda
- No. of days: 62
- No. of housemates: 16
- Winner: Stanislav Liška
- Runner-up: Zoe Black
- Location: Sofia, Bulgaria
- No. of episodes: 62

Release
- Original network: Czech Republic: TV Nova; Nova Fun; Voyo Czech (stream); Slovak: TV Markíza; Voyo Slovak (stream)
- Original release: 13 November 2023 – 13 January 2024

Big Brother Česko & Slovensko is the joint Czech Republic and Slovak edition of the international Big Brother franchise. The show broadcast by TV Nova and Markíza, with episodes released on the streaming service Voyo.

The show premiered on Voyo on 13 November 2023, followed by its television premiere on TV Nova and TV Markíza the following day. The season concluded with a live final on 13 January 2024, when Stanislav Liška was declared the winner and received a prize of €100,000 (CZK 2.5 million).

The Czech-Slovak edition followed earlier separate Czech and Slovak versions of the format, both of which aired in 2005. The Czech version, broadcast by TV Nova, was won by David Šín, while the Slovak edition, Big Brother: Súboj, broadcast by Markíza, was won by Richard Tkáč.

== Production ==
In June 2023, TV Nova and Markíza announced that they were preparing a new Czech-Slovak version of Big Brother. The broadcasters described the project as a new generation of the format for audiences in both countries, with casting conducted jointly in the Czech Republic and Slovakia. The revived show was officially titled Big Brother Česko & Slovensko. It was presented by Czech television personality and entrepreneur Míra Hejda.

Sixteen Czech and Slovak housemates entered the house at the beginning of the series. The house was located in Sofia, Bulgaria. It was monitored by 58 cameras, with the contestants isolated from the outside world. The house included living areas, a kitchen and dining area, bedrooms, a bathroom, a garden and other facilities, as well as a Confessional (Diary Room as it is known in Czech and Slovak).

The show was aired on the streaming service Voyo in both the Czech Republic and Slovakia. New episodes were made available daily, while Voyo also provided a live stream from the house. Saturday eviction episodes were broadcast live on Voyo, with viewers determining the housemate to be evicted through a public vote.

In the Czech Republic, episodes were released on Voyo before their television broadcast on Nova Fun. Nova Fun generally aired each episode one day after its Voyo release.

In Slovakia, the show was broadcast on TV Markíza and TV Doma in addition to its availability on Voyo. The live eviction episodes were broadcast on TV Doma, while the regular episodes formed part of the show's television schedule on TV Markíza.

=== Live stream ===
Voyo provided a live stream from the Big Brother house throughout the series. The live stream was available daily from 16:00 to 18:00. Voyo also broadcast the Saturday eviction episodes on live stream, during which viewers decided which nominated housemate would leave the house.

=== Pre-launch influencer event ===
On 12 November 2023, one day before the official launch, a group of Czech and Slovak influencers spent less than 24 hours in the Big Brother house as part of an influencer mission organised ahead of the series. Among them were Adriana Brabencová from Love Island and content creators Ivan Kloc, known as Kid Ajvn, and Jaroslav Oláh. During their stay, the influencers had their mobile phones confiscated by Big Brother and were given challenges and tasks to complete. The participants earned credits through the tasks, which could be used to purchase food for the group. They also experienced some of the facilities of the house, including its relaxation area, exercise equipment, treadmill and swimming pool. The influencer mission lasted approximately 24 hours and was completed before the arrival of the show's actual housemates. TV Nova explicitly distinguished the participants in the mission from the real housemates, who entered the house for the competition afterwards. The influencer event therefore did not form part of the official competition or its day count.

== Format ==
The show follows the basic format of the international Big Brother franchise. Contestants, referred to as housemates, live together in an isolated house under continuous surveillance by cameras and microphones. The contestants were monitored continuously and were required to complete tasks and missions set by Big Brother. Failure to complete certain missions could result in punishments. Contestants were also prohibited from maintaining contact with the outside world and were not allowed to use mobile phones, computers or other communication devices.

The show also introduced a special "Master of House (Pán Domu)" position, which provided the holder with additional privileges, including a private bedroom and the ability to influence aspects of life in the house. Each week, housemates participated in a nomination process to determine which contestants would be at risk of eviction. The final decision was made by viewers through the official Big Brother application. Eviction episodes were broadcast live, with one or more housemates leaving the house depending on the stage of the competition.

== Housemates ==
Name	Age on entry	Residence	Country	Occupation	Day entered	Day exited	Result
Stanislav Liška	27	Čelákovice	Czech	Prop maker	Day 1	Day 62	Winner
Zoe Black	29	Prague	Czech	Visual merchandiser	Day 1	Day 62	Runner-up
Barbara Hacsi	37	Prague	Czech	Radio presenter	Day 1	Day 62	Third Place
Katrin Slabá	24	Šterusy	Slovakia	Freelancer	Day 1	Day 62	Fourth place
František Uvíra	36	Prague	Czech	Fitness Trainer	Day 1	Day 62	Fifth place
Tarik Lukšija	22	Brno	Czech	Professional futsal player	Day 1	Day 59	Evicted
Karolína Pištěková	30	Hořice	Czech	Yoga teacher	Day 1	Day 59	Evicted
Ella Nemetzová	38	Topoľnica	Slovakia	Marketing Expert	Day 1	Day 55	Evicted
Petra Chelíková	46	Vyškov	Czech	Beauty salon owner	Day 1	Day 48	Evicted
Vítek Ehrenberger	26	Prague	Czech	Entrepreneur	Day 1	Day 41	Evicted
Soňa Machyňáková	28	Prague	Czech	Television and radio presenter	Day 1	Day 34	Evicted
David Takáč	37	Senec	Slovakia	Personal trainer	Day 1	Day 31	Ejected
Tereza Kostínková	27	Vimperk	Czech	Customer service specialist	Day 1	Day 27	Evicted
Roland Obertin	43	Germany (originally from Želovce)	Slovakia	Entrepreneur	Day 1	Day 20	Evicted
Andrej Kudimov	33	Prague	Czech	Entrepreneur	Day 1	Day 13	Evicted
Kristýna Burešová	26	Prague	Czech	Barmaid	Day 1	Day 6	Evicted

== Nominations table ==
N/A: Undisclosed Nominations, not broadcast in the show or the housemate did not give a name.
: Master of House had three nomination points, which could be distributed between two housemates. X:The Master of House did not use their third nomination point power.

	Week 1	Week 2	Week 3	Week 4	Week 5	Week 6		Week 7	Week 8	Week 9		
	Week 1	Week 2	Week 3	Week 4	Week 5	Week 6		Week 7	Week 8	Day 55	Final	
Master(s) of House	Zoe	Stanislav	Tereza	David; Vítek	none	Petra		Katrin	Barbara	none		
Stanislav	Kristýna; František	2-Katrin; 1-Soňa	Katrin; Zoe	Katrin; Soňa	Vítek; Soňa	Katrin; Barbara		Petra; Tarik	Katrin; Tarik	No nominations	Winner (Day 62)	
Zoe	1-Tereza; 1-Andrej; X	Soňa; Katrin	Roland; Stanislav	Tereza; Stanislav	Stanislav; Vítek	Katrin; Stanislav		Tarik; František	Karolina; Katrin	No nominations	Runner-up (Day 62)	
Barbara	Kristýna; Vítek	Katrin; Andrej	František; Roland	František; Tereza	Karolína; František	Katrin; Tarik		František; Tarik	2-Stanislav; 1-Karolína	No nominations	Third place (Day 62)	
Katrin	Tereza; Andrej	Tereza; Andrej	Roland; František	Soňa; František	Vítek; Soňa	Ella; Barbara		2-Ella; 1-Barbara	Ella; Stanislav	No nominations	Fourth plcae (Day 62)	
František	Tereza; N/A	Roland; Ella	Roland; Ella	Barbara; Petra	Soňa; Vítek	Barbara; Katrin		Barbara; Ella	Ella; Tarik	No nominations	Fifth place (Day 62)	
Tarik	Vítek; Tereza	Karolína; Petra	Karolína; Roland	Tereza; Soňa	Vítek; Soňa	Ella; Zoe		Petra; Ella	Karolína; Ella	No nominations	Evicted (Day 59)	
Karolína	Tereza; Kristýna	Katrin; Roland	Zoe; Soňa	Soňa; Barbara	Petra; Zoe	Secret Room (Day 34)	Barbara; Ella	Ella; Zoe	Zoe; Ella; Tarik	No nominations	Evicted (Day 59)	
Ella	Kristýna; Karolína	Karolína; Katrin	Roland; Karolína	František; Soňa	Soňa; Karolína	Katrin; Tarik		Tarik; Petra	Katrin; Tarik	Evicted (Day 55)		
Petra	František; N/A	Tarik; František	Katrin; Roland	Tereza; František	Karolína; Vítek	2-Katrin; 1-Stanislav		Tarik; Ella	Evicted (Day 48)			
Vítek	Kristýna; Katrin	Andrej; Katrin	Katrin; Roland	2-Tereza; 1-Stanislav	Stanislav; Katrin	Secret Room (Day 34)	Stanislav; Katrin	Evicted (Day 41)				
Soňa	Roland; Petra	Katrin; Andrej	Roland; Ella	František; Katrin	Stanislav; Katrin	Evicted (Day 34)						
David	Kristýna; Vítek	Andrej; Karolína	Zoe; Ella	2-Karolína; 1-Zoe	Ejected (Day 31)							
Tereza	Kristýna; Soňa	Barbara; Katrin	2-Katrin; 1-Zoe	Barbara; Soňa	Evicted (Day 27)							
Roland	David; Andrej	Katrin; Soňa	Katrin; Soňa	Evicted (Day 20)								
Andrej	Kristýna; František	Katrin; Soňa	Evicted (Day 13)									
Kristýna	Andrej; František	Evicted (Day 6)										
Notes	none				1	2		3	4	5		
Against public vote	Andrej; František; Kristýna; Tereza	Andrej; Karolína; Katrin; Soňa	Ella; Katrin; Roland; Zoe	František; Tereza; Soňa	Karolína; Soňa; Stanislav; Vítek	Barbara; Karolína; Katrin; Vítek		Barbara; Ella; František; Petra; Tarik	Ella; Tarik; Zoe	Barbara; František; Karolína; Katrin; Stanislav; Tarik; Zoe	Barbara; František; Katrin; Stanislav; Zoe	
Ejected	none				David	none						
Evicted	Kristýna; Most votes to evict	Andrej; Most votes to evict	Roland; Most votes to evict	Tereza; Most votes to evict	Soňa; Fewest votes (out of 4) to save	Vítek; Fewest votes to save		Petra; Fewest votes to save	Ella; Fewest votes to save	Karolína; Fewest votes to save	František; Fewest votes to win	Katrin; Fewest votes to win
Evicted	Kristýna; Most votes to evict	Andrej; Most votes to evict	Roland; Most votes to evict	Tereza; Most votes to evict	Karolína; Fewer votes (out of 4) to save	Vítek; Fewest votes to save		Petra; Fewest votes to save	Ella; Fewest votes to save	Karolína; Fewest votes to save	Barbara; Fewest votes to win	Zoe; Fewest votes to win
Evicted	Kristýna; Most votes to evict	Andrej; Most votes to evict	Roland; Most votes to evict	Tereza; Most votes to evict	Vítek; Fewer votes (out of 4) to save	Vítek; Fewest votes to save		Petra; Fewest votes to save	Ella; Fewest votes to save	Tarik; Fewest votes to save	Stanislav; Most votes to win	

Notes

- ^Note 1: The format of the public vote was reversed: viewers voted for the housemate they wanted to save rather than evict. Stanislav received the most votes and therefore safe from the eviction. Soňa received the fewest votes and was evicted, later the host announced that only the one who got the most votes stays. Vít and Karolína were apparently evicted but were secretly moved to the Secret Room.
- ^Note 2: Vít and Karolína spent three days in the Secret Room before returning to the main house and participating in nominations again. However, they were automatically nominated for the next public vote. They were also not eligible to receive nominations from other housemates.
- ^Note 3: Karolína was immune from nomination after winning an additional immunity challenge during the week. Also gave her the power to automatically nominate one housemate for the following week's eviction vote.
- ^Note 4: Zoe was automatically nominated by Karolína as a consequence of a power Karolína obtained during the previous week's challenge.
- ^Note 5: No nominations took place for the final week. The remaining five housemates competed in the final public vote to determine the winner. Stanislav received the most votes and won the series.
