= Nižná =

Nižná may refer to several villages and municipalities in Slovakia:

- Nižná, Piešťany District
- Nižná, Tvrdošín District
