= Dorota Pospíšilová =

Slovak viticulturist (born 1930)

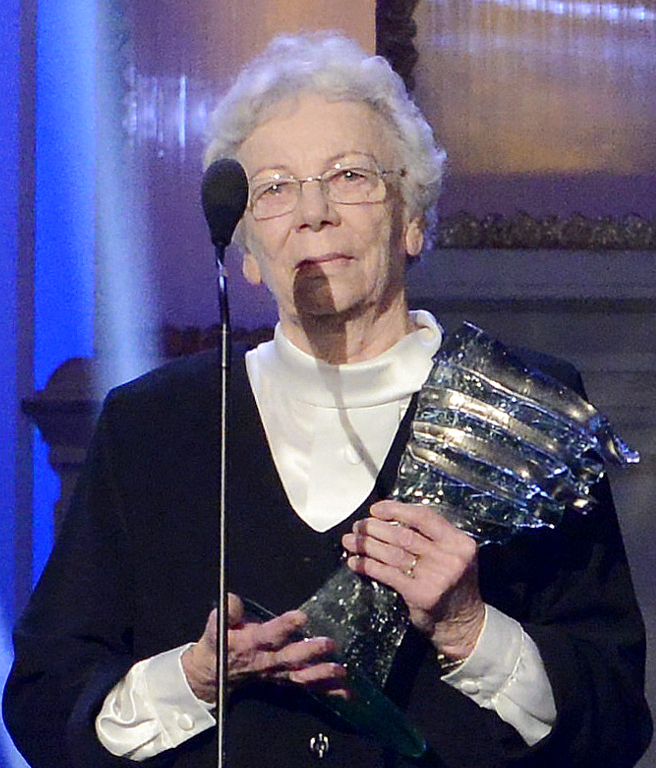
- Born: 13 February 1930 (age 96); Bratislava, Czechoslovakia
- Occupations: Winemaker, viticulturist and writer
- Awards: Order of Ľudovít Štúr 2nd class State Award of Alexander Dubček

Dorota Pospíšilová (born 13 February 1930) is a Slovak winemaker, viticulturist and writer. She has developed 24 new varieties of grape that are grown in Slovakia.

== Biography ==
Pospíšilová was born on 13 February 1930 in Bratislava, Czechoslovakia. Her father was Moravian and her mother was Viennese.

Pospíšilová studied at the Slovak University of Agriculture in Košice. After graduating, Pospíšilová worked at the Research Institute for Viticulture in Bratislava and at the Plant Production Research Institute in Borovce near Piešťany. She specialised in viticulture.

Pospíšilová has developed 24 new varieties of grape that are grown in Slovakia, including Breslava, Děvín, Diamant, Dunaj, Helios, Hetera, Hron, Mars, Nitranka, Rimava, Rosa, Rubanka, Rudava, Torysa, and Váh.

== Awards ==
- Order of Ľudovít Štúr 2nd class (1998)
- Crystal Wing Award (2014)
- Slovak Academy of Sciences (SAV)'s commemorative medal (2023)

== Publications ==
- Ampelography of Czechoslovakia (1981)
- New Vine Breeding in Slovakia (1998)
- Ampelography of Slovakia (2005)
- Wild Grape: Vitis vinifera ssp and its occurrence in Slovakia (2019)
