= Pusta Ves =

Coordinates: 48°39′N 17°41′E

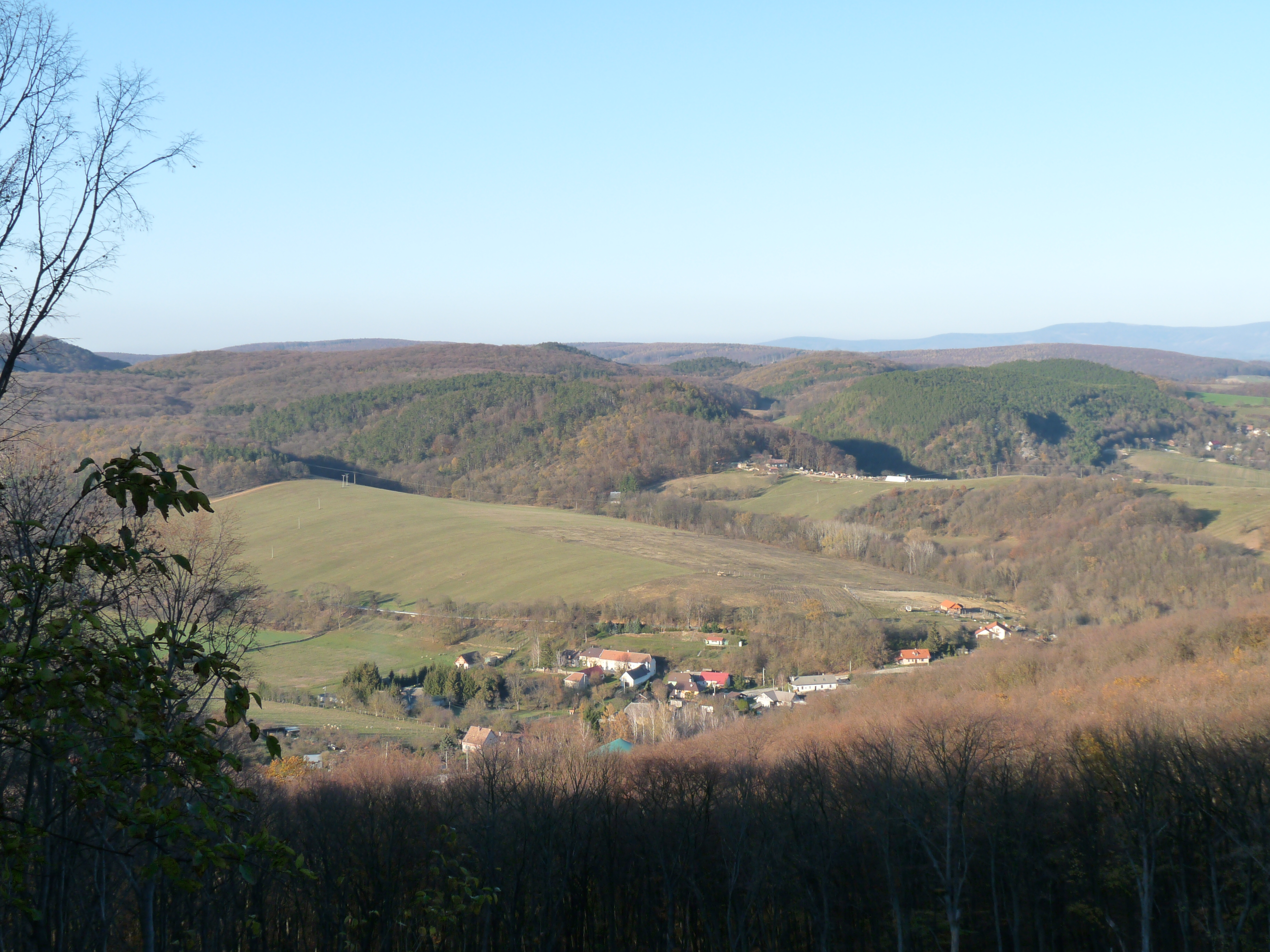
Pusta Ves

Pusta Ves is a village in the municipality of Prašník in Piešťany District in the Trnava Region of western Slovakia.

It is a hub of marked hiking trails through the surrounding forests.

Pusta Ves is located at an altitude of 250 meters at the foot of the Little Carpathians, 18 km west of the spa town of Piestany. Pusta Ves means remote village. The small community is surrounded by high hills and vast forests. The village is divided into an upper and lower part: Horna Pusta Ves and Dolná Pusta Ves.

During Slovak independence from 1939 to 1945, people with Czech or Jewish background found refuge in and around the village.

Since Slovakia August 29. 1944 was at war with Germany the remote village immediately was a gathering and command center for partisans who fought against German soldiers. The village men were imprisoned in Trenčín and two houses were burned by fascists. The village women organized catering, maintenance of uniforms and transporting weapons for partisans. The partisans later received support of the Red Army partisans. The village did not experience massacre and most prisoners could return home after the end of war in 1945. In 1968, the village had Red Star hero status. At the burial site with partisans grave in front of the village is a small museum and an amphitheater where there are antifascist manifestation, display of partisans fight and market on every year on August 29.
