= Kočín-Lančár =

- Municipality
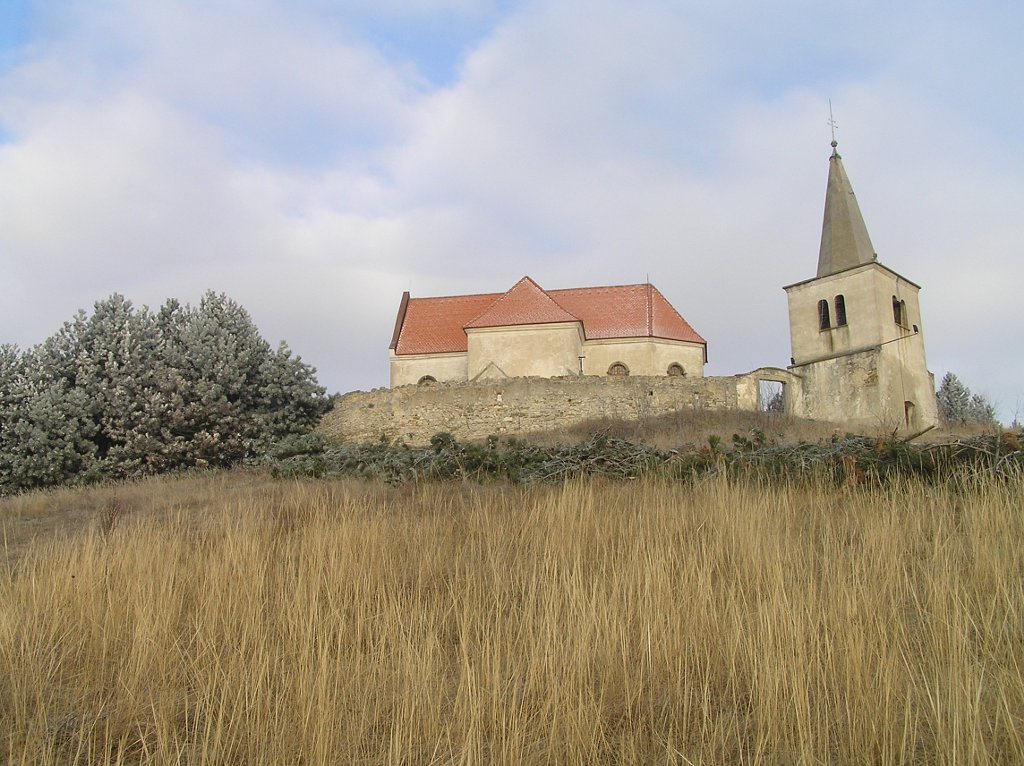
- Saint Michael's church, Kočín-Lančár

- Flag

- Location of Kočín-Lančár in the Trnava Region Location of Kočín-Lančár in Slovakia
- Coordinates: 48.60°N 17.66°E
- Country: Slovakia
- Region: Trnava Region
- District: Piešťany District
- First mentioned: 1262

Area
  - Total: 13.11 km^{2} (5.06 sq mi)
- Elevation: 226 m (741 ft)

Population (2025)
  - Total: 504
- Time zone: UTC+1 (CET)
  - Summer (DST): UTC+2 (CEST)
- Postal code: 922 04
- Area code: +421 33
- Vehicle registration plate (until 2022): PN
- Website: www.kocinlancar.sk

Kočín-Lančár (Hungarian: Köcsény-Lancsár or Köcsénylancsár) is a village and municipality in Piešťany District in the Trnava Region of western Slovakia.

== History ==
In historical records the village was first mentioned in 1262.

== Geography ==
The municipality lies at an altitude of 226 metres (741 ft) and covers an area of 13.11 km^{2} (5.06 sq mi) (2025).

== Population ==
Population statistic (10 years)
Year	1995	2005	2015	2025
Count	532	516	523	504
Difference		−3.00%	+1.35%	−3.63%

Population statistic
Year	2024	2025
Count	503	504
Difference		+0.19%

It has a population of 504 people (31 December 2025).

=== Ethnicity ===
Census 2021 (1+ %)
Ethnicity	Number	Fraction
Slovak	498	95.95%
Not found out	19	3.66%
Total	519	

In year 2021 was 519 people by ethnicity 498 as Slovak, 19 as Not found out, 3 as Czech, 3 as Russian, 3 as Romanian, 1 as French and 1 as English.

Note on population: The difference values of population numbers in the table "Population statistic" and in the sections "Ethnicity" & "Religion" is caused by the use of various statistical methods.

=== Religion ===
Census 2021 (1+ %)
Religion	Number	Fraction
Roman Catholic Church	414	79.77%
None	68	13.1%
Not found out	18	3.47%
Evangelical Church	10	1.93%
Total	519	

In year 2021 was 519 people by religion 414 from Roman Catholic Church, 68 from None, 18 from Not found out, 10 from Evangelical Church, 3 from Paganism and natural spirituality, 3 from Christian Congregations in Slovakia, 1 from Other, 1 from Greek Catholic Church and 1 from Seventh-day Adventist Church.

== Genealogical resources ==
The records for genealogical research are available at the state archive "Statny Archiv in Bratislava, Slovakia"

- Roman Catholic church records (births/marriages/deaths): 1703-1928 (parish B)

== See also ==
- List of municipalities and towns in Slovakia
