= Veľké Orvište =

- Municipality
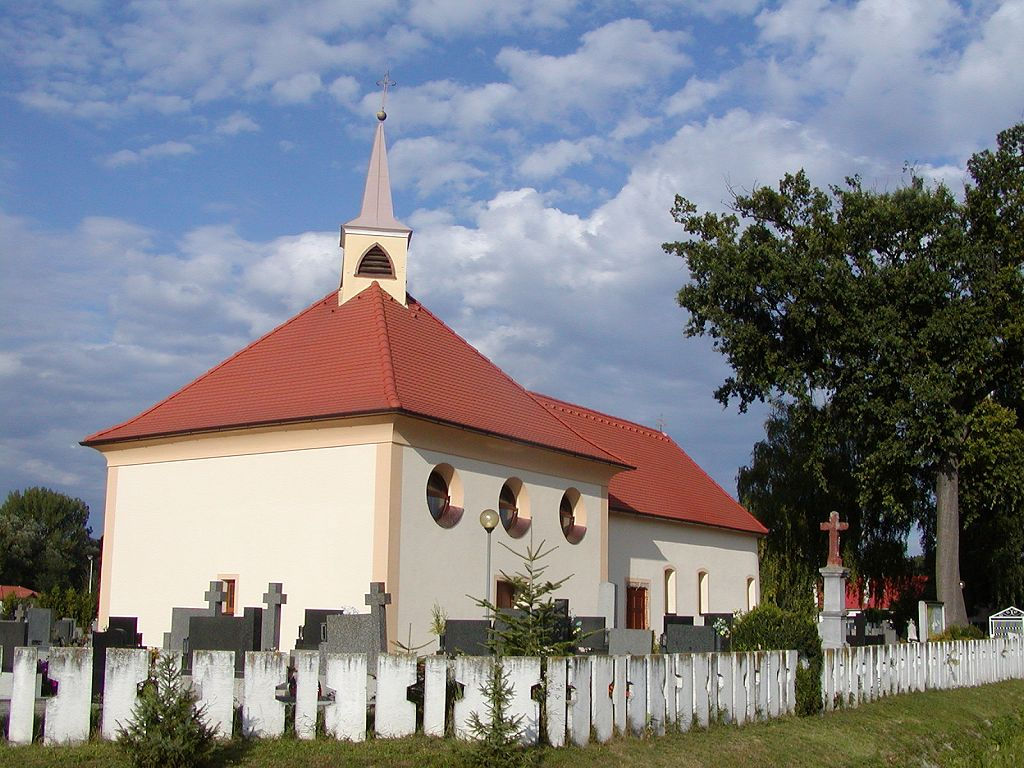

- Flag

- Location of Veľké Orvište in the Trnava Region Location of Veľké Orvište in Slovakia
- Coordinates: 48.62°N 17.80°E
- Country: Slovakia
- Region: Trnava Region
- District: Piešťany District
- First mentioned: 1113

Area
  - Total: 3.83 km^{2} (1.48 sq mi)
- Elevation: 163 m (535 ft)

Population (2025)
  - Total: 1,073
- Time zone: UTC+1 (CET)
  - Summer (DST): UTC+2 (CEST)
- Postal code: 922 01
- Area code: +421 33
- Vehicle registration plate (until 2022): PN
- Website: www.velkeorviste.sk

Veľké Orvište (Hungarian: Nagyőrvistye) is a village and municipality in Piešťany District in the Trnava Region of western Slovakia.

== History ==
The village was first mentioned in historical records in 1113.

== Geography ==
The municipality lies at an altitude of 163 metres (535 ft) and covers an area of 3.83 km^{2} (1.48 sq mi) (2025).

== Population ==
Population statistic (10 years)
Year	1995	2005	2015	2025
Count	980	1031	1060	1073
Difference		+5.20%	+2.81%	+1.22%

Population statistic
Year	2024	2025
Count	1046	1073
Difference		+2.58%

It has a population of 1073 people (31 December 2025).

=== Ethnicity ===
Census 2021 (1+ %)
Ethnicity	Number	Fraction
Slovak	946	89.24%
Not found out	109	10.28%
Total	1060	

In year 2021 was 1060 people by ethnicity 946 as Slovak, 109 as Not found out, 9 as Other, 8 as Czech, 4 as Ukrainian, 4 as German, 2 as Hungarian, 1 as Rusyn, 1 as Russian, 1 as Austrian, 1 as Polish, 1 as Bulgarian and 1 as English.

Note on population: The difference values of population numbers in the table "Population statistic" and in the sections "Ethnicity" & "Religion" is caused by the use of various statistical methods.

=== Religion ===
Census 2021 (1+ %)
Religion	Number	Fraction
Roman Catholic Church	735	69.34%
None	156	14.72%
Not found out	105	9.91%
Evangelical Church	25	2.36%
Total	1060	

In year 2021 was 1060 people by religion 735 from Roman Catholic Church, 156 from None, 105 from Not found out, 25 from Evangelical Church, 8 from Jehovah's Witnesses, 7 from Ad hoc movements, 6 from Other, 5 from Eastern Orthodox Church, 4 from Islam, 3 from Greek Catholic Church, 3 from Seventh-day Adventist Church, 1 from Paganism and natural spirituality, 1 from Other and not ascertained christian church and 1 from Buddhism.
