= Ostrov, Piešťany District =

Ostrov
- Municipality
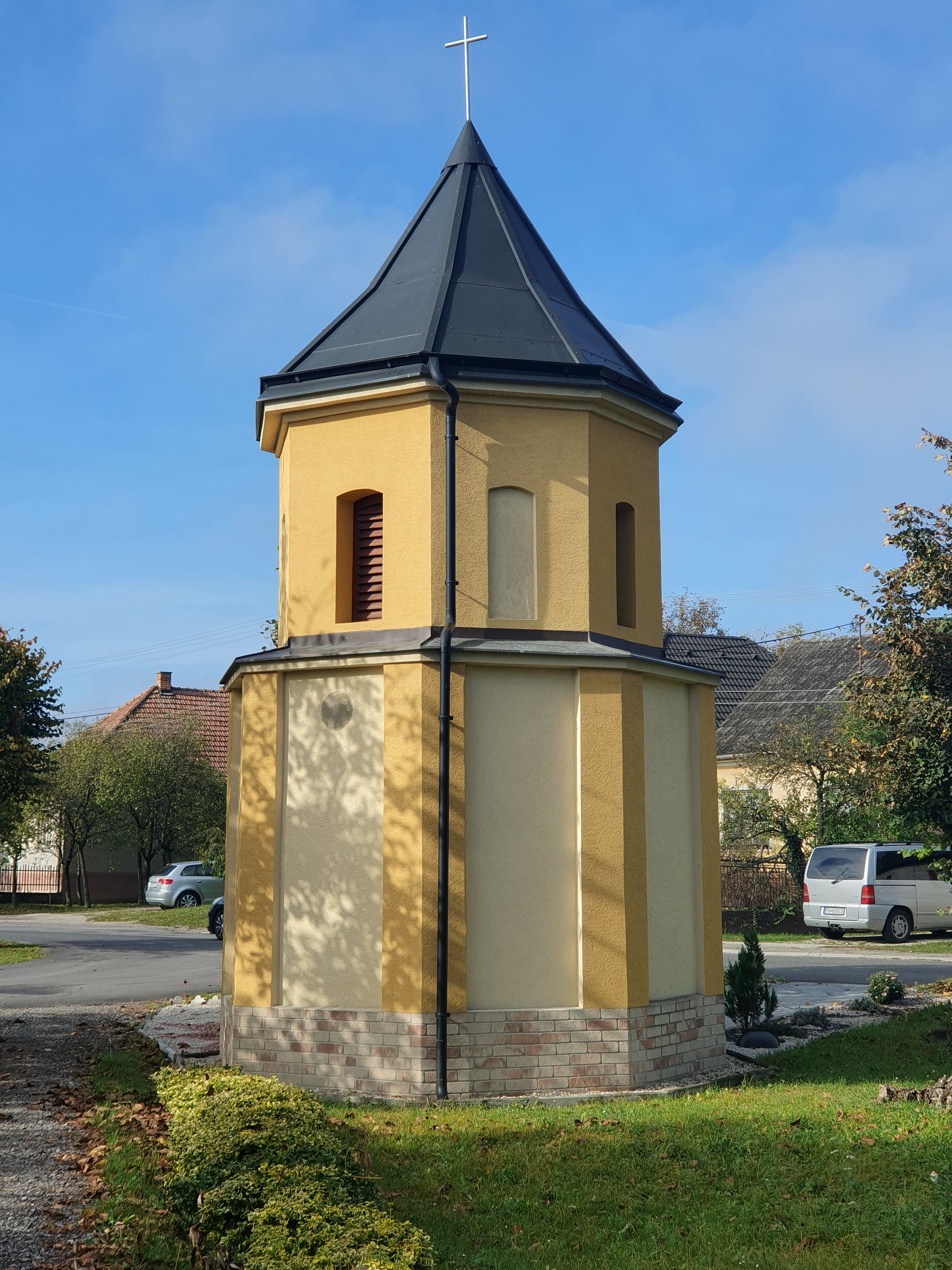

- Flag

- Location of Ostrov in the Trnava Region Location of Ostrov in Slovakia
- Coordinates: 48°37′45″N 17°45′57″E
- Country: Slovakia
- Region: Trnava Region
- District: Piešťany District
- First mentioned: 1431

Area
  - Total: 9.35 km^{2} (3.61 sq mi)
- Elevation: 163 m (535 ft)

Population (2025)
  - Total: 1,217
- Time zone: UTC+1 (CET)
  - Summer (DST): UTC+2 (CEST)
- Postal code: 922 01
- Area code: +421 33
- Vehicle registration plate (until 2022): PN
- Website: www.obecostrov.sk

Ostrov (Hungarian: Osztró) is a village and municipality in Piešťany District in the Trnava Region of western Slovakia.

== History ==
In historical records the village was first mentioned in 1431.

== Geography ==
The municipality lies at an altitude of 163 metres (535 ft) and covers an area of 9.35 km^{2} (3.61 sq mi) (2025).

== Population ==
Population statistic (10 years)
Year	1995	2005	2015	2025
Count	1166	1176	1226	1217
Difference		+0.85%	+4.25%	−0.73%

Population statistic
Year	2024	2025
Count	1210	1217
Difference		+0.57%

It has a population of 1217 people (31 December 2025).

=== Ethnicity ===
Census 2021 (1+ %)
Ethnicity	Number	Fraction
Slovak	1172	97.34%
Not found out	29	2.4%
Total	1204	

In year 2021 was 1204 people by ethnicity 1172 as Slovak, 29 as Not found out, 11 as Other, 7 as Czech, 3 as Serbian, 2 as German, 2 as Moravian, 2 as Hungarian, 1 as Ukrainian, 1 as Croatian and 1 as Bulgarian.

Note on population: The difference values of population numbers in the table "Population statistic" and in the sections "Ethnicity" & "Religion" is caused by the use of various statistical methods.

=== Religion ===
Census 2021 (1+ %)
Religion	Number	Fraction
Roman Catholic Church	885	73.5%
None	221	18.36%
Evangelical Church	37	3.07%
Not found out	32	2.66%
Total	1204	

In year 2021 was 1204 people by religion 885 from Roman Catholic Church, 221 from None, 37 from Evangelical Church, 32 from Not found out, 6 from Other, 5 from Other and not ascertained christian church, 5 from Ad hoc movements, 4 from Christian Congregations in Slovakia, 3 from Jehovah's Witnesses, 2 from Greek Catholic Church, 1 from Calvinist Church, 1 from Eastern Orthodox Church, 1 from Buddhism and 1 from Apostolic Church.

== Trivia ==
'Ostrov' is the Slovak word for island.
