= Krakovany, Piešťany District =

Krakovany
- Municipality
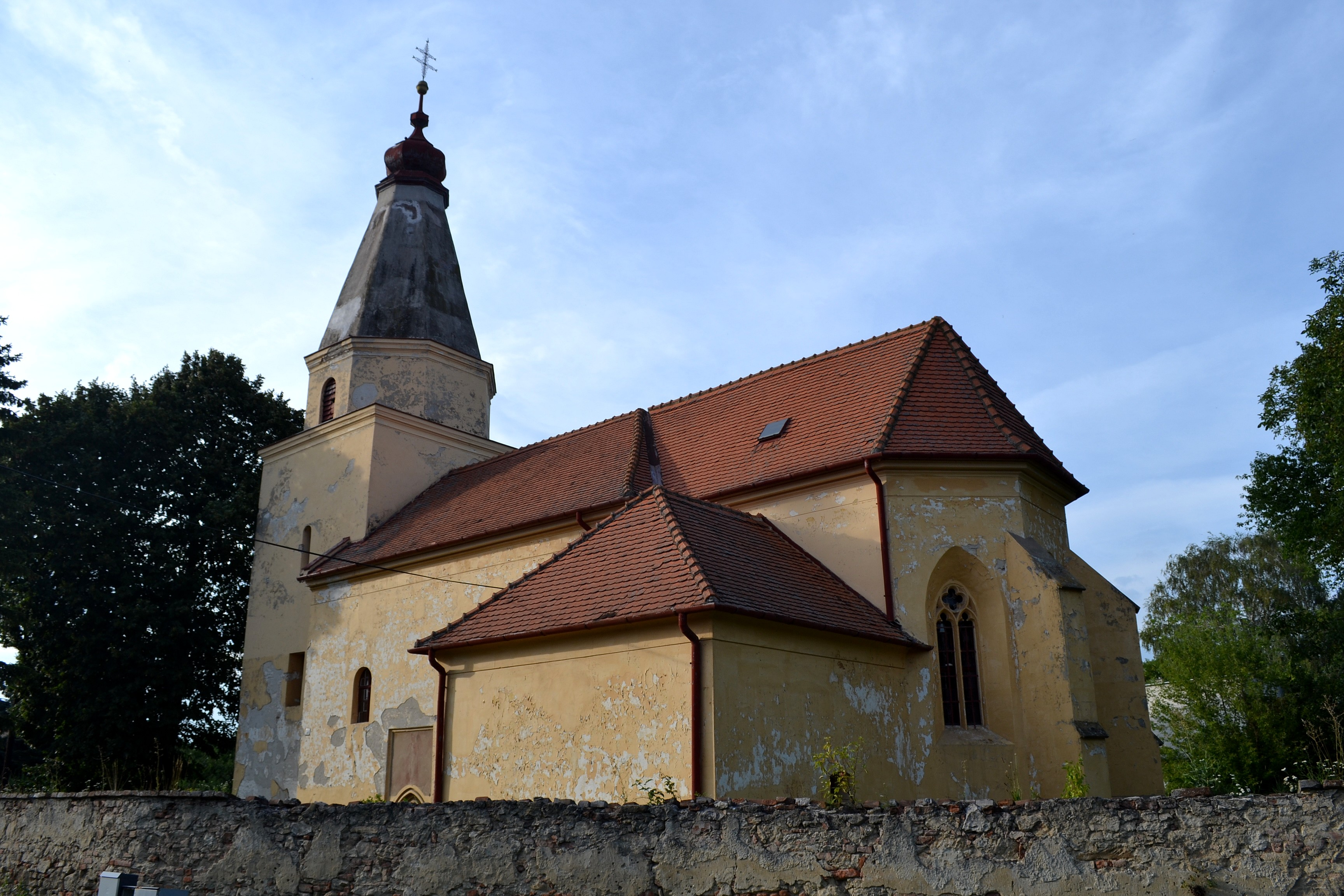
- Church in Krakovany

- Flag

- Location of Krakovany in the Trnava Region Location of Krakovany in Slovakia
- Coordinates: 48°37′N 17°46′E
- Country: Slovakia
- Region: Trnava Region
- District: Piešťany District
- First mentioned: 1113

Area
  - Total: 9.84 km^{2} (3.80 sq mi)
- Elevation: 163 m (535 ft)

Population (2025)
  - Total: 1,454
- Time zone: UTC+1 (CET)
  - Summer (DST): UTC+2 (CEST)
- Postal code: 922 02
- Area code: +421 33
- Vehicle registration plate (until 2022): PN
- Website: www.krakovany.sk

Krakovany is a village and municipality in Piešťany District in the Trnava Region of western Slovakia.

== History ==
In historical records the village was first mentioned in 1113.

== Geography ==
The municipality lies at an altitude of 163 metres (535 ft) and covers an area of 9.84 km^{2} (3.80 sq mi) (2025).

== Population ==
Population statistic (10 years)
Year	1995	2005	2015	2025
Count	1337	1354	1450	1454
Difference		+1.27%	+7.09%	+0.27%

Population statistic
Year	2024	2025
Count	1444	1454
Difference		+0.69%

It has a population of 1454 people (31 December 2025).

=== Ethnicity ===
Census 2021 (1+ %)
Ethnicity	Number	Fraction
Slovak	1421	96.86%
Not found out	47	3.2%
Total	1467	

In year 2021 was 1467 people by ethnicity 1421 as Slovak, 47 as Not found out, 11 as Czech, 2 as Canadian, 1 as Ukrainian, 1 as Rusyn, 1 as German and 1 as Other.

Note on population: The difference values of population numbers in the table "Population statistic" and in the sections "Ethnicity" & "Religion" is caused by the use of various statistical methods.

=== Religion ===
Census 2021 (1+ %)
Religion	Number	Fraction
Roman Catholic Church	1096	74.71%
None	252	17.18%
Not found out	62	4.23%
Evangelical Church	35	2.39%
Total	1467	

In year 2021 was 1467 people by religion 1096 from Roman Catholic Church, 252 from None, 62 from Not found out, 35 from Evangelical Church, 6 from Greek Catholic Church, 6 from Ad hoc movements, 3 from Other, 2 from Christian Congregations in Slovakia, 2 from Buddhism, 1 from Calvinist Church, 1 from Eastern Orthodox Church and 1 from Jehovah's Witnesses.
