= Banka, Piešťany District =

Banka
- Municipality
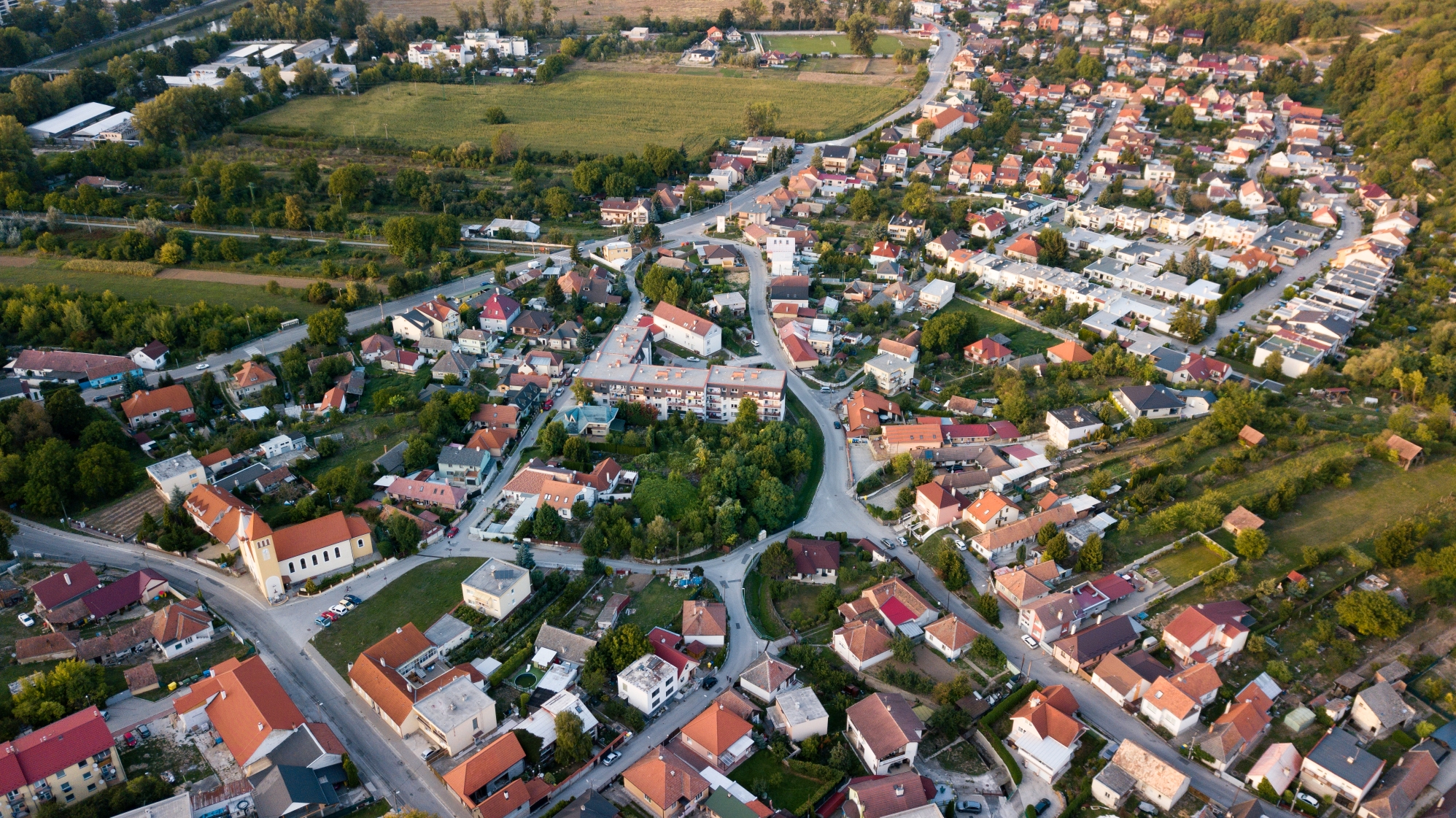

- Flag

- Location of Banka in the Trnava Region Location of Banka in Slovakia
- Coordinates: 48°35′00″N 17°51′00″E
- Country: Slovakia
- Region: Trnava Region
- District: Piešťany District
- First mentioned: 1241

Area
  - Total: 8.58 km^{2} (3.31 sq mi)
- Elevation: 177 m (581 ft)

Population (2025)
  - Total: 2,158
- Time zone: UTC+1 (CET)
  - Summer (DST): UTC+2 (CEST)
- Postal code: 921 01
- Area code: +421 33
- Vehicle registration plate (until 2022): PN
- Website: www.obecbanka.sk

Banka (Hungarian: Bánka) is a village and municipality in the Piešťany District in the Trnava Region of western Slovakia, near the Váh river.

== History ==
The site was inhabited for thousands of years, with the archaeological site dating inhabitation from the Paleolithic age. In historical records the village was first mentioned in 1241. From 1973 to 1996 it was part of the town of Piešťany.

== Geography ==
The municipality lies at an altitude of 177 metres (581 ft) and covers an area of 8.58 km^{2} (3.31 sq mi) (2025).

== Population ==
Population statistic (10 years)
Year	1995	2005	2015	2025
Count	1820	2166	2127	2158
Difference		+19.01%	−1.80%	+1.45%

Population statistic
Year	2024	2025
Count	2149	2158
Difference		+0.41%

It has a population of 2158 people (31 December 2025).

=== Ethnicity ===
Census 2021 (1+ %)
Ethnicity	Number	Fraction
Slovak	1978	91.65%
Not found out	124	5.74%
Czech	32	1.48%
Total	2158	

In year 2021 was 2158 people by ethnicity 1978 as Slovak, 124 as Not found out, 32 as Czech, 11 as Hungarian, 9 as Jewish, 9 as Other, 7 as Vietnamese, 5 as Romani, 4 as Ukrainian, 4 as Russian, 3 as German, 2 as Turkish, 1 as Irish, 1 as Italian, 1 as Rusyn, 1 as Moravian, 1 as Bulgarian and 1 as English.

Note on population: The difference values of population numbers in the table "Population statistic" and in the sections "Ethnicity" & "Religion" is caused by the use of various statistical methods.

=== Religion ===
Census 2021 (1+ %)
Religion	Number	Fraction
Roman Catholic Church	1209	56.02%
None	667	30.91%
Not found out	124	5.75%
Evangelical Church	55	2.55%
Total	2158	

In year 2021 was 2158 people by religion 1209 from Roman Catholic Church, 667 from None, 124 from Not found out, 55 from Evangelical Church, 14 from Jehovah's Witnesses, 14 from Ad hoc movements, 13 from Other, 12 from Greek Catholic Church, 10 from Jewish community, 10 from Buddhism, 6 from Eastern Orthodox Church, 6 from Christian Congregations in Slovakia, 6 from Islam, 5 from Other and not ascertained christian church, 3 from United Methodist Church, 2 from Apostolic Church, 1 from Paganism and natural spirituality and 1 from Hinduism.

== Genealogical resources ==
The records for genealogical research are available at the state archive in Bratislava (Slovak: Štátny archív v Bratislave)

- Roman Catholic church records (births/marriages/deaths): 1783-1905 (parish B)

== See also ==
- List of municipalities and towns in Slovakia
