= Prašník =

- Municipality
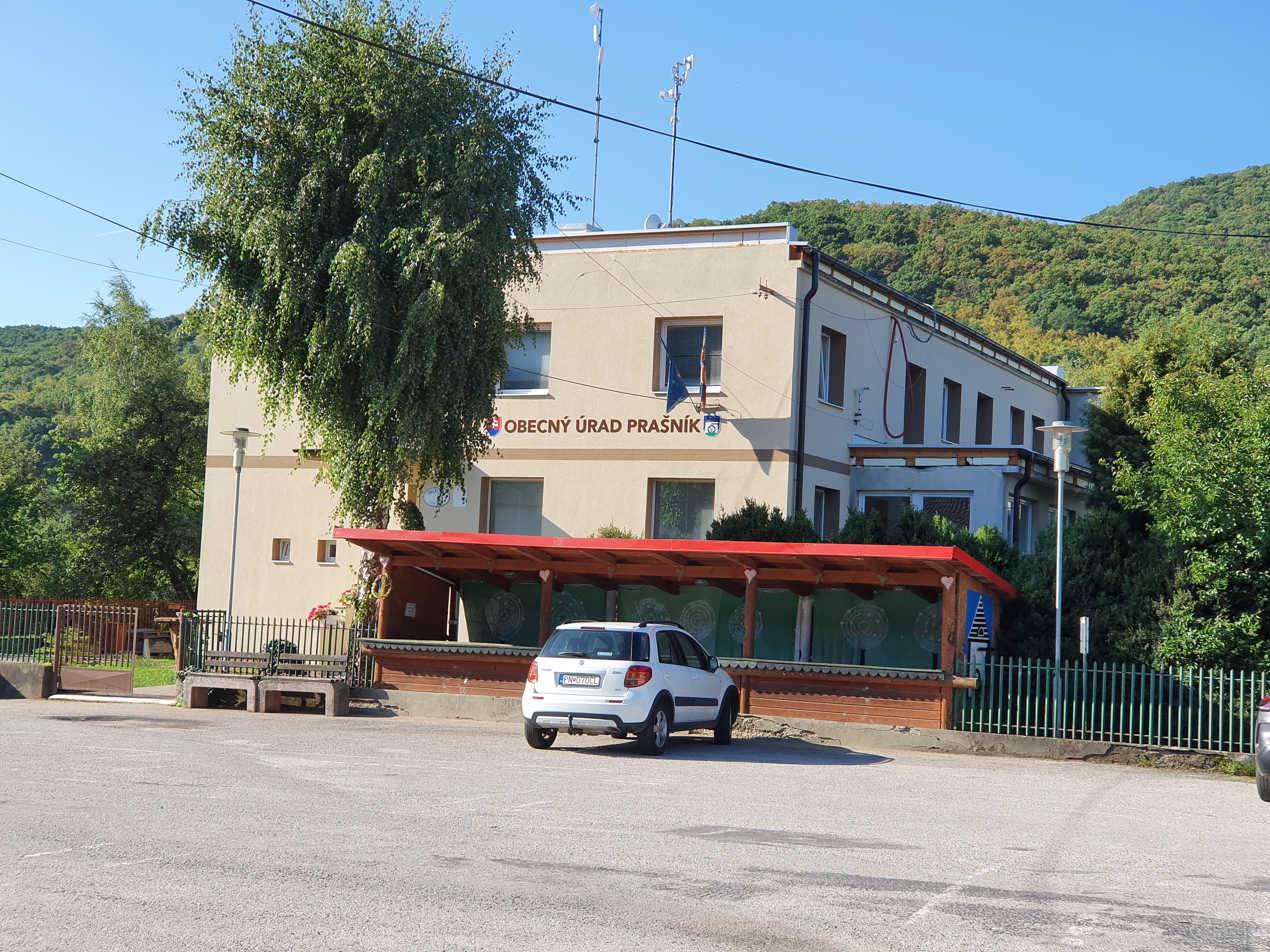

- Flag

- Location of Prašník in the Trnava Region Location of Prašník in Slovakia
- Coordinates: 48.65°N 17.69°E
- Country: Slovakia
- Region: Trnava Region
- District: Piešťany District
- First mentioned: 1958

Area
  - Total: 27.88 km^{2} (10.76 sq mi)
- Elevation: 226 m (741 ft)

Population (2025)
  - Total: 817
- Time zone: UTC+1 (CET)
  - Summer (DST): UTC+2 (CEST)
- Postal code: 922 11
- Area code: +421 33
- Vehicle registration plate (until 2022): PN
- Website: www.prasnik.sk

Prašník (Hungarian: Prasnikirtvány) is a village and municipality in Piešťany District in the Trnava Region of western Slovakia.

== History ==
In historical records, the village was first mentioned in 1958.

== Geography ==
The municipality lies at an altitude of 226 metres (741 ft) and covers an area of 27.88 km^{2} (10.76 sq mi) (2025). The village of Pusta Ves pertains to the municipality of Prašník.

== Population ==
Population statistic (10 years)
Year	1995	2005	2015	2025
Count	888	845	845	817
Difference		−4.84%	+1.42%	−3.31%

Population statistic
Year	2024	2025
Count	823	817
Difference		−0.72%

It has a population of 817 people (31 December 2025).

=== Ethnicity ===
Census 2021 (1+ %)
Ethnicity	Number	Fraction
Slovak	777	95.68%
Not found out	23	2.83%
Romani	9	1.1%
Total	812	

In year 2021 was 812 people by ethnicity 777 as Slovak, 23 as Not found out, 9 as Romani, 4 as Czech, 4 as Hungarian, 2 as Russian, 1 as Ukrainian, 1 as Other and 1 as French.

Note on population: The difference values of population numbers in the table "Population statistic" and in the sections "Ethnicity" & "Religion" is caused by the use of various statistical methods.

=== Religion ===
Census 2021 (1+ %)
Religion	Number	Fraction
Evangelical Church	340	41.87%
None	308	37.93%
Roman Catholic Church	126	15.52%
Not found out	24	2.96%
Total	812	

In year 2021 was 812 people by religion 340 from Evangelical Church, 308 from None, 126 from Roman Catholic Church, 24 from Not found out, 3 from Paganism and natural spirituality, 2 from Jehovah's Witnesses, 2 from Greek Catholic Church, 2 from Ad hoc movements, 1 from Eastern Orthodox Church, 1 from Christian Congregations in Slovakia, 1 from Other, 1 from United Methodist Church and 1 from Buddhism.
