= Veľké Kostoľany =

- Municipality
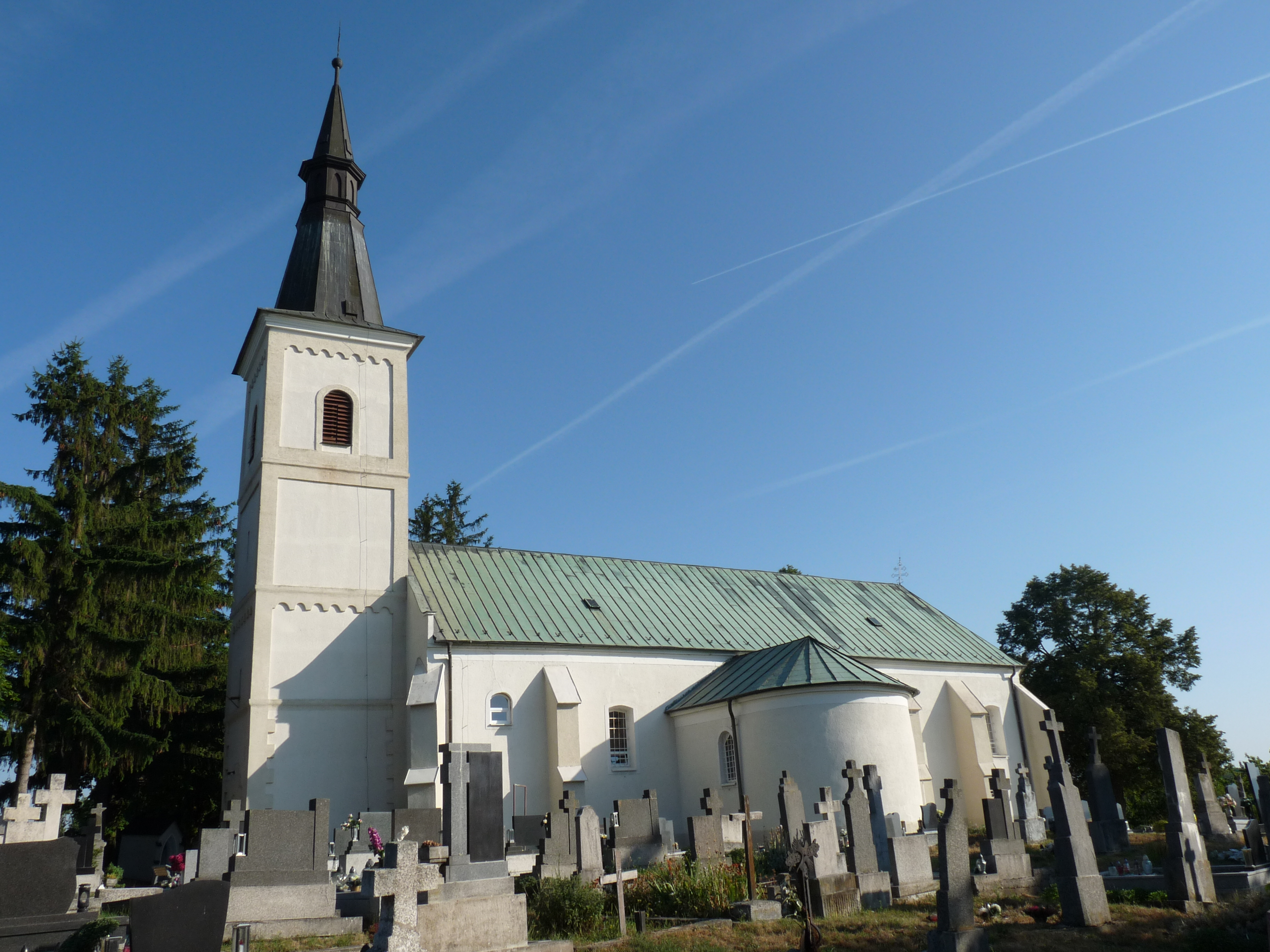
- Church of Saint Vitus

- Flag

- Location of Veľké Kostoľany in the Trnava Region Location of Veľké Kostoľany in Slovakia
- Coordinates: 48.50°N 17.73°E
- Country: Slovakia
- Region: Trnava Region
- District: Piešťany District
- First mentioned: 1209

Area
  - Total: 24.45 km^{2} (9.44 sq mi)
- Elevation: 153 m (502 ft)

Population (2025)
  - Total: 2,847
- Time zone: UTC+1 (CET)
  - Summer (DST): UTC+2 (CEST)
- Postal code: 922 07
- Area code: +421 33
- Vehicle registration plate (until 2022): PN
- Website: www.velkekostolany.sk

Veľké Kostoľany (Hungarian: Nagykosztolány) is a village and municipality in Piešťany District in the Trnava Region of western Slovakia.

== History ==
In historical records the village was first mentioned in 1209.

== Geography ==
The municipality lies at an altitude of 153 metres (502 ft) and covers an area of 24.45 km^{2} (9.44 sq mi) (2025).

== Population ==
Population statistic (10 years)
Year	1995	2005	2015	2025
Count	2486	2681	2761	2847
Difference		+7.84%	+2.98%	+3.11%

Population statistic
Year	2024	2025
Count	2829	2847
Difference		+0.63%

It has a population of 2847 people (31 December 2025).

=== Ethnicity ===
Census 2021 (1+ %)
Ethnicity	Number	Fraction
Slovak	2597	92.81%
Not found out	190	6.79%
Total	2798	

In year 2021 was 2798 people by ethnicity 2597 as Slovak, 190 as Not found out, 14 as Czech, 11 as Other, 8 as Russian, 7 as Hungarian, 4 as Serbian, 3 as Romani, 2 as Rusyn, 1 as Jewish, 1 as Ukrainian, 1 as French and 1 as English.

Note on population: The difference values of population numbers in the table "Population statistic" and in the sections "Ethnicity" & "Religion" is caused by the use of various statistical methods.

=== Religion ===
Census 2021 (1+ %)
Religion	Number	Fraction
Roman Catholic Church	2155	77.02%
None	366	13.08%
Not found out	188	6.72%
Evangelical Church	33	1.18%
Total	2798	

In year 2021 was 2798 people by religion 2155 from Roman Catholic Church, 366 from None, 188 from Not found out, 33 from Evangelical Church, 11 from Other, 11 from Ad hoc movements, 10 from Greek Catholic Church, 5 from Church of Jesus Christ of Latter-day Saints, 3 from Christian Congregations in Slovakia, 3 from Buddhism, 2 from Jewish community, 2 from Calvinist Church, 2 from Eastern Orthodox Church, 2 from Islam, 2 from United Methodist Church, 1 from Other and not ascertained christian church, 1 from Jehovah's Witnesses and 1 from Hinduism.

== Points of interest ==
- Veľké Kostoľany transmitter
