= Pečeňady =

- Municipality
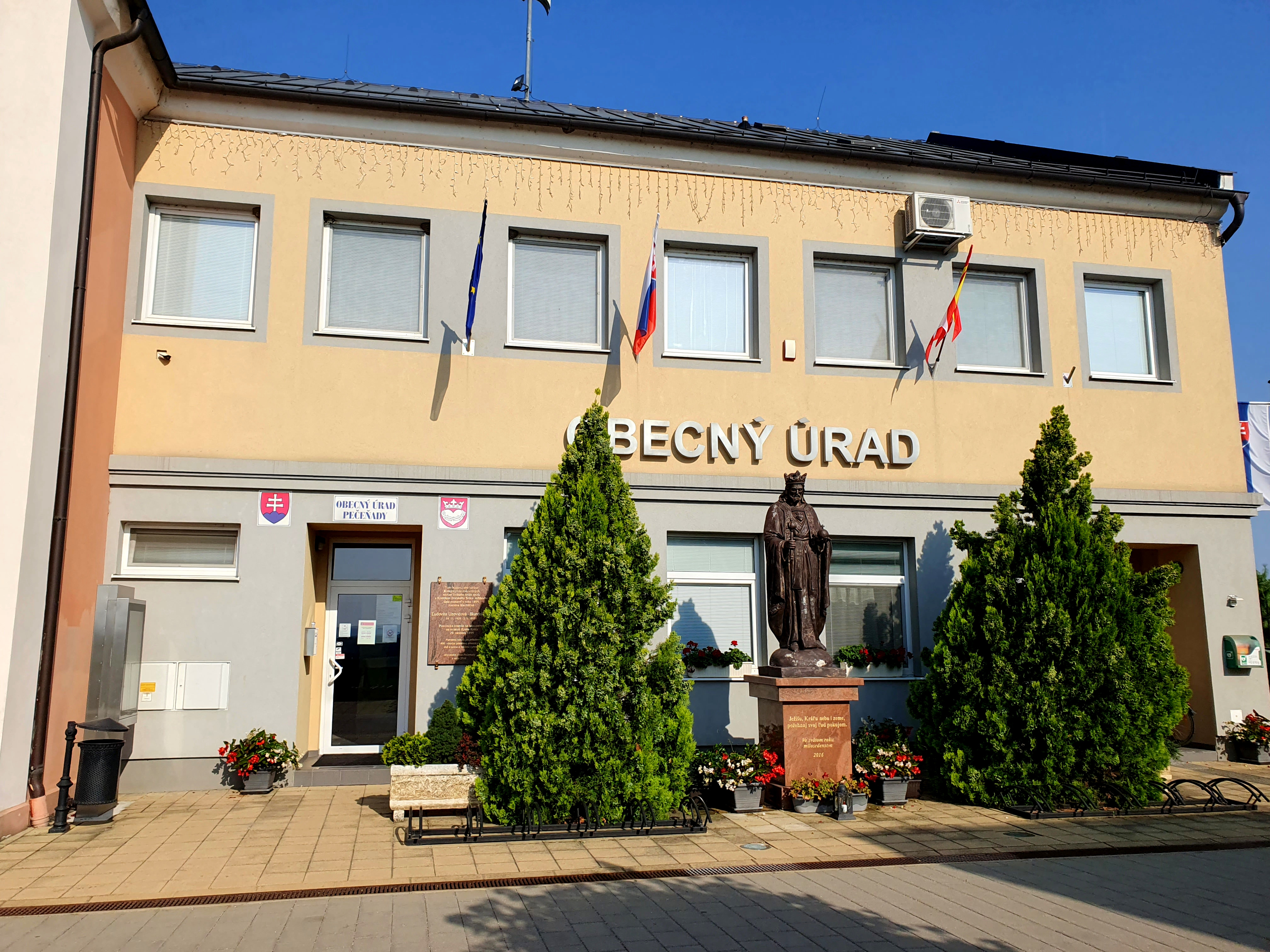

- Flag

- Location of Pečeňady in the Trnava Region Location of Pečeňady in Slovakia
- Coordinates: 48.48°N 17.72°E
- Country: Slovakia
- Region: Trnava Region
- District: Piešťany District
- First mentioned: 1113

Area
  - Total: 8.57 km^{2} (3.31 sq mi)
- Elevation: 154 m (505 ft)

Population (2025)
  - Total: 569
- Time zone: UTC+1 (CET)
  - Summer (DST): UTC+2 (CEST)
- Postal code: 922 07
- Area code: +421 33
- Vehicle registration plate (until 2022): PN
- Website: www.pecenady.sk

Pečeňady (Hungarian: Besenyőpetőfalva, until 1899 Petőfalu) is a village and municipality in Piešťany District in the Trnava Region of western Slovakia.

== History ==
In historical records the village was first mentioned in 1113.

== Geography ==
The municipality lies at an altitude of 154 metres (505 ft) and covers an area of 8.57 km^{2} (3.31 sq mi) (2025).

== Population ==
Population statistic (10 years)
Year	1995	2005	2015	2025
Count	526	478	541	569
Difference		−9.12%	+13.17%	+5.17%

Population statistic
Year	2024	2025
Count	564	569
Difference		+0.88%

It has a population of 569 people (31 December 2025).

=== Ethnicity ===
Census 2021 (1+ %)
Ethnicity	Number	Fraction
Slovak	548	96.99%
Not found out	16	2.83%
Total	565	

In year 2021 was 565 people by ethnicity 548 as Slovak, 16 as Not found out, 3 as Polish, 2 as Other, 1 as Jewish, 1 as Irish, 1 as Russian and 1 as French.

Note on population: The difference values of population numbers in the table "Population statistic" and in the sections "Ethnicity" & "Religion" is caused by the use of various statistical methods.

=== Religion ===
Census 2021 (1+ %)
Religion	Number	Fraction
Roman Catholic Church	471	83.36%
None	67	11.86%
Not found out	17	3.01%
Total	565	

In year 2021 was 565 people by religion 471 from Roman Catholic Church, 67 from None, 17 from Not found out, 4 from Other, 3 from Evangelical Church, 1 from Jewish community, 1 from Greek Catholic Church and 1 from Ad hoc movements.

== Famous people ==
- Anton Kolarovič (*1894 – † 1977), SDB, Roman Catholic priest end religious prisoner (sentenced to 5 years in prison).
