= Šípkové =

- Municipality
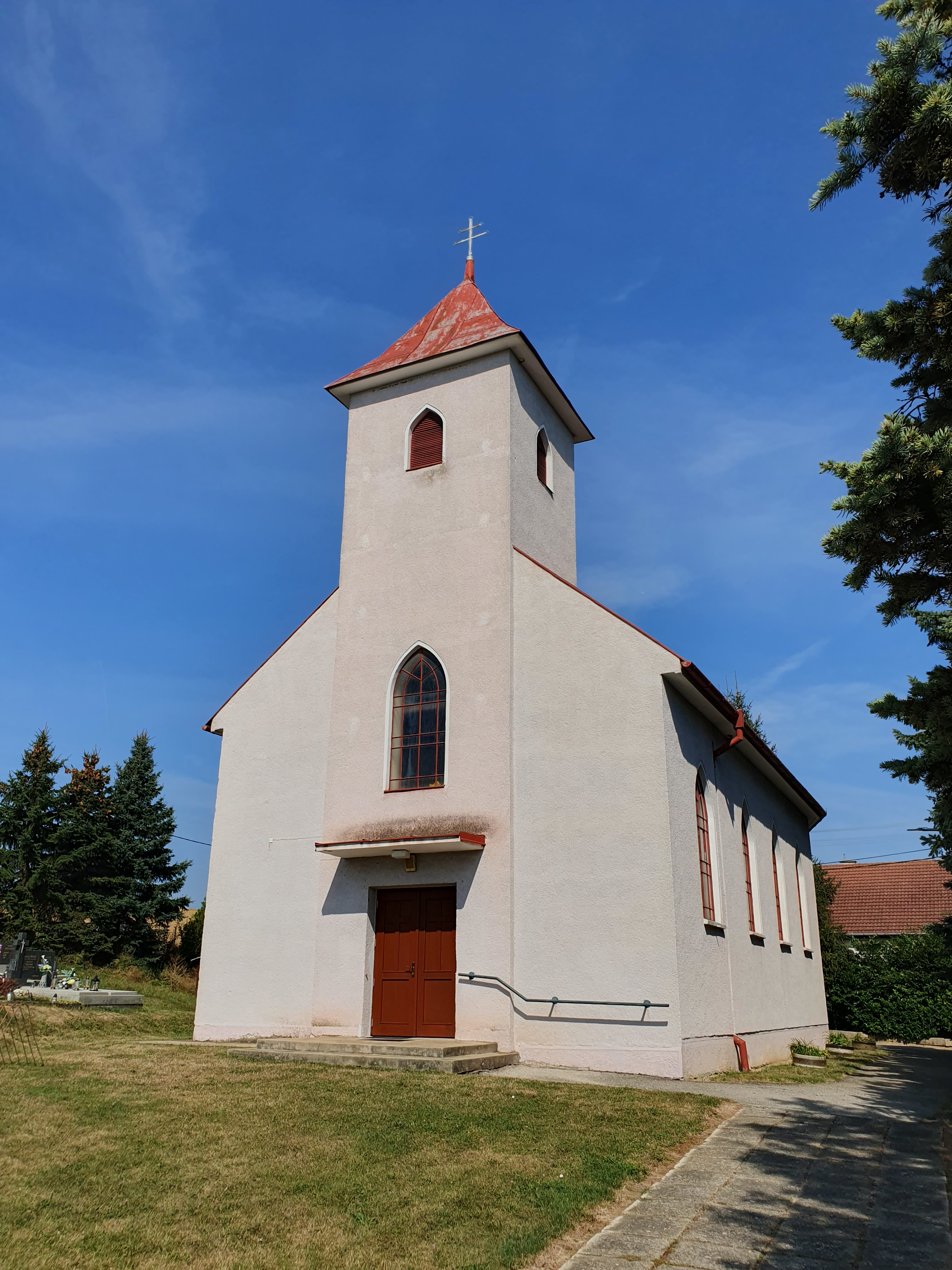

- Flag

- Location of Šípkové in the Trnava Region Location of Šípkové in Slovakia
- Coordinates: 48.67°N 17.72°E
- Country: Slovakia
- Region: Trnava Region
- District: Piešťany District
- First mentioned: 1369

Area
  - Total: 8.30 km^{2} (3.20 sq mi)
- Elevation: 217 m (712 ft)

Population (2025)
  - Total: 299
- Time zone: UTC+1 (CET)
  - Summer (DST): UTC+2 (CEST)
- Postal code: 922 03
- Area code: +421 33
- Vehicle registration plate (until 2022): PN
- Website: www.sipkove.sk

Šípkové (Hungarian: Csipkés) is a village and municipality in Piešťany District in the Trnava Region of western Slovakia.

== History ==
In historical records the village was first mentioned in 1269.

== Geography ==
The municipality lies at an altitude of 217 metres (712 ft) and covers an area of 8.30 km^{2} (3.20 sq mi) (2025).

== Population ==
Population statistic (10 years)
Year	1995	2005	2015	2025
Count	418	334	306	299
Difference		−20.09%	−8.38%	−2.28%

Population statistic
Year	2024	2025
Count	303	299
Difference		−1.32%

It has a population of 299 people (31 December 2025).

=== Ethnicity ===
Census 2021 (1+ %)
Ethnicity	Number	Fraction
Slovak	296	98.66%
Czech	6	2%
Not found out	3	1%
Total	300	

In year 2021 was 300 people by ethnicity 296 as Slovak, 6 as Czech, 3 as Not found out, 1 as Jewish, 1 as Vietnamese and 1 as Austrian.

Note on population: The difference values of population numbers in the table "Population statistic" and in the sections "Ethnicity" & "Religion" is caused by the use of various statistical methods.

=== Religion ===
Census 2021 (1+ %)
Religion	Number	Fraction
Roman Catholic Church	214	71.33%
None	56	18.67%
Evangelical Church	17	5.67%
Jehovah's Witnesses	4	1.33%
Ad hoc movements	3	1%
Total	300	

In year 2021 was 300 people by religion 214 from Roman Catholic Church, 56 from None, 17 from Evangelical Church, 4 from Jehovah's Witnesses, 3 from Ad hoc movements, 2 from Other, 1 from Jewish community, 1 from Eastern Orthodox Church, 1 from Paganism and natural spirituality and 1 from Seventh-day Adventist Church.
