= Trebatice =

- Municipality
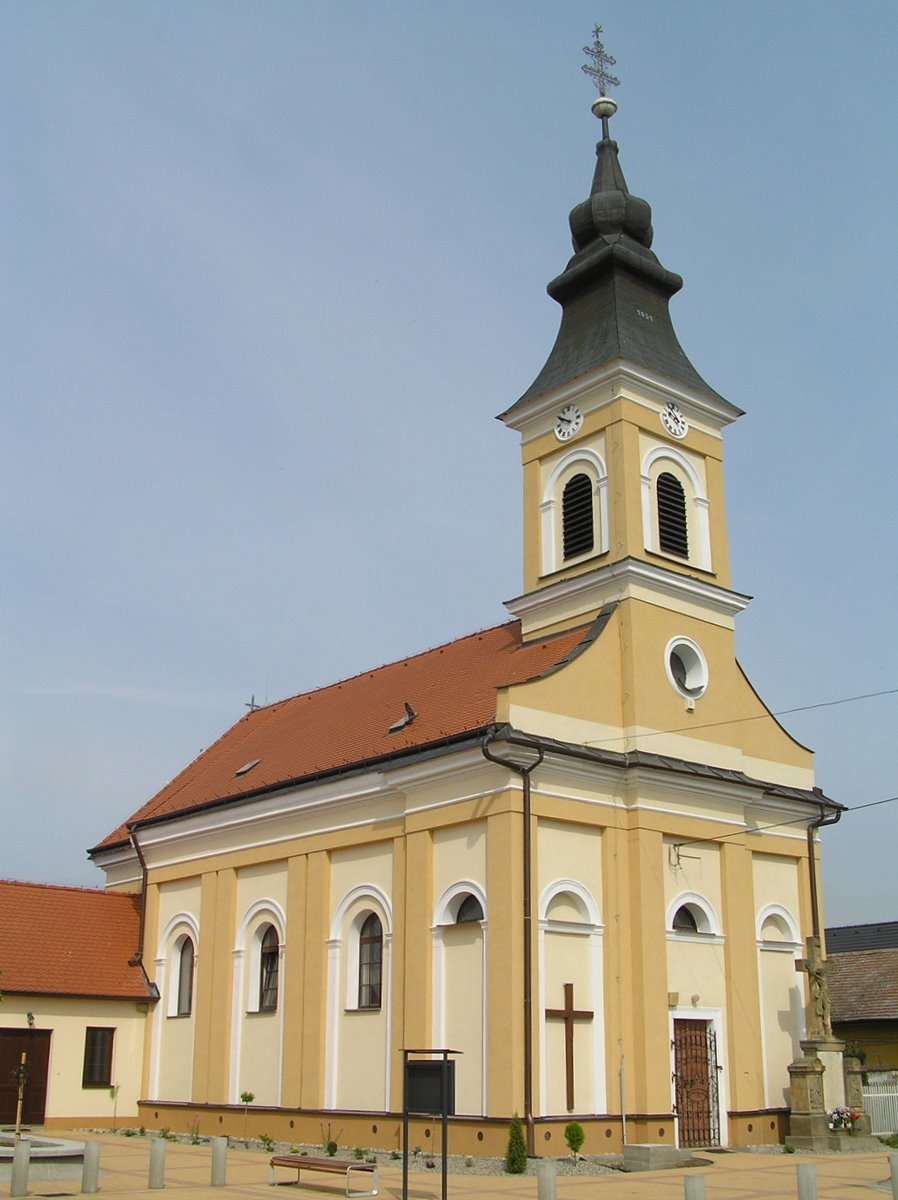
- Church in Trebatice

- Flag

- Location of Trebatice in the Trnava Region Location of Trebatice in Slovakia
- Coordinates: 48.60°N 17.75°E
- Country: Slovakia
- Region: Trnava Region
- District: Piešťany District
- First mentioned: 1113

Area
  - Total: 7.66 km^{2} (2.96 sq mi)
- Elevation: 165 m (541 ft)

Population (2025)
  - Total: 1,331
- Time zone: UTC+1 (CET)
  - Summer (DST): UTC+2 (CEST)
- Postal code: 922 10
- Area code: +421 33
- Vehicle registration plate (until 2022): PN
- Website: www.trebatice.sk

Trebatice (Hungarian: Vágterbete) is a village and municipality in Piešťany District in the Trnava Region of western Slovakia.

== History ==
In historical records the village was first mentioned in 1113.

== Geography ==
The municipality lies at an altitude of 165 metres (541 ft) and covers an area of 7.66 km^{2} (2.96 sq mi) (2025).

== Population ==
Population statistic (10 years)
Year	1995	2005	2015	2025
Count	1220	1211	1349	1331
Difference		−0.73%	+11.39%	−1.33%

Population statistic
Year	2024	2025
Count	1352	1331
Difference		−1.55%

It has a population of 1331 people (31 December 2025).

=== Ethnicity ===
Census 2021 (1+ %)
Ethnicity	Number	Fraction
Slovak	1283	95.74%
Not found out	44	3.28%
Total	1340	

In year 2021 was 1340 people by ethnicity 1283 as Slovak, 44 as Not found out, 5 as Czech, 5 as Vietnamese, 2 as Russian, 2 as Other, 1 as Jewish, 1 as Silesian, 1 as Romani, 1 as German, 1 as Hungarian and 1 as Greek.

Note on population: The difference values of population numbers in the table "Population statistic" and in the sections "Ethnicity" & "Religion" is caused by the use of various statistical methods.

=== Religion ===
Census 2021 (1+ %)
Religion	Number	Fraction
Roman Catholic Church	1021	76.19%
None	219	16.34%
Not found out	44	3.28%
Evangelical Church	33	2.46%
Total	1340	

In year 2021 was 1340 people by religion 1021 from Roman Catholic Church, 219 from None, 44 from Not found out, 33 from Evangelical Church, 6 from Other, 5 from Ad hoc movements, 4 from Eastern Orthodox Church, 3 from Christian Congregations in Slovakia, 1 from Old Catholic Church, 1 from Jehovah's Witnesses, 1 from Hinduism, 1 from Greek Catholic Church and 1 from Buddhism.
