= Bašovce =

- Municipality
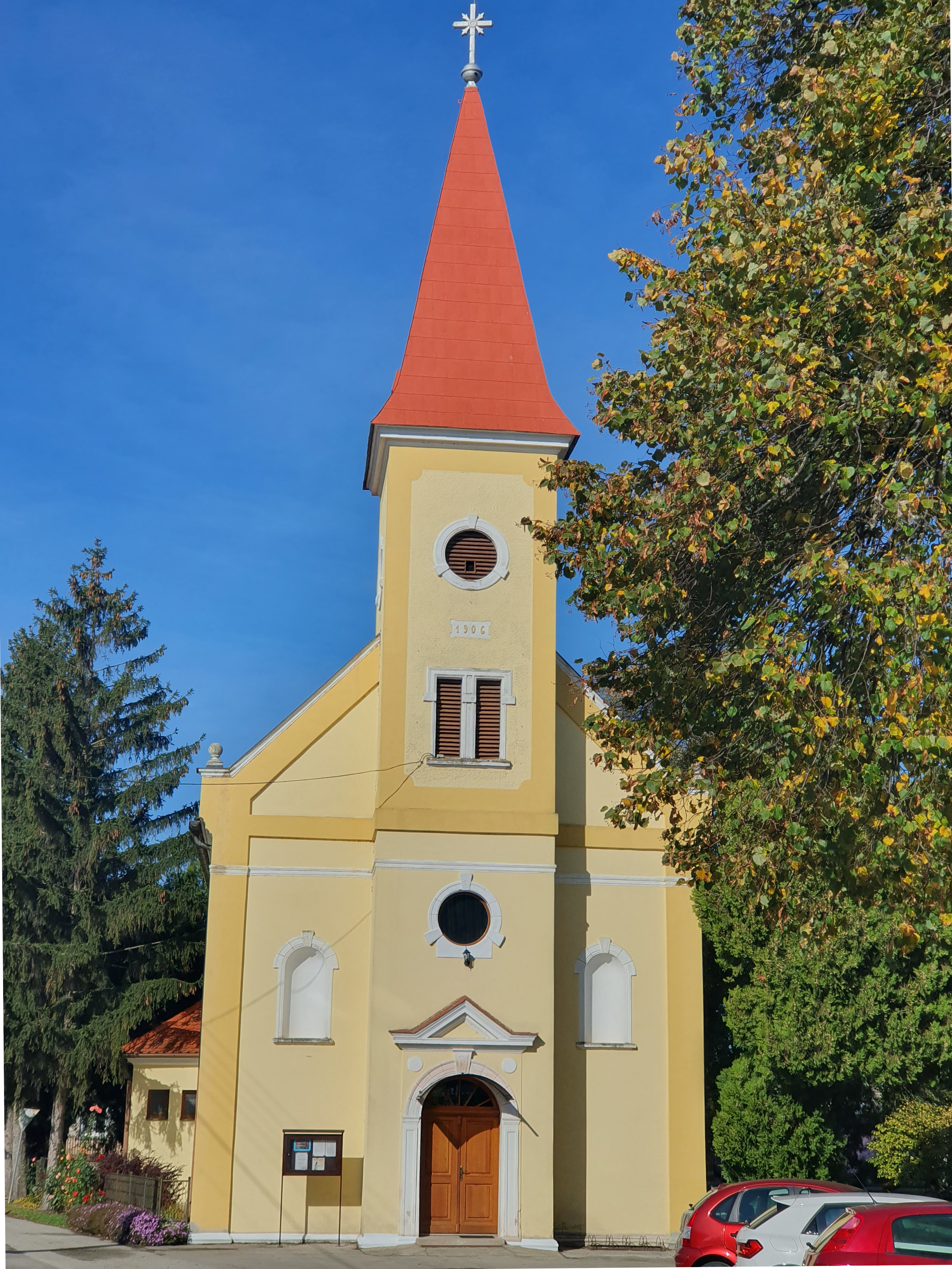

- Flag

- Location of Bašovce in the Trnava Region Location of Bašovce in Slovakia
- Coordinates: 48.63°N 17.80°E
- Country: Slovakia
- Region: Trnava Region
- District: Piešťany District
- First mentioned: 1113

Government
  - Mayor: Ľubomír Dekan

Area
  - Total: 4.04 km^{2} (1.56 sq mi)
- Elevation: 165 m (541 ft)

Population (2025)
  - Total: 334
- Time zone: UTC+1 (CET)
  - Summer (DST): UTC+2 (CEST)
- Postal code: 922 01
- Area code: +421 33
- Vehicle registration plate (until 2022): PN
- Website: basovce.sk

Bašovce (Hungarian: Bassóc) is a village and municipality in the Piešťany District in the Trnava Region of western Slovakia.

== History ==
In historical records the village was first mentioned in 1113.

== Geography ==
The municipality lies at an altitude of 165 metres (541 ft) and covers an area of 4.04 km^{2} (1.56 sq mi) (2025).

== Population ==
Population statistic (10 years)
Year	1995	2005	2015	2025
Count	360	349	345	334
Difference		−3.05%	−1.14%	−3.18%

Population statistic
Year	2024	2025
Count	336	334
Difference		−0.59%

It has a population of 334 people (31 December 2025).

=== Ethnicity ===
Census 2021 (1+ %)
Ethnicity	Number	Fraction
Slovak	333	97.94%
Not found out	7	2.05%
Total	340	

In year 2021 was 340 people by ethnicity 333 as Slovak, 7 as Not found out, 2 as Czech, 1 as Romani and 1 as Bulgarian.

Note on population: The difference values of population numbers in the table "Population statistic" and in the sections "Ethnicity" & "Religion" is caused by the use of various statistical methods.

=== Religion ===
Census 2021 (1+ %)
Religion	Number	Fraction
Roman Catholic Church	295	86.76%
None	27	7.94%
Not found out	9	2.65%
Jehovah's Witnesses	4	1.18%
Total	340	

In year 2021 was 340 people by religion 295 from Roman Catholic Church, 27 from None, 9 from Not found out, 4 from Jehovah's Witnesses, 2 from Christian Congregations in Slovakia, 2 from Evangelical Church and 1 from Ad hoc movements.

== Genealogical resources ==
The records for genealogical research are available at the state archive in Bratislava (Slovak: Štátny archív v Bratislave).

- Roman Catholic church records (births/marriages/deaths): 1765-1949 (parish B)
