= Drahovce =

- Municipality
- Flag Coat of arms

- Location of Drahovce in the Trnava Region Location of Drahovce in Slovakia
- Coordinates: 48.52°N 17.80°E
- Country: Slovakia
- Region: Trnava Region
- District: Piešťany District
- First mentioned: 1309

Area
  - Total: 24.04 km^{2} (9.28 sq mi)
- Elevation: 150 m (490 ft)

Population (2025)
  - Total: 2,585
- Time zone: UTC+1 (CET)
  - Summer (DST): UTC+2 (CEST)
- Postal code: 922 41
- Area code: +421 33
- Vehicle registration plate (until 2022): PN
- Website: obecdrahovce.sk

Drahovce (Hungarian: Vágdebrőd) is a village and municipality in Piešťany District in the Trnava Region of western Slovakia.

== History ==
In historical records the village was first mentioned in 1309.

== Geography ==
The municipality lies at an altitude of 150 metres (490 ft) and covers an area of 24.04 km^{2} (9.28 sq mi) (2025).

== Population ==
Population statistic (10 years)
| Year | 1995 | 2005 | 2015 | 2025 |
|---|---|---|---|---|
| Count | 2471 | 2562 | 2543 | 2585 |
| Difference | | +3.68% | −0.74% | +1.65% |

Population statistic
| Year | 2024 | 2025 |
|---|---|---|
| Count | 2592 | 2585 |
| Difference | | −0.27% |

It has a population of 2585 people (31 December 2025).

=== Ethnicity ===
Census 2021 (1+ %)
| Ethnicity | Number | Fraction |
|---|---|---|
| Slovak | 2395 | 92.39% |
| Not found out | 190 | 7.33% |
| Romani | 32 | 1.23% |
| Total | 2592 | |

In year 2021 was 2592 people by ethnicity 2395 as Slovak, 190 as Not found out, 32 as Romani, 16 as Czech, 9 as Other, 6 as Ukrainian, 6 as Russian, 6 as Hungarian, 2 as Italian, 2 as Rusyn, 2 as Croatian, 1 as Turkish, 1 as Polish, 1 as German, 1 as Moravian and 1 as French.

Note on population: The difference values of population numbers in the table "Population statistic" and in the sections "Ethnicity" & "Religion" is caused by the use of various statistical methods.

=== Religion ===
Census 2021 (1+ %)
| Religion | Number | Fraction |
|---|---|---|
| Roman Catholic Church | 1930 | 74.46% |
| None | 386 | 14.89% |
| Not found out | 175 | 6.75% |
| Evangelical Church | 32 | 1.23% |
| Total | 2592 | |

In year 2021 was 2592 people by religion 1930 from Roman Catholic Church, 386 from None, 175 from Not found out, 32 from Evangelical Church, 13 from Other, 12 from Ad hoc movements, 11 from Eastern Orthodox Church, 8 from Christian Congregations in Slovakia, 6 from Greek Catholic Church, 5 from Islam, 5 from Apostolic Church, 2 from Paganism and natural spirituality, 2 from Seventh-day Adventist Church, 1 from Old Catholic Church, 1 from Jehovah's Witnesses, 1 from Hinduism, 1 from United Methodist Church and 1 from Church of the Brethren.

== Genealogical resources ==
The records for genealogical research are available at the state archive "Statny Archiv in Bratislava, Slovakia"

- Roman Catholic church records (births/marriages/deaths): 1787-1907 (parish A)

== See also ==
- List of municipalities and towns in Slovakia
