= Sokolovce =

- Municipality
- Flag

- Location of Sokolovce in the Trnava Region Location of Sokolovce in Slovakia
- Coordinates: 48.53°N 17.85°E
- Country: Slovakia
- Region: Trnava Region
- District: Piešťany District
- First mentioned: 1293

Area
  - Total: 6.57 km^{2} (2.54 sq mi)
- Elevation: 154 m (505 ft)

Population (2025)
  - Total: 1,430
- Time zone: UTC+1 (CET)
  - Summer (DST): UTC+2 (CEST)
- Postal code: 922 31
- Area code: +421 33
- Vehicle registration plate (until 2022): PN
- Website: sokolovce.sk

Sokolovce (Hungarian: Vágszakaly) is a village and municipality in Piešťany District in the Trnava Region of western Slovakia.

== History ==
In historical records the village was first mentioned in 1293.

Sokolovce have a very rich history. In the past, they were the settlement of royal falconers. You will find here an old manor house dating back to 1705, as well as a baroque church dating from 1770. As part of the manor house there were built the wine cellars, which were the storage for the wine of the nobility of Austro-Hungarian monarchy, of descendants of the Thurz family. Since the microclimates of this wine cellar provide ideal conditions for ripening and storage of archive wines, after 1805 the estate passed into property gradually with several noblemen with business activities, who managed the wine business here until the 40s of the 20th century. Today, the cellar is used as a private wine cellar with a capacity of approximately 10,500 bottles. The capacity of the cellar can be increased to approximately three times, to approximately 31,500 bottles.

== Geography ==
The municipality lies at an altitude of 154 metres (505 ft) and covers an area of 6.57 km^{2} (2.54 sq mi) (2025).

== Population ==
Population statistic (10 years)
Year	1995	2005	2015	2025
Count	1127	1183	1288	1430
Difference		+4.96%	+8.87%	+11.02%

Population statistic
Year	2024	2025
Count	1401	1430
Difference		+2.06%

It has a population of 1430 people (31 December 2025).

=== Ethnicity ===
Census 2021 (1+ %)
Ethnicity	Number	Fraction
Slovak	1311	95.83%
Not found out	48	3.5%
Czech	16	1.16%
Total	1368	

In year 2021 was 1368 people by ethnicity 1311 as Slovak, 48 as Not found out, 16 as Czech, 7 as Other, 6 as Russian, 5 as Polish, 3 as Hungarian, 2 as Romani, 2 as German and 2 as Canadian.

Note on population: The difference values of population numbers in the table "Population statistic" and in the sections "Ethnicity" & "Religion" is caused by the use of various statistical methods.

=== Religion ===
Census 2021 (1+ %)
Religion	Number	Fraction
Roman Catholic Church	868	63.45%
None	369	26.97%
Not found out	49	3.58%
Evangelical Church	31	2.27%
Total	1368	

In year 2021 was 1368 people by religion 868 from Roman Catholic Church, 369 from None, 49 from Not found out, 31 from Evangelical Church, 12 from Jehovah's Witnesses, 11 from Christian Congregations in Slovakia, 6 from Greek Catholic Church, 5 from Other, 4 from Calvinist Church, 4 from Eastern Orthodox Church, 4 from Ad hoc movements, 3 from Paganism and natural spirituality, 1 from Old Catholic Church and 1 from Other and not ascertained christian church.
