= Ratnovce =

Municipality in Trnava Region, Slovakia

- Municipality
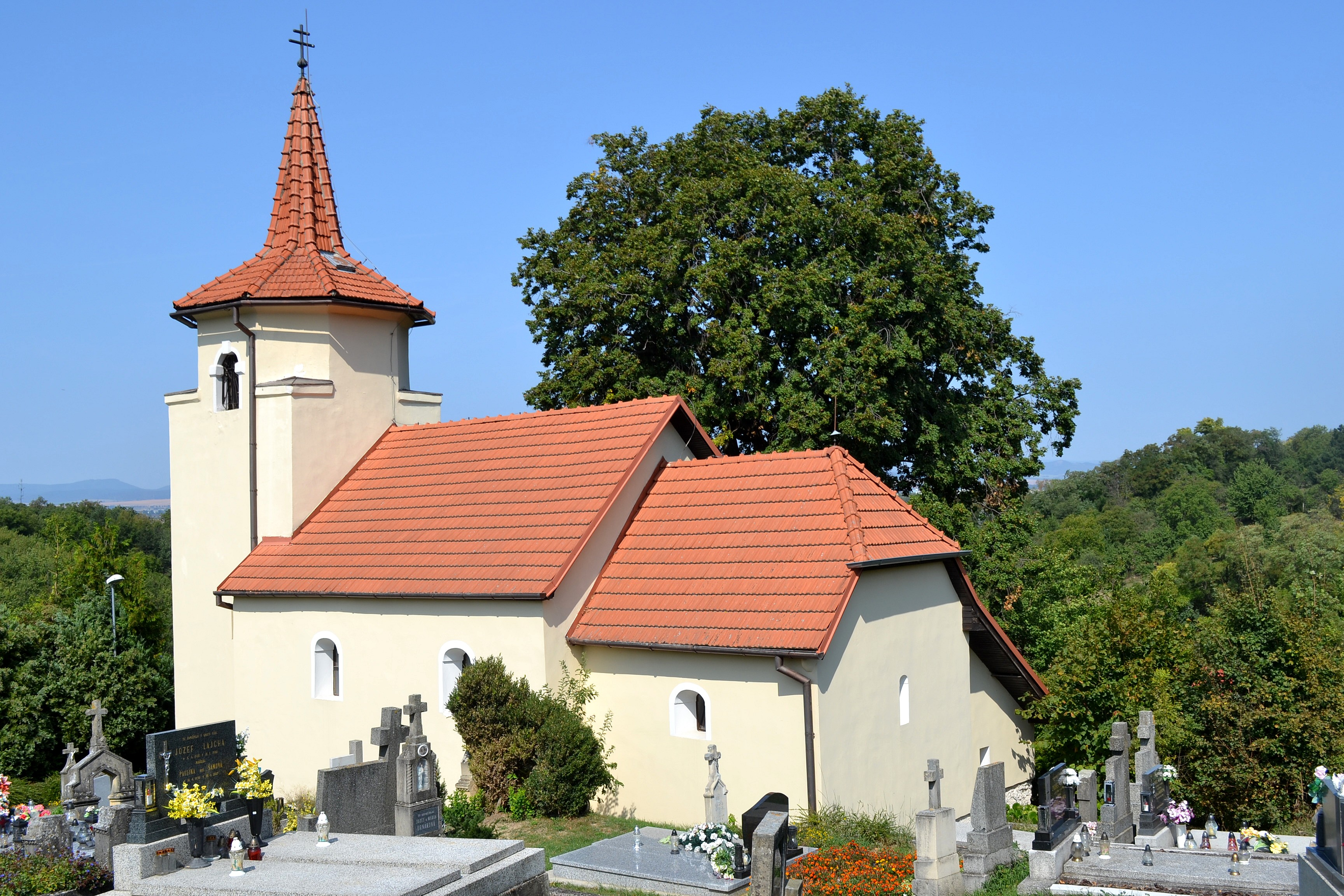
- Church in Ratnovce

- Flag

- Location of Ratnovce in the Trnava Region Location of Ratnovce in Slovakia
- Coordinates: 48.57°N 17.85°E
- Country: Slovakia
- Region: Trnava Region
- District: Piešťany District
- First mentioned: 1240

Area
  - Total: 8.43 km^{2} (3.25 sq mi)
- Elevation: 156 m (512 ft)

Population (2025)
  - Total: 1,067
- Time zone: UTC+1 (CET)
  - Summer (DST): UTC+2 (CEST)
- Postal code: 922 31
- Area code: +421 33
- Vehicle registration plate (until 2022): PN
- Website: www.ratnovce.sk

Ratnovce (Hungarian: Ratnóc) is a village and municipality in Piešťany District in the Trnava Region of western Slovakia.

== History ==
In historical records the village was first mentioned in 1240. The Roman Catholic church of st. Margita Antioch was built there in 1320 and it is still present. The lower part of the tower and the perimeter wall of the church are dated to the 13th century. The tower was rebuilt by Andrej Škrabal and his brother Štefan in 1659. Andrej Škrabal is buried in the church interior under a stone slab that dates back to 1700.

== Geography ==
The municipality lies at an altitude of 156 metres (512 ft) and covers an area of 8.43 km^{2} (3.25 sq mi) (2025).

== Population ==
Population statistic (10 years)
Year	1995	2005	2015	2025
Count	961	961	1044	1067
Difference		+0%	+8.63%	+2.20%

Population statistic
Year	2024	2025
Count	1074	1067
Difference		−0.65%

It has a population of 1067 people (31 December 2025).

=== Ethnicity ===
Census 2021 (1+ %)
Ethnicity	Number	Fraction
Slovak	999	92.58%
Romani	88	8.15%
Not found out	77	7.13%
Total	1079	

In year 2021 was 1079 people by ethnicity 999 as Slovak, 88 as Romani, 77 as Not found out, 7 as Czech, 6 as Other, 4 as Hungarian, 3 as Austrian, 3 as Polish, 2 as Italian, 1 as Ukrainian, 1 as Serbian and 1 as Russian.

Note on population: The difference values of population numbers in the table "Population statistic" and in the sections "Ethnicity" & "Religion" is caused by the use of various statistical methods.

=== Religion ===
Census 2021 (1+ %)
Religion	Number	Fraction
Roman Catholic Church	763	70.71%
None	209	19.37%
Not found out	71	6.58%
Evangelical Church	14	1.3%
Total	1079	

In year 2021 was 1079 people by religion 763 from Roman Catholic Church, 209 from None, 71 from Not found out, 14 from Evangelical Church, 6 from Jehovah's Witnesses, 4 from Islam, 4 from Ad hoc movements, 3 from Other, 2 from Christian Congregations in Slovakia, 2 from Greek Catholic Church and 1 from Paganism and natural spirituality.
