= Chtelnica =

- Municipality
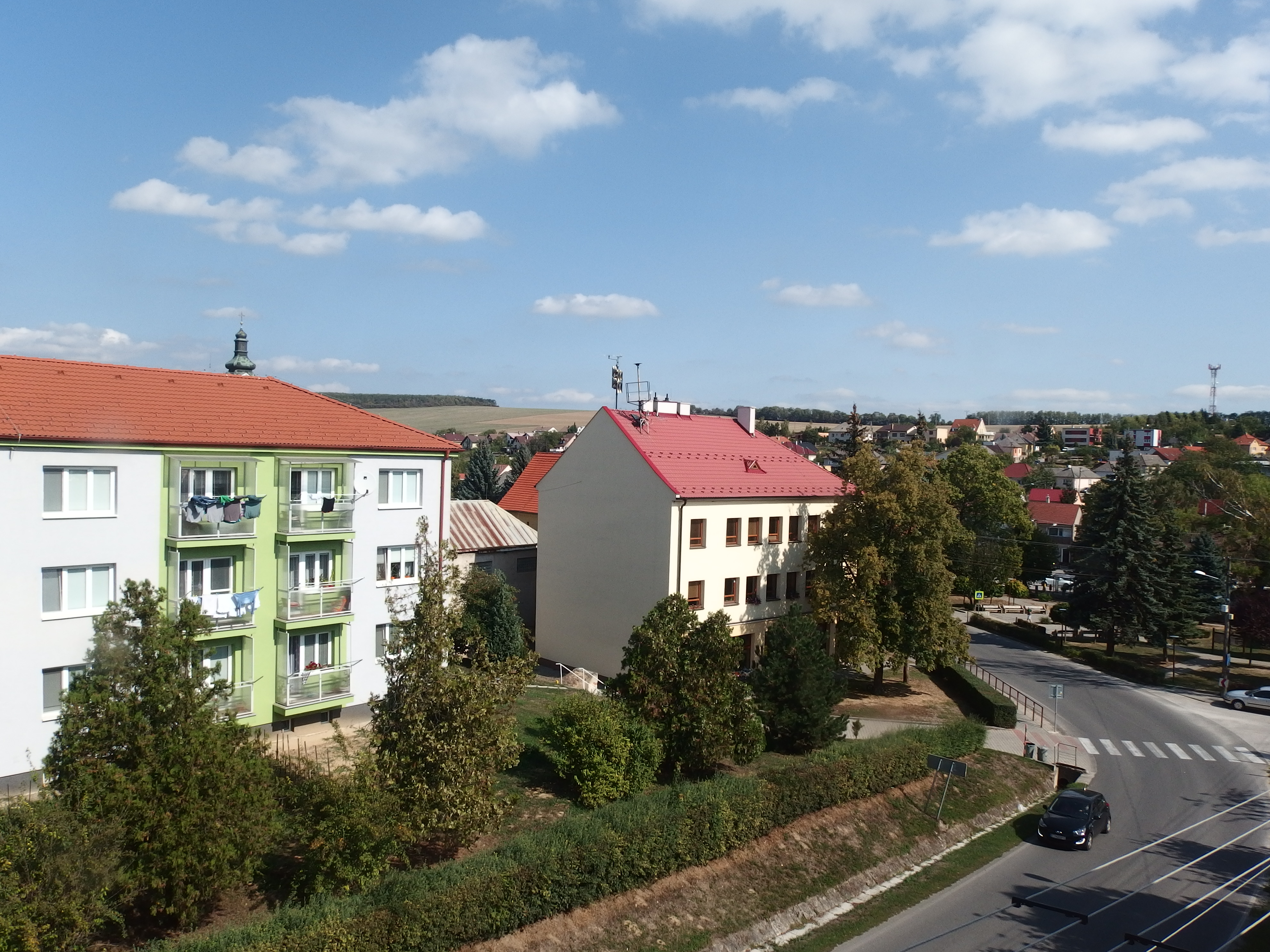

- Flag

- Location of Chtelnica in the Trnava Region Location of Chtelnica in Slovakia
- Coordinates: 48.57°N 17.62°E
- Country: Slovakia
- Region: Trnava Region
- District: Piešťany District
- First mentioned: 1216

Area
  - Total: 32.96 km^{2} (12.73 sq mi)
- Elevation: 199 m (653 ft)

Population (2025)
  - Total: 2,523
- Time zone: UTC+1 (CET)
  - Summer (DST): UTC+2 (CEST)
- Postal code: 922 05
- Area code: +421 33
- Vehicle registration plate (until 2022): PN
- Website: www.chtelnica.sk

Chtelnica (Hungarian: Vittenc) is a village and municipality in Piešťany District in the Trnava Region of western Slovakia.

== History ==
In historical records the village was first mentioned in 1208. The Hungarian name was Vittenc. The small Jewish community remaining were deported to Nazi death camps Lublin Poland on May 8, 1942

== Geography ==
The municipality lies at an altitude of 199 metres (653 ft) and covers an area of 32.96 km^{2} (12.73 sq mi) (2025).

== Population ==
Population statistic (10 years)
Year	1995	2005	2015	2025
Count	2519	2554	2582	2523
Difference		+1.38%	+1.09%	−2.28%

Population statistic
Year	2024	2025
Count	2510	2523
Difference		+0.51%

It has a population of 2523 people (31 December 2025).

=== Ethnicity ===
Census 2021 (1+ %)
Ethnicity	Number	Fraction
Slovak	2492	96.88%
Not found out	72	2.79%
Total	2572	

In year 2021 was 2572 people by ethnicity 2492 as Slovak, 72 as Not found out, 9 as Hungarian, 8 as Russian, 7 as Czech, 6 as Other, 4 as Ukrainian, 2 as Romanian, 2 as Moravian, 1 as Serbian and 1 as Rusyn.

Note on population: The difference values of population numbers in the table "Population statistic" and in the sections "Ethnicity" & "Religion" is caused by the use of various statistical methods.

=== Religion ===
Census 2021 (1+ %)
Religion	Number	Fraction
Roman Catholic Church	1997	77.64%
None	417	16.21%
Not found out	68	2.64%
Evangelical Church	27	1.05%
Total	2572	

In year 2021 was 2572 people by religion 1997 from Roman Catholic Church, 417 from None, 68 from Not found out, 27 from Evangelical Church, 11 from Ad hoc movements, 10 from Jehovah's Witnesses, 10 from Christian Congregations in Slovakia, 8 from Greek Catholic Church, 5 from Other, 4 from Eastern Orthodox Church, 4 from Islam, 4 from Buddhism, 2 from Other and not ascertained christian church, 1 from Calvinist Church, 1 from Paganism and natural spirituality, 1 from Hinduism, 1 from Czechoslovak Hussite Church and 1 from Church of Jesus Christ of Latter-day Saints.

== Genealogical resources ==
The records for genealogical research are available at the state archive "Statny Archiv in Bratislava, Slovakia"

- Roman Catholic church records (births/marriages/deaths): 1695-1900 (parish A)

== See also ==
- List of municipalities and towns in Slovakia
