= Šterusy =

- Municipality
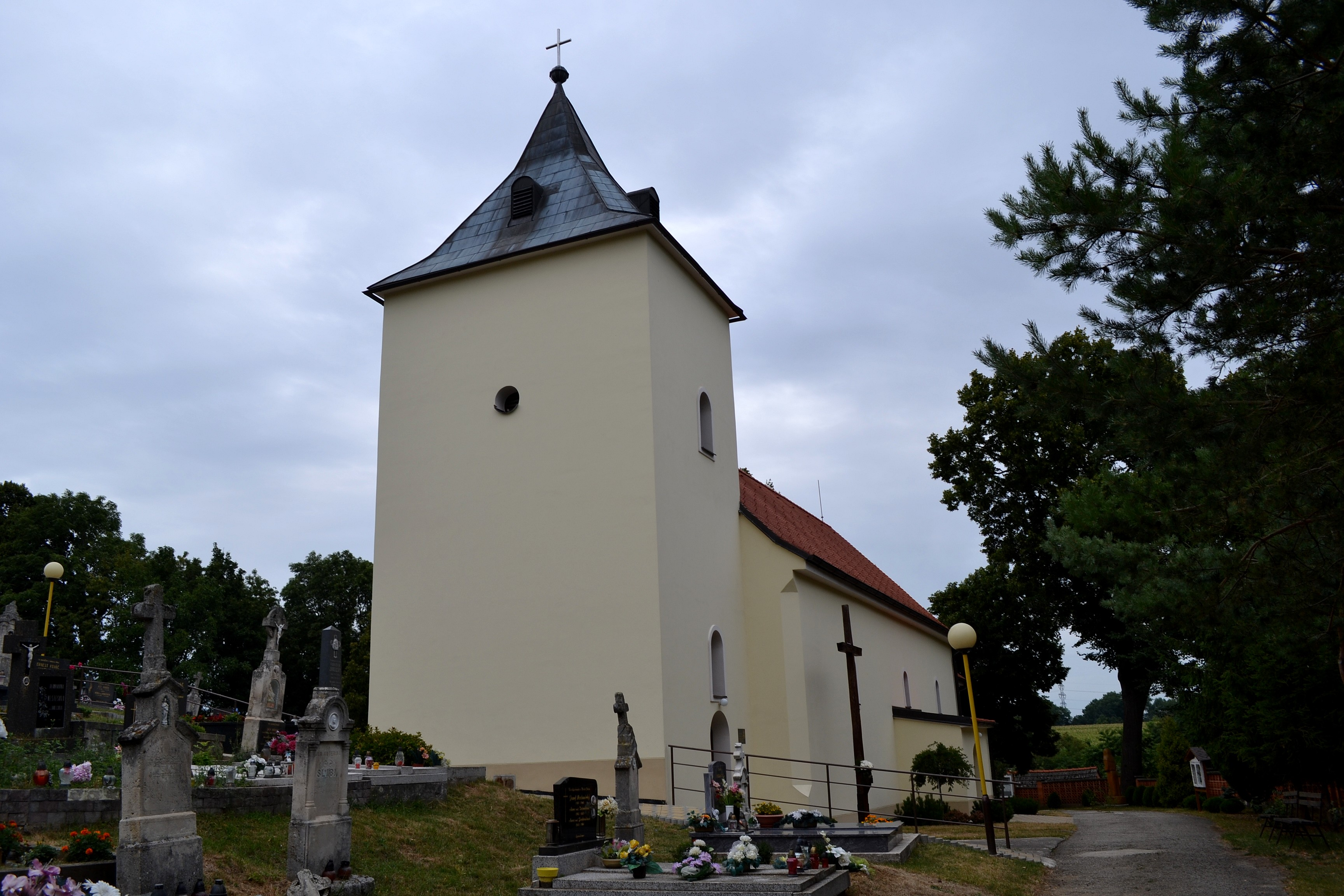
- Church in Šterusy

- Flag

- Location of Šterusy in the Trnava Region Location of Šterusy in Slovakia
- Coordinates: 48.60°N 17.68°E
- Country: Slovakia
- Region: Trnava Region
- District: Piešťany District
- First mentioned: 1262

Area
  - Total: 11.08 km^{2} (4.28 sq mi)
- Elevation: 209 m (686 ft)

Population (2025)
  - Total: 447
- Time zone: UTC+1 (CET)
  - Summer (DST): UTC+2 (CEST)
- Postal code: 922 03
- Area code: +421 33
- Vehicle registration plate (until 2022): PN
- Website: www.sterusy.sk

Šterusy (Hungarian: Cseterőc) is a village and municipality in Piešťany District in the Trnava Region of western Slovakia.

== History ==
Before 1262, the land was the property of the Nitra Castle. In historical records the village was first mentioned in 1262 under the name Cheteruch from 1262, when King Béla IV of Hungary donated land to comes Zochuda and his family. Later, the Erdődy family became the owners of the properties in the village, and in the middle of the 19th century, the Pállfy family.

In the years 1850 – 1861 and 1872 – 1960, Šterusy belonged to the district of Piešťany. In the years 1961-1996, Šterusy was part of the Trnava district. In the years 1975-1990, the village was a part of the Vrbový district. In 1996, Šterusy was included in the renewed district of Piešťany and the newly formed Trnava region. Since 2000, the village of Šterusy has been a founding member of the Nad Holeškou Microregion and a member of the ZMO - Jaslovské Bohunice region founded in 1991.

== Geography ==
The municipality lies at an altitude of 209 metres (686 ft) and covers an area of 11.08 km^{2} (4.28 sq mi) (2025). The territory of the village includes is the nature reserve Orlie skaly. The Šteruský stream flows through the village's farmsteads.

== Population ==
Population statistic (10 years)
Year	1995	2005	2015	2025
Count	518	518	498	447
Difference		+0%	−3.86%	−10.24%

Population statistic
Year	2024	2025
Count	463	447
Difference		−3.45%

It has a population of 447 people (31 December 2025).

=== Ethnicity ===
Census 2021 (1+ %)
Ethnicity	Number	Fraction
Slovak	474	96.53%
Not found out	16	3.25%
Total	491	

In year 2021 was 491 people by ethnicity 474 as Slovak, 16 as Not found out, 1 as Czech, 1 as Vietnamese, 1 as Ukrainian, 1 as Rusyn and 1 as Hungarian.

Note on population: The difference values of population numbers in the table "Population statistic" and in the sections "Ethnicity" & "Religion" is caused by the use of various statistical methods.

=== Religion ===
Census 2021 (1+ %)
Religion	Number	Fraction
Roman Catholic Church	399	81.26%
None	46	9.37%
Not found out	17	3.46%
Evangelical Church	14	2.85%
Christian Congregations in Slovakia	6	1.22%
Total	491	

In year 2021 was 491 people by religion 399 from Roman Catholic Church, 46 from None, 17 from Not found out, 14 from Evangelical Church, 6 from Christian Congregations in Slovakia, 2 from Eastern Orthodox Church, 2 from Jehovah's Witnesses, 2 from Greek Catholic Church, 1 from Calvinist Church, 1 from Buddhism and 1 from Baptists Church.
