= Borovce =

- Municipality
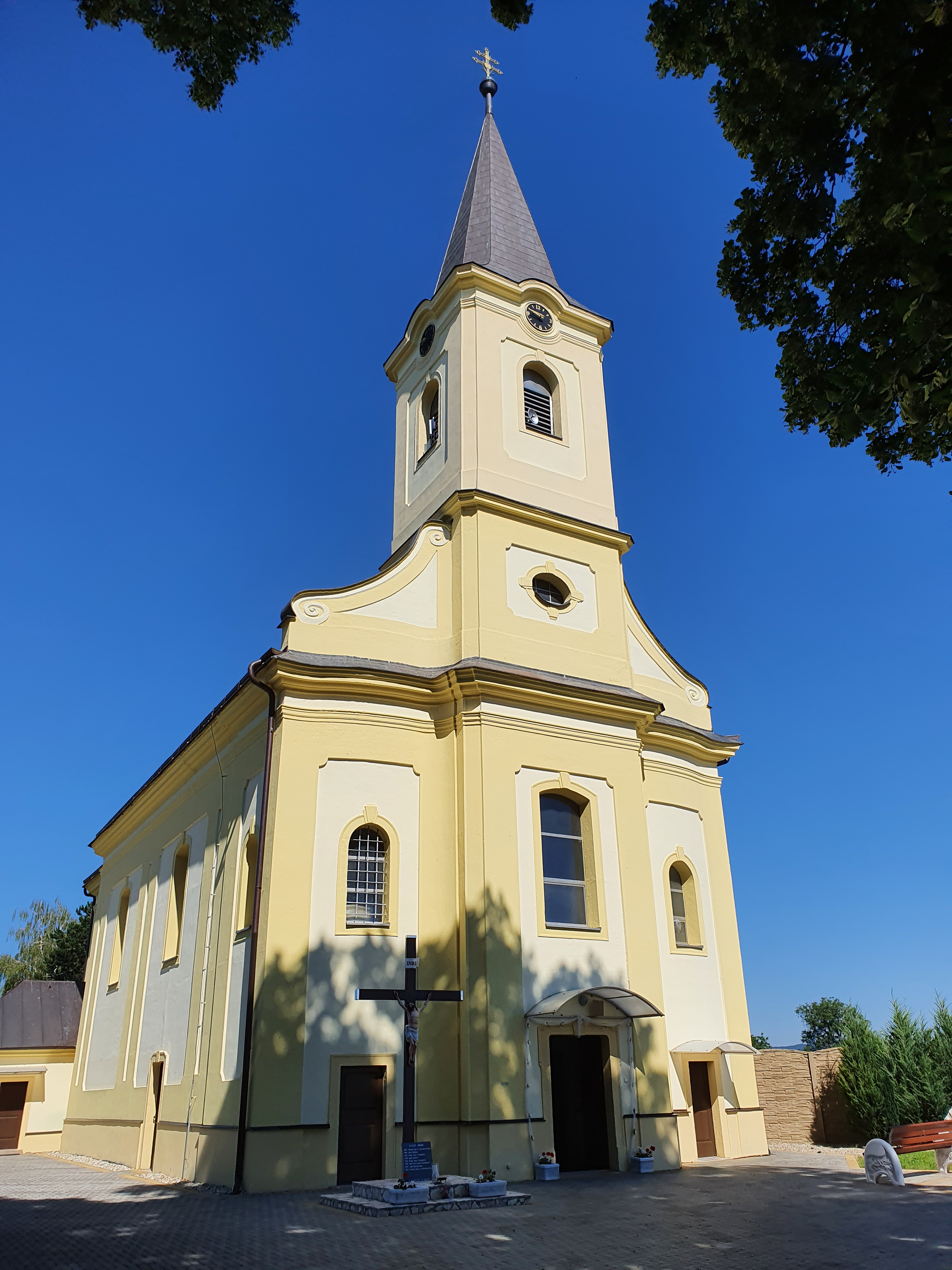
- Church in Borovce

- Flag

- Location of Borovce in the Trnava Region Location of Borovce in Slovakia
- Coordinates: 48.58°N 17.75°E
- Country: Slovakia
- Region: Trnava Region
- District: Piešťany District
- First mentioned: 1262

Area
  - Total: 10.87 km^{2} (4.20 sq mi)
- Elevation: 161 m (528 ft)

Population (2025)
  - Total: 1,230
- Time zone: UTC+1 (CET)
  - Summer (DST): UTC+2 (CEST)
- Postal code: 922 09
- Area code: +421 33
- Vehicle registration plate (until 2022): PN
- Website: www.borovce.sk

Borovce (Hungarian: Vágbori) is a village and municipality in Piešťany District in the Trnava Region of western Slovakia.

== History ==
In historical records the village was first mentioned in 1262.

== Geography ==
The municipality lies at an altitude of 161 metres (528 ft) and covers an area of 10.87 km^{2} (4.20 sq mi) (2025).

== Population ==
Population statistic (10 years)
| Year | 1995 | 2005 | 2015 | 2025 |
|---|---|---|---|---|
| Count | 850 | 935 | 1005 | 1230 |
| Difference | | +10% | +7.48% | +22.38% |

Population statistic
| Year | 2024 | 2025 |
|---|---|---|
| Count | 1211 | 1230 |
| Difference | | +1.56% |

It has a population of 1230 people (31 December 2025).

=== Ethnicity ===
Census 2021 (1+ %)
| Ethnicity | Number | Fraction |
|---|---|---|
| Slovak | 1040 | 96.29% |
| Not found out | 37 | 3.42% |
| Total | 1080 | |

In year 2021 was 1080 people by ethnicity 1040 as Slovak, 37 as Not found out, 10 as Czech, 2 as Rusyn, 2 as Greek, 2 as French, 1 as Jewish, 1 as Serbian, 1 as Russian, 1 as Hungarian, 1 as Other and 1 as English.

Note on population: The difference values of population numbers in the table "Population statistic" and in the sections "Ethnicity" & "Religion" is caused by the use of various statistical methods.

=== Religion ===
Census 2021 (1+ %)
| Religion | Number | Fraction |
|---|---|---|
| Roman Catholic Church | 730 | 67.59% |
| None | 240 | 22.22% |
| Not found out | 57 | 5.28% |
| Evangelical Church | 26 | 2.41% |
| Total | 1080 | |

In year 2021 was 1080 people by religion 730 from Roman Catholic Church, 240 from None, 57 from Not found out, 26 from Evangelical Church, 7 from Jehovah's Witnesses, 7 from Other, 5 from Other and not ascertained christian church, 4 from Greek Catholic Church, 2 from Ad hoc movements, 1 from Christian Congregations in Slovakia and 1 from Buddhism.

== Genealogical resources ==
The records for genealogical research are available at the state archive "Statny Archiv in Bratislava, Slovakia"

- Roman Catholic church records (births/marriages/deaths): 1707-1916 (parish A)

== See also ==
- List of municipalities and towns in Slovakia
