= Nižná, Piešťany District =

Nižná
- Municipality
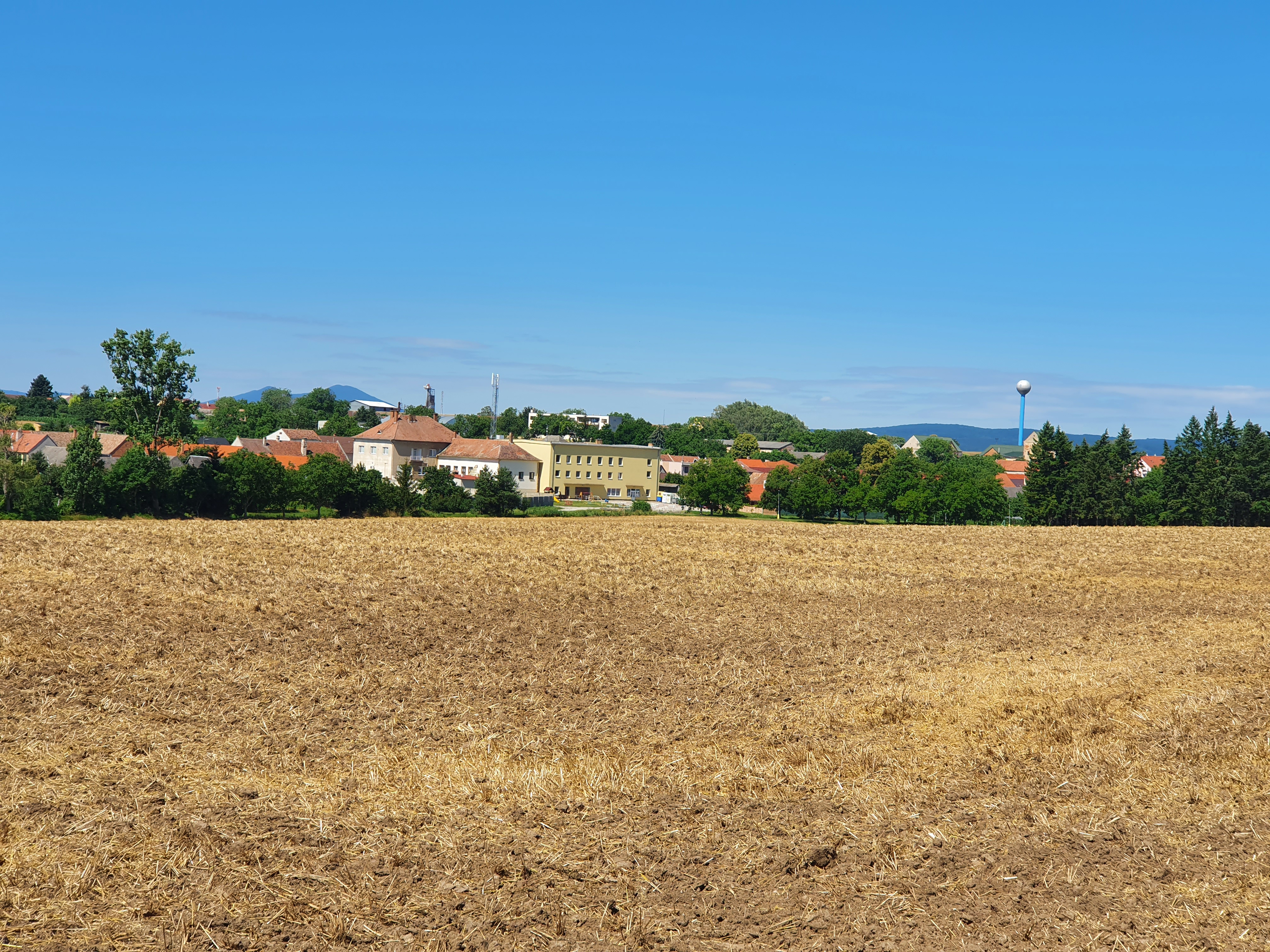

- Flag

- Location of Nižná in the Trnava Region Location of Nižná in Slovakia
- Coordinates: 48°32′11″N 17°39′20″E
- Country: Slovakia
- Region: Trnava Region
- District: Piešťany District
- First mentioned: 1532

Area
  - Total: 8.05 km^{2} (3.11 sq mi)
- Elevation: 180 m (590 ft)

Population (2025)
  - Total: 537
- Time zone: UTC+1 (CET)
  - Summer (DST): UTC+2 (CEST)
- Postal code: 922 06
- Area code: +421 33
- Vehicle registration plate (until 2022): PN
- Website: www.obecnizna.sk

Nižná (Hungarian: Nézsnafalva) is a village and municipality in Piešťany District in the Trnava Region of western Slovakia.

== History ==
In historical records the village was first mentioned in 1532.

== Geography ==
The municipality lies at an altitude of 180 metres (590 ft) and covers an area of 8.05 km^{2} (3.11 sq mi) (2025).

== Population ==
Population statistic (10 years)
Year	1995	2005	2015	2025
Count	510	527	552	537
Difference		+3.33%	+4.74%	−2.71%

Population statistic
Year	2024	2025
Count	552	537
Difference		−2.71%

It has a population of 537 people (31 December 2025).

=== Ethnicity ===
Census 2021 (1+ %)
Ethnicity	Number	Fraction
Slovak	533	97.79%
Not found out	9	1.65%
Other	6	1.1%
Total	545	

In year 2021 was 545 people by ethnicity 533 as Slovak, 9 as Not found out, 6 as Other, 2 as Italian, 1 as Czech, 1 as Serbian, 1 as Rusyn, 1 as Russian, 1 as Polish and 1 as Hungarian.

Note on population: The difference values of population numbers in the table "Population statistic" and in the sections "Ethnicity" & "Religion" is caused by the use of various statistical methods.

=== Religion ===
Census 2021 (1+ %)
Religion	Number	Fraction
Roman Catholic Church	443	81.28%
None	76	13.94%
Not found out	12	2.2%
Total	545	

In year 2021 was 545 people by religion 443 from Roman Catholic Church, 76 from None, 12 from Not found out, 4 from Islam, 2 from Eastern Orthodox Church, 2 from Other and not ascertained christian church, 2 from Greek Catholic Church, 2 from Evangelical Church, 1 from Jewish community and 1 from Other.
