= Piešťany District =

Coordinates: 48°35′21″N 17°50′3″E

District Piešťany
- District
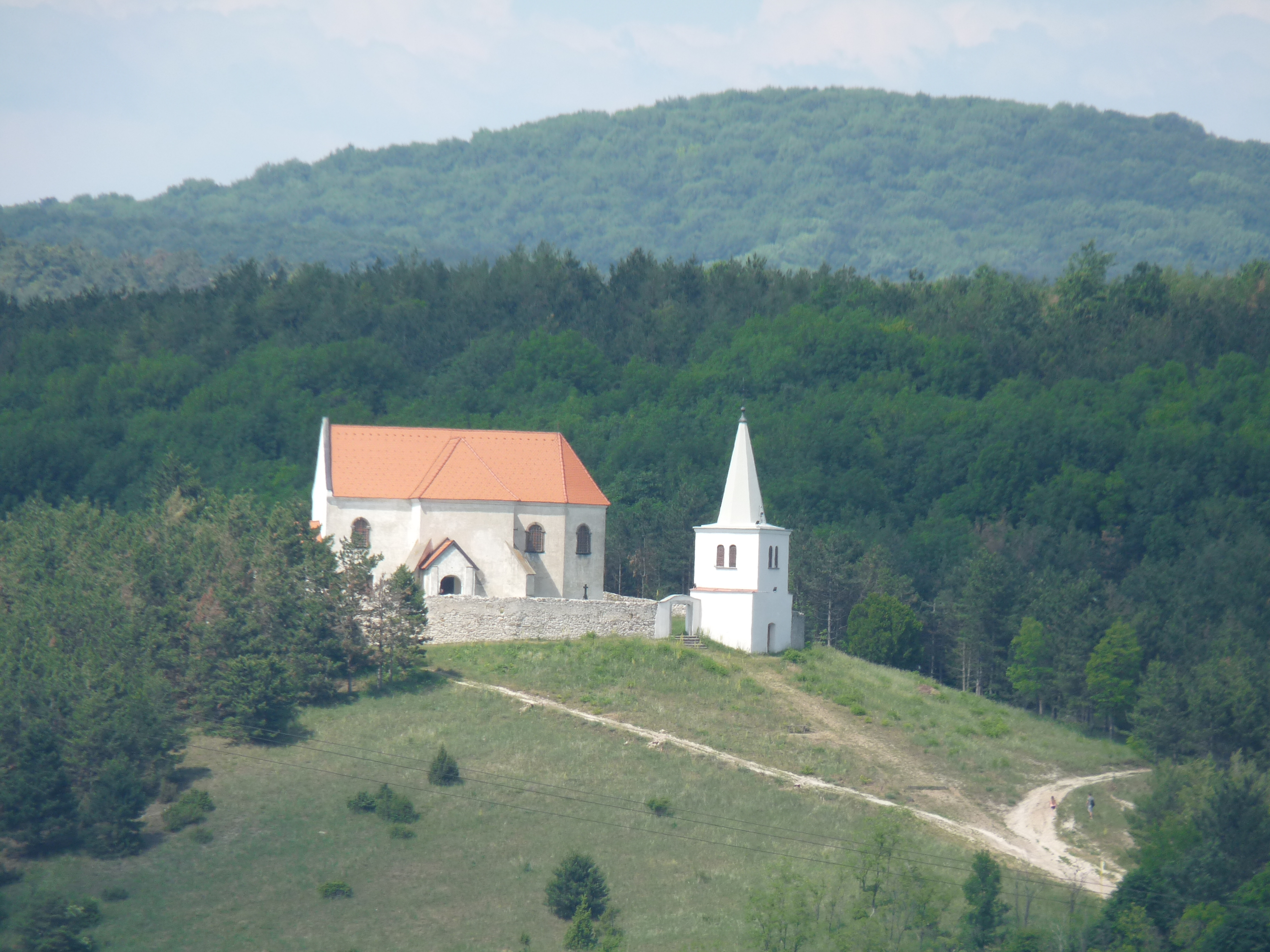
- Country: Slovakia
- Region (kraj): Trnava Region
- Seat: Piešťany

Area
  - Total: 381.12 km^{2} (147.15 sq mi)

Population (2025)
  - Total: 61,476
- Time zone: UTC+1 (CET)
  - Summer (DST): UTC+2 (CEST)
- Telephone prefix: 033
- Vehicle registration plate (until 2022): PN
- Municipalities: 27

Piešťany District (Slovak: okres Piešťany) is a district in the Trnava Region of western Slovakia, with the town of Piešťany being as its seat, cultural and economic center.

== History ==
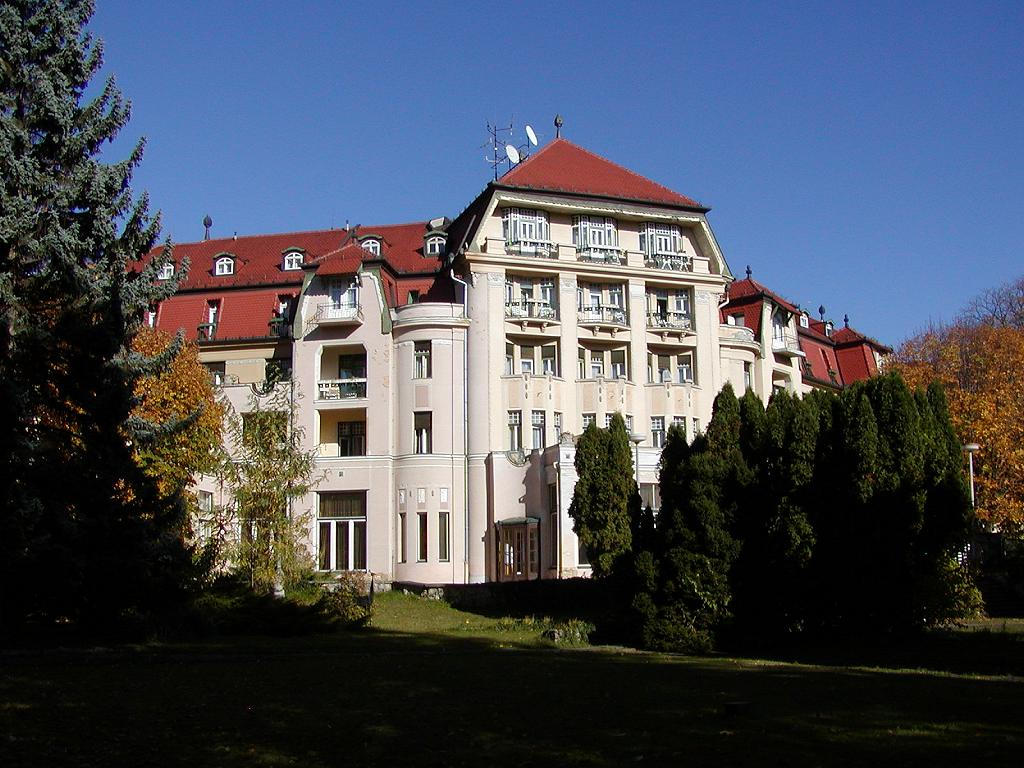
Piestany

The lands of the current Pieštany District have been inhabited since the Paleolithic era, but many archaeological findings are dated even earlier, for example the known Venus of Moravany is dated from the earlier Stone Ages (22,800 BC). Many hillforts were built in the Iron Ages. In the 1st century AD, it was centre of Germanic kingdom in the Váh region. The Slavs started to move into the area in the 5th and 6th centuries, who were ruling the area until the early 10th century, when the Magyar tribes started to move into the area, however, the area remained predominantly Slavic. The most known monument from this part is the Great Moravian hillfort near the village of Ducové, which existed from the second half of the 9th to the first half of the 10th century. Since the 13th century, the area was part of the Nitra comitatus, which evolved later into the Nitra county, which existed until 1918. The area suffered in the 15th and again in the 16th and particularly 17th centuries, first when the Hussites were warring, and not put out until 1473, with their last stand near Veľké Kostoľany captured by the forces of the Matthias Corvinus. The Ottomans encroaching from the south were threatening the area mainly since 1663, after fall of the Nové Zámky fortress, but were put out near the end of the 17th century. The Anti-Habsburg uprisings in the 17th and in the early 18th century were also causing trouble. The now well-known spas in Piešťany were discovered in the 16th century. Until 1918, the district was part of the Hungarian county of Nitra.

In 1918, it became part of the first Czechoslovak republic, first as part of the Bratislava county, and later as part of the so-called Slovak Land. During the wartime Slovak Republic, it was part of the extended Trenčín county. When Czechoslovak rule was restored in 1945, it was a district until 1960, at which time it became part of the Trnava district, belonging to the Western Slovak Region. After Slovakia's independence in 1993, the current district was formed in 1996.

== Geography ==
The district lies in the northern part of the Trnava Region. It is bordered by the Trnava District in the west and southwest, Hlohovec District in the south, Topoľčany District in the Nitra Region in the southeast and east, Nové Mesto nad Váhom District in the northeast and north and by the Myjava District in the northwest (both previous belong to the Trenčín Region). The main geographical features are the Little Carpathians in the west, Váh Inovec in the east, Danubian Hills in the center and south and the Váh and Dudváh rivers.

Piešťany District has an area of 381.12 km^{2}.

== Population ==
Historical population
Year	Pop.	±%
1970	56,814	—
1980	61,335	+8.0%
1991	63,906	+4.2%
2001	63,928	+0.0%
2011	63,152	−1.2%
2021	63,032	−0.2%
Source: Statistical Office of the Slovak Republic

Population statistic (10 years)
Year	1995	2005	2015	2025
Count	64,079	64,019	62,996	61,476
Difference		−0.09%	−1.59%	−2.41%

Population statistic
Year	2024	2025
Count	61,773	61,476
Difference		−0.48%

It has a population of 61,476 people (31 December 2025).

=== Ethnicity ===
Census 2021 (1+ %)
Ethnicity	Number	Fraction
Slovak	58,693	91.07%
Not found out	3547	5.5%
Czech	700	1.08%
Total	64,444	

In year 2021 was 64,444 people by ethnicity 58,693 as Slovak, 3547 as Not found out, 700 as Czech, 308 as Other, 198 as Romani, 177 as Hungarian, 174 as Russian, 92 as Ukrainian, 74 as German, 59 as Vietnamese, 53 as Rusyn, 40 as Serbian, 38 as Italian, 38 as Polish, 33 as Moravian, 32 as English, 30 as Jewish, 29 as Croatian, 28 as Austrian, 23 as French, 15 as Romanian, 12 as Bulgarian, 11 as Turkish, 10 as Canadian, 7 as Chinese, 7 as Albanian, 5 as Silesian, 4 as Irish, 4 as Greek and 3 as Korean.

Note on population: The difference values of population numbers in the table "Population statistic" and in the sections "Ethnicity" & "Religion" is caused by the use of various statistical methods.

=== Religion ===
Census 2021 (1+ %)
Religion	Number	Fraction
Roman Catholic Church	38,830	61.6%
None	15,625	24.79%
Not found out	4103	6.51%
Evangelical Church	2505	3.97%
Total	63,032	

In year 2021 was 63,032 people by religion 38,830 from Roman Catholic Church, 15,625 from None, 4103 from Not found out, 2505 from Evangelical Church, 286 from Jehovah's Witnesses, 272 from Ad hoc movements, 264 from Greek Catholic Church, 238 from Other, 167 from Eastern Orthodox Church, 150 from Christian Congregations in Slovakia, 132 from Buddhism, 89 from Islam, 75 from Other and not ascertained christian church, 63 from Paganism and natural spirituality, 56 from Calvinist Church, 37 from Jewish community, 36 from Apostolic Church, 27 from United Methodist Church, 17 from Seventh-day Adventist Church, 15 from Czechoslovak Hussite Church, 13 from Hinduism, 11 from Old Catholic Church, 9 from Church of the Brethren, 7 from Church of Jesus Christ of Latter-day Saints, 3 from Baptists Church, 1 from New Apostolic Church and 1 from Bahá'i Community.

== Municipalities ==
Piešťany District has 27 municipalities, of which 2 have a town statute. 56.5% of the district's population lives in towns.

Municipality	Area [km^{2}]	Population
Banka	8.58	2,158
Bašovce	4.04	334
Borovce	10.87	1,230
Dolný Lopašov	22.93	955
Drahovce	24.04	2,585
Dubovany	11.33	1,095
Ducové	2.63	479
Hubina	26.84	526
Chtelnica	32.96	2,523
Kočín-Lančár	13.11	504
Krakovany	9.84	1,454
Moravany nad Váhom	10.78	2,503
Nižná	8.05	537
Ostrov	9.35	1,217
Pečeňady	8.57	569
Piešťany	44.20	26,086
Prašník	27.88	817
Rakovice	6.95	653
Ratnovce	8.43	1,067
Sokolovce	6.57	1,430
Šípkové	8.30	299
Šterusy	11.08	447
Trebatice	7.66	1,331
Veľké Kostoľany	24.45	2,847
Veľké Orvište	3.83	1,073
Veselé	13.86	1,234
Vrbové	13.96	5,523

Population and area values are current for year 2025.

== Sources ==
- http://www.statistics.sk/mosmis/eng/run.html
- Klčo, Marián (2005). Okres Piešťany - stručná história a erby miest a obcí. Balneological museum in Piešťany. pp. 5–11. ISBN 80-968258-0-1. Archived from the original on 2001-10-07. (Slovak, with brief summary in German)
