= Želovce =

Želovce Zsély
- Municipality
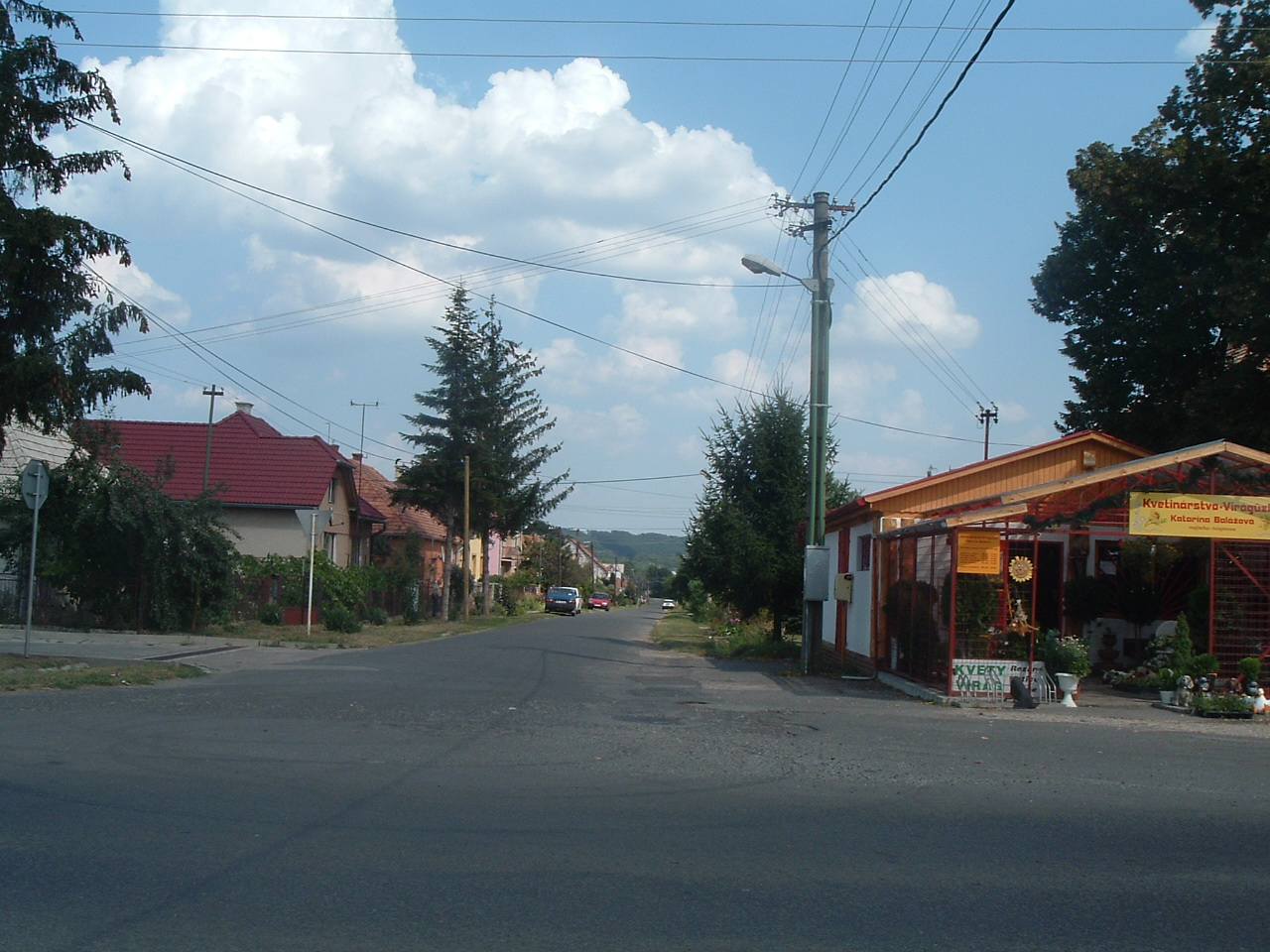

- Flag

- Location of Želovce in the Banská Bystrica Region Location of Želovce in Slovakia
- Coordinates: 48.13°N 19.37°E
- Country: Slovakia
- Region: Banská Bystrica Region
- District: Veľký Krtíš District
- First mentioned: 1327

Area
  - Total: 18.75 km^{2} (7.24 sq mi)
- Elevation: 156 m (512 ft)

Population (2025)
  - Total: 1,143
- Time zone: UTC+1 (CET)
  - Summer (DST): UTC+2 (CEST)
- Postal code: 991 06
- Area code: +421 47
- Vehicle registration plate (until 2022): VK
- Website: www.zelovce.sk

Želovce (Hungarian: Zsély) is a village and municipality in the Veľký Krtíš District of the Banská Bystrica Region of southern Slovakia. According to the 2016 census the population of Zelovce is 1,276.

== Geography ==
The municipality lies at an altitude of 156 metres (512 ft) and covers an area of 18.75 km^{2} (7.24 sq mi) (2025).

== Population ==
Population statistic (10 years)
Year	1995	2005	2015	2025
Count	1329	1318	1279	1143
Difference		−0.82%	−2.95%	−10.63%

Population statistic
Year	2024	2025
Count	1154	1143
Difference		−0.95%

It has a population of 1143 people (31 December 2025).

=== Ethnicity ===
Census 2021 (1+ %)
Ethnicity	Number	Fraction
Slovak	1062	88.05%
Hungarian	196	16.25%
Not found out	32	2.65%
Total	1206	

In year 2021 was 1206 people by ethnicity 1062 as Slovak, 196 as Hungarian, 32 as Not found out, 7 as French, 2 as Italian, 1 as Czech and 1 as Other.

Note on population: The difference values of population numbers in the table "Population statistic" and in the sections "Ethnicity" & "Religion" is caused by the use of various statistical methods.

=== Religion ===
Census 2021 (1+ %)
Religion	Number	Fraction
Roman Catholic Church	915	75.87%
None	170	14.1%
Evangelical Church	77	6.38%
Not found out	27	2.24%
Total	1206	

In year 2021 was 1206 people by religion 915 from Roman Catholic Church, 170 from None, 77 from Evangelical Church, 27 from Not found out, 6 from Greek Catholic Church, 4 from Calvinist Church, 2 from Ad hoc movements, 1 from Old Catholic Church, 1 from Paganism and natural spirituality, 1 from Jehovah's Witnesses, 1 from Buddhism and 1 from Baptists Church.
