= 2016 World Rowing Championships – Men's lightweight single sculls =

Men's lightweight single sculls at the 2016 World Rowing Championships
- Venue: Willem-Alexander Baan
- Location: Rotterdam, Netherlands
- Dates: 22–27 August
- Competitors: 25 from 25 nations
- Winning time: 7:32:84

Medalists
gold medal	Paul O'Donovan	Ireland
silver medal	Péter Galambos	Hungary
bronze medal	Lukáš Babač	Slovakia

The men's lightweight single sculls competition at the 2016 World Rowing Championships in Rotterdam took place at the Willem-Alexander Baan.

== Schedule ==
The schedule was as follows:

Date	Time	Round
Monday 22 August 2016	16:55	Heats
Tuesday 23 August 2016	11:20	Repechage
Wednesday 24 August 2016	16:00	Quarterfinals
Thursday 25 August 2016	15:35	Semifinals A/B
Friday 26 August 2016	11:55	Semifinals C/D
Saturday 27 August 2016	10:45	Final D
Saturday 27 August 2016	11:00	Final C
Saturday 27 August 2016	11:20	Final B
Saturday 27 August 2016	12:40	Final A

All times are Central European Summer Time (UTC+2)

== Results ==
=== Heats ===
The four fastest boats in each heat advanced directly to the quarterfinals. The remaining boats were sent to the repechage.

==== Heat 1 ====
Rank	Rower	Country	Time	Notes
1	Silvan Zehnder	Switzerland	7:17.66	Q
2	José Gómez-Feria	Spain	7:21.35	Q
3	Jerzy Kowalski	Poland	7:24.63	Q
4	Juho-Pekka Petäjäniemi	Finland	7:25.90	Q
5	Sargis Gharabaghtsyan	Armenia	9:38.93	R

==== Heat 2 ====
Rank	Rower	Country	Time	Notes
1	Konstantin Steinhübel	Germany	7:04.36	Q
2	Rajko Hrvat	Slovenia	7:07.37	Q
3	Péter Galambos	Hungary	7:18.19	Q
4	Iurii Peshkov	Russia	7:36.78	Q
5	Andres Mejia	Colombia	8:02.01	R

==== Heat 3 ====
Rank	Rower	Country	Time	Notes
1	Paul O'Donovan	Ireland	7:11.73	Q
2	Yuki Ikeda	Japan	7:16.87	Q
3	Miloš Stanojević	Serbia	7:19.70	Q
4	Liu Jiajian	China	7:23.04	Q
5	Bart Lukkes	Netherlands	7:30.12	R

==== Heat 4 ====
Rank	Rower	Country	Time	Notes
1	Matteo Mulas	Italy	7:20.26	Q
2	Luka Radonić	Croatia	7:22.06	Q
3	Renzo León García	Peru	7:22.92	Q
4	Prem Nampratueng	Thailand	7:23.10	Q
5	Mattias Johansson	Sweden	7:23.11	R

==== Heat 5 ====
Rank	Rower	Country	Time	Notes
1	Lukáš Babač	Slovakia	7:11.54	Q
2	Matthias Taborsky	Austria	7:16.54	Q
3	Colin Ethridge	United States	7:21.44	Q
4	Milan Viktora	Czech Republic	7:29.25	Q
5	Alhussein Ghambour	Libya	7:49.98	R

=== Repechage ===
The four fastest boats advanced to the final. The remaining boat took no further part in the competition.

Rank	Rower	Country	Time	Notes
1	Bart Lukkes	Netherlands	7:17.98	Q
2	Mattias Johansson	Sweden	7:29.21	Q
3	Andres Mejia	Colombia	7:37.67	Q
4	Alhussein Ghambour	Libya	7:38.74	Q
5	Sargis Gharabaghtsyan	Armenia	8:30.89	

=== Quarterfinals ===
The three fastest boats in each quarter advanced to the A/B semifinals. The remaining boats were sent to the C/D semifinals.

==== Quarterfinal 1 ====
Rank	Rower	Country	Time	Notes
1	Konstantin Steinhübel	Germany	6:58.20	SA/B
2	Miloš Stanojević	Serbia	6:58.52	SA/B
3	Silvan Zehnder	Switzerland	7:00.07	SA/B
4	Milan Viktora	Czech Republic	7:06.30	SC/D
5	Renzo León García	Peru	7:19.58	SC/D
6	Alhussein Ghambour	Libya	7:44.36	SC/D

==== Quarterfinal 2 ====
Rank	Rower	Country	Time	Notes
1	Paul O'Donovan	Ireland	6:54.79	SA/B
2	Colin Ethridge	United States	6:57.06	SA/B
3	Luka Radonić	Croatia	7:01.04	SA/B
4	Jerzy Kowalski	Poland	7:04.48	SC/D
5	Iurii Peshkov	Russia	7:09.48	SC/D
6	Mattias Johansson	Sweden	7:21.77	SC/D

==== Quarterfinal 3 ====
Rank	Rower	Country	Time	Notes
1	Péter Galambos	Hungary	6:56.19	SA/B
2	José Gómez-Feria	Spain	7:02.73	SA/B
3	Matteo Mulas	Italy	7:08.36	SA/B
4	Liu Jiajian	China	7:20.06	SC/D
5	Andres Mejia	Colombia	7:44.18	SC/D
–	Matthias Taborsky	Austria	DNF	SC/D

==== Quarterfinal 4 ====
Rank	Rower	Country	Time	Notes
1	Lukáš Babač	Slovakia	6:55.86	SA/B
2	Rajko Hrvat	Slovenia	6:57.58	SA/B
3	Yuki Ikeda	Japan	6:59.08	SA/B
4	Bart Lukkes	Netherlands	7:01.87	SC/D
5	Juho-Pekka Petäjäniemi	Finland	7:11.34	SC/D
6	Prem Nampratueng	Thailand	7:22.87	SC/D

=== Semifinals C/D ===
The three fastest boats in each semi were sent to the C final. The remaining boats were sent to the D final.

==== Semifinal 1 ====
Rank	Rower	Country	Time	Notes
1	Jerzy Kowalski	Poland	7:37.40	FC
2	Milan Viktora	Czech Republic	7:42.23	FC
3	Matthias Taborsky	Austria	7:44.12	FC
4	Juho-Pekka Petäjäniemi	Finland	7:45.00	FD
5	Alhussein Ghambour	Libya	8:20.04	FD
6	Andres Mejia	Colombia	8:27.11	FD

==== Semifinal 2 ====
Rank	Rower	Country	Time	Notes
1	Liu Jiajian	China	7:44.98	FC
2	Bart Lukkes	Netherlands	7:45.62	FC
3	Renzo León García	Peru	7:46.13	FC
4	Iurii Peshkov	Russia	8:03.05	FD
5	Mattias Johansson	Sweden	8:05.04	FD
6	Prem Nampratueng	Thailand	8:12.82	FD

=== Semifinals A/B ===
The three fastest boats in each semi advanced to the A final. The remaining boats were sent to the B final.

==== Semifinal 1 ====
Rank	Rower	Country	Time	Notes
1	Paul O'Donovan	Ireland	6:51.71	FA
2	Rajko Hrvat	Slovenia	6:52.31	FA
3	Konstantin Steinhübel	Germany	6:52.32	FA
4	José Gómez-Feria	Spain	6:53.21	FB
5	Silvan Zehnder	Switzerland	6:59.42	FB
6	Matteo Mulas	Italy	7:17.33	FB

==== Semifinal 2 ====
Rank	Rower	Country	Time	Notes
1	Lukáš Babač	Slovakia	6:52.50	FA
2	Péter Galambos	Hungary	6:53.12	FA
3	Miloš Stanojević	Serbia	6:54.15	FA
4	Luka Radonić	Croatia	6:57.96	FB
5	Colin Ethridge	United States	7:02.61	FB
6	Yuki Ikeda	Japan	7:06.16	FB

=== Finals ===
The A final determined the rankings for places 1 to 6. Additional rankings were determined in the other finals.

==== Final D ====
Rank	Rower	Country	Time
1	Juho-Pekka Petäjäniemi	Finland	8:01.12
2	Iurii Peshkov	Russia	8:08.90
3	Mattias Johansson	Sweden	8:09.06
4	Prem Nampratueng	Thailand	8:22.06
5	Andres Mejia	Colombia	8:33.30
6	Alhussein Ghambour	Libya	8:37.33

==== Final C ====
Rank	Rower	Country	Time
1	Jerzy Kowalski	Poland	7:51.80
2	Liu Jiajian	China	8:00.39
3	Milan Viktora	Czech Republic	8:03.25
4	Bart Lukkes	Netherlands	8:04.12
5	Matthias Taborsky	Austria	8:07.27
6	Renzo León García	Peru	8:11.76

==== Final B ====
Rank	Rower	Country	Time
1	José Gómez-Feria	Spain	7:52.21
2	Yuki Ikeda	Japan	7:52.45
3	Matteo Mulas	Italy	7:58.39
4	Colin Ethridge	United States	7:59.54
5	Luka Radonić	Croatia	8:00.21
6	Silvan Zehnder	Switzerland	8:03.73

==== Final A ====
Rank	Rower	Country	Time
1st place, gold medalist(s)	Paul O'Donovan	Ireland	7:32.84
2nd place, silver medalist(s)	Péter Galambos	Hungary	7:36.95
3rd place, bronze medalist(s)	Lukáš Babač	Slovakia	7:38.89
4	Rajko Hrvat	Slovenia	7:41.07
5	Konstantin Steinhübel	Germany	7:48.66
6	Miloš Stanojević	Serbia	7:49.03
