= 2019 World Rowing Championships – Men's lightweight single sculls =

Men's lightweight single sculls at the 2019 World Rowing Championships
- Venue: Linz-Ottensheim
- Location: Ottensheim, Austria
- Dates: 25–30 August
- Competitors: 33 from 33 nations
- Winning time: 6:59.48

Medalists
gold medal	Martino Goretti	Italy
silver medal	Péter Galambos	Hungary
bronze medal	Sean Murphy	Australia

The men's lightweight single sculls competition at the 2019 World Rowing Championships took place at the Linz-Ottensheim regatta venue.

== Schedule ==
The schedule was as follows:

Date	Time	Round
Sunday 25 August 2019	12:51	Heats
Monday 26 August 2019	14:30	Repechages
Wednesday 28 August 2019	13:43	Quarterfinals
Wednesday 28 August 2019	16:46	Semifinals E/F
Thursday 29 August 2019	13:00	Semifinals A/B
Thursday 29 August 2019	16:50	Semifinals C/D
Thursday 29 August 2019	17:05	Final F
Thursday 29 August 2019	17:20	Final E
Friday 30 August 2019	09:55	Final D
Friday 30 August 2019	10:05	Final C
Friday 30 August 2019	10:22	Final B
Friday 30 August 2019	13:55	Final A

All times are Central European Summer Time (UTC+2)

== Results ==
=== Heats ===
The three fastest boats in each heat advanced directly to the quarterfinals. The remaining boats were sent to the repechages.

==== Heat 1 ====
Rank	Rower	Country	Time	Notes
1	Péter Galambos	Hungary	7:18.73	Q
2	Benjamin van Dalen	New Zealand	7:22.99	Q
3	Chiu Hin Chun	Hong Kong	7:23.17	Q
4	Fatih Ünsal	Turkey	7:32.00	R
5	Filip Nilsson	Sweden	7:35.31	R
6	Arjun Lal Jat	India	7:36.57	R

==== Heat 2 ====
Rank	Rower	Country	Time	Notes
1	Samuel Mottram	Great Britain	7:11.48	Q
2	Rajko Hrvat	Slovenia	7:15.29	Q
3	Luka Radonić	Croatia	7:27.10	Q
4	Tibo Vyvey	Belgium	7:32.02	R
5	Dinis Costa	Portugal	7:32.03	R
6	Shehroz Hakimov	Uzbekistan	7:46.66	R

==== Heat 3 ====
Rank	Rower	Country	Time	Notes
1	Alexis López	Mexico	7:12.87	Q
2	Miłosz Jankowski	Poland	7:14.70	Q
3	Sean Murphy	Australia	7:17.11	Q
4	Jan Cincibuch	Czech Republic	7:20.90	R
5	Chen Weichun	China	7:20.94	R
6	Uncas Batista	Brazil	7:58.43	R

==== Heat 4 ====
Rank	Rower	Country	Time	Notes
1	Jan Schäuble	Switzerland	7:19.19	Q
2	Tyler Nase	United States	7:24.45	Q
3	Miloš Stanojević	Serbia	7:37.82	Q
4	Gary O'Donovan	Ireland	8:06.49	R
5	Richard Vanco	Slovakia	8:59.95	R

==== Heat 5 ====
Rank	Rower	Country	Time	Notes
1	Aaron Lattimer	Canada	7:14.62	Q
2	Rainer Kepplinger	Austria	7:17.40	Q
3	Eleftherios Konsolas	Greece	7:20.74	Q
4	Ask Jarl Tjøm	Norway	7:31.25	R
5	Park Hyun-su	South Korea	7:34.77	R

==== Heat 6 ====
Rank	Rower	Country	Time	Notes
1	Martino Goretti	Italy	7:10.87	Q
2	Lucas Schäfer	Germany	7:23.47	Q
3	Masahiro Takeda	Japan	7:25.97	Q
4	Jordi Orofino	Spain	7:35.56	R
5	Bruno Cetraro	Uruguay	7:43.53	R

=== Repechages ===
The two fastest boats in each repechage advanced to the quarterfinals. The remaining boats were sent to the E/F semifinals.

==== Repechage 1 ====
Rank	Rower	Country	Time	Notes
1	Chen Weichun	China	7:32.53	Q
2	Fatih Ünsal	Turkey	7:32.75	Q
3	Jordi Orofino	Spain	7:33.10	SE/F
4	Park Hyun-su	South Korea	7:47.37	SE/F
5	Shehroz Hakimov	Uzbekistan	8:04.41	SE/F

==== Repechage 2 ====
Rank	Rower	Country	Time	Notes
1	Gary O'Donovan	Ireland	7:28.07	Q
2	Uncas Batista	Brazil	7:32.97	Q
3	Filip Nilsson	Sweden	7:35.34	SE/F
4	Tibo Vyvey	Belgium	7:37.00	SE/F
5	Bruno Cetraro	Uruguay	7:42.59	SE/F

==== Repechage 3 ====
Rank	Rower	Country	Time	Notes
1	Jan Cincibuch	Czech Republic	7:25.81	Q
2	Ask Jarl Tjøm	Norway	7:35.87	Q
3	Arjun Lal Jat	India	7:39.35	SE/F
4	Dinis Costa	Portugal	7:47.50	SE/F
5	Richard Vanco	Slovakia	8:42.86	SE/F

=== Quarterfinals ===
The three fastest boats in each quarter advanced to the A/B semifinals. The remaining boats were sent to the C/D semifinals.

==== Quarterfinal 1 ====
Rank	Rower	Country	Time	Notes
1	Péter Galambos	Hungary	6:57.73	SA/B
2	Samuel Mottram	Great Britain	6:58.85	SA/B
3	Miłosz Jankowski	Poland	7:02.44	SA/B
4	Ask Jarl Tjøm	Norway	7:04.72	SC/D
5	Chen Weichun	China	7:08.90	SC/D
6	Masahiro Takeda	Japan	7:08.98	SC/D

==== Quarterfinal 2 ====
Rank	Rower	Country	Time	Notes
1	Alexis López	Mexico	6:54.59	SA/B
2	Jan Schäuble	Switzerland	6:55.59	SA/B
3	Rainer Kepplinger	Austria	6:55.96	SA/B
4	Jan Cincibuch	Czech Republic	6:58.85	SC/D
5	Uncas Batista	Brazil	7:00.49	SC/D
6	Luka Radonić	Croatia	8:11.45	SC/D

==== Quarterfinal 3 ====
Rank	Rower	Country	Time	Notes
1	Aaron Lattimer	Canada	6:56.90	SA/B
2	Sean Murphy	Australia	6:57.85	SA/B
3	Gary O'Donovan	Ireland	6:59.57	SA/B
4	Miloš Stanojević	Serbia	6:59.75	SC/D
5	Lucas Schäfer	Germany	7:03.64	SC/D
6	Benjamin van Dalen	New Zealand	7:03.68	SC/D

==== Quarterfinal 4 ====
Rank	Rower	Country	Time	Notes
1	Martino Goretti	Italy	6:53.88	SA/B
2	Tyler Nase	United States	6:58.21	SA/B
3	Fatih Ünsal	Turkey	7:00.38	SA/B
4	Eleftherios Konsolas	Greece	7:02.53	SC/D
5	Rajko Hrvat	Slovenia	7:05.94	SC/D
6	Chiu Hin Chun	Hong Kong	7:09.68	SC/D

=== Semifinals E/F ===
The three fastest boats in each semi were sent to the E final. The remaining boats were sent to the F final.

==== Semifinal 1 ====
Rank	Rower	Country	Time	Notes
1	Richard Vanco	Slovakia	7:14.06	FE
2	Jordi Orofino	Spain	7:14.17	FE
3	Tibo Vyvey	Belgium	7:15.09	FE
4	Arjun Lal Jat	India	7:16.65	FF

==== Semifinal 2 ====
Rank	Rower	Country	Time	Notes
1	Park Hyun-su	South Korea	7:07.79	FE
2	Filip Nilsson	Sweden	7:09.99	FE
3	Bruno Cetraro	Uruguay	7:11.98	FE
4	Dinis Costa	Portugal	7:14.56	FF
5	Shehroz Hakimov	Uzbekistan	7:25.65	FF

=== Semifinals C/D ===
The three fastest boats in each semi were sent to the C final. The remaining boats were sent to the D final.

==== Semifinal 1 ====
Rank	Rower	Country	Time	Notes
1	Rajko Hrvat	Slovenia	6:55.17	FC
2	Lucas Schäfer	Germany	6:56.73	FC
3	Masahiro Takeda	Japan	6:57.04	FC
4	Jan Cincibuch	Czech Republic	6:59.07	FD
5	Ask Jarl Tjøm	Norway	6:59.18	FD
6	Benjamin van Dalen	New Zealand	7:08.22	FD

==== Semifinal 2 ====
Rank	Rower	Country	Time	Notes
1	Uncas Batista	Brazil	6:59.48	FC
2	Luka Radonić	Croatia	7:01.69	FC
3	Miloš Stanojević	Serbia	7:01.81	FC
4	Chiu Hin Chun	Hong Kong	7:03.79	FD
5	Eleftherios Konsolas	Greece	7:12.18	FD
6	Chen Weichun	China	7:13.27	FD

=== Semifinals A/B ===
The three fastest boats in each semi advanced to the A final. The remaining boats were sent to the B final.

==== Semifinal 1 ====
Rank	Rower	Country	Time	Notes
1	Martino Goretti	Italy	6:49.44	FA
2	Sean Murphy	Australia	6:51.35	FA
3	Péter Galambos	Hungary	6:52.12	FA
4	Miłosz Jankowski	Poland	6:56.33	FB
5	Jan Schäuble	Switzerland	7:06.22	FB
6	Gary O'Donovan	Ireland	7:34.01	FB

==== Semifinal 2 ====
Rank	Rower	Country	Time	Notes
1	Alexis López	Mexico	6:51.03	FA
2	Samuel Mottram	Great Britain	6:51.44	FA
3	Aaron Lattimer	Canada	6:52.72	FA
4	Rainer Kepplinger	Austria	6:54.45	FB
5	Fatih Ünsal	Turkey	6:58.80	FB
6	Tyler Nase	United States	7:01.75	FB

=== Finals ===
The A final determined the rankings for places 1 to 6. Additional rankings were determined in the other finals.

==== Final F ====
Rank	Rower	Country	Time
1	Arjun Lal Jat	India	7:06.89
2	Dinis Costa	Portugal	7:07.27
3	Shehroz Hakimov	Uzbekistan	7:16.34

==== Final E ====
Rank	Rower	Country	Time
1	Park Hyun-su	South Korea	6:59.56
2	Richard Vanco	Slovakia	7:03.41
3	Jordi Orofino	Spain	7:04.57
4	Tibo Vyvey	Belgium	7:04.61
5	Filip Nilsson	Sweden	7:07.38
6	Bruno Cetraro	Uruguay	7:09.92

==== Final D ====
Rank	Rower	Country	Time
1	Benjamin van Dalen	New Zealand	7:10.82
2	Eleftherios Konsolas	Greece	7:11.29
3	Jan Cincibuch	Czech Republic	7:11.64
4	Ask Jarl Tjøm	Norway	7:14.12
5	Chiu Hin Chun	Hong Kong	7:16.61
6	Chen Weichun	China	7:20.70

==== Final C ====
Rank	Rower	Country	Time
1	Rajko Hrvat	Slovenia	7:04.58
2	Lucas Schäfer	Germany	7:06.98
3	Uncas Batista	Brazil	7:08.03
4	Miloš Stanojević	Serbia	7:10.42
5	Luka Radonić	Croatia	7:11.21
6	Masahiro Takeda	Japan	7:12.42

==== Final B ====
Rank	Rower	Country	Time
1	Rainer Kepplinger	Austria	7:00.16
2	Miłosz Jankowski	Poland	7:01.24
3	Tyler Nase	United States	7:01.35
4	Gary O'Donovan	Ireland	7:02.18
5	Jan Schäuble	Switzerland	7:02.28
6	Fatih Ünsal	Turkey	7:15.62

==== Final A ====
Rank	Rower	Country	Time
1st place, gold medalist(s)	Martino Goretti	Italy	6:59.48
2nd place, silver medalist(s)	Péter Galambos	Hungary	7:02.37
3rd place, bronze medalist(s)	Sean Murphy	Australia	7:04.55
4	Alexis López	Mexico	7:05.22
5	Samuel Mottram	Great Britain	7:05.39
6	Aaron Lattimer	Canada	7:13.81
