= Miloš Stanojević =

Miloš Stanojević may refer to:

- Miloš Stanojević (rower) (born 1984), Serbian rower
- Miloš Stanojević (footballer) (born 1993), Serbian footballer
