= Piešťany Military History Museum =

Military museum in Slovakia

Military History Museum Piešťany
- Vojenské historické múzeum Piešťany
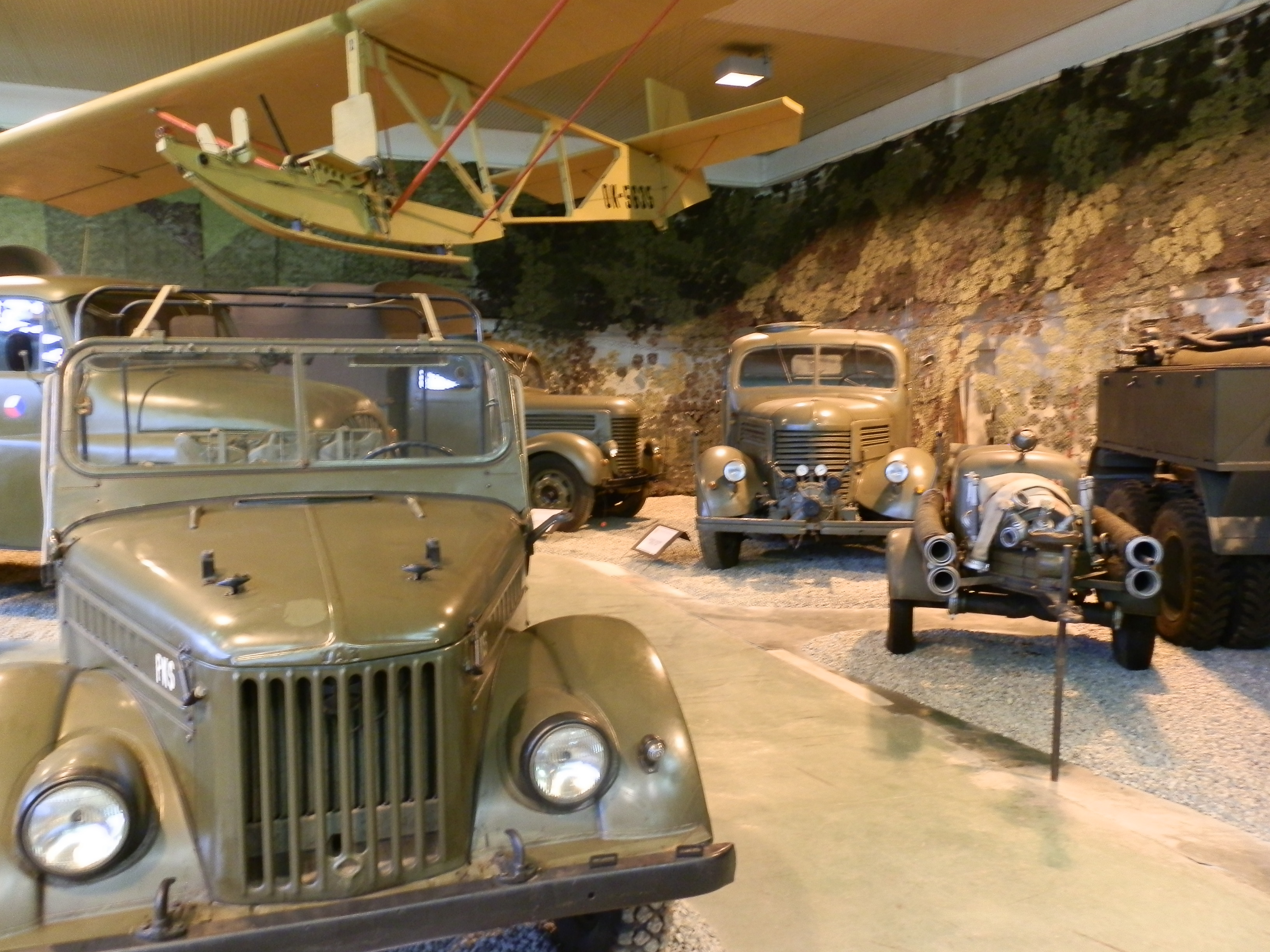
- Gallery view
- Established: 2004
- Location: Piešťany Airport, Piešťany, Slovakia
- Coordinates: 48.6080°N 17.8289°E
- Type: Military museum
- Collection size: 10,108
- Website: Piestany Military History Museum

Piešťany Military History Museum (Slovak: Vojenské historické múzeum Piešťany, abbreviation VHM Piešťany) is a military museum in Piešťany, Slovakia. It is located at Piešťany Airport in buildings that used to be a military base. The museum contains aircraft and vehicles of the Czechoslovak army from 1945 to 1992. The museum is 41,000 square meters.

The museum is part of the Institute of Military History of Bratislava, which was created in 1994 from the Ministry of Defense of Slovakia. It was originally headquartered in Trenčín but moved to Piešťany in 2004.

Construction of the museum started in 2002 and opened to the public in 2004. From 2002 to 2004, military equipment from other nearby museums arrived in Piešťany. In 2021, a second exhibition, called "Slovaks in Uniform 1848–2020" was inaugurated.

The museum is undergoing reconstruction in 2023, which will redevelop the entire museum. It will also add another exhibition, named "Military History of Slovakia after 1945". The reconstruction is due to finish in 2026.

As of 31 December 2024, the Piešťany Museum Department registered 10,108 items in the museum, which are part of 22 museum collections.

The museum has three halls. The first hall presents military equipment of the Czechoslovak army during 1945–1992. The second hall has light armored vehicles, and the third hall includes heavy tracked vehicles.

== Photographs ==
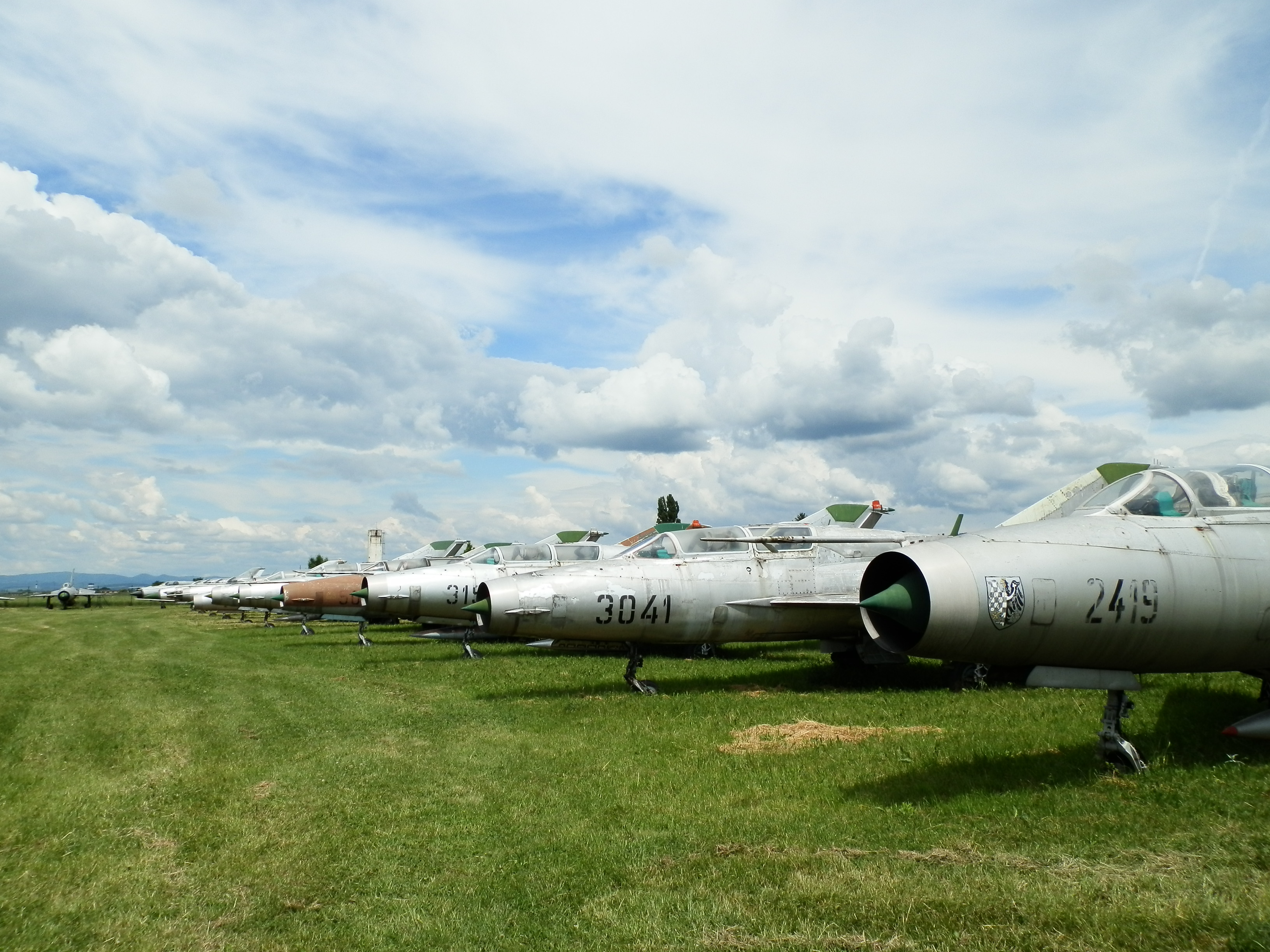
Outdoor exposition of aircraft, various MiG-21 fighters

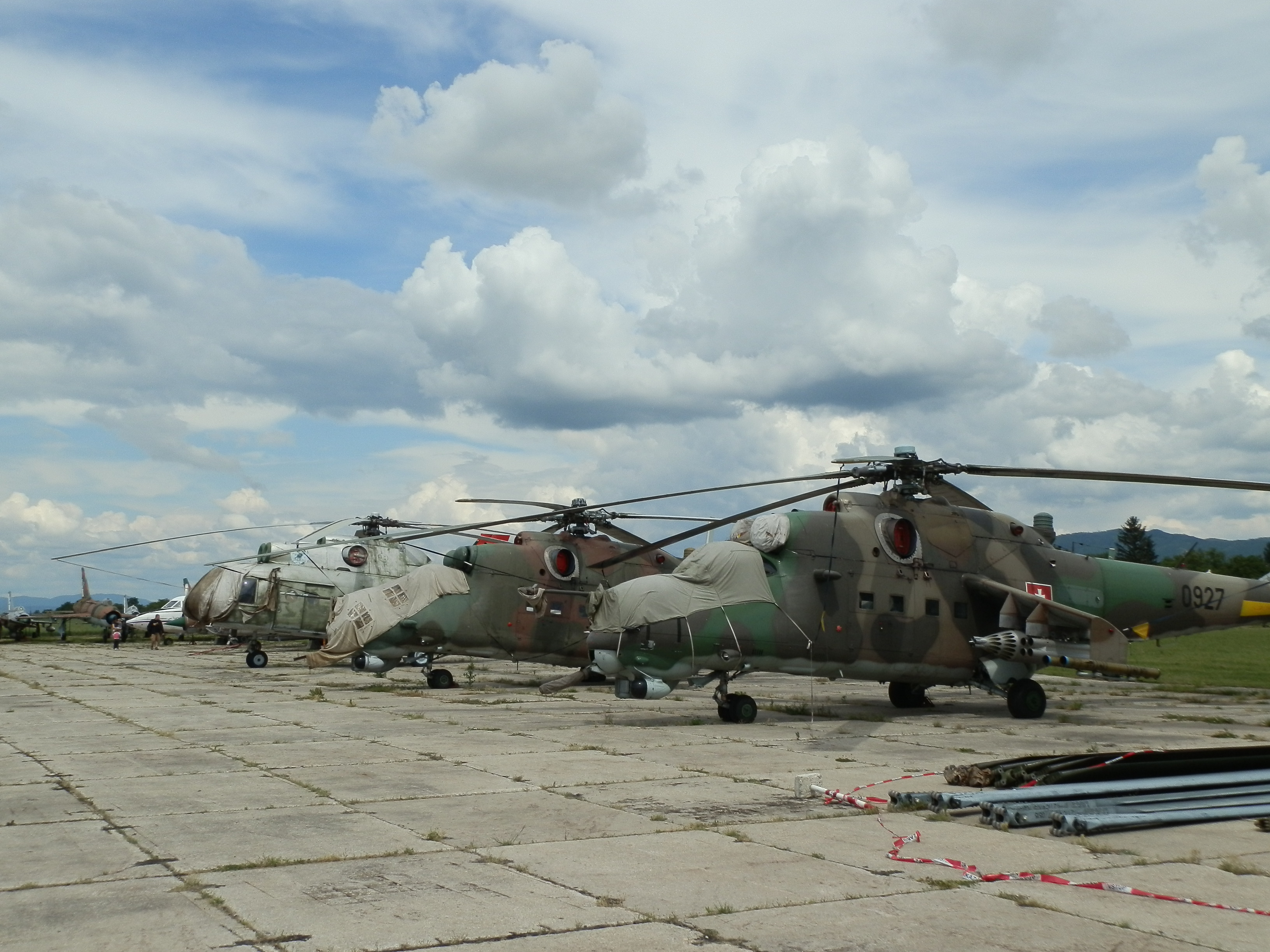
Outdoor exposition of helicopters, Mi-24 and Mi-17

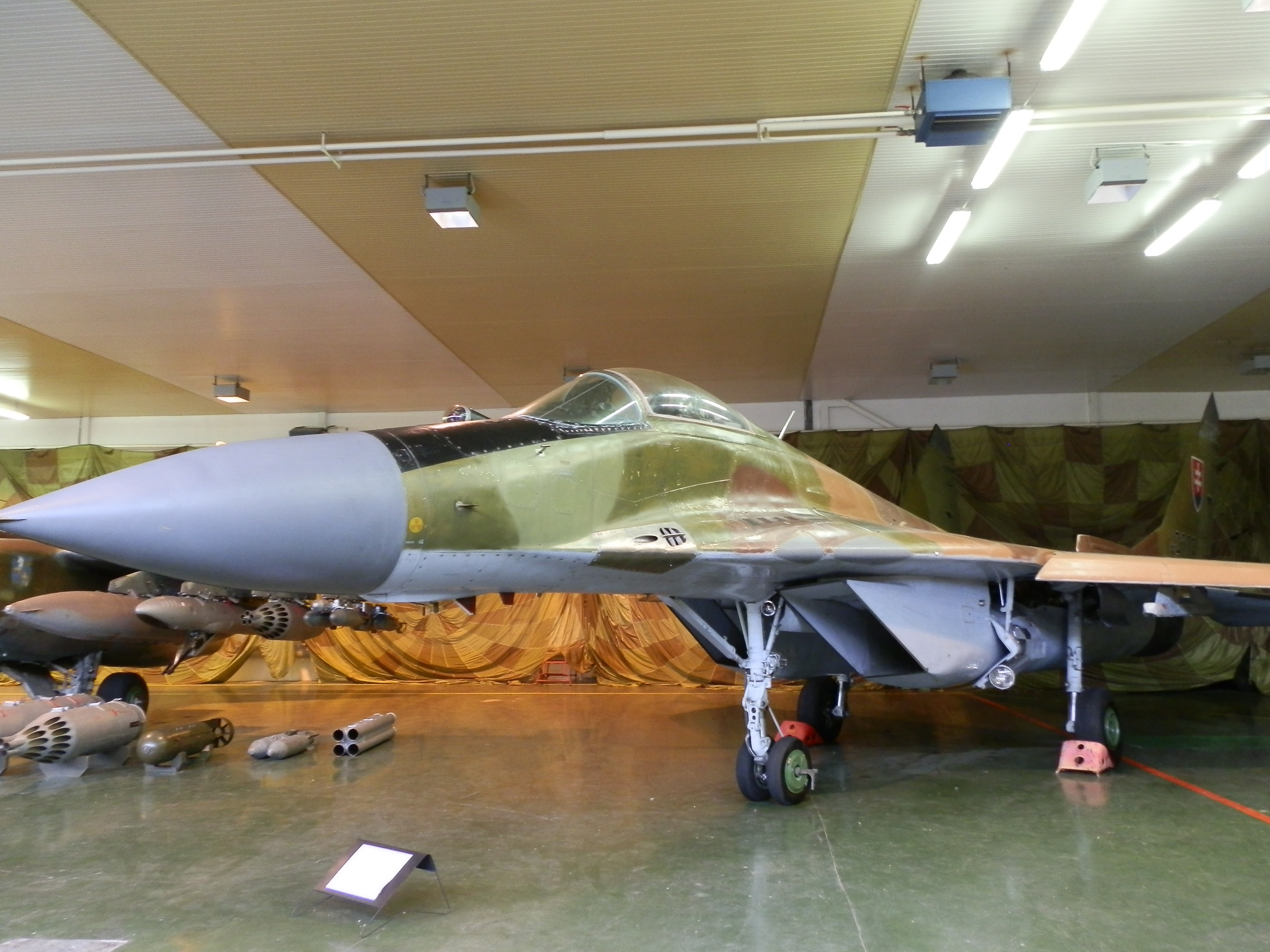
MiG-29 fighter, Museum in Piešťany has several aircraft of this type

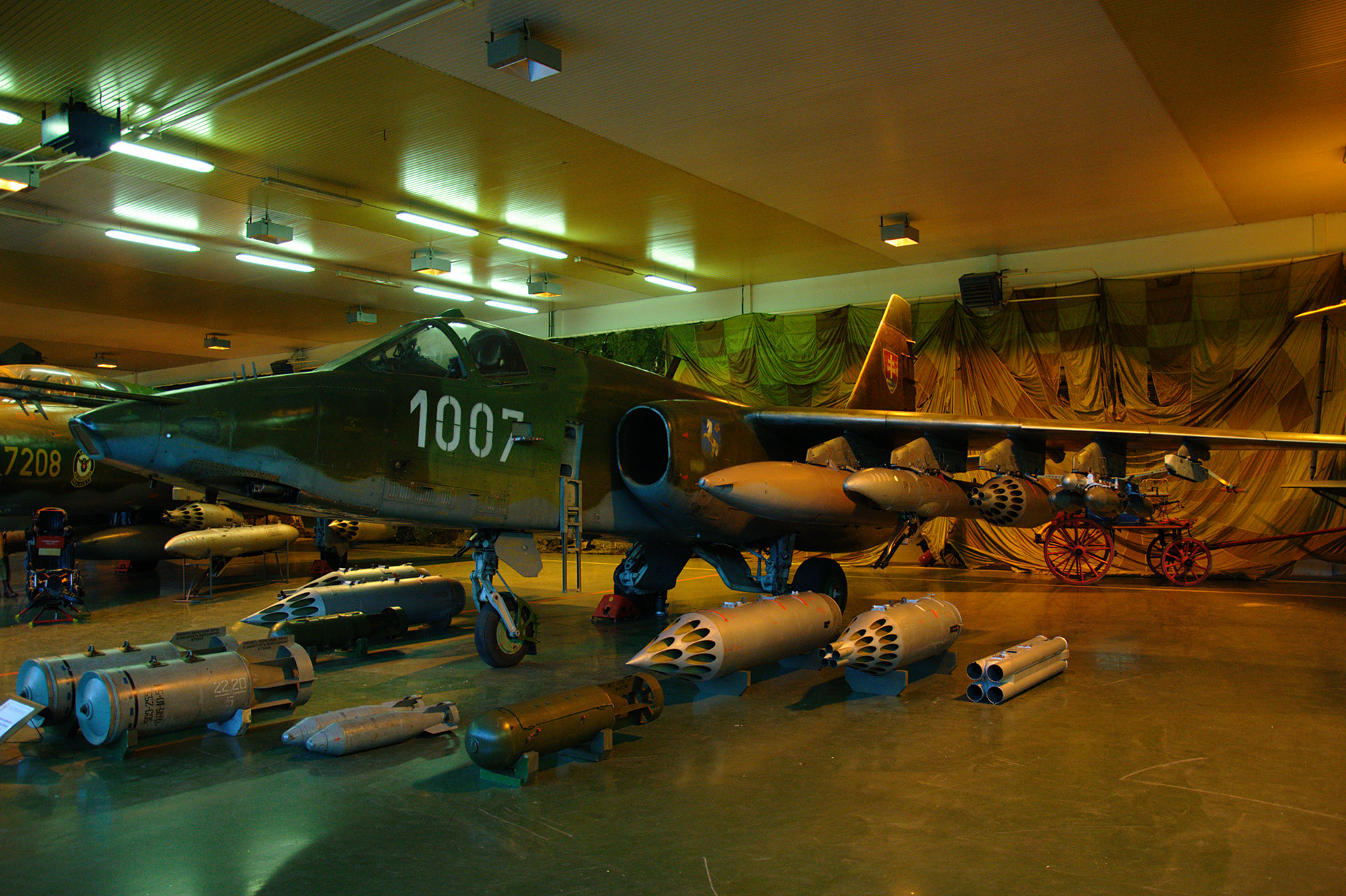
Su-25 aircraft with armament

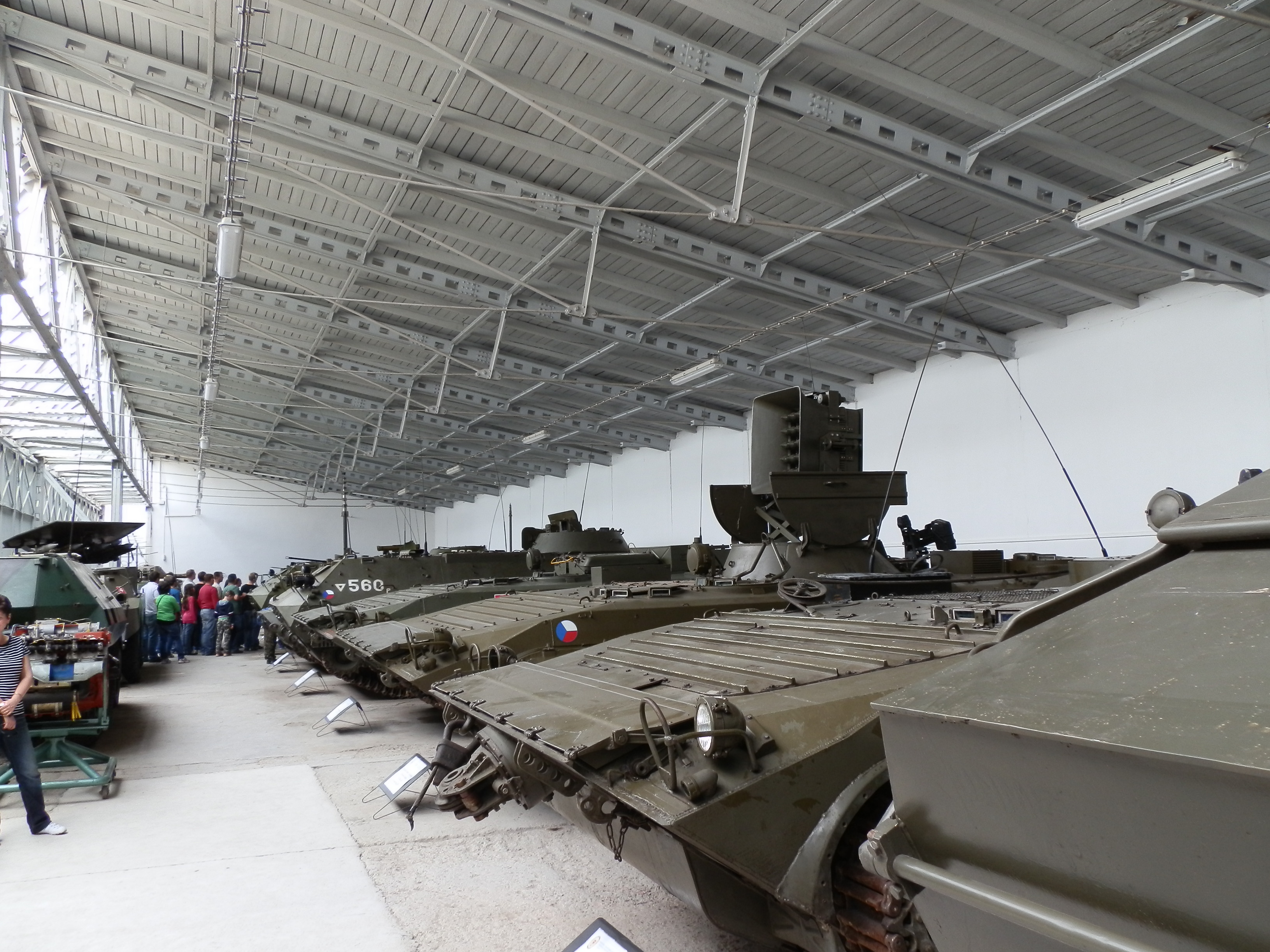
Exposition of IFV vehicles

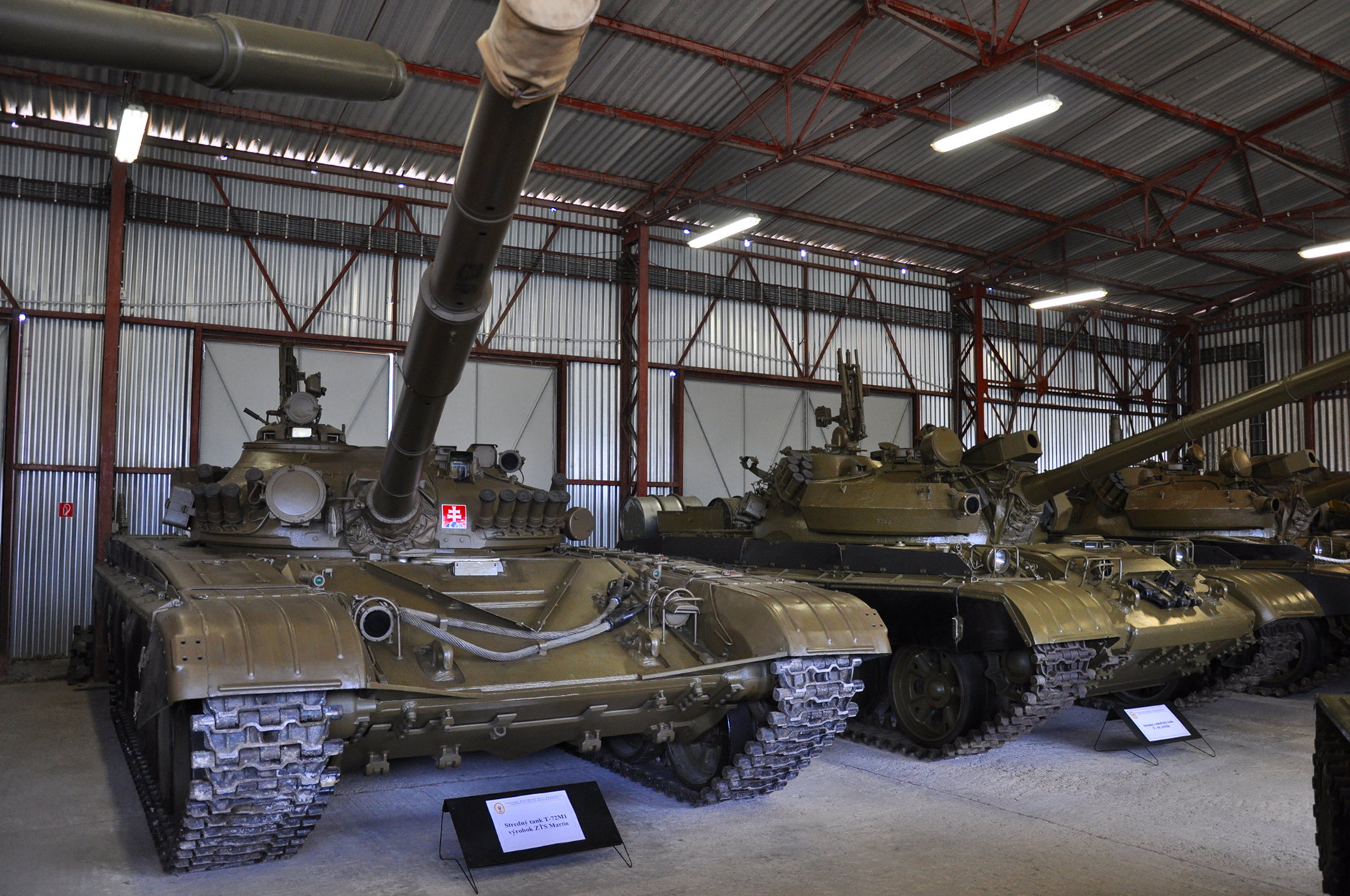
Exposition on tanks, T-72 and T-55AM2

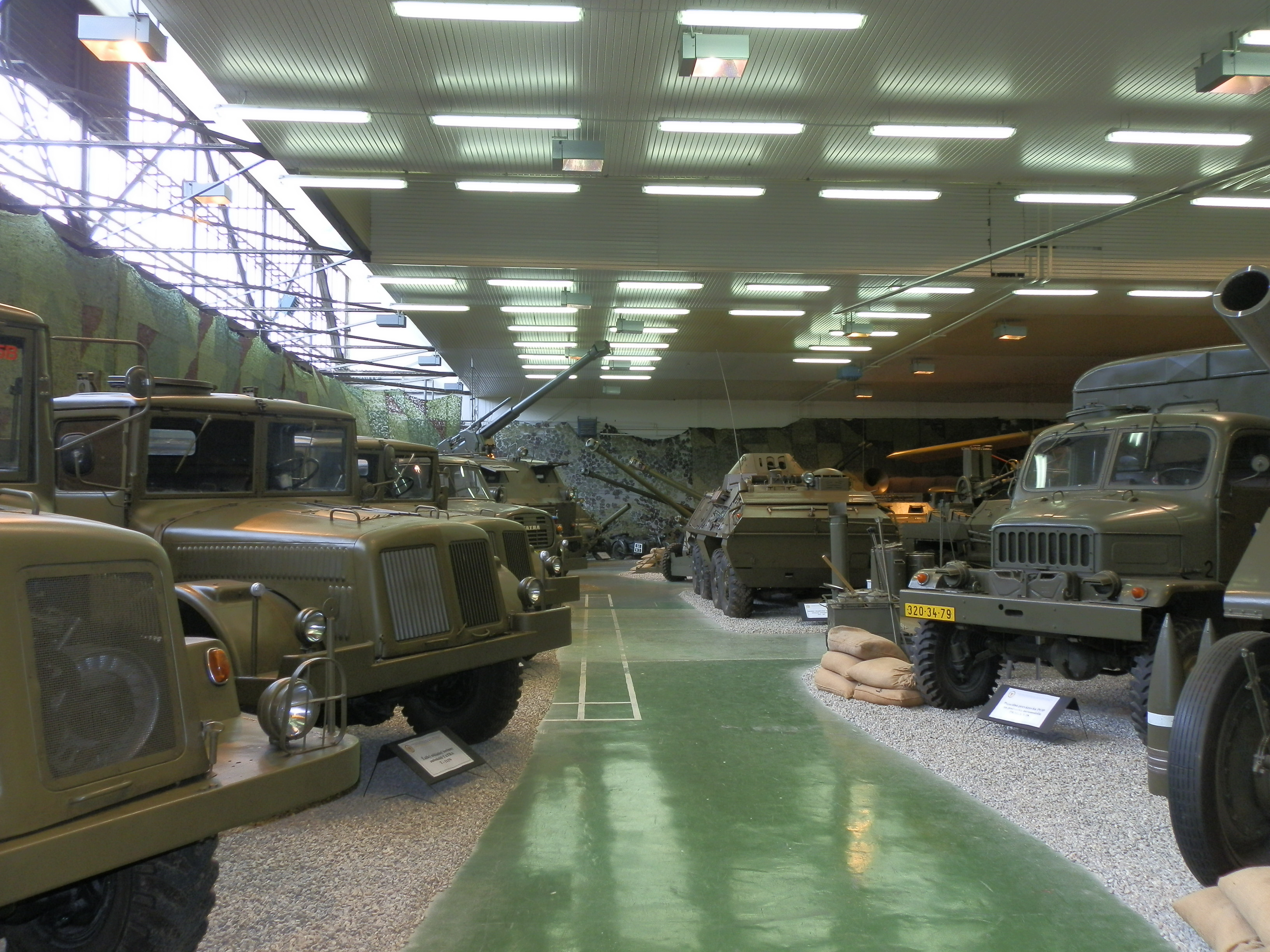
Exposition of military trucks

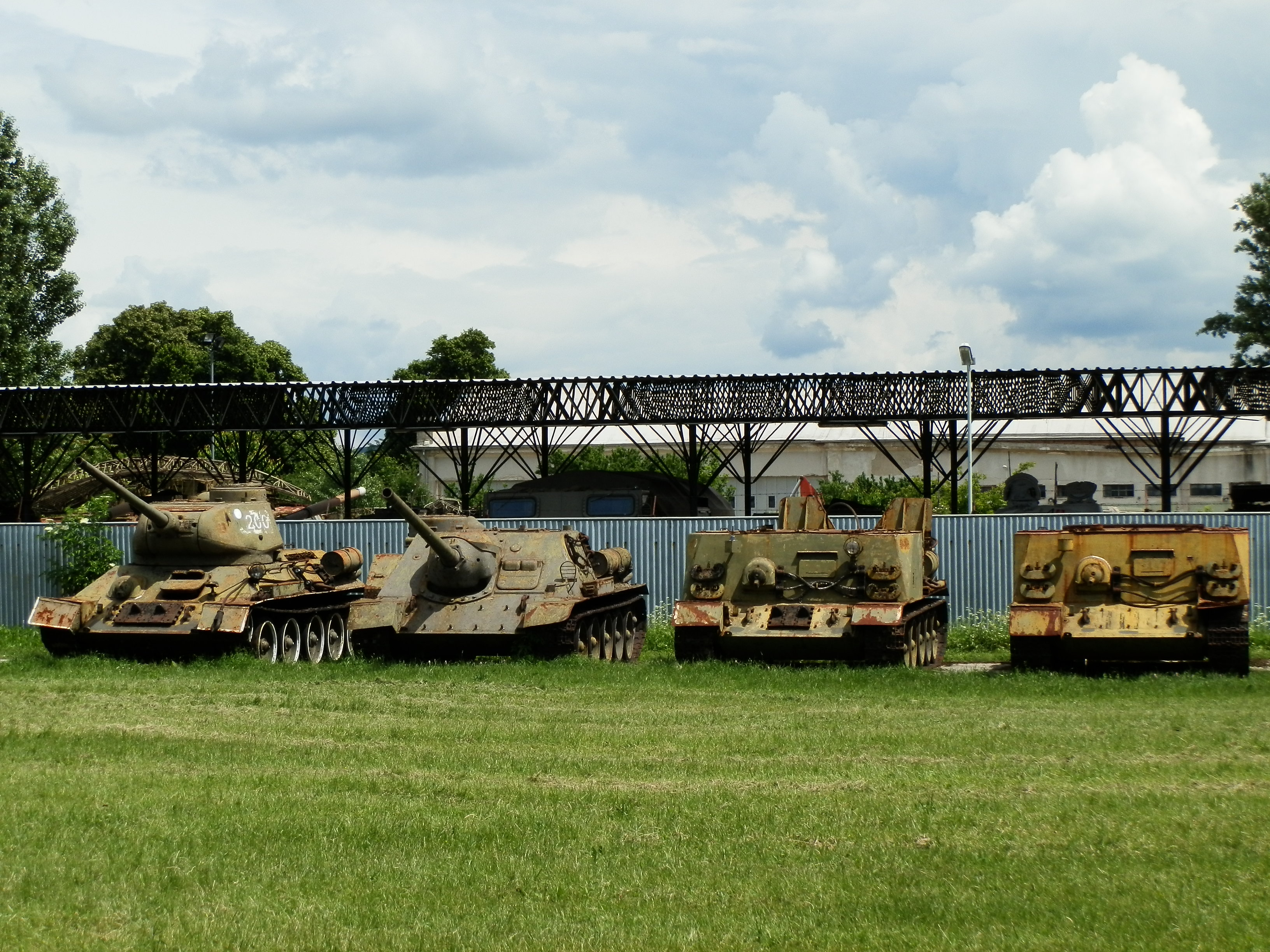
Exposition of vehicles on T-34 chassis
