= Lukáš Babač =

Slovak rower (born 1985)

Lukáš Babáč
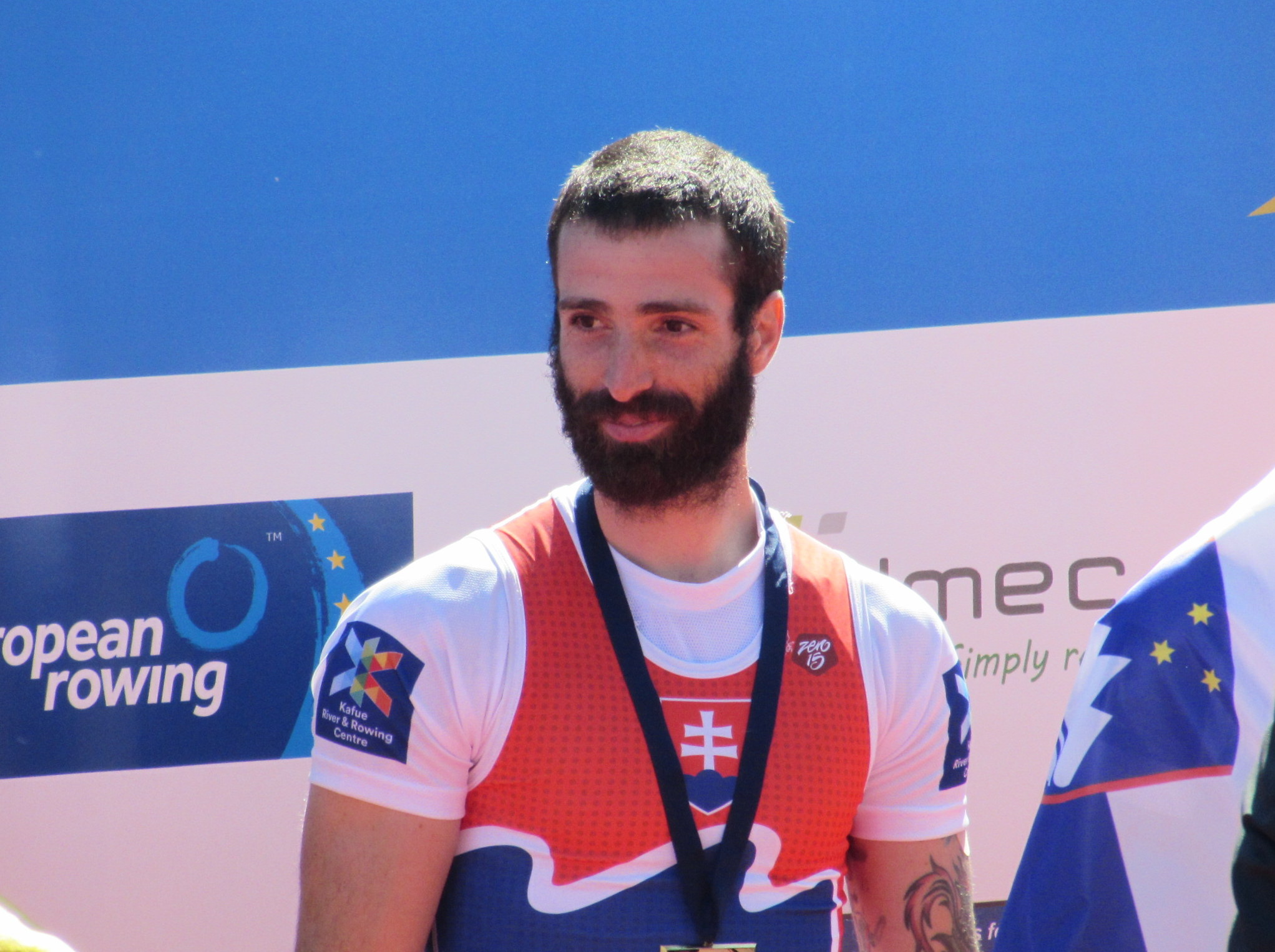
- Babač at the 2016 European Championships

Personal information
- Born: 20 March 1985 (age 41) Piešťany, Slovakia
- Height: 183 cm (6 ft 0 in)
- Weight: 70 kg (154 lb)

Sport
- Sport: Rowing
Medal record
Men's rowing
Representing Slovakia
World Championships
Silver medal – second place	2010 Karapiro	Lwt single sculls
Bronze medal – third place	2016 Rotterdam	Lwt single sculls
European Championships
Gold medal – first place	2016 Brandenburg	Lwt single sculls
Silver medal – second place	2008 Athens	Single sculls
Silver medal – second place	2015 Poznań	Lwt single sculls
Bronze medal – third place	2010 Montemor-o-Velho	Lwt single sculls

Lukáš Babač (born 20 March 1985) is a Slovak rower.

Born in Piešťany, Slovakia, he started to row at age 12. After 4th place at the World Rowing Junior Championships he qualified for 2004 Olympic Games. At the 2004 he was the youngest member of the Slovak Olympic Team. His best result was silver medal at the World Rowing Championships in 2010 in New Zealand. He also has a silver medal form World Rowing U23 Championships in 2005, 2 silver medals from European Rowing Championships and he is an Academic World Champion, all in LM1x (lightweight men's single sculls). He won 2 FISA World cup races in Bled and Lucern 2015. In 2016 Babač become the European Champion at the European Rowing Championships in Brandenburg. His coach is Dr. Vaclav Kacíř.

After ending his career as a rower, he started cycling in a "Cyklisti Trnava" semi-professional cycling club.
