= Roman Catholic Church in Piešťany =

Roman Catholic church in Piešťany, Slovakia

Coordinates: 48.6019°N 17.8328°E

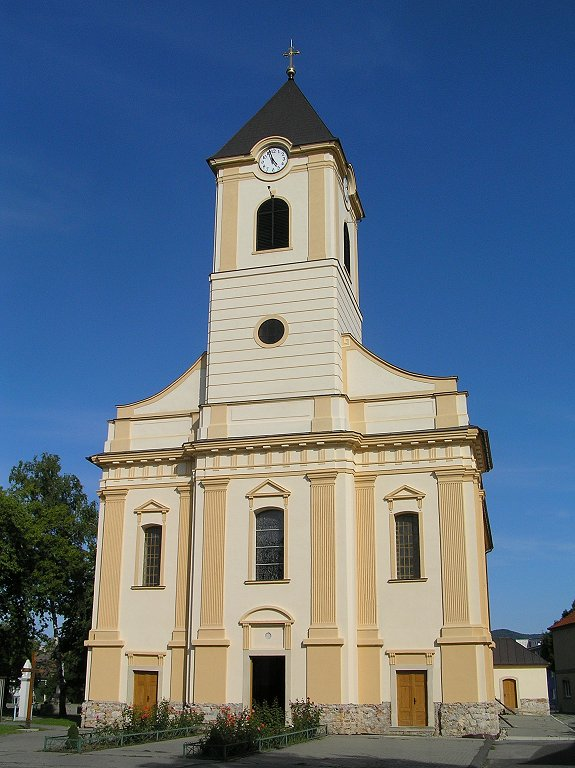

The Roman Catholic Church in Piešťany, dedicated to St. Stephen, is in the old town of Piešťany, Slovakia and is a national cultural monument. The first mention of the Roman Catholic parish and church is from the year 1332. The current church was built between 1828 and 1832 in a classic Empire style.
