= Martino Goretti =

Italian rower (born 1985)

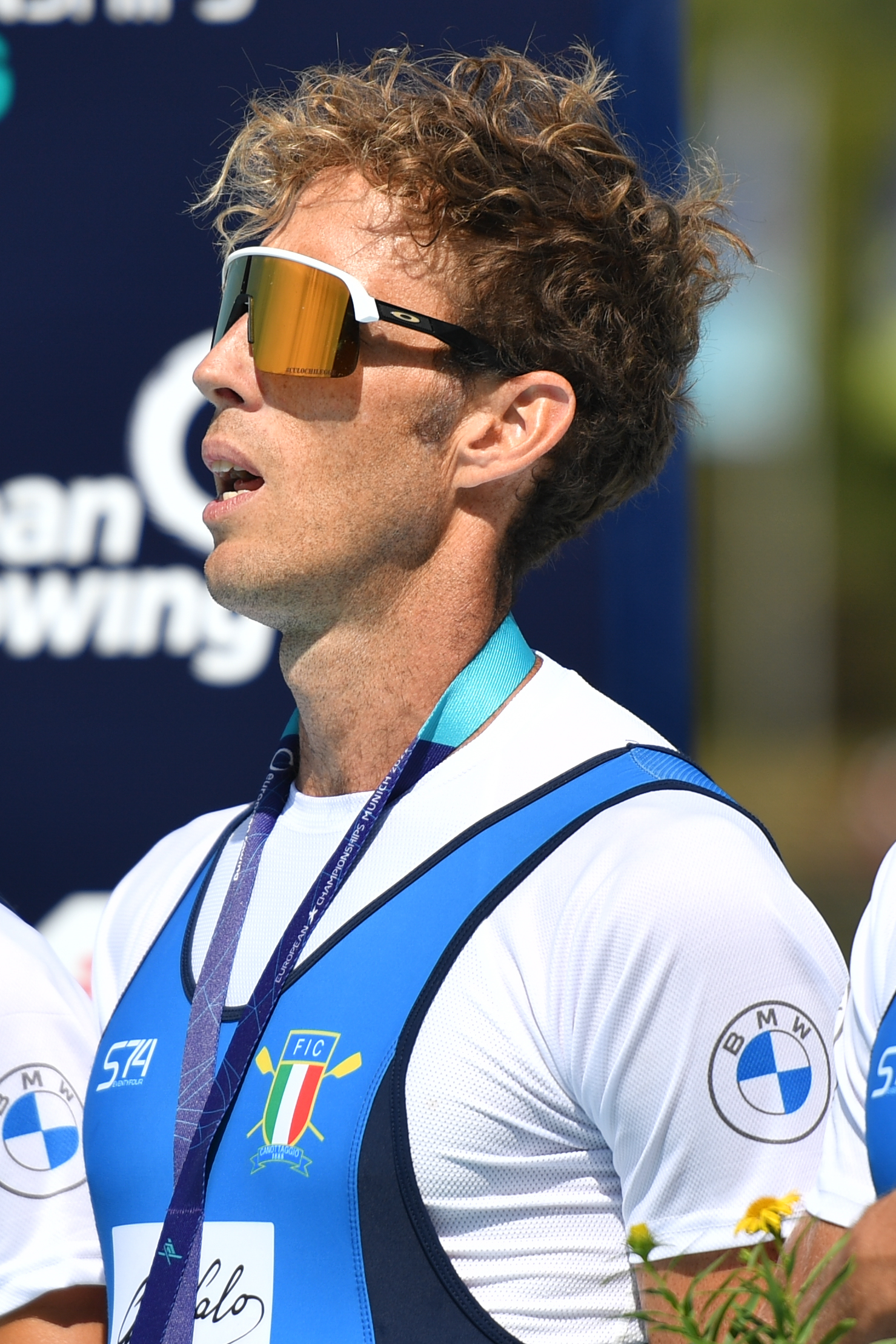
- Martino Goretti in 2022

Personal information
- Nationality: Italian
- Born: 27 September 1985 (age 40) Lecco, Italy
- Height: 1.86 m (6 ft 1 in)
- Weight: 72 kg (159 lb)

Sport
- Country: Italy
- Sport: Rowing
- Events: Quadruple sculls; Lightweight single sculls; Lightweight coxless four; Lightweight eight
- Club: Fiamme Oro GS

Achievements and titles
- Olympic finals: Rio 2016
Medal record
Senior level
Event	1st	2nd	3rd
World Championships	4	3	1
European Championships	4	2	1
Total	8	5	2
World Championships
Gold medal – first place	2005 Gifu	Lwt eight
Gold medal – first place	2006 Eton	Lwt eight
Gold medal – first place	2009 Poznań	Lwt eight
Gold medal – first place	2019 Ottensheim	Lwt single sculls
Silver medal – second place	2011 Bled	Lwt coxless four
Silver medal – second place	2012 Plovdiv	Lwt eight
Silver medal – second place	2013 Chungju	Lwt coxless pair
Bronze medal – third place	2005 Gifu	Lwt coxless four
European Championships
Gold medal – first place	2011 Plovdiv	Lwt coxless four
Gold medal – first place	2012 Varese	Lwt coxless four
Gold medal – first place	2021 Varese	Quadruple sculls
Gold medal – first place	2022 Munich	Quadruple sculls
Silver medal – second place	2017 Račice	Lwt coxless four
Silver medal – second place	2018 Glasgow	Lwt single sculls
Bronze medal – third place	2019 Lucerne	Lwt single sculls

Martino Goretti (born 27 September 1985) is an Italian representative lightweight rower, a world champion and a dual Olympian. He has represented at senior World Rowing Championships and World Rowing Cups consistently from 2005 to 2019. He is a four time world champion at the senior level who won three titles in Italian lightweight eights from 2005 to 2009 and then in 2019 won the lightweight single scull world title. He had previously won underage world championships as a junior and an U23.

== International representative rowing ==
=== Early career ===
Goretti's international representative debut for Italy was in 2003 when he was selected in the coxless four to compete at the 2003 World Junior Rowing Championships in Athens. That crew won gold and a world junior title. The following year he competed in the Italian lightweight coxless four at the World Rowing U23 Championships in Poznan and won silver.

In 2005 Goretti broke into the Italian senior lightweight squad. He raced in the lightweight coxless four at the World Rowing Cup II in Munich and then was seated in the Italian lightweight eight when they won gold at the WRC III in Lucerne. He remained in the eight for the 2005 World Rowing Championships in Gifu where the Italian's took the world championship title. At the U23 World Championships in Amsterdam that year he stroked the Italian lightweight U23 coxless four to a bronze medal. Goretti and four other members of the world champion lightweight eight stayed together into 2006. They took gold at the World Rowing Cup III in Lucerne and then successfully defended their world championship title at the 2006 World Rowing Championships at Eton Dorney. Goretti and the other eligible U23 members of the eight raced as a coxless four at the World Rowing U23 Championships that year in Hazewinkel and won gold as a four.

In 2007 Goretti was in the Italian lightweight eight when they took silver at the World Rowing Cup III in Lucerne, but he was not retained in the crew for their bronze-medal winning campaign at the World Championships in Munich. He was selected in the Italian coxless four who finished fifth at the U23 World Championships in Glasgow. Those circumstances repeated in 2008 when Goretti won a gold medal in the Italian lightweight eight at the World Cup III in Poznan but was not selected for the 2008 World Rowing Championships. In 2009 Goretti stroked half of the lightweight eight when they raced as coxless fours at the WRC I in Banyoles and was back in the eight for their silver medal win at WRC III in Lucerne and then continuing to the 2009 World Rowing Championships in Poznan. With Goretti in the four seat the Italian lightweight eight rowed to a gold medal, the third world championship title of Goretti's career.

=== 2010 to present ===
2010 saw Goretti secure the stroke seat in the Italian lightweight coxless four as they prepared their long lead up campaign for the 2012 London Olympics where the lightweight 4- would be contested. In 2010 they raced at the World Rowing Cup I in Bled (bronze), the WRC III in Lucerne (bronze), the European Championships (fourth) and at the 2010 World Championships in New Zealand to an overall sixth place finish. He led that same crew throughout 2011 when they won silver at the WRC III, gold at the European Championships, and silver at the 2011 World Rowing Championships in Bled. In the Olympic year of 2012, Italy's lightweight coxless four with Goretti at stroke, found themselves out of top contention. They placed twelfth at the WRC I and seventh at WRC II and then at the London Olympics the Italian lightweight four rowed consistently to that form and finished in overall twelfth place. The Italian lightweights had better luck in the non-Olympic eights event at the 2012 World Rowing Championships in Plovdiv where they took the silver medal with Goretti rowing in the six seat.

Goretti rowed on in Italian lightweights sweep crews after the 2012 Olympics. He stroked a lightweight pair to a silver medal at the 2013 World Championships in Chungju and then in 2014 he was back in the coxless four which contested all the European World Rowing Cups, European Championships and the World Championships. At the World Rowing Championships of 2014 and 2015 Italian lightweight coxless fours with Goretti rowing at bow finished respectively twelfth and sixth. Their 2016 campaign in the run down to the 2016 Rio Olympics saw them out of medal contention in two World Rowing Cups but in Rio they showed better form winning their heat and semi-final and holding down third spot at the first two 500m marks of the final only to be rowed down by France and finishing in fourth place and off the medal podium.

In 2017 saw Goretti now aged 31, make the switch form sweep-oared to sculling boats. He was selected in the Italian lightweight quad scull which placed fourth at the 2017 World Rowing Championships in Sarasota and then in 2018 he moved into a single scull. He took silver at the European Championships and finished in seventh place at the 2018 World Rowing Championships. In 2019 he timed his World Championships campaign to perfection, taking a silver at the European Championships, taking fifth place at the WRC II and then at the World Championships in Ottensheim Goretti was unbeaten in the three preliminary races and then led in the final from start to finish to win his fourth career world championship title and his first as a single scull boatman. Goretti is well known for his willingness to try new innovations and the 2019 World Championships was no different. Goretti was the first to use the Randall Foil blade design at an international level. The hydrofoil blade design was first introduced by Ian Randall at the 2018 FISA International Coaches Conference, Berlin.
