= Emil Belluš =

Czechoslovak architect

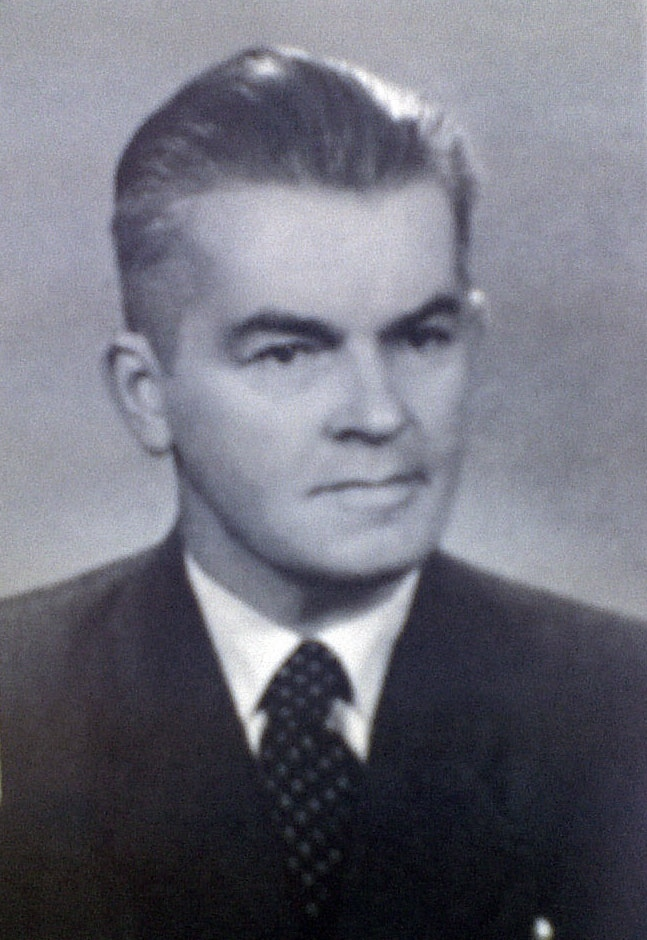
- Born: 19 September 1899; Slovenská Ľupča, Upper Hungary
- Died: 14 December 1979 (aged 80); Bratislava, Czechoslovakia
- Education: Czech Technical University in Prague
- Occupation: Architect
- Buildings: Slovak National Bank, Bratislava (1938) Water tank tower, Trnava (1946) Building of Faculty of Architecture of Slovak University of Technology in Bratislava, Bratislava (1952)
- Projects: Colonnade Bridge, Piešťany (1932)

Emil Belluš (19 September 1899 – 14 December 1979) was a Slovak functionalist architect.

== Career ==
Emil Belluš began his studies at the Technical University in Budapest in 1918, but completed them at the Czech Technical University in Prague in 1923. He then returned to Slovakia where he became a founding member of the Association of Slovak Artists (later the Slovak Architects Society, of which he was president from 1945 to 1953) and of the Slovak Rowing Club. He designed the clubhouse for the rowing club.

While working in an international functionalist style, he was willing to modify it with classical elements, as can be seen in the Colonnade Bridge at Piešťany completed in 1932.

His design for the head office of the Slovak National Bank (1938) showed the influence of Italian Rationalism.

The annual architectural award of the Slovak Architects Society is named the Emil Belluš Prize in his memory.

== Buildings ==
- National House, Banská Bystrica (1925)
- Flour Mill, Trnava (1936)
- Slovak National Bank, Bratislava (1938)
- Trnava Water-Works (1946)
- Slovak Rowing Club, Bratislava (1931)
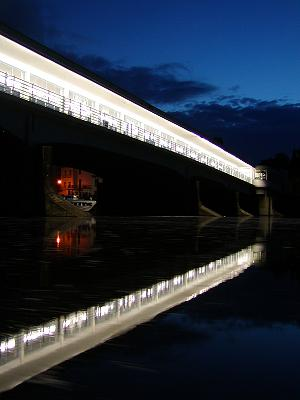
Functionalist Kolonádový most (Piešťany), 1930-33

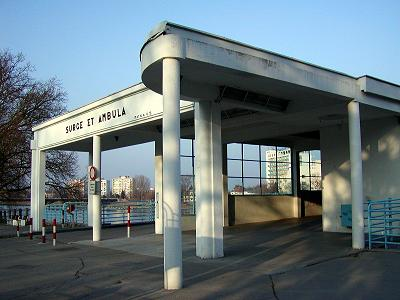
The entrance to the covered bridge in Piešťany, designed by Belluš 1930–31, completed 1932

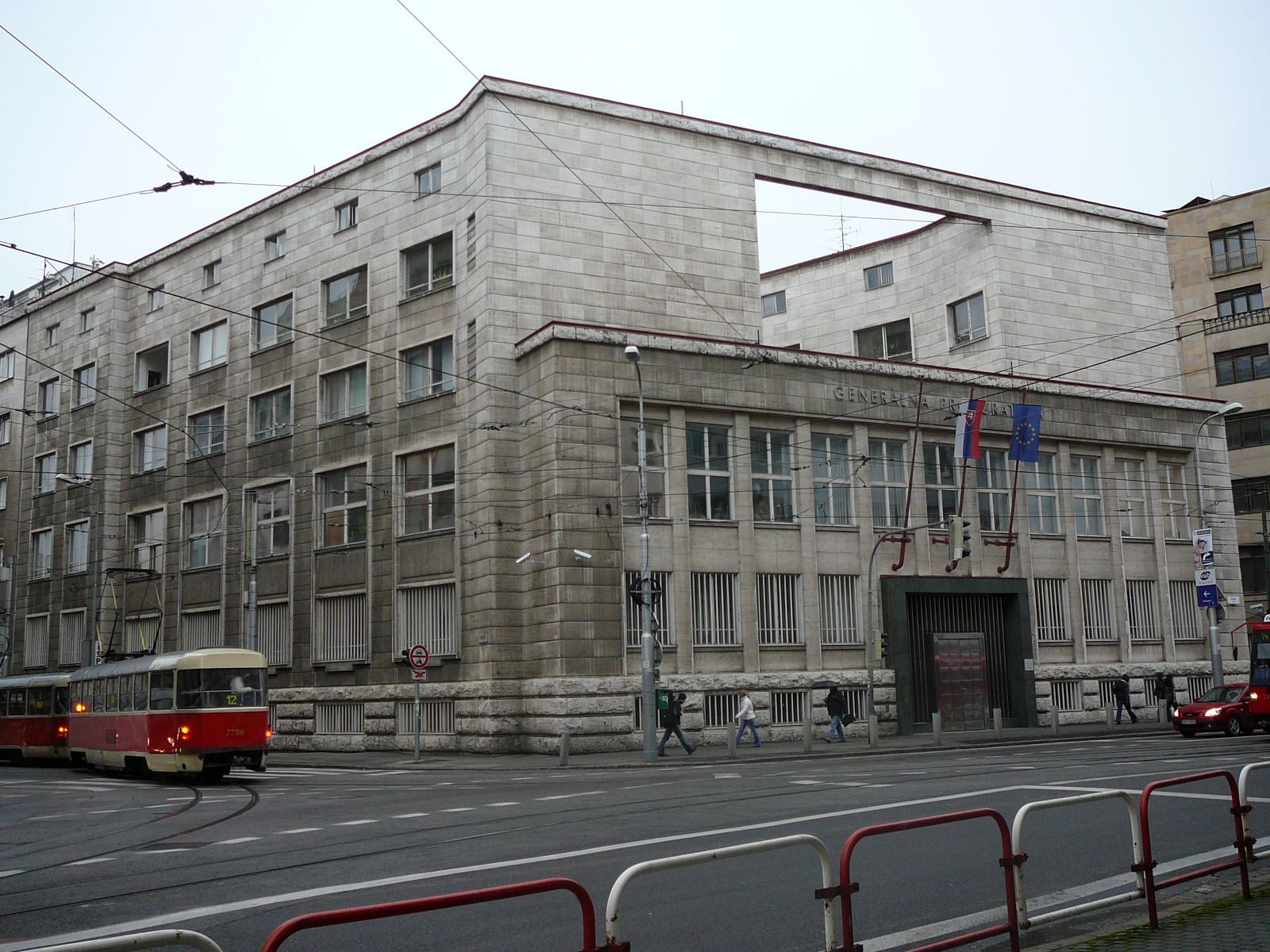
Head office of the Slovak National Bank,1938

== Works on Belluš ==
- Martin Kusý, Emil Belluš. Bratislava: Tatran, 1984.
- Emil Belluš: Architektonické dielo, exhibition catalogue. Bratislava: Slovak National Gallery, 1989.
- Architekt Emil Belluš, regionálna moderna, exhibition catalogue. Bratislava: Spolok architektov Slovenska (Slovak Architects Society), 1992.
