= Kolonádový most (Piešťany) =

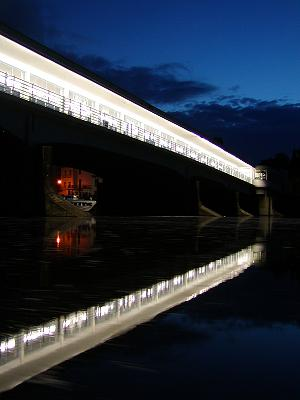
- The Colonnade Bridge at night
- Coordinates: 48°35′17″N 17°50′24″E
- Crosses: Váh
- Locale: Piešťany
- Official name: Kolonádový most

History
- Designer: Emil Belluš
- Opened: 1933; 92 years ago 30 December 1956; 68 years ago

Location
- Interactive map of Kolonádový most

Kolonádový most (literally The Colonnade Bridge) is a bridge over the Váh river in Piešťany. It connects the town to the Spa Island.

The bridge was designed by architect Emil Belluš in 1930–33, in Streamline Moderne, an international style of Art Deco architecture that emerged in the 1930s. The center of the bridge features glass engravings by a well-known artist Martin Benka titled "Detva Songs" and "At Sheepcote". The western entrance of the bridge features an inscription in Classical Latin: "Saluberrimae Pistinienses Thermae" (The healing Piešťany Spa) and the eastern entrance features the spa's motto "Surge et ambula" (Get up and walk). The "Crutch Breaker" statue and the symbol of the spa, stands at the western entrance. The sculpture is the work of the Academic Sculptor Robert Kuhmayer (created in 1934). The bridge was destroyed in 1945 by the retreating German army; after reconstruction it was re-opened on 30 December 1956.

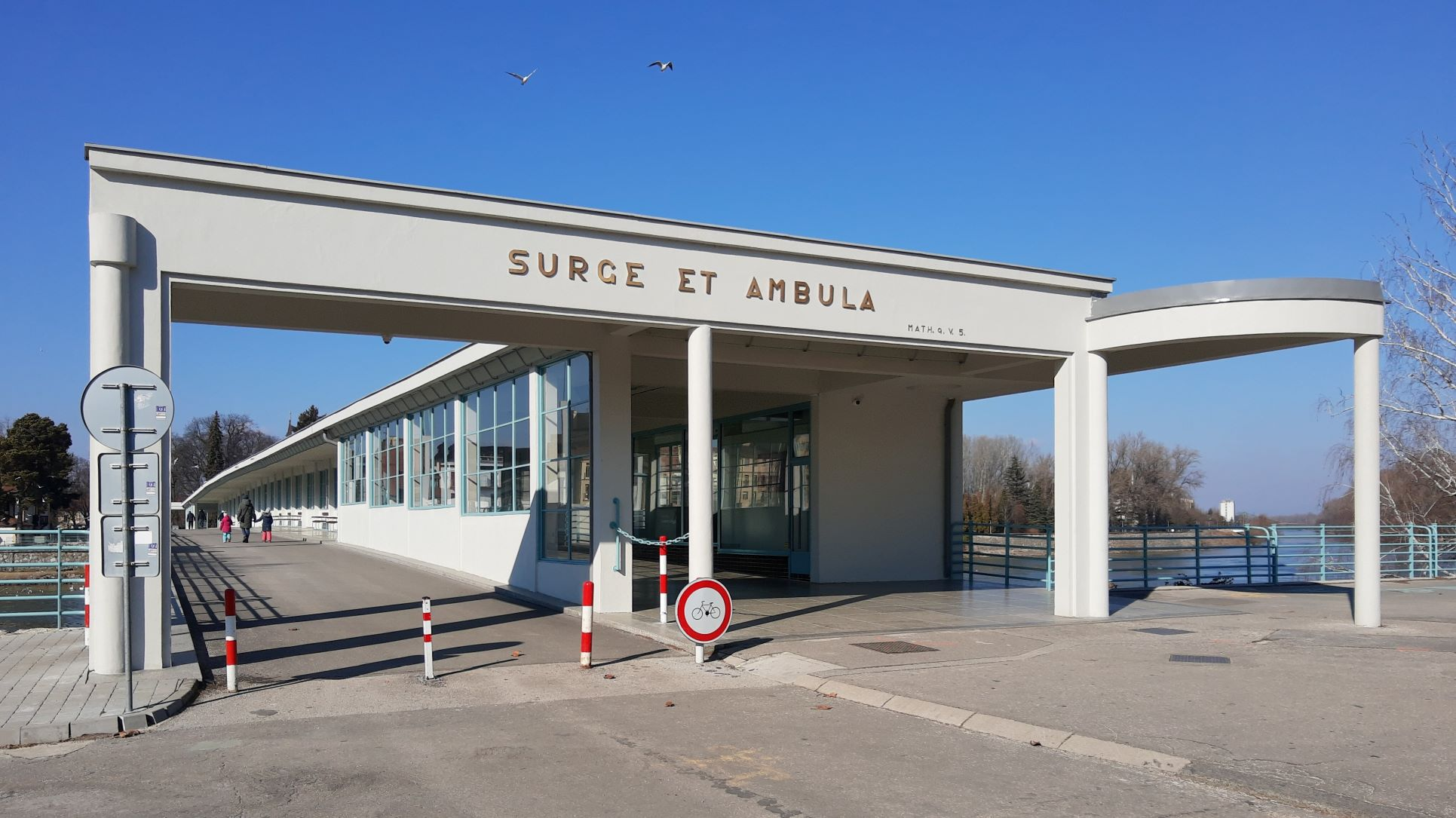
Entrance from the eastern side with writing "SURGE ET AMBULA"
