= Péter Galambos =

Hungarian rower

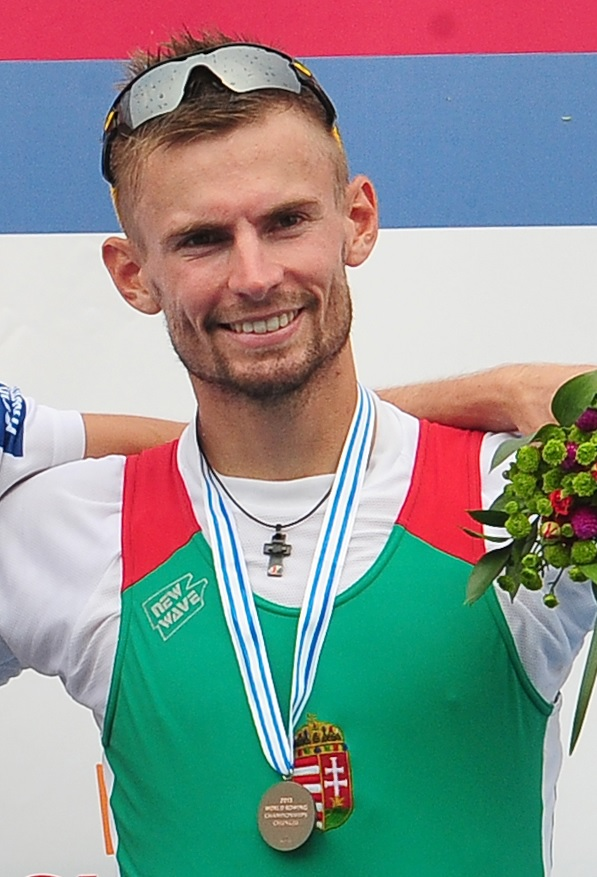

Personal information
- Nationality: Hungarian
- Born: 9 September 1986 (age 39) Vác, Hungary
- Height: 1.80 m (5 ft 11 in)
- Weight: 72 kg (159 lb)

Sport
- Country: Hungary
- Sport: Rowing
- Event: Lightweight single sculls
Medal record
Men's rowing
Representing Hungary
World Championships
Silver medal – second place	2012 Plovdiv	Lwt single sculls
Silver medal – second place	2016 Rotterdam	Lwt single sculls
Silver medal – second place	2019 Ottensheim	Lwt single sculls
Bronze medal – third place	2010 Karapiro	Lwt single sculls
Bronze medal – third place	2013 Chungju	Lwt single sculls
European Championships
Gold medal – first place	2019 Lucerne	Lwt single sculls
Silver medal – second place	2017 Račice	Lwt single sculls

Péter Galambos (born 9 September 1986) is a Hungarian rower. He won the silver medal in the lightweight single sculls at the 2012 World Rowing Championships. Galambos studies economics and management at Óbuda University in Budapest.
