= Piešťany =

Town in Slovakia

- Town
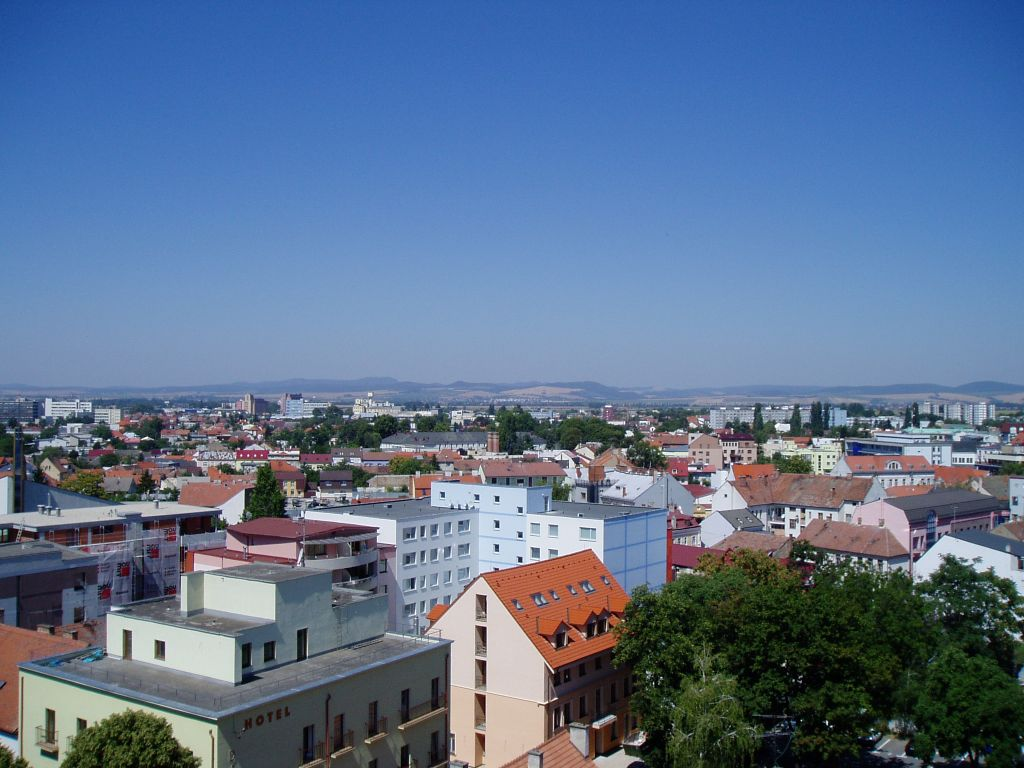
- Aerial view of Piešťany

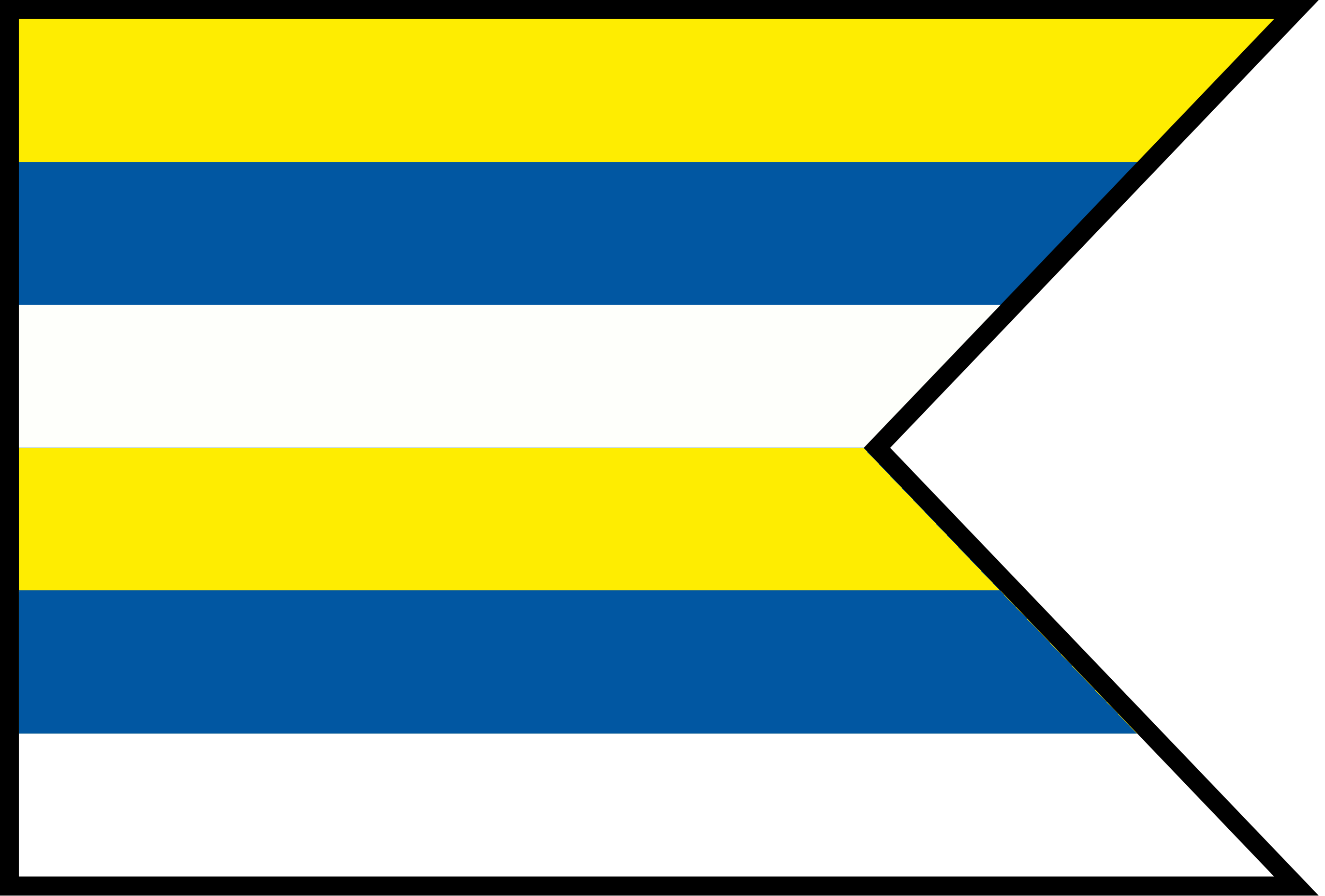
- Flag Coat of arms

- Location of Piešťany in the Trnava Region Location of Piešťany in Slovakia
- Coordinates: 48.58°N 17.83°E
- Country: Slovakia
- Region: Trnava Region
- District: Piešťany District
- First mentioned: 1113

Government
  - Mayor: Peter Jančovič

Area
  - Total: 44.20 km^{2} (17.07 sq mi)
- Elevation: 160 m (520 ft)

Population (2025)
  - Total: 26,086
- Time zone: UTC+1 (CET)
  - Summer (DST): UTC+2 (CEST)
- Postal code: 921 01
- Area code: +421 33
- Vehicle registration plate (until 2022): PN
- Website: www.piestany.sk

Piešťany (Slovak pronunciation: [ˈpɪeʃcani]; German: Pistyan, Hungarian: Pöstyén, Polish: Pieszczany [pjɛˈʂtʂanɨ], Czech: Píšťany [ˈpiːʃcanɪ]) is a town in Slovakia. It is located in the western part of the country within the Trnava Region and is the seat of its own district. It is the biggest and best-known spa town in Slovakia, and has around 28,000 inhabitants.

== Etymology ==
The name Piešťany comes from Slovak Piesok (sand), referring to local sandbanks. The etymology is straightforward – Piešťanci – people who live on the sandy site and Piešťany – their settlement.

== History ==
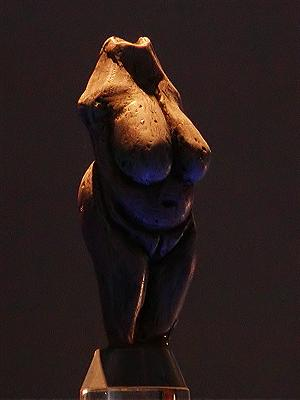
Venus of Moravany nad Váhom

The first human settlement in the area dates from the prehistoric times, about 80,000 years ago. People were attracted to the site by the abundance of game in the vicinity of the thermal springs that did not freeze in winter.

A small female statue representing female fertility called Venus of Moravany was found in the nearby village Moravany nad Váhom. It is made of mammoth ivory and is dated to 22,800 BC. It currently resides in the Bratislava Castle museum. In another nearby village, Krakovany-Stráže, a treasure consisting of luxury items made of glass, bronze, silver, and gold was discovered in three graves from 200 to 300 AD. The surroundings of Piešťany also include the Great Moravian castle of Ducové.

Piešťany was first mentioned in written records in 1113 (as "Pescan"). At that time, it consisted of several smaller settlements. The medicinal springs were already popular in the Middle Ages. They were visited by the Hungarian king Matthias Corvinus. The first book mentioning the Piešťany springs was De admirandis Hungariae aquis hypomnemation (About the Miraculous Waters of the Hungarian Monarchy) by Georgius Wernher, published in 1549 in Basel. In the 16th century, the Piešťany spa was also mentioned by two prominent physicians, Johann Crato de Crafheim (who served several Holy Roman Emperors) and Andrea Baccius Elpidianus (a personal surgeon of the Pope). The first monograph (Schediasma de Thermis Postheinsibus by Ján Justus Torkoš was published in 1745. But in the 16th and 17th centuries, Piešťany also suffered from Turkish raids and anti-Habsburg uprisings.

Throughout the centuries, Piešťany was owned by several noble families; the last of them, the Erdődys, owned the area from 1720 to 1848, and the spa until 1940. The Erdődy family built the first spa buildings in 1778. They were damaged by a destructive flood in 1813. In 1820, the spa buildings were expanded and remodeled in neo-classical style and named Napoleon Spa. The Erdődy family also established the Spa Park in this period. In the years 1889 to 1940, the Winter family rented the spa from the Erdődys and brought it to international fame. Ľudovít Winter improved spa treatment as well as accommodation and entertainment for visitors. They built several spa buildings and hotels.

The spa attracted many aristocratic visitors, including Ludwig van Beethoven. In 1917, three monarchs (Wilhelm II of Germany, Karl I of Austria-Hungary, and Ferdinand I of Bulgaria) orchestrated their war strategy during the negotiations in the Thermia Palace hotel.

In 1945, Piešťany received the official status of a town. In 1959, the Sĺňava water reservoir was built south of the town. In the late 1960s and 1970s, more spa buildings were built. In 1973, the village of Banka, located on the left bank of the Váh river, was amalgamated with Piešťany, but it regained independence after a referendum in 1995. In 1996, the town became the seat of a district.

The 1938 World Fencing Championships were held in Piešťany.

On January 4, 1987, at the final match in the World Junior Championships of ice hockey between Canada and the Soviet Union, there was a bench-clearing brawl, now known as the Punch-up in Piešťany. Both teams were disqualified from the competition as a result.

On July 5, 2001, three members of the Real Irish Republican Army were arrested in Piešťany. They were lured into a trap by agents of the British Security Service MI5 who were posing as arms dealers from Iraq.

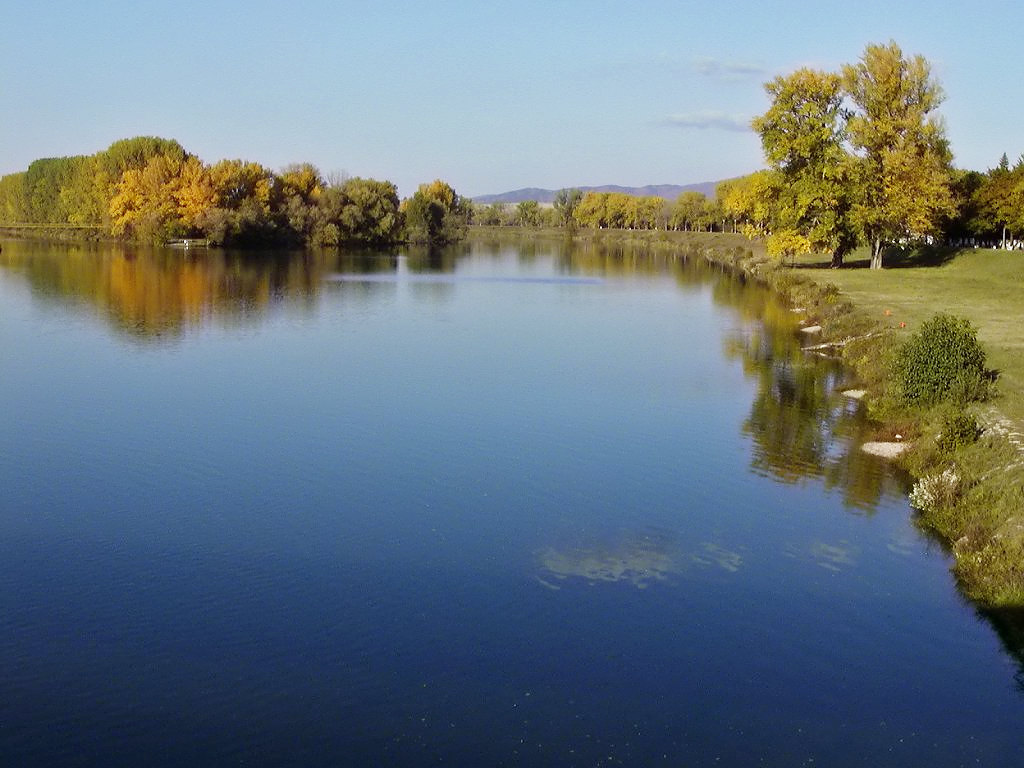
The Váh river in Piešťany

== Geography ==
Piešťany is situated in the western part of Slovakia, in the valley of the Váh river. The municipality lies at an altitude of 160 metres (520 ft) and covers an area of 44.20 km^{2} (17.07 sq mi) (2025). The Považský Inovec mountains form the eastern boundary of this part of the Váh valley. The highest hill of these mountains, Inovec 1,042 m (3,418.64 ft), is about 25 km (16 mi) north of the town. The hills immediately east of the town (10 km (6 mi) away) reach a height of about 700 m (2,296.59 ft). On the western side, the valley boundary is formed by the Little Carpathians, which are somewhat lower and further away from the town. The valley is open to the south, and thus has a warm and sunny temperate climate.

Most of the town is located on the right bank of the river. South of the town is the Sĺňava water reservoir created by a dam on the Váh river. The artificial canal Biskupický canal and the main river branch join in the town. Another short branch of the river (Obtokové rameno) creates the Spa Island.

The hills of Považský Inovec are mostly covered with deciduous forests. These consist of oak and hornbeam in the lower elevations, and beech in the higher elevations. The Váh valley is used for agriculture. The main products are cereals, sugar beet, animal feed, and pork.

Piešťany is located 75 kilometres (47 miles) north-east of Bratislava, the capital of Slovakia, and 30 km (19 mi) north-east of the local regional seat Trnava. Upstream from Piešťany on the Váh river are the towns Nové Mesto nad Váhom (19 km (12 mi) north of Piešťany) and Trenčín (40 km (25 mi) north-east); 17 km (11 mi) downstream is Hlohovec.

Piešťany is located on the route of the D1 motorway from Bratislava to Žilina with connections to Vienna and Brno. The main railway route from Bratislava to Žilina and Košice also goes through the town. The town has an airport, mostly used for international charter flights for spa clients (10,000 passengers in 2007). The municipality operates a local public transport system with 11 bus routes (as of 2008).

== Climate ==
Climate data for Piešťany (1991−2020)
Month	Jan	Feb	Mar	Apr	May	Jun	Jul	Aug	Sep	Oct	Nov	Dec	Year
Record high °C (°F)	16.4 (61.5)	18.9 (66.0)	21.1 (70.0)	30.2 (86.4)	32.4 (90.3)	36.0 (96.8)	38.2 (100.8)	38.4 (101.1)	33.8 (92.8)	28.0 (82.4)	21.4 (70.5)	15.4 (59.7)	38.4 (101.1)
Mean daily maximum °C (°F)	2.5 (36.5)	5.3 (41.5)	10.6 (51.1)	17.1 (62.8)	21.5 (70.7)	25.2 (77.4)	27.4 (81.3)	27.2 (81.0)	21.3 (70.3)	15.4 (59.7)	9.0 (48.2)	3.3 (37.9)	15.5 (59.9)
Daily mean °C (°F)	−0.8 (30.6)	1.0 (33.8)	5.1 (41.2)	10.8 (51.4)	15.4 (59.7)	19.1 (66.4)	20.8 (69.4)	20.4 (68.7)	15.3 (59.5)	10.2 (50.4)	5.5 (41.9)	0.5 (32.9)	10.3 (50.5)
Mean daily minimum °C (°F)	−4.1 (24.6)	−3.2 (26.2)	0.2 (32.4)	4.4 (39.9)	9.1 (48.4)	12.7 (54.9)	13.9 (57.0)	14.4 (57.9)	10.3 (50.5)	5.7 (42.3)	2.1 (35.8)	−2.5 (27.5)	5.2 (41.4)
Record low °C (°F)	−20.7 (−5.3)	−18.5 (−1.3)	−16.2 (2.8)	−8.3 (17.1)	−2.2 (28.0)	2.3 (36.1)	4.8 (40.6)	4.4 (39.9)	0.3 (32.5)	−7.6 (18.3)	−13.3 (8.1)	−22.7 (−8.9)	−22.7 (−8.9)
Average precipitation mm (inches)	31.6 (1.24)	29.8 (1.17)	32.6 (1.28)	37.6 (1.48)	58.4 (2.30)	70.7 (2.78)	70.2 (2.76)	58.1 (2.29)	59.6 (2.35)	48.3 (1.90)	41.0 (1.61)	38.3 (1.51)	576.1 (22.68)
Average precipitation days (≥ 1.0 mm)	7.2	6.2	6.2	6.1	8.9	8.0	7.9	7.1	7.0	7.7	7.0	7.5	86.9
Average snowy days	9.3	7.7	4.2	1.0	0.0	0.0	0.0	0.0	0.0	0.2	3.5	7.5	33.4
Average relative humidity (%)	83.3	78.0	71.0	64.7	66.7	67.8	66.1	67.8	73.6	78.9	82.2	84.8	73.7
Mean monthly sunshine hours	60.4	90.0	142.2	205.4	246.8	258.5	273.0	260.5	180.9	125.5	62.0	49.0	1,954.2
Source: NOAA

== Main sights ==
Because of frequent floods in the past, most buildings are dated to the 19th and 20th centuries. The most notable exception is the ruins of a medieval monastery from the 13th century. The Napoleon Spa is a complex of Neoclassicist spa buildings built between 1822 and 1862. The town's Catholic church dates from the same era. The Kolonádový most bridge, constructed by Emil Belluš in 1930–33, is a preeminent functionalist construction with many precious art objects. The local airport is home to the Military History Museum Piešťany.

=== Spa ===
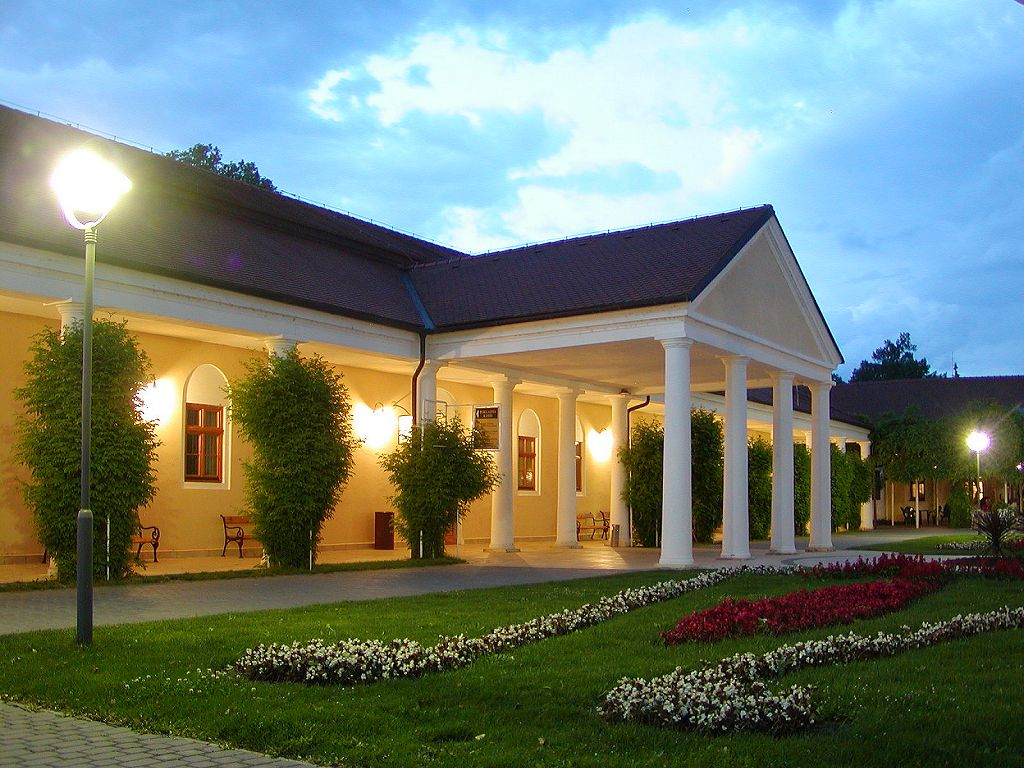
The Napoleonic Spa

The Piešťany spa has a capacity of 2,000 beds (as of 2005) and treats over 40,000 patients a year. More than 60% of the clients are foreigners (mostly from Germany, the Czech Republic, Israel, Austria, and Arab Countries). The spa specializes in the treatment of chronic rheumatic and arthritic diseases and post-accident lesions of joints and bones.

The spa is located on the Spa Island between two branches of the Váh river, at the site of several hot springs with temperatures of 67–69 °C (153–156 °F). The water originates in a tectonic break at 2,000 metres (6,600 feet) depth. The sulfate–carbonate water from the springs is used in pools and tubs. Sulfurous mud extracted from the bed of a side channel of the river is also used for treatment in the form of thermal mud pools with a temperature 39 °C (102 °F) and for partial and full body packs. Spring water and mud therapy are complemented by electrotherapy, exercise, massage, medication, and diet.

The spa is operated by the company Slovenské liečebné kúpele. The company was purchased in 2002 by Danubius Hotels Group. A small share is owned by the town. Danubius Hotels Group also owns hotels in Hungary, Mariánské Lázně spa in Czech Republic and Sovata spa in Romania.

== Population ==
Historical population
Year	Pop.	±%
1970	23,385	—
1980	28,511	+21.9%
1991	31,452	+10.3%
2001	30,606	−2.7%
2011	28,268	−7.6%
2021	27,681	−2.1%
Source: Censuses

Population statistic (10 years)
Year	1995	2005	2015	2025
Count	31,089	29,855	27,855	26,086
Difference		−3.96%	−6.69%	−6.35%

Population statistic
Year	2024	2025
Count	26,379	26,086
Difference		−1.11%

It has a population of 26,086 people (31 December 2025).

=== Ethnicity ===
Census 2021 (1+ %)
Ethnicity	Number	Fraction
Slovak	25,059	90.52%
Not found out	2047	7.39%
Czech	450	1.62%
Total	27,681	

In year 2021 was 27,681 people by ethnicity 25,059 as Slovak, 2047 as Not found out, 450 as Czech, 180 as Other, 108 as Hungarian, 97 as Russian, 55 as Ukrainian, 47 as Romani, 47 as German, 44 as Vietnamese, 31 as Rusyn, 27 as Serbian, 24 as Moravian, 22 as Italian, 21 as Croatian, 21 as English, 18 as Austrian, 17 as Polish, 15 as French, 13 as Jewish, 10 as Romanian, 7 as Bulgarian, 7 as Albanian, 6 as Chinese, 6 as Canadian, 5 as Turkish, 3 as Silesian, 3 as Korean, 1 as Irish and 1 as Greek.

Note on population: The difference values of population numbers in the table "Population statistic" and in the sections "Ethnicity" & "Religion" is caused by the use of various statistical methods.

=== Religion ===
Census 2021 (1+ %)
Religion	Number	Fraction
Roman Catholic Church	14,570	52.64%
None	8390	30.31%
Not found out	2548	9.2%
Evangelical Church	1174	4.24%
Total	27,681	

In year 2021 was 27,681 people by religion 14,570 from Roman Catholic Church, 8390 from None, 2548 from Not found out, 1174 from Evangelical Church, 164 from Jehovah's Witnesses, 139 from Greek Catholic Church, 124 from Ad hoc movements, 103 from Other, 86 from Eastern Orthodox Church, 79 from Buddhism, 64 from Christian Congregations in Slovakia, 48 from Islam, 40 from Calvinist Church, 35 from Other and not ascertained christian church, 25 from Paganism and natural spirituality, 23 from Apostolic Church, 20 from Jewish community, 14 from United Methodist Church, 10 from Czechoslovak Hussite Church, 8 from Hinduism, 6 from Seventh-day Adventist Church, 5 from Old Catholic Church, 3 from Church of the Brethren, 1 from New Apostolic Church, 1 from Baptists Church and 1 from Bahá'i Community.

== Economy ==
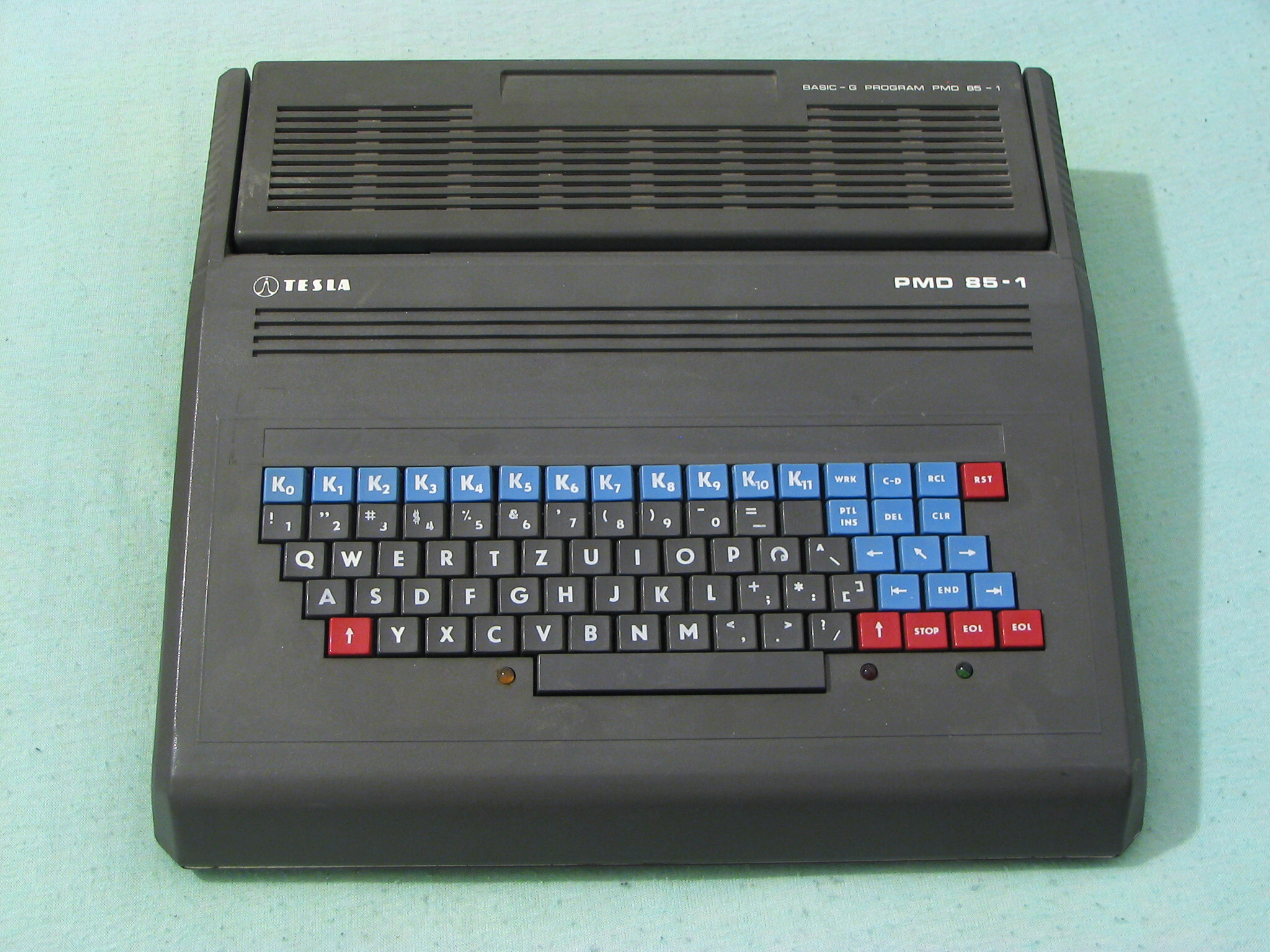
The 8-bit PMD 85 personal computer produced in 1985–1990 by the Czechoslovak Tesla company in Piešťany

One of the important employers in the city during the communist era was the Czechoslovak electronics maker Tesla Piešťany. It closed down in 1991, and in 1998 its factories were acquired by ON Semiconductor, a former subsidiary of Motorola, keeping a small customer support centre in the town. Delipro, s.r.o., a manufacturer of quartz crystals founded in 1993, is another company building on the legacy of electronics manufacturing in the region.

Other important employers in the town include the Slovak headquarters of the financial services company Home Credit Slovakia. Technický skúšobný ústav Piešťany is an independent certification, testing, and inspection body for conformity assessment of machinery and construction products, and consumer goods. Historically, Technický skúšobný ústav Piešťany is one of the oldest and the largest testing bodies in the Slovak Republic within testing activity.

== Culture ==
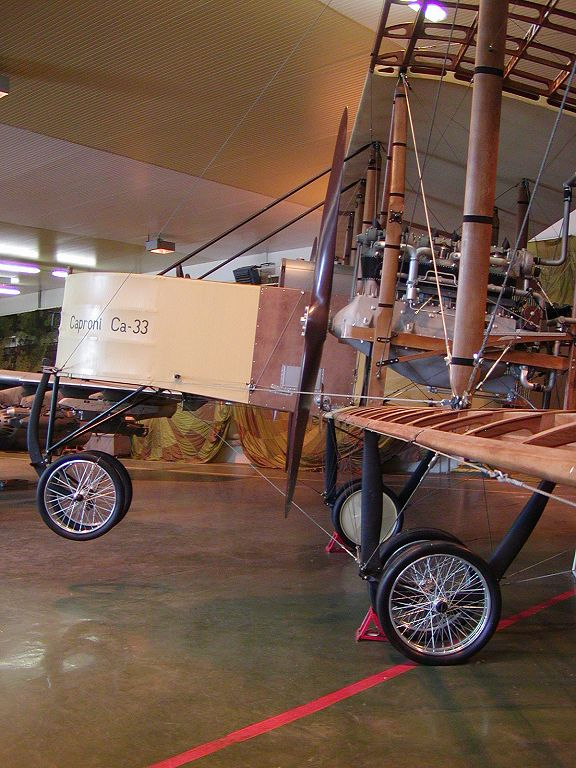
A World War I biplane of Milan Rastislav Štefánik in the military museum

The town is known in Slovakia for its rich cultural programme throughout the year. In the summer tourist season, the town hosts several cultural events. Both the opening (in June) and the closing (in September) of the summer spa season are connected with big street festivals. An annual summer classical music festival, Piešťany Music Festival, established in 1955, takes place in the House of Arts of Piešťany. This venue, with a seating capacity of 622, is currently the largest cinema hall in Slovakia and also offers other concerts and theatre shows. Country Lodenica is a festival of folk and country music established in 1999. It takes place south of the town, on the shores of the Sĺňava water reservoir. Since the 2000s, various festivals have been held at Piešťany Airport, among others, second second-largest music festival in Slovakia - GrapeFestival, rock-centered Topfest, and electronic music-focused BeeFree or Hodokvas. Furthermore, from 2006 to 2009 and since 2019, there have been air shows. There were also regular car-, motorcycle- and truck-races.

Between 1967 and 1993, the city was the site of an annual sculpture exhibition in the Spa Park. This tradition was renewed in 2005 and 2008.

Piešťany also has several museums. The Balneological Museum of Imrich Winter, the only one of its type in the region, focuses on archaeology, history, and ethnography of the region, as well as the history of Slovakia's spas in general. It was established in 1933 by the Winter family. Another small museum belonging to the Balneological Museum commemorates the life of the Slovak poet Ivan Krasko, who lived in Piešťany from 1945 to 1958. Finally, a new museum at the airport (active since 2004) exhibits a collection related to the Slovak military history from 1945 to 1992.

The House of Arts is the first postwar Slovak theatre building outside Bratislava, being a project of architect Ferdinand Milučký. In the first half of September, the annual International Film Festival Cinematik is held in various areas of Piešťany. It is currently the second-largest film festival in Slovakia.

== Notable people ==
- An art colony established by several Slovak artists, including Janko Alexy, Martin Benka, Miloš Alexander Bazovský, and Zoltán Palugyay, existed in Piešťany in 1932–1937
- Lukáš Babač, professional rower, participant at the 2004 Summer Olympics
- Irena Belohorská, politician, former member of the European Parliament, born in Piešťany in 1948
- Ľudmila Cervanová, professional tennis player, was born in Piešťany in 1979
- Dominika Cibulková, professional tennis player, born in 1989, grew up in Piešťany
- Róbert Erban, world champion in the kayak K4 was born in Piešťany in 1972
- Emire Khidayer, diplomat, entrepreneur, and writer, was born in Piešťany in 1971
- Filip Hološko, professional footballer
- Filip Horanský, tennis player, born in Piešťany in 1993
- Slavomír Kňazovický, a flatwater canoeist, was born in Piešťany in 1969
- Ivan Krasko, a Slovak poet, lived in Piešťany from 1945 to 1958 (his former apartment houses a small museum)
- Charles Korvin, Hungarian-American actor and photographer, born Géza Kárpáthy in Piešťany in 1907
- Lukáš Lacko, tennis player
- Michel Miklík, ice hockey player, was born in Piešťany in 1982
- Martina Moravcová, a swimmer with 2 silver Olympic medals, was born in Piešťany in 1976 and grew up in the town
- Ladislav Mucina (born 1956), vegetation scientist
- Branko Radivojevič, ice hockey player, was born in Piešťany in 1980
- Ernő Rubik, Hungarian aircraft designer
- Magdaléna Rybáriková, tennis player, born in Piešťany in 1988
- Patrik Vrbovský, also known as Rytmus, born in 1977, rapper, grew up in Pieštany
- Ján Šlahor, professional footballer, born in Piešťany in 1977
- Frederick Stafford, European film actor of Slovak German origin, born Friedrich Strobel von Stein in Piešťany in 1928
- Ivan Stodola, writer, playwright, and physician, lived in Piešťany from 1953 to 1977
- Yissachar Shlomo Teichtal, the Chief Rabbi of Slovakia, worked in Piešťany from 1920 to 1942
- Shmuel Dovid Ungar, Rabbi, Rosh yeshiva of the Nitra Yeshiva, born in Piešťany in 1886
- Victor Vasarely, Hungarian artist, father of op-art, grew up in Piešťany

== Twin towns – sister cities ==
Piešťany is twinned with:

- Újbuda (Budapest), Hungary
- Eilat, Israel
- Hajdúnánás, Hungary
- Heinola, Finland
- Luhačovice, Czech Republic
- Poděbrady, Czech Republic
- Ustroń, Poland
- Varaždinske Toplice, Croatia
