= Sean Murphy (rower) =

Australian rower (born 1996)

Personal information
- Nationality: Australian
- Born: 28 April 1996 (age 30)
- Home town: Sydney, New South Wales, Australia
- Years active: 2013–
- Height: 175 cm (5 ft 9 in)
- Weight: 65 kg (143 lb)

Sport
- Country: Australia
- Sport: Rowing
- Event: Lightweight single sculls
- Club: Mosman Rowing Club
- Coached by: Don McLachlan
Medal record
Men's rowing
Representing Australia
World Championships
Bronze medal – third place	2019 Ottensheim	Lwt single sculls
U23 World Championships
Bronze medal – third place	2018 Poznan	Lwt single sculls

Sean Murphy (born 28 April 1996) is an Australian representative lightweight rower. He is a 2018 Australian national champion; won bronze medals at senior and U/23 World Championships as a lightweight sculler; and in 2019 won two gold medals in lightweight sculling at Rowing World Cups in the international representative season.

== Club and state rowing ==
His Australian senior club rowing has been from the Mosman Rowing Club in Sydney.

In 2017 in Mosman colours, Murphy placed second in both the U23 men's lightweight single sculls title and the U23 men's lightweight double scull at the Australian Rowing Championships. In 2018 he finished third in the final for the U23 men's lightweight single scull national title.

Murphy first made state selection for New South Wales in the 2017 lightweight men's four to contest the Penrith Cup at the Interstate Regatta. He was again selected in New South Wales Penrith Cup fours in 2018 and 2019. Those crews placed third in 2017, won the Australian title in 2018 and placed second in 2019.

== International representative rowing ==
Murphy made his Australian representative debut in a coxless four at the World Junior Rowing Championships in Hamburg in 2014. That crew finished in overall thirteenth place. In 2017 he moved into the Australian senior squad. He rowed in the quad scull at the Rowing World Cup II in Poznan to a tenth placing and then at the 2017 Rowing World Cup III in Poznan he stroked the Australian men's lightweight quad scull to fifth place.

In 2018 Murphy was still eligible for U23 selection. As Australia's lightweight single sculler at the Rowing World Cup II in Lucerne he fought through the repechage to a sixth place final finish and then was picked to contest the World Rowing U23 Championships in Poznan where he took the bronze medal. In 2019 Murphy was selected to row Australia's lightweight single for the 2019 international season. In the finals at the World Rowing Cup II in Poznan and at the WRC III in Rotterdam, Murphy took leads at the 500m mark, was never headed and won two international gold medals. Murphy was then selected to race the Australian lightweight scull at the 2019 World Rowing Championships in Linz, Austria. He placed third in his heat, second in his quarter and semi finals and then placed third in the A-final to claim a World Championship bronze medal.

Before the delayed Tokyo Olympics at the final Olympic qualification regatta in Lucerne, Switzerland in May 2021 and now paired with Hamish Parry, he raced an Australian representative lightweight double, attempting to qualify that boat. They made their final, but missed the Olympic cut-off.

In March 2023 Murphy was again selected as a sculler in the Australian men's lightweight squad for the 2023 international season. At the Rowing World Cup II in Varese, Italy Murphy raced as Australia's MLW2X entrant with Oscar McGuinness. They made the B final and finished in overall seventh place. At 2023's RWC III in Lucerne, Murphy and McGuinness again raced the MLW2X. They were beaten out of 2nd place in the repechage by 9/100th of a second, made the C final which they won for an overall 13th place at the regatta. Murphy and McGuinness were selected to race Australia's double scull at 2023 World Rowing Championships in Belgrade, Serbia. They placed fourth in their heat, progressing to the quarter-finals. They ultimately finished fourth in the C final for an overall 16th place at the regatta.
