= House of Arts Piešťany =

Coordinates: 48°35′32.12″N 17°50′23.52″E

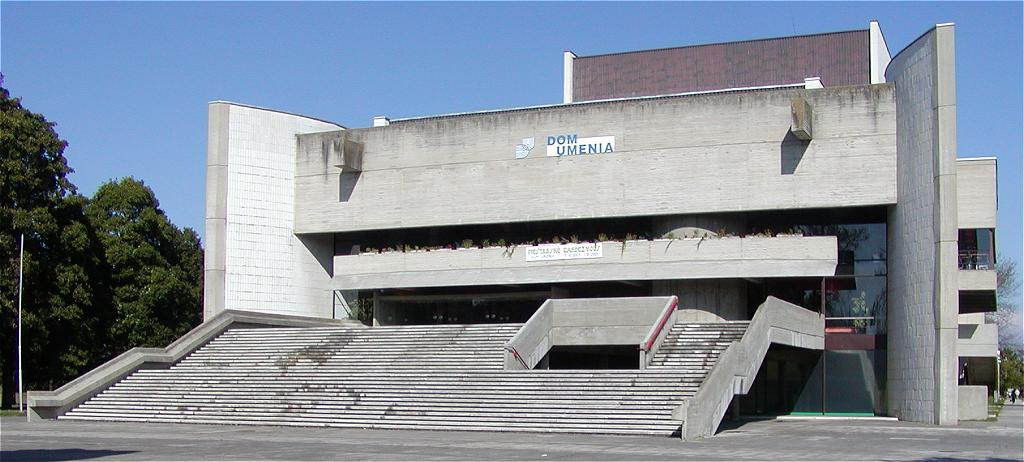

House of Arts (Slovak: Dom Umenia) is cultural and social center situated at Embankment of Ivan Krasko in Piešťany. The House of Arts is a first Slovak theatre building for a special purpose after World War II that was not realized in Bratislava. It was realized in 1974-1979 (in use since 1980) according to project of architect Ferdinand Milučký. As the author said he utilised "inspiring impulses of Slovak historical and folk architecture" and he created work of art that represents unity of exterior and interior.

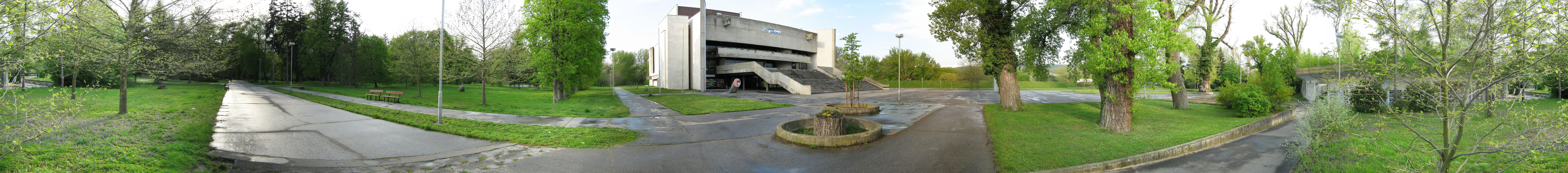
Panorama of exterior near House of Arts.
