= Konstantin Steinhübel =

German rower (born 1990)

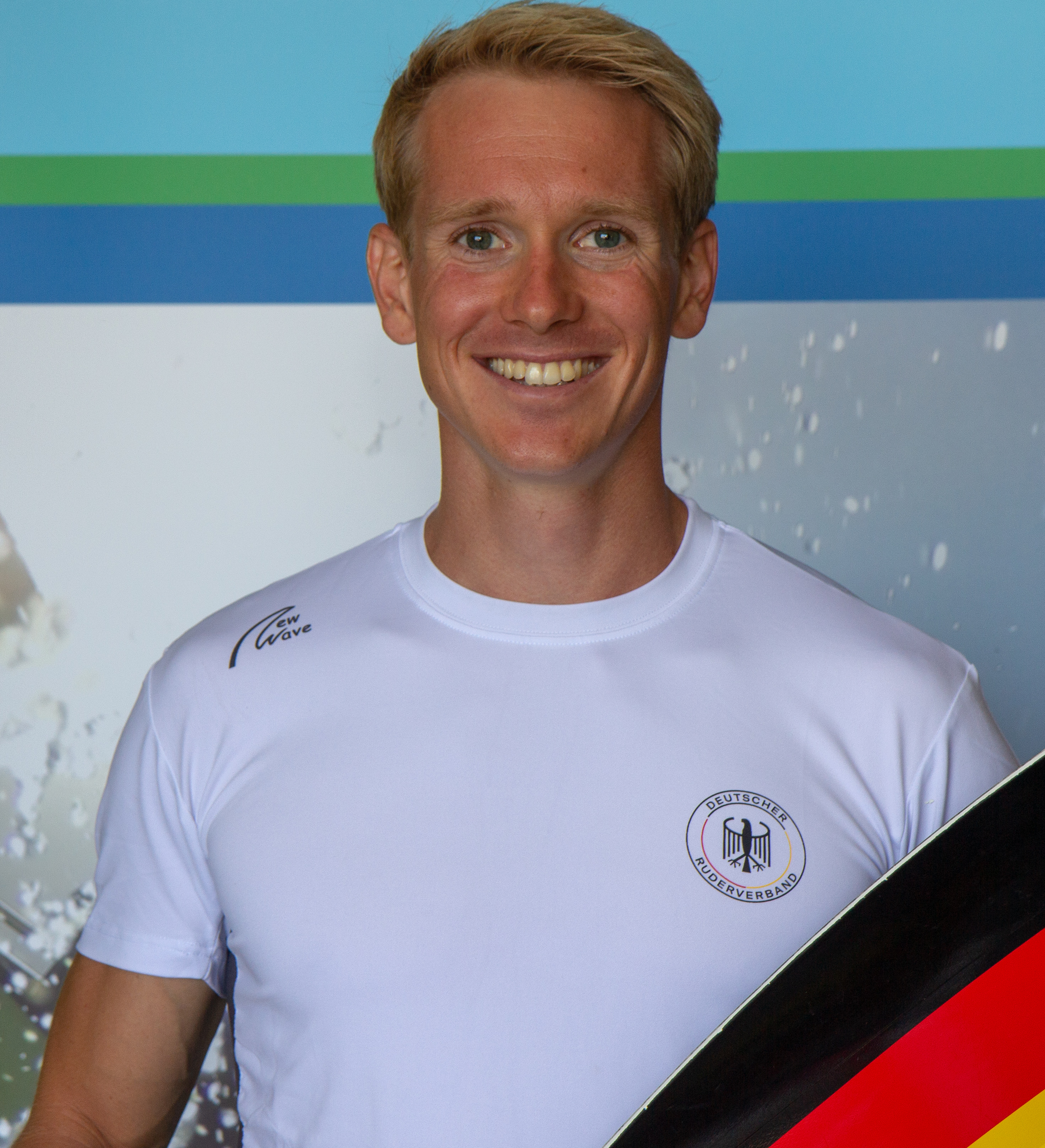

Personal information
- Born: 5 January 1990 (age 36)

Sport
- Sport: Rowing
Medal record
Men's rowing
Representing Germany
World Championships
Silver medal – second place	2014 Amsterdam	LM4x

Konstantin Steinhübel (born 5 January 1990) is a German rower. He won the silver medal in the lightweight quadruple sculls at the 2014 World Rowing Championships.
