= Piešťany Airport =

Piešťany Airport Letisko Piešťany
- IATA: PZY; ICAO: LZPP

Summary
- Airport type: Public
- Operator: Slovak Airports Association
- Serves: Piešťany, Slovakia
- Elevation AMSL: 545 ft (166 m)
- Coordinates: 48°37′30″N 17°49′43″E
- Website: airport-piestany.sk
- Interactive map of Piešťany Airport

Runways
Direction	Length		Surface
Direction	m	ft	Surface
01/19	2,000	6,562	Asphalt

Piešťany Airport (IATA: PZY, ICAO: LZPP) is a minor international airport serving the spa town of Piešťany, Slovakia.

== Operations ==
The Grand Tour special, "Eurocrash", released on 16 June 2023, featured a drag race on the runway.

== Airlines and destinations ==
The following airlines operate charter flights at Piešťany Airport:

Airlines	Destinations
Corendon Airlines	Seasonal charter: Antalya
Cyprus Airways	Seasonal charter: Larnaca
