= Matteo Mulas =

Italian male rower

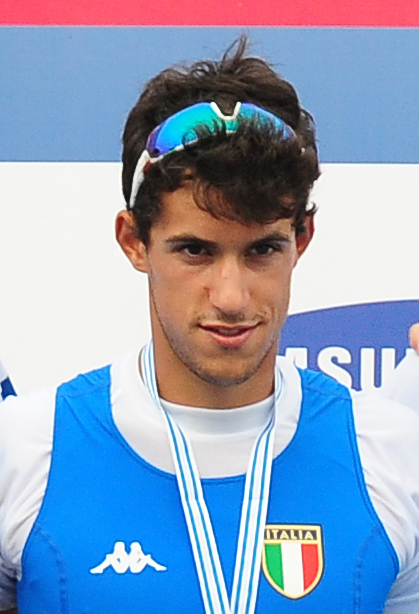
- Mulas in 2013

Personal information
- National team: Italy
- Born: 16 March 1992 (age 34) Terni, Italy

Sport
- Sport: Rowing
Medal record
Event	1st	2nd	3rd
World Championships	0	1	1
European Championships	1	0	0
Total	1	1	1

Matteo Mulas (born 16 March 1992) is an Italian rower who won a silver medal at the 2018 World Championships in Plovdiv, Bulgaria.

== Championships ==
- World Rowing Championships

Chungju 2013: bronze medal LM4x.
Plovdiv 2018: silver medal LM4x.

- European Rowing Championships

Glasgow 2018: gold medal
