= Luka Radonić =

Croatian rower

Personal information
- Nationality: Croat
- Born: February 2, 1993 (age 33) Zagreb, Croatia
- Education: Zagreb University

Sport
- Country: Croatia
- Sport: Rowing
- Club: VK Mladost (Zagreb)

Achievements and titles
- World finals: U23 bronze medal (Plovdiv 2015)
Medal record
Men's rowing
Representing Croatia
Mediterranean Games
Gold medal – first place	2018 Tarragona	LM1x
World Rowing U23 Championships
Bronze medal – third place	2015 Plovdiv	LM1x

Luka Radonić (2 February 1993) is a Croatian rower. He won a gold medal at the 2018 Mediterranean Games competing in lightweight single sculls.

He was born in Zagreb in February 1993. He took up rowing at the age of 12, before which he played ice hockey.

Radonić won bronze medal at the U23 World Championships in 2015. He placed 5th in the 2018 European Rowing Championships.
