= Miloš Stanojević (rower) =

Serbian rower

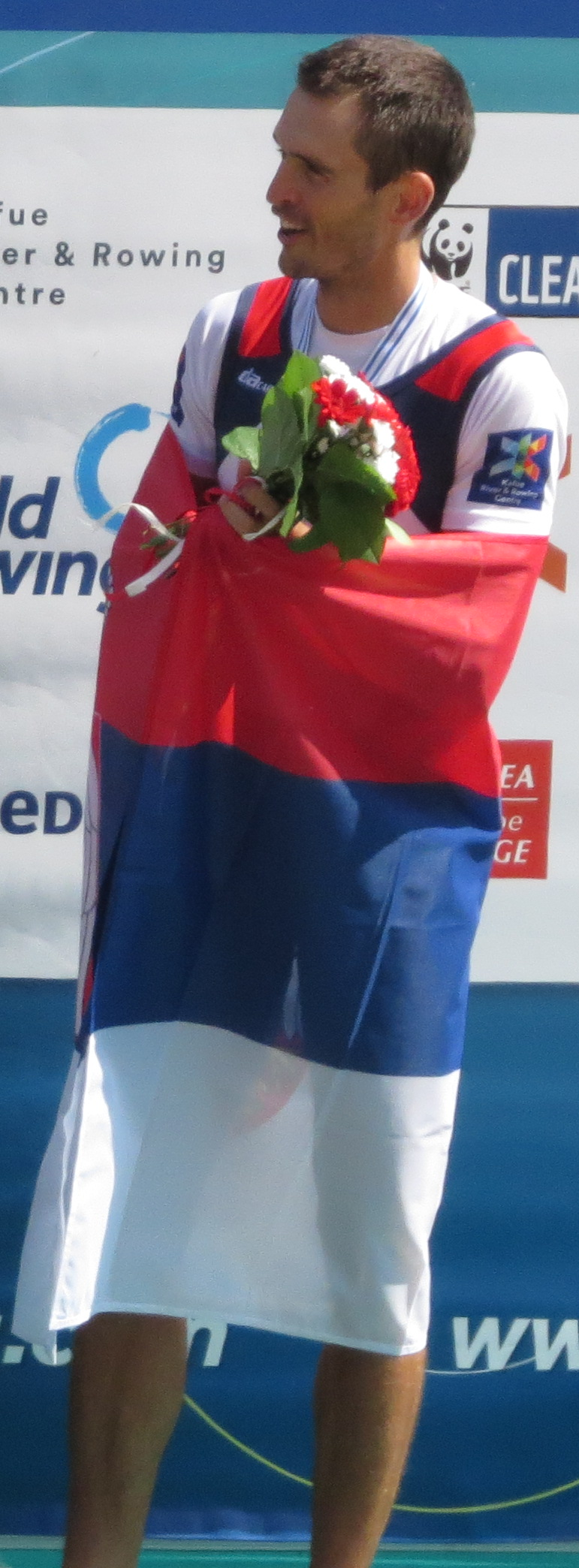

Medal record

Men's rowing

Representing Serbia

World Championships
Bronze medal – third place	2015 Aiguebelette	LM1x

European Championships
Bronze medal – third place	2009 Brest	LM4-
Bronze medal – third place	2011 Plovdiv	LM4−
Bronze medal – third place	2012 Varese	LM4−

Miloš Stanojević (Serbian: Милош Станојевић; born 27 May 1984 in Belgrade, SR Serbia, Yugoslavia) is a Serbian rower.

He won a bronze medal at the 2015 World Rowing Championships and three bronze medals at the European Rowing Championships between 2009 and 2012.
