= List of airports in Slovakia =

This is a list of airports in Slovakia, grouped by type and sorted by location.

== Airports ==
Airport names shown in bold indicate the airport has scheduled service on commercial airlines.

City served	Region	ICAO	IATA	Airport name	Coordinates
**Public airports**					
Bratislava	Bratislava	LZIB	BTS	**M. R. Štefánik Airport** (Bratislava Airport)	48°10′12″N 017°12′45″E
Košice	Košice	LZKZ	KSC	**Košice International Airport** (public / military)	48°39′47″N 021°14′28″E
Jasná	Žilina	LZJS		Aerodrome Jasná	49°02′52″N 019°30′24″E
Lučenec	Banská Bystrica	LZLU	LUE	Bol'kovce Airport	48°20′22″N 019°44′09″E
Martin	Žilina	LZMA		Martin Airport	49°03′55″N 018°57′03″E
Holíč	Trnava	LZHL		Holíč Airport	048°48′27″N 017°08′11″E
Nitra	Nitra	LZNI		Nitra Airport	48°16′46″N 018°07′58″E
Nové Zámky	Nitra	LZNZ		Nové Zámky Airport	47°57′39″N 18°11′10″E
Piešťany	Trnava	LZPP	PZY	**Piešťany Airport**	48°37′30″N 017°49′42″E
Poprad	Prešov	LZTT	TAT	**Poprad-Tatry Airport**	49°04′24″N 020°14′28″E
Prievidza	Trenčín	LZPE		Prievidza Airport	48°45′58″N 018°35′12″E
Senica	Trnava	LZSE		Senica Airport	48°39′28″N 017°19′47″E
Trenčín	Trenčín	LZTN		Trenčín Airport (public / military)	48°51′54″N 017°59′32″E
Žilina	Žilina	LZZI	ILZ	Žilina Airport	49°13′53″N 018°36′48″E
**Military airports**					
Malacky / Kuchyňa	Bratislava	LZMC		Malacky Air Base (Kuchyňa Air Base)	48°24′07″N 017°07′06″E
Prešov	Prešov	LZPW	POV	Prešov Air Base	49°01′47″N 021°18′56″E
Sliač	Banská Bystrica	LZSL	SLD	Sliač Air Base	48°38′16″N 019°08′02″E
**Former airports**					
Vajnory	Bratislava	LZVB		Vajnory Airport (closed Jan. 2007)	

== See also ==
- Transport in Slovakia
- Slovak Air Force
- List of airports by ICAO code: L#LZ – Slovakia
- Wikipedia:WikiProject Aviation/Airline destination lists: Europe#Slovakia
