= Malacky Air Base =

- Letecká základňa Malacky
- Malacky, Slovakia
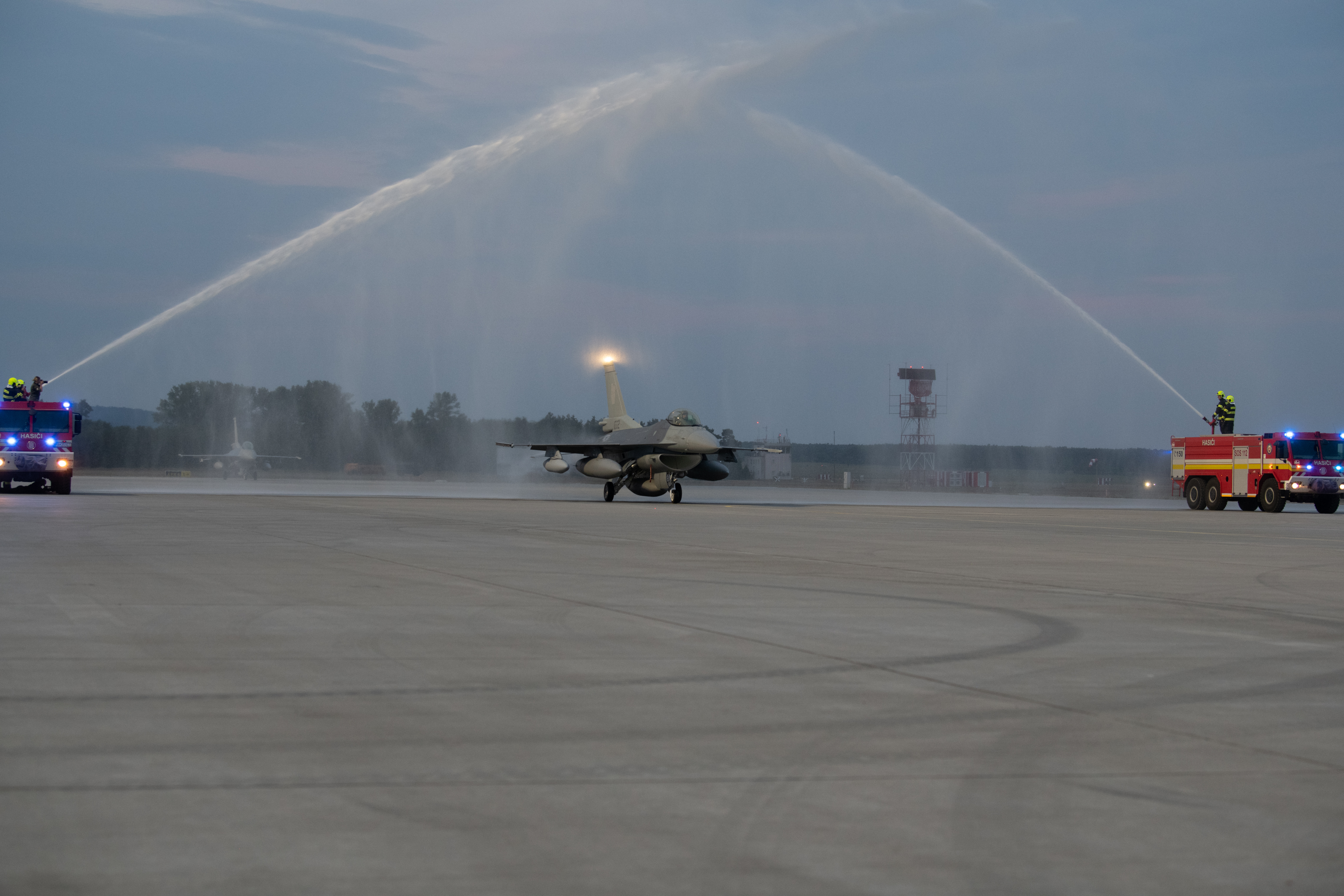

Site information
- Type: Air base

Location
- Location of Malacky Air Base in Slovakia Malacky Air Base (Europe)
- Coordinates: 48°24′07″N 017°07′06″E

Site history
- Built: 1937
- In use: 1937 – present

Garrison information
- Garrison: Slovak Armed Forces

Airfield information
- Identifiers: IATA: LZMC, ICAO: LZMC
- Elevation: 213 m (699 ft) AMSL
Runways
Direction	Length and surface
01/19	2,400 m (7,874 ft) Asphalt

Malacky Air Base (ICAO: LZMC) is a military airport located near Malacky, a town in the Bratislava Region of Slovakia.

footnotes = Source: DAFIF

== History ==
The first evidence of a military presence in the village of Kuchyňa dates back to 1918, with records of an airfield and shooting range appearing in 1922. These reports mention a large military range used for bombing practice and live firing from aircraft. The area, approximately 12 km long and 7 km wide, stretched east of Malacky, north toward Rárboch (Rohožník), and south toward Kuchyňa. Adjacent to the range was an airfield, called Nový Dvor, named after a former estate in the area. The range operated seasonally, hosting all squadrons of the Czechoslovak Air Force once or twice a year, while the Plzeň arms factory used it for weapon and ammunition testing. The airfield and range provided essential training for Czechoslovak Air Force, supported by specialized infrastructure and equipment.

During World War II, the Luftwaffe took over the airfield starting in March 1939, even though an agreement between Slovakia and Germany was retroactively signed on January 21, 1941. In March 1939, German forces seized the facilities, fuel reserves (79,797 liters), and 18 aircraft stationed there, including types such as Š-328, Š-616, Š-16, A-230, and A-330.

On September 20, 1944, the 15th U.S. Air Force carried out an air raid on the airfield, rendering the base inoperable. Of the 46 German aircraft stationed there, 41 were destroyed or damaged. As the Germans had used the base for air raids on rebel-held territory, its neutralization, along with a rebel air raid on the Piešťany airfield, shifted air superiority in fighter operations (though not in bombing) over Slovakia to the rebels.

In 1947, Unit 4562 Kuchyňa was established, retaining this designation until October 31, 1992. The unit's development was unique within the Czechoslovak People's Army Air Force, as no combat units were ever stationed there due to the proximity to the Austrian border. Instead, its operations were tailored for flight training and the use of the nearby shooting range.

== Gallery ==
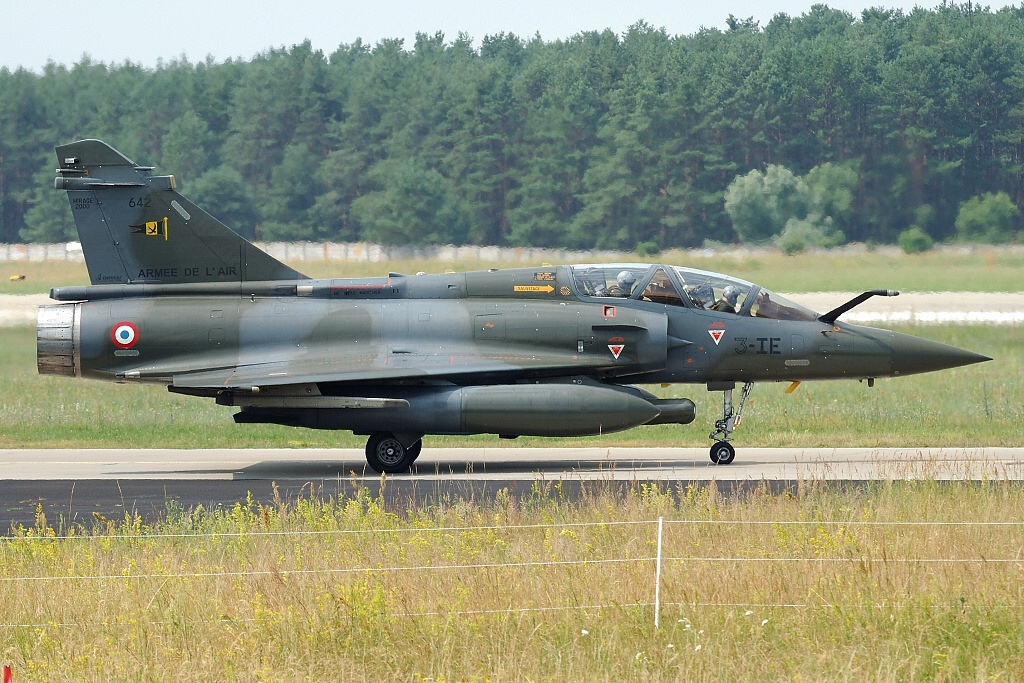
Dassault Mirage 2000D of French Air Force on Malacky Air Base

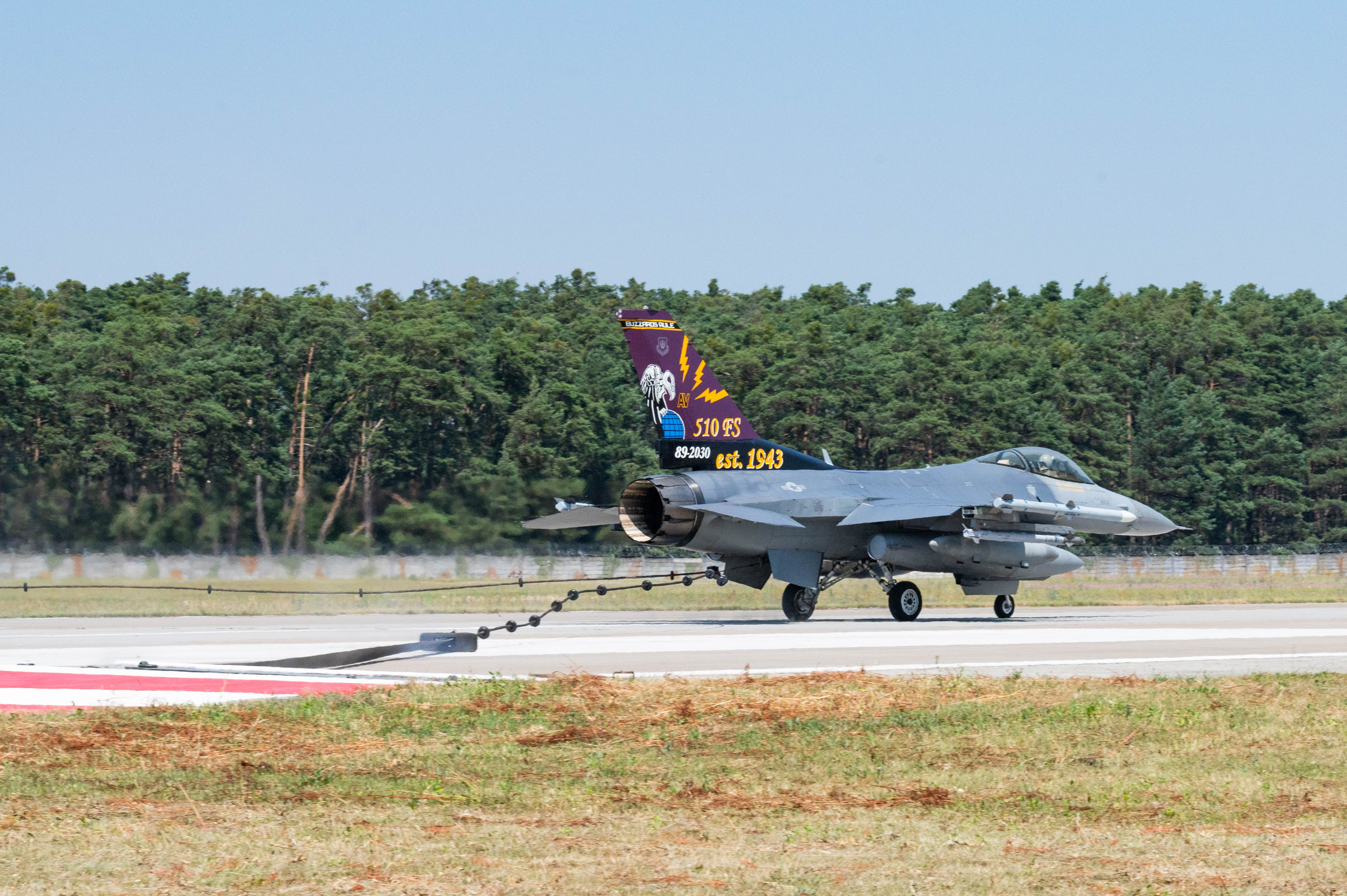
BAK-12 system installed on Malacky Air Base tested by U.S. F-16

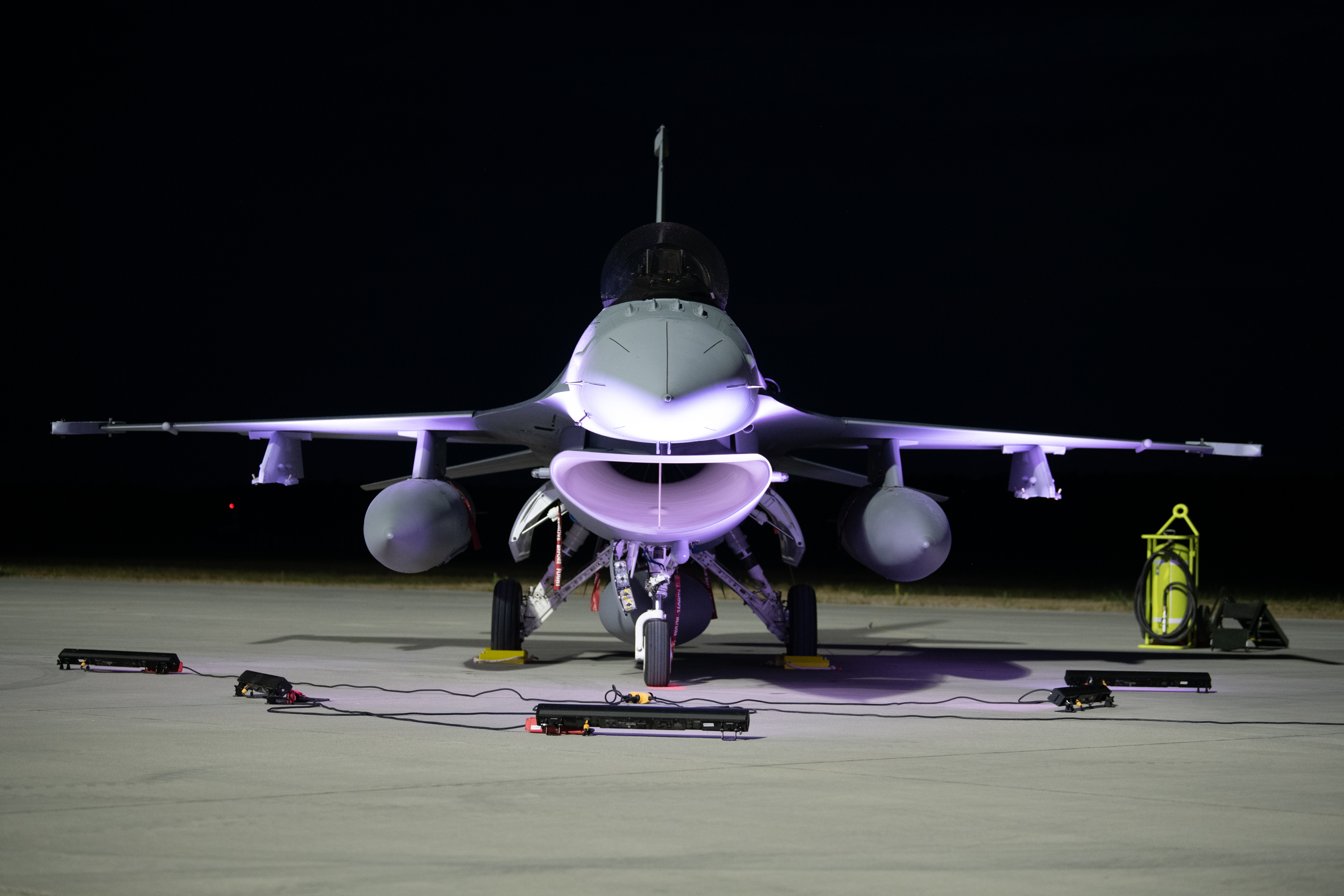
122nd Fighter Wing pilot delivers Slovakia's first F-16s

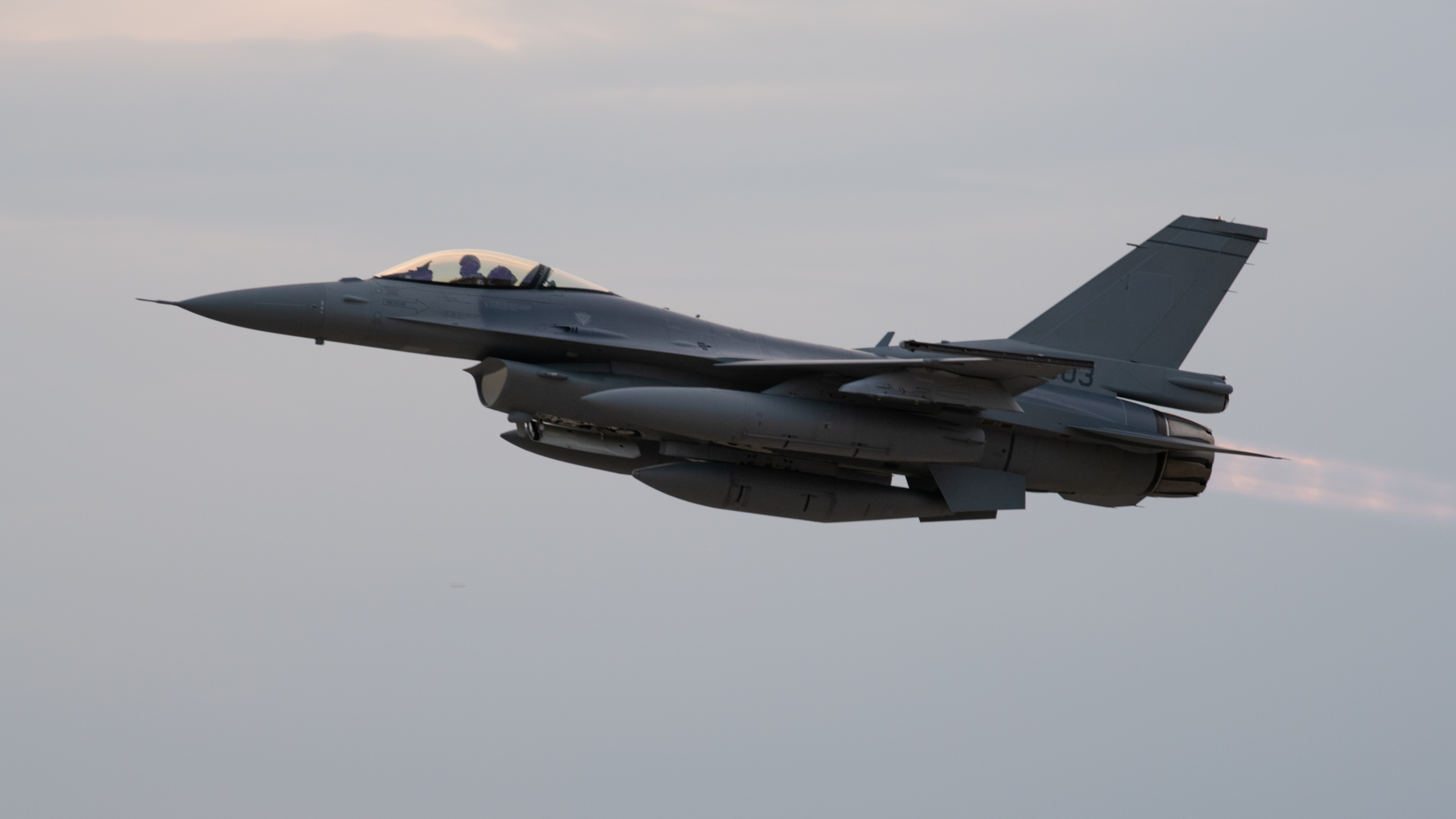
First Slovak F-16 in sky

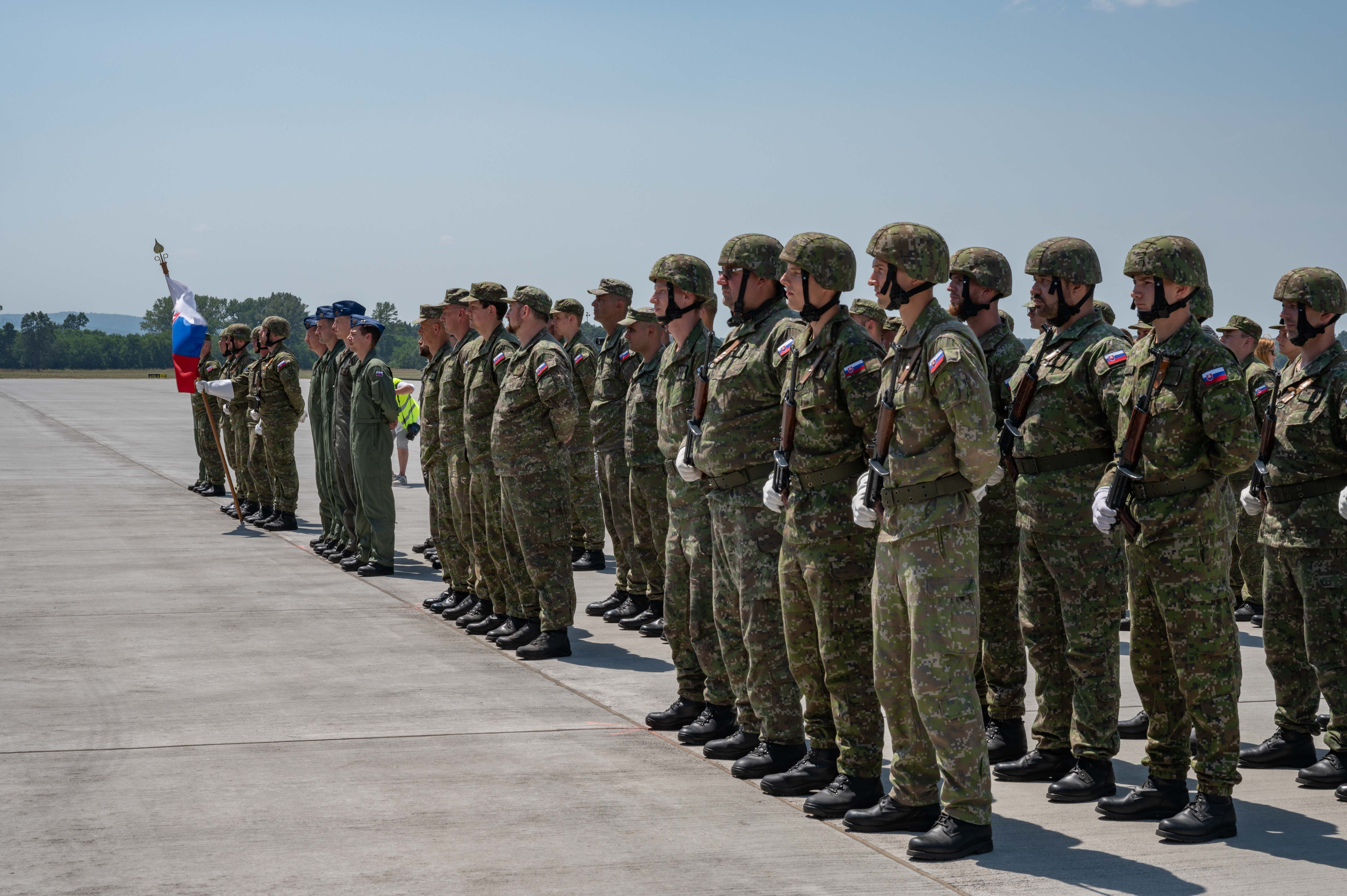
Slovakian soldier in ceremonial line-up

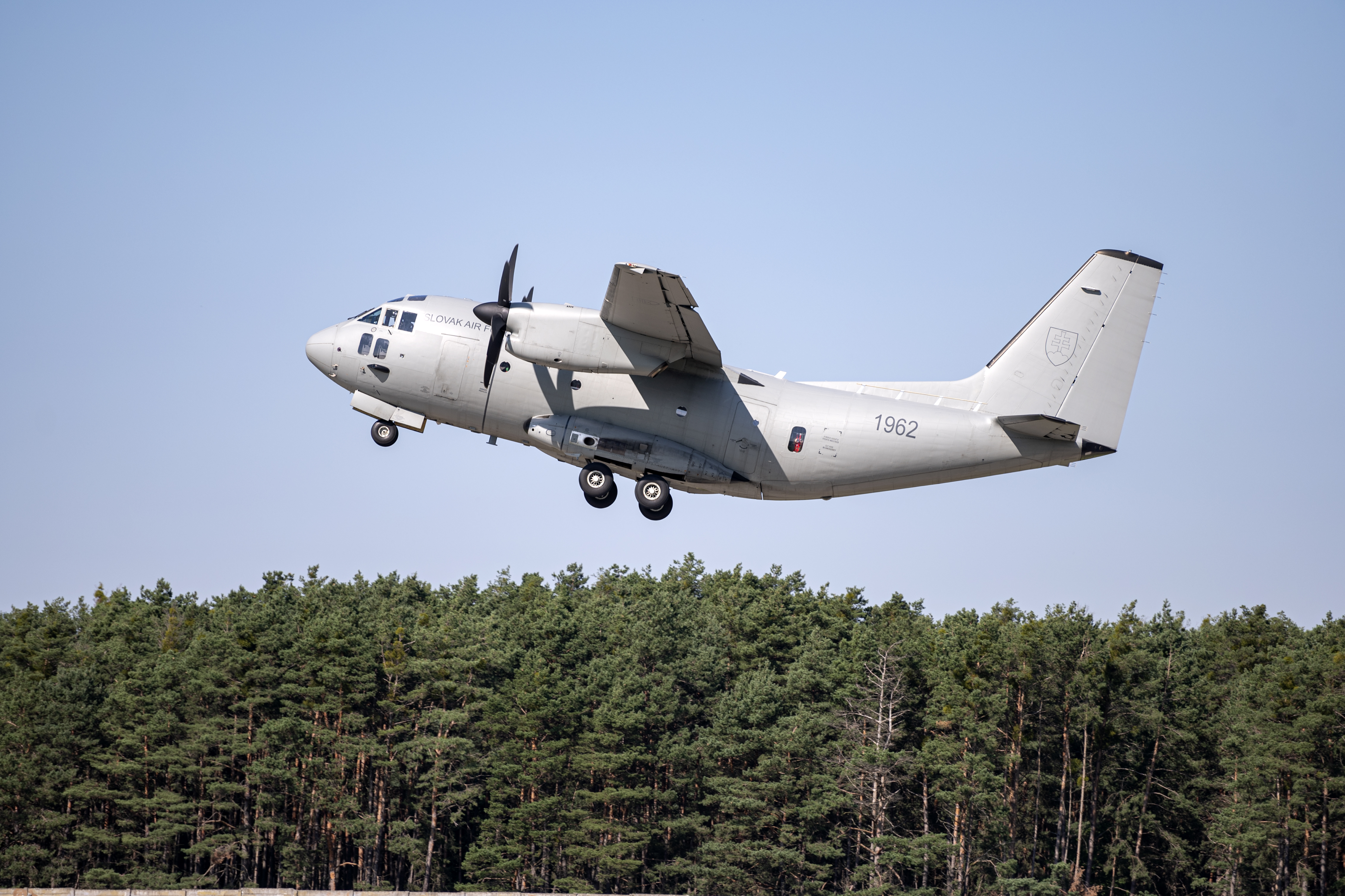
Slovak Air Force Alenia C-27J Spartan

== See also ==
- Slovak Air Force
- List of airports in Slovakia
