= International Fighter Pilots Academy =

The International Fighter Pilots Academy (IFPA) was originally established in the Slovak Republic in early 1993 as an official training unit (55 Squadron under the 5th Training Wing) permitting civilian visitors to participate in flying activities on operational military aircraft. The unit was originally formed to raise money for the "cash-strapped" Slovak Air Force. Aircraft available include jet fighters (L-39C, MIG-21UM, MIG-29UB) and helicopters (Mil Mi-2, Mil Mi-17, Mil Mi-24) at the various operational air bases of the Slovak Air Force (SAF).

The IFPA founder was an Australian Pilot – Thomas Orsos (Osterreicher), who was promoted to Commander of IFPA and awarded the honorary rank of Lt. Col. for services rendered to the Slovak Republic's Air Force (SAF) in operating "accident-free" operations of the IFPA unit for over 5 years and processing some 400+ visitor pilots.

At the end of 1997, the IFPA ceased operational status with the SAF, due to the SAF's ongoing operational demands for joint military exercise flying with NATO, therefore an alternative Air Force collaboration was sought.

In 1998, the IFPA was successfully transferred to become a newly incorporated official unit with the Ukrainian Air Force (UKRAF), and its new "home" became the Kirovskoye Air Base in the Crimea (Southern Ukraine by the Black Sea).

In 1999, authority was granted to the IFPA from the Ukrainian Air Force High Command to establish a new special training unit for international military personnel. This unit was designated the IFPA FIGHTER WEAPONS SCHOOL (IFWS). The IFPA-FWS quickly established itself as the No.1 venue for international military pilots desiring to fly with the state-of-the-art modern Russian-built Jet Fighters such as the MIG-29UB and SU-27UB all with fully operational radar and weapons (Air-to-air missile (AAM), Air-to-surface missile (ASM) ordnance.

By 2005 the IFPA had flown over 850 persons from all over the world and continues in operation to this day and has remained "accident-free". The IFPA's civilian-access No.1. Squadron's motto was: "Fly the Dream", and its military training No. 2. Squadron motto was: "You Fight Like You Train".

IFPA ceased its civilian-access and military flight operations in Ukraine in March 2014, when Russian Special Forces took over the Crimea region, including the Kirovskoye Air Base.By the time its stopped those flight operations, more than 1200 persons had flown or trained with IFPA at all its various Air Force Operations.IFPA Website (active)
