= Vajnory Airport =

Former airport of Bratislava, Slovakia (1923–2007)

Coordinates: 48°12′09″N 17°11′22″E

Vajnory Airport Letisko Vajnory
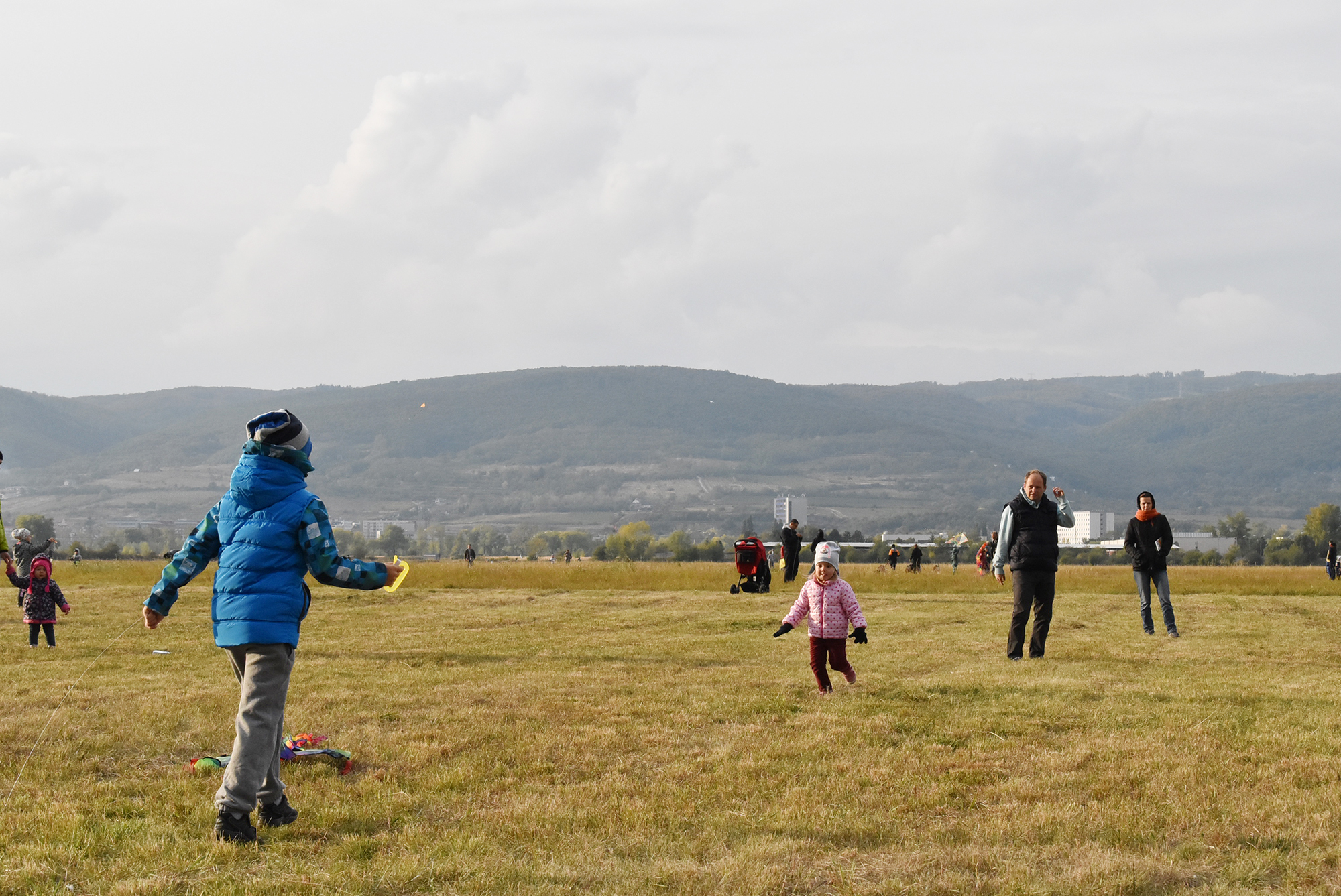
- IATA: none; ICAO: LZVB

Summary
- Airport type: Defunct
- Serves: Bratislava
- Location: Vajnory, Slovakia
- Opened: 29 October 1923
- Closed: January 2007
- Passenger services ceased: 1951
- Hub for: Czechoslovak Airlines (1923–1951)
- Interactive map of Vajnory Airport

Vajnory Airport (ICAO: LZVB) was an airfield located near the village of Vajnory, close to Slovakia's capital Bratislava. The airfield was opened in the early 1910s. On 4 May 1919, the Czechoslovak war minister Milan Rastislav Štefánik died during an unsuccessful landing attempt at the Vajnory airport. From 1923 to 1951, the airfield was used by the Czechoslovak Airlines for regular domestic flights to Prague. Afterward, it was replaced by the newly opened Milan Rastislav Štefánik Airport and only used by the local flying club. The airport was officially closed in January 2007.

On 21 July 2024, the airport served as the venue of an AC/DC concert, which made a record for the highest attendance of a musical event in the history of Slovakia, with over 100,000 people in attendance.

== See also ==
- List of airports in Slovakia
