= Prešov Air Base =

Prešov Air Base Letecká základňa Prešov
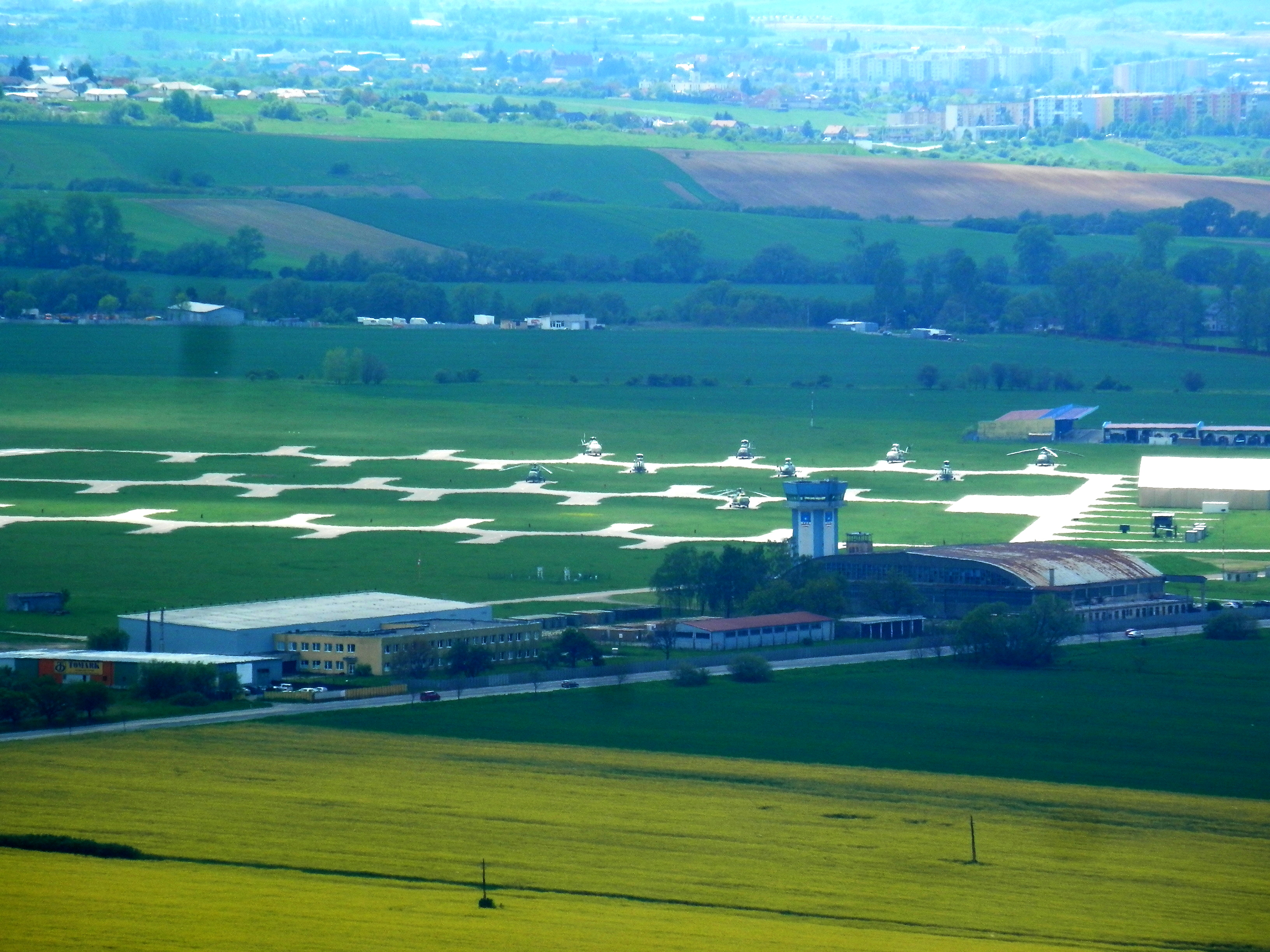
- IATA: POV; ICAO: LZPW

Summary
- Airport type: Military
- Owner: Slovak Armed Forces
- Operator: Slovak Air Force
- Location: Prešov, Slovakia
- Elevation AMSL: 1,053 ft / 321 m
- Coordinates: 49°01′47″N 21°18′56″E

Map
- Location of airport in Slovakia

Runways
Direction	Length		Surface
Direction	m	ft	Surface
05/23	850	2,789	grass

Prešov Air Base (IATA: POV, ICAO: LZPW) is a military airport located in Prešov, a city in the Prešov Region in Slovakia.

== Facilities ==
The airport resides at an elevation of 1,053 feet (321 m) above mean sea level. It has a runway which is 850 metres (2,789 ft) in length.

== See also ==
- Slovak Air Force
