= Slovak Air Force =

Air warfare branch of Slovakia's military

- Vzdušné sily Ozbrojených síl Slovenskej republiky
- Emblem of the Slovak Air Force
- Founded: 1 January 1993; 33 years ago
- Country: Slovakia
- Type: Air force
- Role: Aerial warfare
- Size: Approx 3,200 personnel; 22 aircraft; 15 helicopters
- Part of: Slovak Armed Forces
- Garrison/HQ: Zvolen

Commanders
- Air Force Commander: Brigade General Adolf Daubner

Insignia
- Roundel

Aircraft flown
- Fighter: F-16V Block 70
- Helicopter: UH-60M, Mil Mi-17
- Reconnaissance: L-410FG
- Trainer: Aero L-39CM/ZAM
- Transport: C-27J, Let L-410UVP

The Slovak Air Force, known since 2002 as the Air Force of the Armed Forces of the Slovak Republic (Slovak: Vzdušné sily Ozbrojených síl Slovenskej republiky), is the aviation and air defense branch of the Slovak Armed Forces. Operating 22 aircraft and 15 helicopters from three air bases, in Malacky, Sliač, Prešov. It succeeded the Czechoslovak Air Force together with the Czech Air Force in 1993. The Slovak Air Force is part of NATO Integrated Air Defense System – NATINADS.

The Slovak Air Force is tasked with the defense of the sovereignty of Slovakia and the support of the nation's ground troops. Following the retirement of the Mikoyan MiG-29s in 2022, 10 F-16 Block 70 and two L-39 Albatros provide the fast-jet capability role to the air force, awaiting the arrival of the final four F-16s in 2027. Six Let L-410 Turbolet aircraft provide surveillance and transport capabilities, while two C-27J Spartan transport aircraft provide a light tactical airlift capability. The helicopter fleet consists of four Mil Mi-17s which are accompanied by 11 much newer UH-60M Black Hawks.

The Slovak Air Force has been under the command of Brigade General Adolf Daubner since August 2025.

== History ==
=== 1914–1918 ===
Many Slovak pilots served in Austro-Hungarian Aviation Troops or in Entente air forces. Some Slovak pilots as part of Czechoslovak Legionnaires served even in the French Air Force or the Imperial Russian Air Service.

Jozef Kiss and Fritz Wowy were two of the best Slovak pilots in World War I.

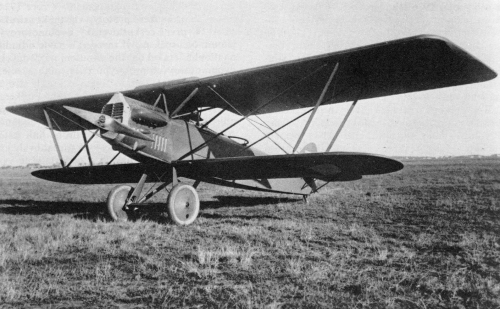
Aero A.30 light bomber and reconnaissance biplane of the Czechoslovak Air Force

=== 1918–1939 ===
Much of Austria-Hungary's manufacturing companies were Czech, therefore Czechoslovakia could quickly develop an aircraft industry. As the industry developed, it designed more aircraft and engines of its own. Czechoslovak aircraft builders included Aero, Avia, Beneš-Mráz, Letov, Praga, Tatra and Zlín. Engine makers included ČKD, Walter and Škoda.

=== 1939–1945 ===
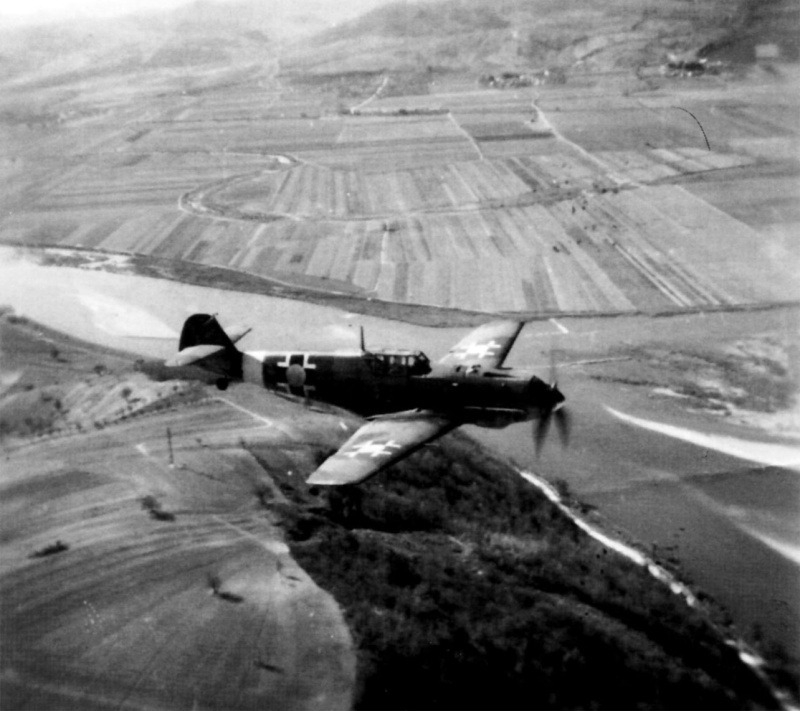
Messerschmitt Bf 109E of the Slovak Air Force during World War II

After the division of Czechoslovakia by Nazi Germany in 1939, Slovakia was left with a small air force composed primarily of Czechoslovak combat aircraft. This force defended Slovakia against Hungary in 1939, and took part in the invasion of Poland in support of Germany. During World War II, the Slovak Air force was tasked with the defense of Slovak airspace, and, after the invasion of Russia, provided air cover for Slovak forces fighting against the Soviet Union on the Eastern Front. While engaged on the Eastern Front, Slovakia's obsolete biplanes were replaced with German combat aircraft, like the Messerschmitt Bf 109. The air force was sent back to Slovakia after combat fatigue and desertion had reduced the pilots' effectiveness. The Slovak Resistance Air Force took part in the Slovak National Uprising against Germany from late August 1944.

=== 1945–1992 ===
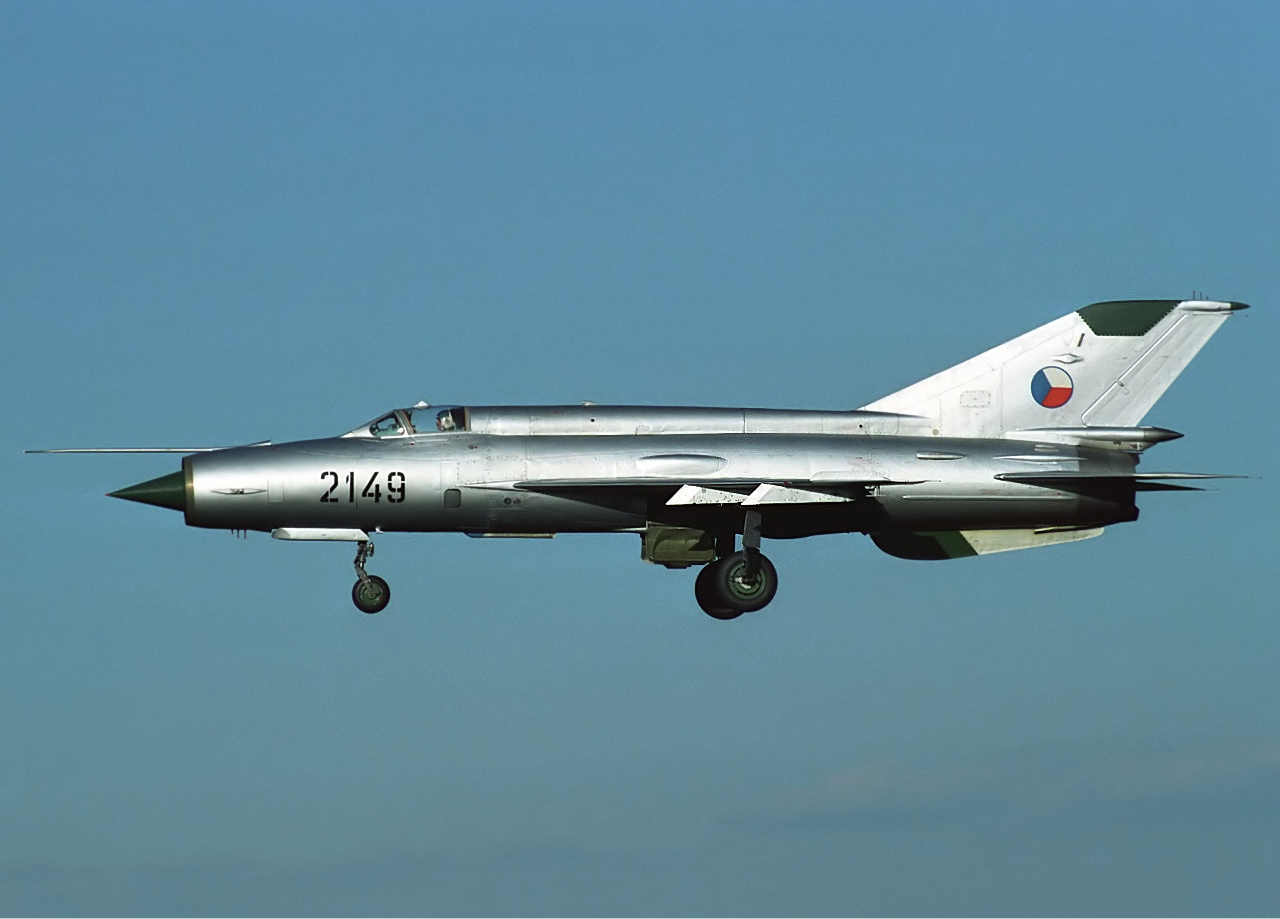
Retired MiG-21R of the Czechoslovak Air Force

During this time Czechoslovakia was a member of the Eastern Bloc, allied with the Soviet Union, and from 1955 a member of the Warsaw Pact. As a result of this, the Czechoslovak Air Force used Soviet aircraft, doctrines, and tactics. The types of aircraft used were mostly MiGs. MiG-15, MiG-19, and MiG-21F fighters were produced in license; in the 1970s, MiG-23MFs were bought, accompanied by MiG-23MLs and MiG-29s in the 1980s.

During the 1980s and early 1990s, the Czechoslovak Air Force consisted of the 7th Air Army, which had air defense duties, and the 10th Air Army, responsible for ground forces support. The 7th Air Army had two air divisions and three fighter regiments, and the 10th Air Army had two air divisions and a total of six regiments of fighters and attack aircraft. There were also two reconnaissance regiments, two transport regiments, three training regiments, and two helicopter regiments.

=== 1993–2022 ===
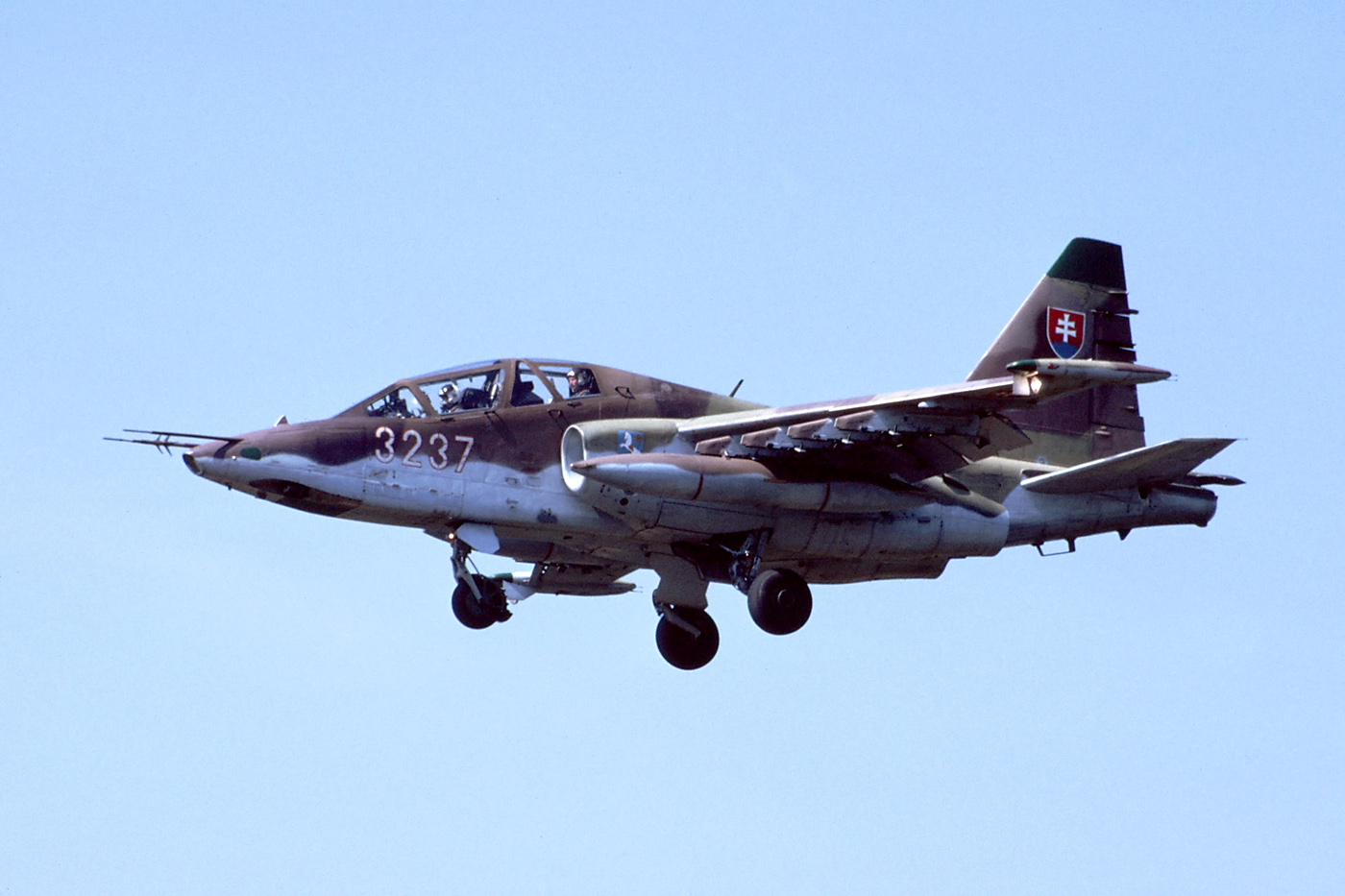
Retired subsonic jet aircraft - Sukhoi Su-25UBK of the Slovak Air Force

After the formal dissolution of Czechoslovakia on 31 December 1992, Czechoslovak aircraft were divided according to each nation's population, or in a ratio of nearly 2:1 in the Czech Republic's favor. The exceptions to this rule were the MiG-23s, which were given exclusively to the Czech Air Force, and the MiG-29s, which were divided evenly between the two nations. Slovak air bases were initially under-equipped to handle the aircraft transferred from the Czech air bases, and required considerable improvements in infrastructure to facilitate the new air force.

Following the division of aircraft, on 1 March 1995, the air force replaced the Soviet style aviation regiment organization with the western wing and squadron system. Then around 2000–2002, Slovakia started to gradually retire many of the older aircraft, including their entire fleet of Su-22, Su-25, and MiG-21. This was followed by the disbanding of the national aerobatic demonstration team, the Biele Albatrosy, and the merge of the Military aviation academy with the Faculty of Aeronautics at the Technical University of Košice. A tragic crash involving a Slovak Air Force An-24 in 2006 became the country's worst military aviation accident in history, with only one out of the 43 people on board surviving. As a part of its gradual retirement of Soviet aircraft, all remaining Mil Mi-24 attack helicopters were retired on 20 September 2011.

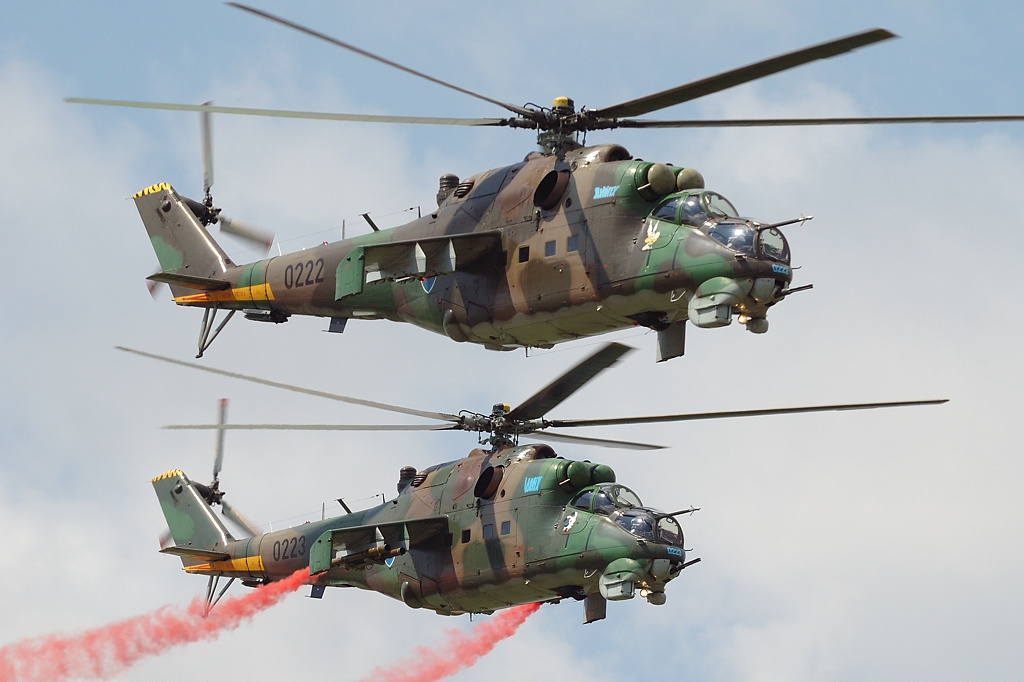
Retired Mil Mi-24s of the Slovak Air Force

Modernization efforts began in October 2014, when the government approved the purchase of two tactical transport aircraft, the Alenia C-27J Spartan. Slovakia was one of the few countries in Eastern Europe that decided to keep its MiG-29's in service, but in January 2014, Slovakia started discussions with the Swedish Government regarding leasing or purchasing JAS-39 Gripen aircraft to replace their MiG-29 fighters. However, these negotiations didn't lead anywhere and Slovakia decided to keep their MiG-29s in service until 2022. In April 2015, the Slovak government announced it would buy nine UH-60M utility helicopters to replace its aging fleet of Mi-17 helicopters. The deal worth $261 million also included full life-cycle support for the aircraft and training for aircrews and ground personnel.

One of the most significant milestones in the modernization of the Air Force was achieved on 12 December 2018, when Slovakia signed a contract to acquire 14 F-16V/Block 70 with additional equipment. Originally, all were to be delivered by 2025, but due to delays and the COVID-19 pandemic deliveries began years later. The first completed jet was unveiled by the manufacturer on 7 September 2023, and first two aircraft were delivered to Slovakia on 22 July 2024. The last aircraft was handed over to Slovak pilots in the United States in April 2026 and it along with the other three aircraft still in the U.S. are expected to arrive once their training is complete in 2027.

=== 2022-present ===
Following the Russian invasion of Ukraine in February 2022, in March, Germany and the Netherlands deployed their Patriot air defense systems in Slovakia to complement Slovakia's air defense. Then in April, Slovakia donated its one and only S-300PMU battery. This was soon followed by the donation of one Mil Mi-2 and four Mil Mi-17 helicopters in June.

The conflict in Azerbaijan and the war in Ukraine have both proved the effectiveness of drones, so back in April, Slovakia began negotiating with Baykar about the procurement of Bayraktar TB2. These negotiations been never formally ended. Then on 31 August 2022, all MiG-29s operated by the Slovak Air Force were retired. An agreement with fellow NATO members Poland and the Czech Republic was signed in order to establish joint patrols of airspace, until the delivery of American F-16s to the Slovak Air Force. After their MIM-104 Patriot systems left Slovakia, Germany offered to protect Slovakia's airspace.

One of the most significant donations of military equipment to Ukraine occurred on 17 March 2023 when the Slovak government approved sending 13 Mikoyan MiG-29 fighter jets to Ukraine and one MiG-29UBS to Military History Museum Piešťany. Nine MiG-29AS, one MiG-29UBS, two MiG-29A and one MiG-29UB were sent to Ukraine. Three of them were missing engines and were intended to serve as a source of spare parts. Ukrainian pilots flew four MiG-29 jet fighters from Slovakia to Ukraine on 23 March 2023, with the remaining nine sent at a later date. However, the MiG-29s weren't the only military equipment sent, additionally, two 2K12 Kub launchers, one 1S91 radar, spare parts, 52 3M9ME missiles and 148 3M9M3E missiles were donated.

==== Russian sabotage of Slovak MiG-29s ====
Chief of the General Staff of the Slovak Armed Forces, General Daniel Zmeko was critical of the Slovak MiG-29s in their last years. There were problems with spare parts and maintenance, which was outsourced to Russia. This resulted in four air frames being airworthy on average, while still being plagued by a high failure rate, with a failure occurring roughly every 43 minutes on average. Additionally, a lack of munitions, no modernization since 1996, and a lack of pilots for the old fighter jets ultimately led to their retiring.

Russian technicians were suspected of sabotage, as per statement from the Minister of Defense Jaroslav Naď. Due to unusual failures occurring on parts serviced only by Russian personnel, as well as other issues with spare parts, a criminal investigation was launched. While the police could not prove Russia did it on purpose, the findings were enough for the Slovak Army to lose their trust in Russian maintenance crews. The deal with Russia for servicing the jet fighters resulted in a cost of €70,000 per flight hour, more than double the cost of the state of the art 5th generation F-35 Lightning II jet fighter.

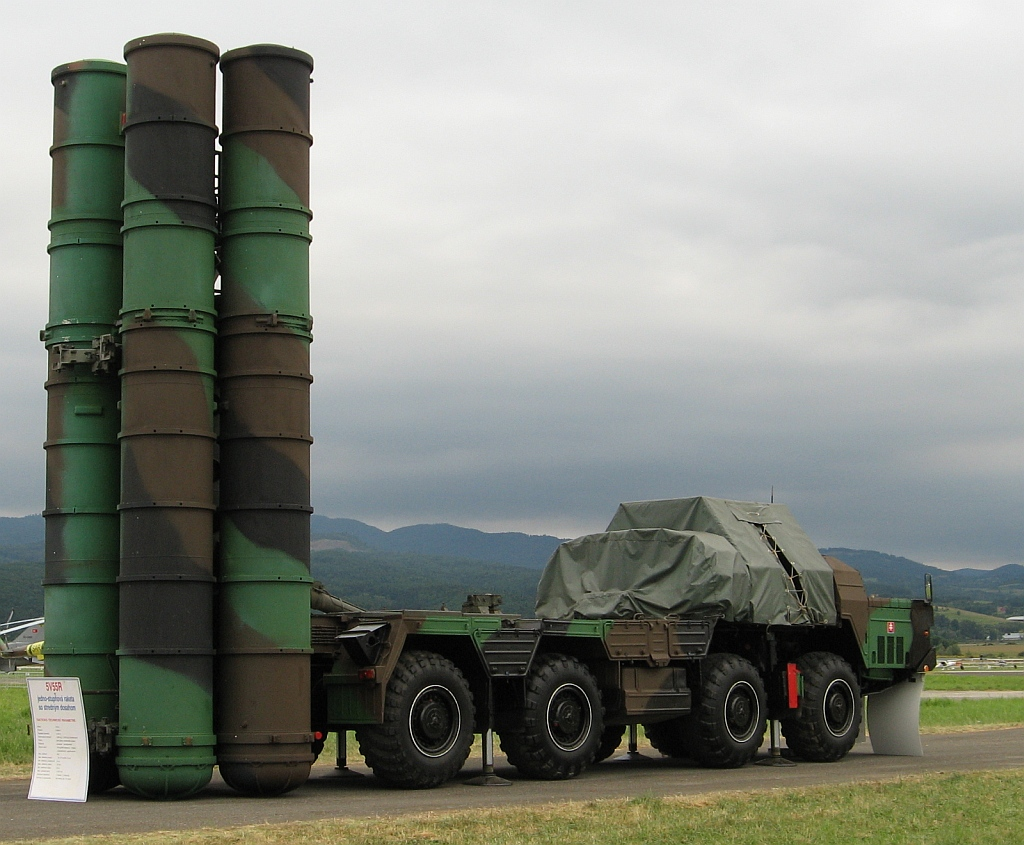
S-300PMU surface-to-air missile system of the Slovak Air Force that was given to Ukraine as military aid.

Modernization of the country's air defense began on 13 October 2022, when Slovakia joined the European Sky Shield Initiative to strengthen future air defense procurement. In September of the following year, Slovakia started the acquisition of medium and short range air defense missile systems (SHORAD/MRAD) with budget of 200 million Euros. The acquisition of these systems was part of the first out of three stages. Among the medium-range systems, Slovakia was choosing from the Barak 8, SPYDER, IRIS-T and MICA. From short-range systems Slovakia was choosing between Piorun, RBS 70, Mistral 3 and KP-SAM Chiron. On February 7, 2024, Slovakia was comparing NASAMS, IRIS-T, KM-SAM with the winners of the past tender Barak 8. A few months later in August, the Slovak government approved plans to buy six Barak MX batteries from Israel. There are speculations that two additional batteries could be ordered as well.

Talks and negotiations with the United States surrounding the purchase of four more F-16s began in February 2026. In the transport department, the Slovak Air Force already has six Czech-made L-410 light aircraft, with four of them being the relatively new L-410UVP-E20 version, in addition to two twin-engine turboprop C-27J Spartan transport aircraft. These aircraft will be retired or offered either for sale or exchange. The Ministry of Defense of the Slovak Republic proposes the procurement of two new twin-engine jets to replace the L-410, and the purchase of four Brazilian Embraer C-390 Millennium is also expected. Slovakia decided to procure two more UH-60 Black Hawks for its special forces. Those two Black Hawks were delivered on 25 August 2026 at Malacky Air Base, and they were later transferred to 51st wing in Prešov. This added to the fleet of nine UH-60M helicopters that the Air Force was already operating.

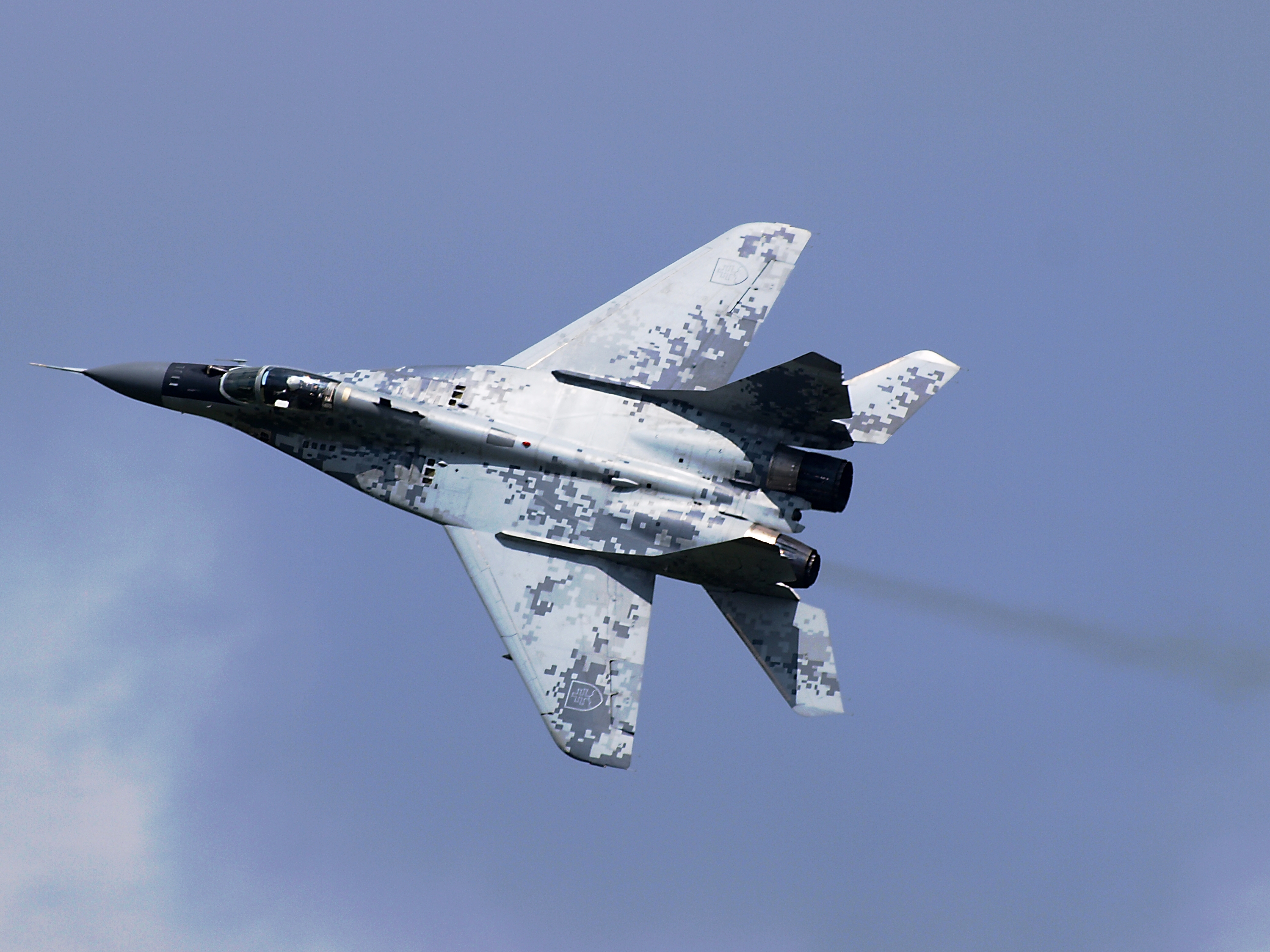
A retired upgraded multirole fighter aircraft MiG-29AS that has since been donated to Ukraine

=== Compensation for military aid ===
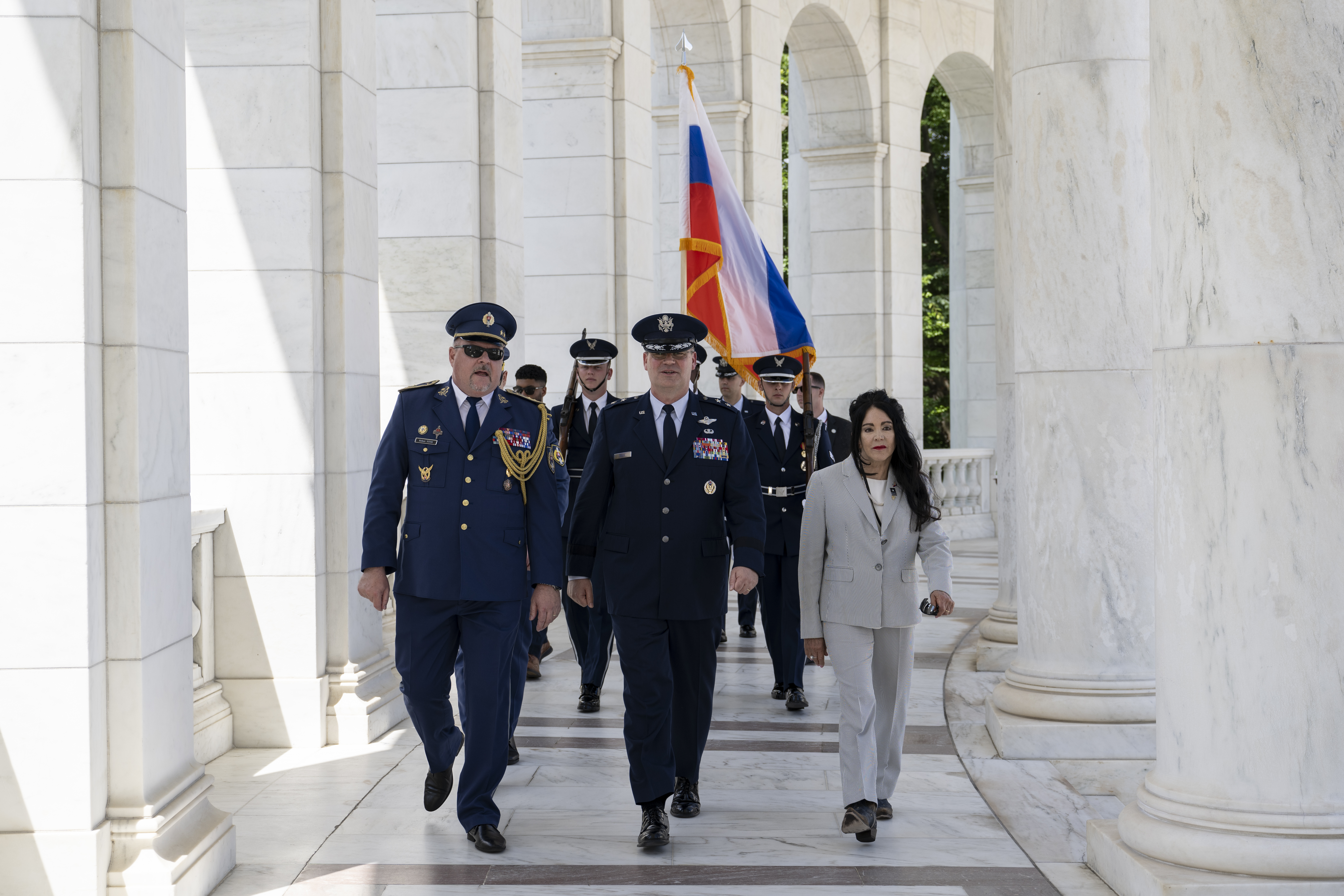
The Commander of the Slovak Air Force Major general Róbert Tóth (left) visits the United States in June 2024

As compensation for the aid provided, Slovakia received €200 million for the MiG-29 package and €50 million for the KUB package, both from the European Peace Facility fund. The US offered aid in the form of an approximately 66% discount on a package including 12 unused AH-1Z attack helicopters, training, related equipment and 500 Hellfire II missiles. The total value of the package was estimated at US$1 billion, with $660 million to be paid by the FMF. Had the Slovak government accepted the offer, the remaining value of the package, in the amount of $340 million, was to be paid by the Slovak government in three to four years. The total value of the compensation from both the EU and US is approximately $900 million per statement from Ministry of Defense of Slovak Republic. The AH-1Z offer was also provided as a compensation in the context of the delays to Slovak F-16C/D delivery. The Slovak government was expected to make a decision on the AH-1Z offer early into 2024. The signing of the deal was threatened due to the change in government after the elections.

== Organization ==
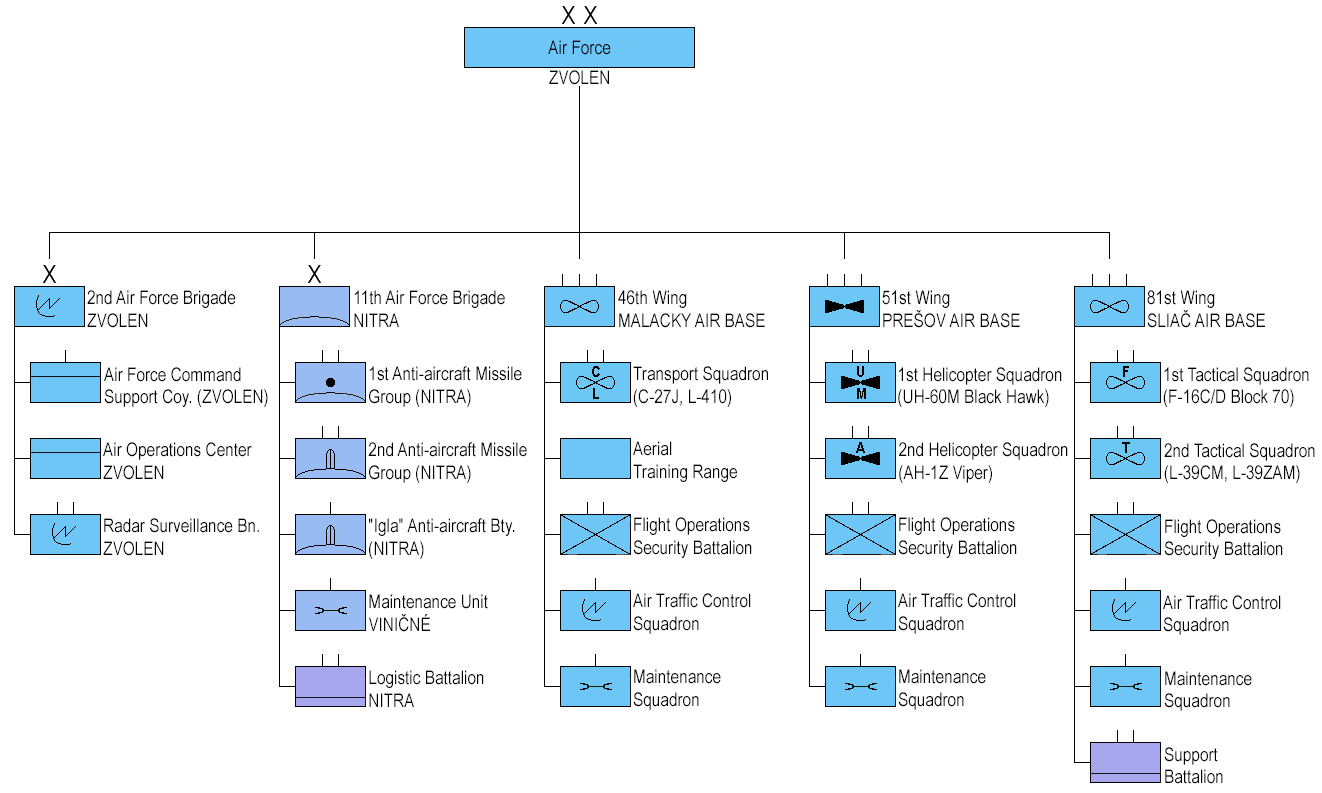
Slovak Air Force organization as of April 2026

Slovak Air Force locations 2024:
Air bases: Fighters Helicopters Transport planes
Other units: Air Defense Air Operations Center Radar stations
- Air Force Command, in Zvolen
  - 2nd Air Force Brigade, in Zvolen
    - Air Operations Center, in Zvolen (part of NATO's NATO Integrated Air Defense System)
    - Radar Surveillance Battalion, in Zvolen (6× EL/M-2084M-MMR, 5× ELM-2084S-MMR/GBAD, 6× ELM-2138M MC radars on order)
      - Command and Support Company, in Zvolen
      - 1st Radar Surveillance Company, in Michalovce
      - 2nd Radar Surveillance Company, in Veľká Ida
      - 3rd Radar Surveillance Company, in Ožďany
      - 4th Radar Surveillance Company, in Močiar
      - 5th Radar Surveillance Company, in Hlohovec
      - 6th Radar Surveillance Company, in Mierovo
      - 7th Radar Engineering Company, in Prešov
      - 8th Radar Engineering Company, in Voderady
    - Air Force Command Support Company
    - Medical Point
  - 11th Air Force Brigade, in Nitra
    - 1st Anti-aircraft Missile Group
      - 2× batteries, with MANTIS systems
    - 2nd Anti-aircraft Missile Group
      - 3× batteries, with 2K12 Kub-M2
    - "Igla" Anti-aircraft Battery, with 54× 9K38 Igla MANPADS
    - Logistic Battalion
    - Maintenance Unit, in Viničné
    - Operating Unit, on Kolíňanský vrch
    - Medical Point
  - 46th Wing, at Malacky Air Base
    - Transport Squadron, with 2× C-27J Spartan, 1× L-410FG, 1× L-410UVP-E14, 4× L-410UVP-E20
    - Flight Operations Security Battalion
    - Air Traffic Control Squadron
    - Maintenance Squadron
    - Aerial Training Range
    - Medical Point
  - 51st Wing, at Prešov Air Base
    - 1st Helicopter Squadron, with 11× UH-60M
    - 2nd Helicopter Squadron, with 2× Mi-17M, 2× Mi-17LPZS (will likely be replaced by 12× UH-60L that were ordered)
    - Flight Operations Security Battalion
    - Air Traffic Control Squadron
    - Maintenance Squadron
    - Medical Point
  - 81st Wing, at Sliač Air Base
    - 1st Tactical Squadron, with 12× F-16C Block 70, 2× F-16D Block 70 (4 on order)
    - 2nd Tactical Squadron, with 1× L-39CM, 1× L-39ZAM
    - Support Battalion
    - Flight Operations Security Battalion
    - Air Traffic Control Squadron
    - Maintenance Squadron
    - Medical Point

=== 81st Wing "Sliač Air Base" ===
The 81st Wing Air Base should function as standard base for all fighter aircraft as well as trainer aircraft of Slovak Air Force. However, currently due to the reconstruction of the base, all aircraft were relocated to 46th Wing. Once the reconstruction of the base is completed, it will once again host fighter and trainer jets such as the F-16 Block 70 and the L-39.

=== 46th Wing "Dopravné krídlo Milana Rastislava Štefánika" ===
At the moment, the 46th Wing is the only active air base of Slovak Air Force that is able to host fighter jets as well as subsonic aircraft. However, it is meant to be the home for all transport aircraft such as the Alenia C-27J Spartan and the Let L-410 Turbolet.

=== 51st Wing "Prešov Air Base" ===
The 51st Wing is the home base for all helicopters of the Slovak Air Force, which also includes a helicopter repair company. The air base operates 15 helicopters, four Mil Mi-17 and 11 Sikorsky UH-60M Black Hawks.

=== 2nd Air Force Brigade ===
The 2nd Air Force Brigade is the Air Force Command Brigade of the Slovak Air Force and it is based in Zvolen. The brigade is a part of the NATO Integrated Air and Missile Defense System (NATINAMDS).

Tasks

- Completion of Air Policing tasks within NATINAMDS;
- Implementation of active command and control of the Air Force of the Slovak Armed Forces;
- Collection, processing, and distribution of information for the needs of the Air Force Command and higher levels of NATO.

=== 11th Air Force Brigade ===
The 11th Air Force Brigade is in charge of protecting military objects, critical infrastructure and civilian objects. It is the "air defense brigade" that fields a variety of air defense systems from the Barak MX, to the 2K12 Kub and even the MANTIS.

== Aircraft ==
=== Current inventory ===
Aircraft	Origin	Type	Variant	In service	Notes
Combat aircraft
F-16C/D Block 70	United States	Multirole	F-16C F-16D	9 1 (4 on order)	All aircraft from the initial order have been delivered to the Slovak Air Force.; The four aircraft from the initial order are still based in the USA for training.; Slovakia ordered four more F-16D Block 70 in September 2026.
Transport
Alenia C-27J	Italy	Transport	C-27J	2	
L-410 Turbolet	Czech Republic	Transport Reconnaissance	L-410UVP-E L-410FG	5 1	
Bombardier Global 5000	Canada	Business jet / Medevac	G5000	2	Being used for medevac.
Helicopters
Mil Mi-17	Soviet Union	Utility Search and rescue	Mi-17M Mi-17 LPZS	2 2	-
UH-60 Black Hawk	United States	Utility	UH-60M UH-60L	11 0/12	2 UH-60M helicopters were delivered in August 2026.; 12 UH-60L on order.
Trainer aircraft
Aero L-39	Czech Republic	Jet trainer/Light attack	L-39CM L-39ZAM	1 1	The L-39CM is a modernized trainer variant while the L-39ZAM is a modernized light attack variant.; As of 2024, there are only two airworthy L-39s, one L-39CM and one L-39ZAM.
UAVs
Elbit Skylark	Israel	UAV	I-LEX	1 system (3 drones)	In 2017, Slovakia ordered one Skylark I-LEX system, which consisted of 3 air vehicles (UAVs), 2 daytime cameras, and 1 night camera to replace 3 older Skylark I-LE.; Assigned to the 5th Special Forces Regiment.

Note: Five Northrop Grumman RQ-4 Global Hawks are available through the Alliance Ground Surveillance (AGS) program based in Italy.

Aircraft of the Slovak Air Force
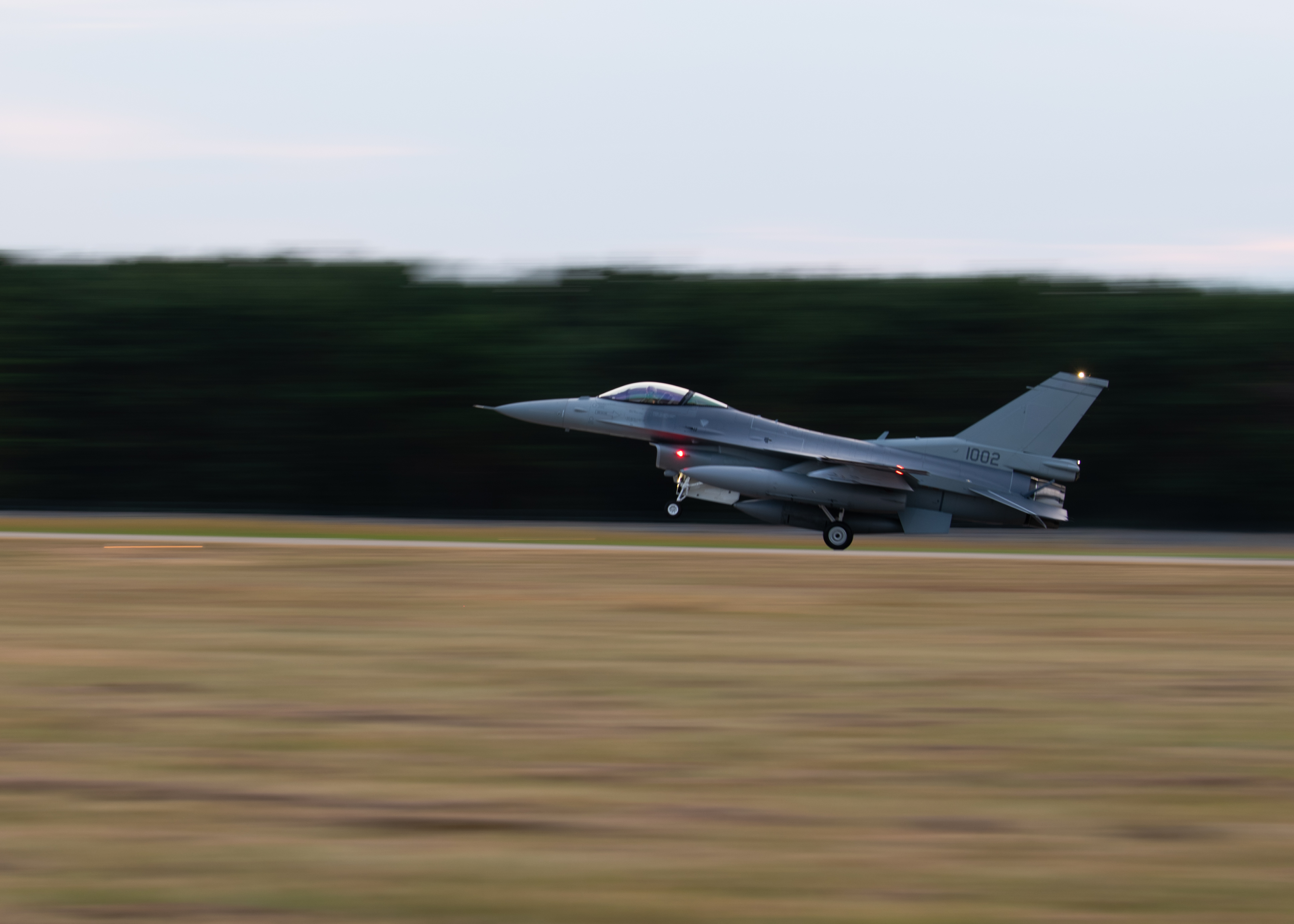
The first Slovak F-16C Block 70 arriving at Malacky Air Base.

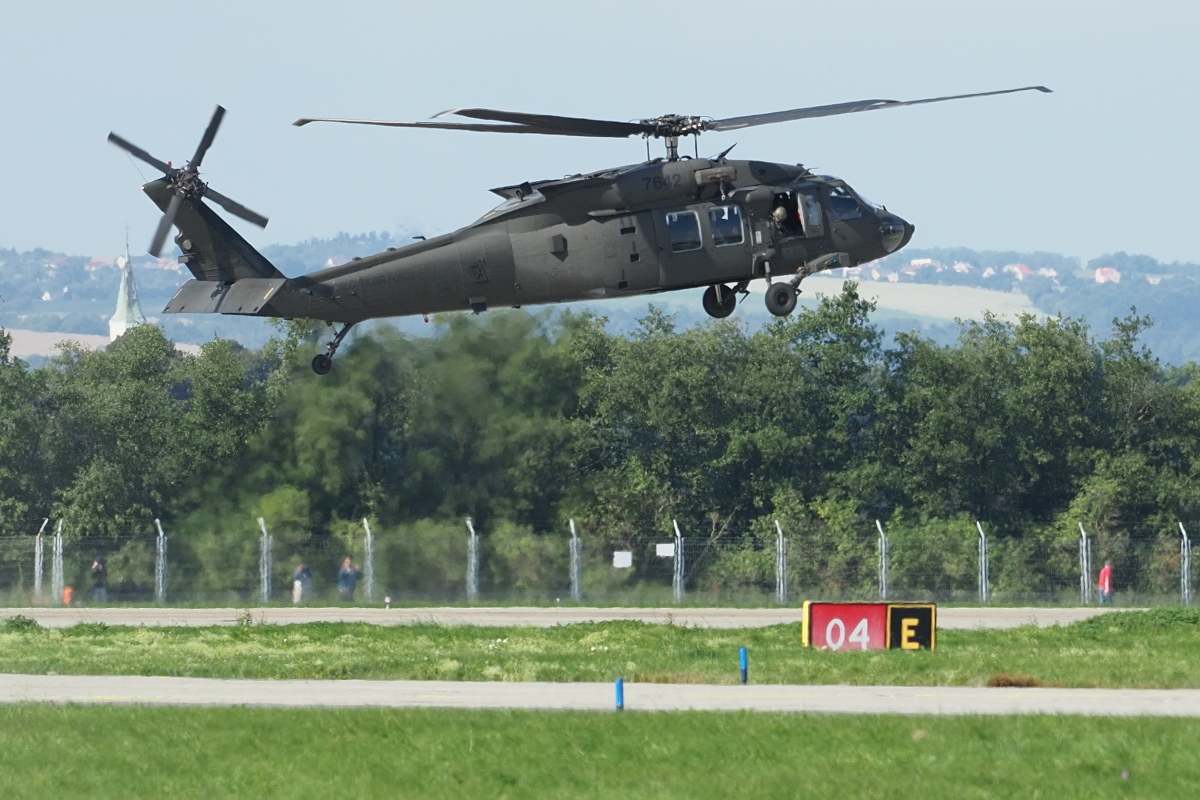
A Slovak Air Force UH-60M Black Hawk

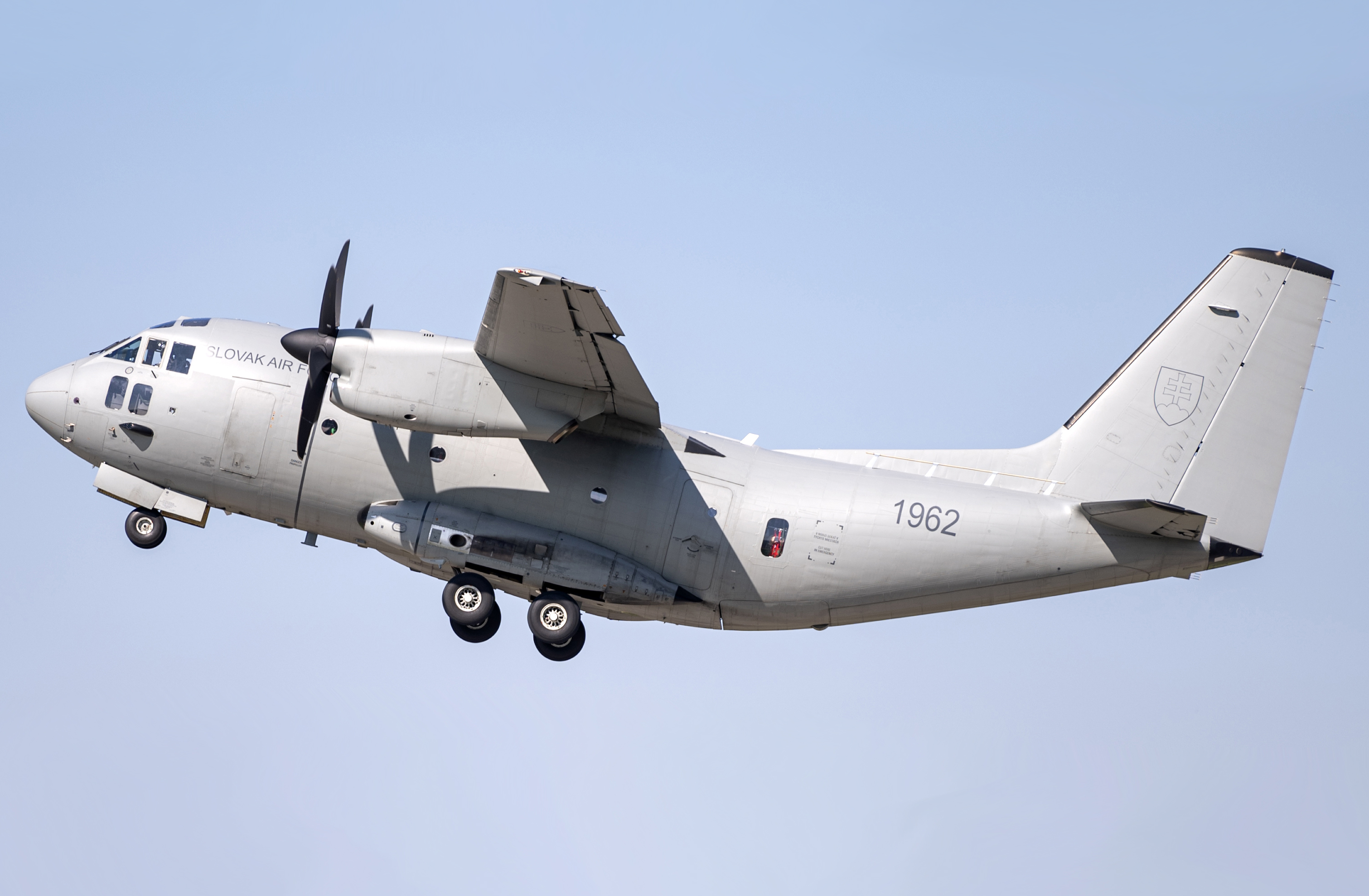
A Slovak Air Force C-27J taking off

=== Aircraft armament ===
Name	Origin	Type	Quantity	Notes
Air-to-air missiles
AIM-120-C7 AMRAAM	United States	Beyond-visual-range missile	28	Total of 28 missiles were bought.
AIM-9X Sidewinder	United States	Short-range air-to-air missile	98	98 missiles were bought in a later contract.
R-60	Soviet Union	Short-range air-to-air missile	?	Unknown number in storage.
Rockets
S-5 rocket	Soviet Union	Unguided rocket	?	Used by Mi-17M.
Cannons
M61 Vulcan	United States	Rotary cannon	15	Total of 15 bought for the F-16s.
GSh-23L	Soviet Union	Autocannon	?	Mounted on L-39ZAM.
Machine guns
M240H	United States	Machine guns	?	Mounted on UH-60 Black Hawks.
Unguided bombs
Mark 82	United States	Unguided bomb	324	Total of 324 bombs bought for F-16.
Precision-guided munition
GBU-12 Paveway II	United States	Laser-guided bomb	212	Total of 212 bombs bought for F-16.
GBU-38	United States	GPS guided bomb	150	Total of 150 kits bought for F-16.
GBU-49	United States	GPS and laser-guided	20	Total of 20 bombs bought for F-16.
GBU-54 LJDAM	United States	GPS and laser-guided	50	Total of 50 kits bought for F-16.
Other equipment
AN/AAQ-33 Sniper Targeting Pod	United States	Targeting pod	6	Total of 6 Sniper pods were bought.
LAU-129	United States	Missile rail launcher	60	Total of 60 launchers were bought.

=== Former aircraft ===
Aircraft	Country of Origin	Type	Variant	Quantity	Period of Service	Notes
Fighter aircraft						
Mikoyan-Gurevich MiG-21	Soviet Union	Fighter aircraft Reconnaissance aircraft Jet trainer/fighter aircraft	MiG-21MA MiG-21MF MiG-21R MiG-21UM MiG-21US	13 36 8 11 2	1993 – 2003	
Mikoyan MiG-29	Soviet Union	Fighter aircraft Jet trainer/fighter aircraft	MiG-29A MiG-29UB	21 3	1993 – 2022	
Attack aircraft						
Sukhoi Su-22	Soviet Union	Fighter-bomber Jet trainer/attack aircraft	Su-22M4 Su-22UM-3K	18 3	1993 – 2002	
Sukhoi Su-25	Soviet Union	Close air support Jet trainer/attack aircraft	Su-25K Su-25UBK	12 1	1993 – 2002	12 Su-25K and one Su-25UBK inherited from Czechoslovakia; Nine Su-25K and one Su-25UBK were sold to Armenia in 2004 for 34 million Slovak crowns.; One Su-25K is displayed in Piešťany Military History Museum, and another Su-25K is displayed at the Museum of Aviation in Košice.
Transport aircraft						
Antonov An-12	Soviet Union	Tactical transport aircraft	An-12BP	1	1993 – 1999	
Antonov An-24	Soviet Union	Tactical transport aircraft	An-24V	2	1993 – 2006	
Antonov An-26	Soviet Union	Tactical transport aircraft	An-26B-100	2	1993 – 2016	
Yakovlev Yak-40	Soviet Union	Transport aircraft (for passengers)	Yak-40	1	1993 – 1999	
Tupolev Tu-154	Soviet Union	Transport aircraft (VIP)	Tu-154B-2	1	1993 – 1995	
Trainer aircraft						
Aero L-29 Delfín	Czechoslovakia	Jet trainer	L-29	16	1993 – 2003	
Aero L-39 Albatros	Czechoslovakia	Jet trainer Jet trainer and light attack aircraft Target tower	L-39C L-39ZA L-39V	7 8 2	1993 – ?	A total of 19 L-39s (eight L-39C, and nine L-39ZA, and two L-39V) were inherited from the Czechoslovak Air Force.; Six L-39Cs were modernized to L-39CMs and six L-39ZAs were modernized to L-39ZAMs.
Aero L-59 Super Albatros	Czechoslovakia	Jet trainer and light attack aircraft	L-39MS	2	1993 – ?	
Helicopters						
Mil Mi-2	Soviet Union; Poland	Light helicopter	Mi-2	17	1993 – 2013	
Mil Mi-8	Soviet Union	Electronic warfare VIP Transport Transport helicopter	Mi-8PPA Mi-8PS Mi-8T	1 2 6	1993 – 2011	
Mil Mi-24	Soviet Union	Attack helicopter Attack helicopter Training helicopter	Mi-24D Mi-24V Mi-24DU	8 10 1	1993 – 2011	

Previous aircraft operated include the MiG-21, MiG-29, Sukhoi Su-22, Sukhoi Su-25, Aero L-29, Antonov An-12, Antonov An-24, Antonov An-26, Mil Mi-2, and the Mil Mi-24 helicopters.

== Air defense ==
=== Surface-to-air missile systems ===
Name	Image	Origin	In service	Notes
Barak MX		Israel	1 battery	Five more batteries on order. Two additional batteries could be ordered later.; 18 launchers total that can fire interceptors with 45 km, 75 km, and a 150 km range.; The delivery is late because of the 2026 Iran war.
2K12 Kub M2		Soviet Union	3 batteries	Two launchers with additional equipment were donated to Ukraine in 2022.; Three and a half batteries are in an operational state as of 2026.
9K38 Igla		Soviet Union	54	It was supposed to be replaced by the Piorun, but no MANPADS were ordered yet.

=== C-RAM ===
Name	Image	Origin	In service	Notes
MANTIS		Germany	2 systems	Two systems donated by Germany were delivered to the 11th Air Force Brigade. They are guarding the eastern border of Slovakia with Ukraine.

=== Radars ===
Name	Origin	Type	Range	Quantity	Notes
ELM-2084 M-MMR	Israel	Multi-mission AESA radar	350 km	1/6	Six were ordered in 2021, but deliveries were significantly delayed. Originally they were meant to be delivered between 2023 and 2025, but the first one arrived in July 2026.; Mounted on a Tatra 815-7 truck.
ELM-2084 MS MMR	Israel	Multi-sensor, multi-mission AESA radar	150 km	0/5	Five were ordered in 2021, but deliveries have been significantly delayed.
ELM-2138M Green Rock	Israel	C-RAM AESA radar	50 km	0/6	Six were ordered in 2021, but deliveries have been significantly delayed.
LÜR	Germany	Airspace surveillance radar	100 km	5	Five radars were donated by Germany alongside two MANTIS systems as compensation for the S-300PMU battery that Slovakia sent to Ukraine as aid.
1S91	Soviet Union	Short/medium range radar	50 km	12	Part of the 2K12 Kub system in service.
VERA-NG	Czech Republic	Passive surveillance system	-	1	Bought in 2023 for 21.95 million euros.; It is being used for airspace surveillance.
P-37 radar	Soviet Union	Early-warning radar	~320 km	9	Slovakia operates a handful of a modernized version of the P-37 called the P-37MSK. It incorporates a NATO-compatible IFF system, and was aimed to bring the P-37 radars up to the 1L117 standard.
RPL-2000	Czech Republic	Airport surveillance radar	-	1	One system at Malacky Air Base.; Planned deployment at Prešov Air Base and Sliač Air Base after its reconstruction.

== Ranks ==
=== Commissioned officer ranks ===
The rank insignia of commissioned officers.

NATO code	OF-10	OF-9	OF-8	OF-7	OF-6	OF-5	OF-4	OF-3	OF-2	OF-1
(Slovakia) Slovak Air Force
(Slovakia) Slovak Air Force		Generál	Generálporučík (Note: The appropriate branch of service badge is pinned just under the top button of the for all ranks excluding full General.)	Generálmajor	Brigádny generál	Plukovník	Podplukovník	Major	Kapitán	Nadporučík	Poručík

=== Other ranks ===
The rank insignia of non-commissioned officers and enlisted personnel.

NATO code	OR-9	OR-8	OR-7	OR-6	OR-5	OR-4	OR-3	OR-2	OR-1
(Slovakia) Slovak Air Force
(Slovakia) Slovak Air Force	Štábny nadrotmajster	Nadrotmajster	Rotmajster	Rotný	Čatár	Desiatnik	Slobodník	Vojak 2. stupňa	Vojak 1. stupňa

== Aircraft markings ==
The Slovak aircraft marking is a set made of shield with national cross on three hills which point towards the belly of aircraft. They are the same color as the Slovak flag, red, white, and blue. It appears on the side of helicopters and on both sides of the wings and tail of aircraft. New F-16 Fighting Falcon fighter aircraft wear a NATO standard compliant grey-on-grey (low-visibility) version of the Slovak Air Force insignia.

Roundel of First Czechoslovak Republic (1918–1920)

First roundel of Slovak Insurgents (1939–1944)

Roundel of first Slovak Republic Air Force (1941–1945)

Roundel of Slovak Insurgent Air Force (1944–1945)

Roundel of Czechoslovak Socialist Republic (1945–1993)

Slovak Air Force roundel (1993–)

Slovak Air Force low visibility version (2004–)

== See also ==
- International Fighter Pilots Academy
- Ground Forces of the Slovak Republic
