= Vajnory =

- Borough
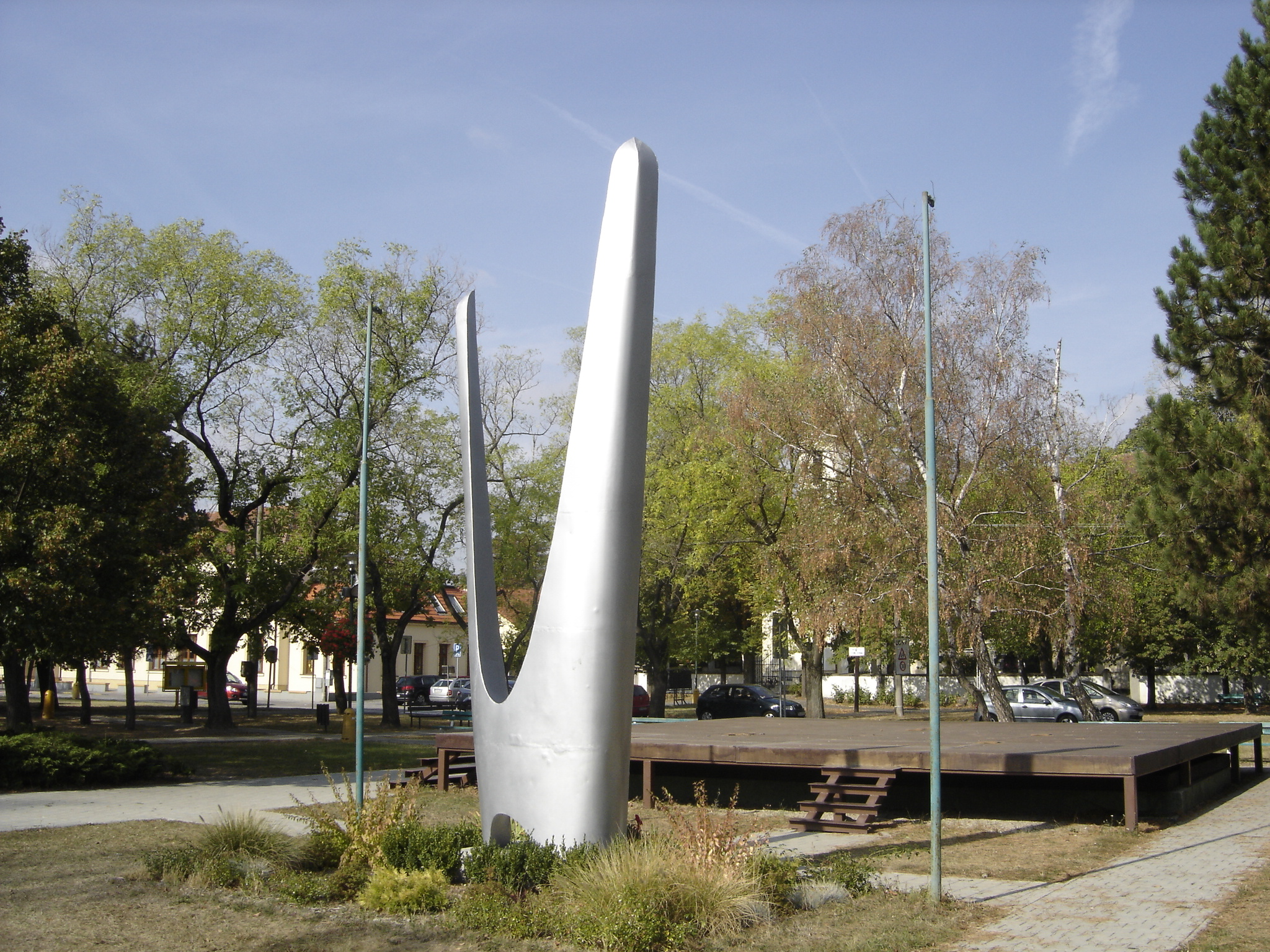
- Monument to the Red Army in Vajnory

- Coat of arms

- Area of Vajnory in Bratislava

- Location of Vajnory in Slovakia
- Coordinates: 48°08′00″N 17°07′00″E
- Country: Slovakia
- Region: Bratislava Region
- District: Bratislava III
- First mentioned: 1237

Government
  - Mayor: Michal Vlček

Area
  - Total: 13.53 km^{2} (5.22 sq mi)
- Elevation: 130 m (430 ft)

Population (2025)
  - Total: 6,011
- Time zone: UTC+1 (CET)
  - Summer (DST): UTC+2 (CEST)
- Postal code: 831 07
- Area code: +421-2
- Vehicle registration plate (until 2022): BA, BL, BT
- Website: www.vajnory.sk

Vajnory is a small borough in the northeast of Bratislava, Slovakia.

Milan Rastislav Štefánik international airport is located near Vajnory. Another airport - Vajnory Airport, which was the first airport in Slovakia - closed in 2006.

== History ==
The first written mention of Vajnory dates to 1237, when it was a village with the original Slovak Slovak name Prača / Pračany. In 1307, Heiligenkreuz Abbey in Austria purchased it and renamed it Weinern, referring to the main occupation of the villagers, working on vineyards and making wine. A relic of this name remains today in the Slovak variant, Vajnory. It was purchased again by Bratislava in the 16th century. It was a borough only until 1851, when, shortly after the abolition of serfdom, Vajnory became an independent village again. It was made an official borough of Bratislava in 1946.

== Geography ==
The municipality lies at an altitude of 130 metres (430 ft) and covers an area of 13.53 km^{2} (5.22 sq mi) (2025).

== Population ==
Population statistic (10 years)
Year	1995	2005	2015	2025
Count	3382	4331	5556	6011
Difference		+28.06%	+28.28%	+8.18%

Population statistic
Year	2024	2025
Count	6041	6011
Difference		−0.49%

It has a population of 6011 people (31 December 2025).

=== Ethnicity ===
Census 2021 (1+ %)
Ethnicity	Number	Fraction
Slovak	5407	88.94%
Not found out	395	6.49%
Vietnamese	120	1.97%
Hungarian	81	1.33%
Czech	80	1.31%
Other	78	1.28%
Total	6079	

In year 2021 was 6079 people by ethnicity 5407 as Slovak, 395 as Not found out, 120 as Vietnamese, 81 as Hungarian, 80 as Czech, 78 as Other, 19 as Ukrainian, 14 as Rusyn, 13 as Russian, 11 as Romanian, 10 as German, 8 as Turkish, 8 as Polish, 7 as Serbian, 7 as Albanian, 6 as Bulgarian, 5 as Croatian, 4 as Romani, 4 as Moravian, 4 as English, 3 as Chinese, 3 as Canadian, 2 as Jewish, 2 as Italian, 1 as Irish, 1 as Silesian, 1 as Greek and 1 as French.

Note on population: The difference values of population numbers in the table "Population statistic" and in the sections "Ethnicity" & "Religion" is caused by the use of various statistical methods.

=== Religion ===
Census 2021 (1+ %)
Religion	Number	Fraction
Roman Catholic Church	2753	45.29%
None	2514	41.36%
Not found out	400	6.58%
Evangelical Church	165	2.71%
Total	6079	

In year 2021 was 6079 people by religion 2753 from Roman Catholic Church, 2514 from None, 400 from Not found out, 165 from Evangelical Church, 53 from Greek Catholic Church, 33 from Islam, 31 from Other, 24 from Eastern Orthodox Church, 20 from Ad hoc movements, 18 from Christian Congregations in Slovakia, 17 from Other and not ascertained christian church, 14 from Apostolic Church, 10 from Calvinist Church, 6 from Buddhism, 4 from Paganism and natural spirituality, 4 from Hinduism, 3 from Jewish community, 3 from Seventh-day Adventist Church, 2 from Jehovah's Witnesses, 2 from United Methodist Church, 2 from Church of the Brethren and 1 from Baptists Church.

== Photogallery ==
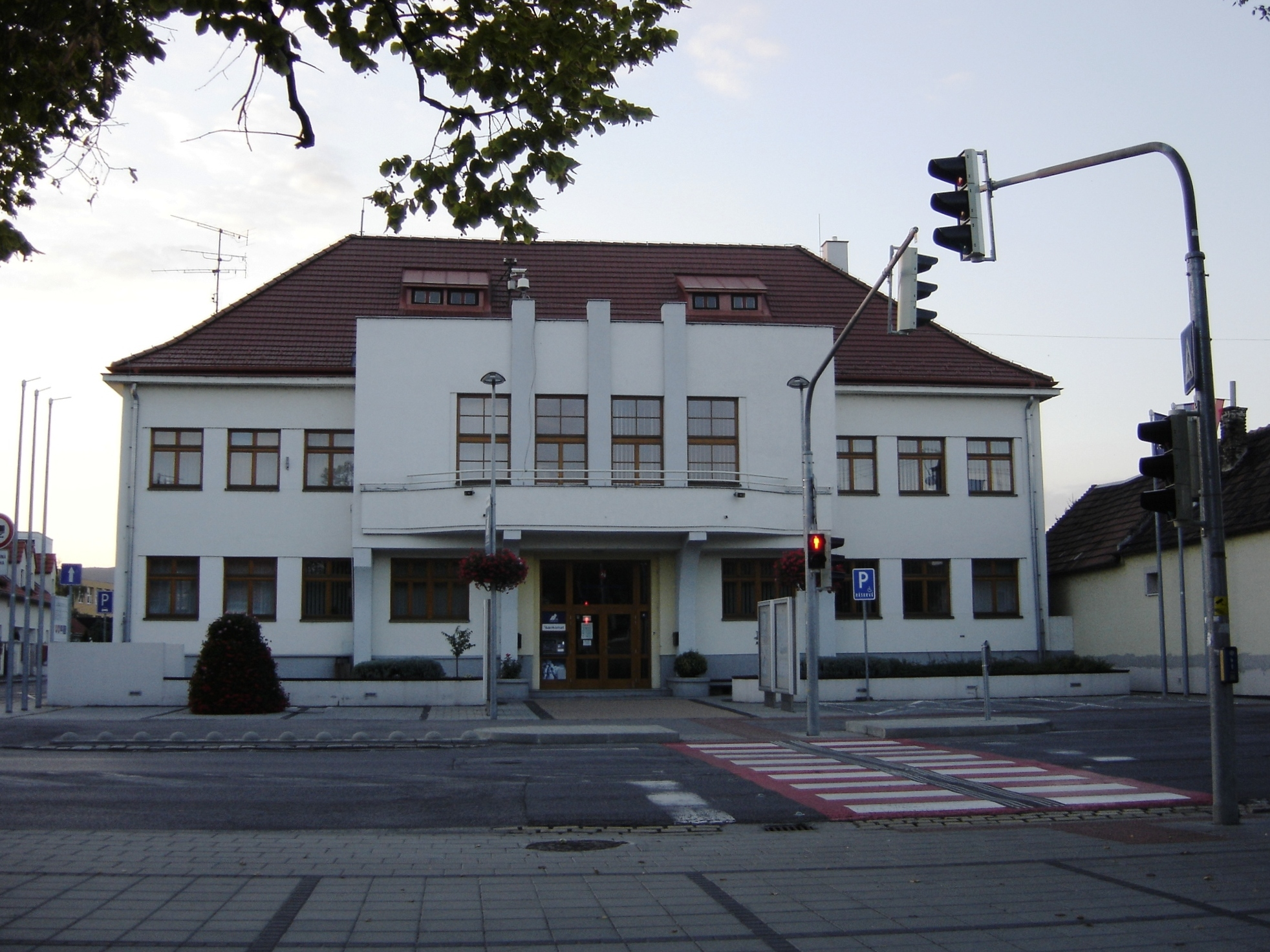
Municipality of Vajnory

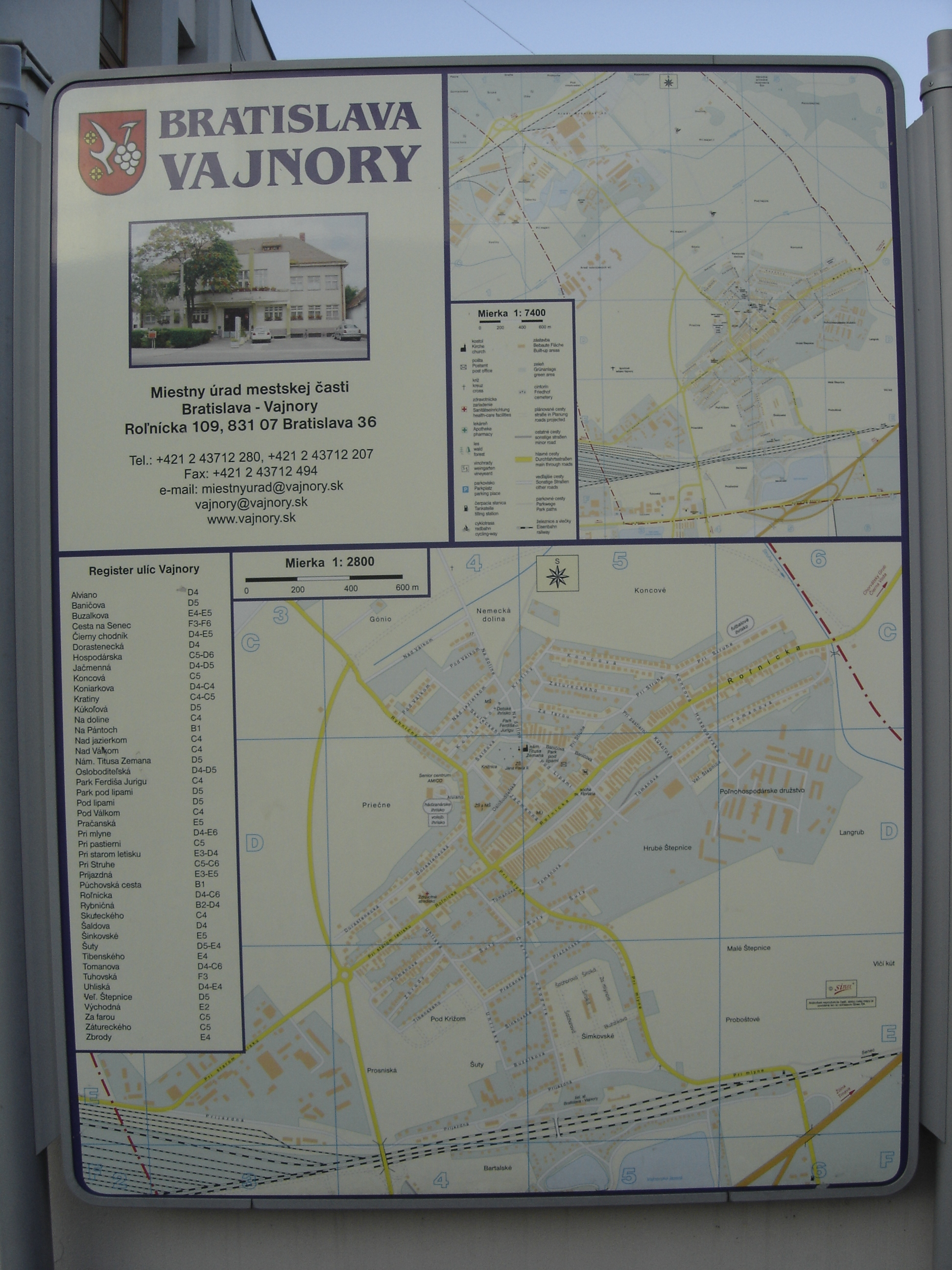
The map of Vajnory

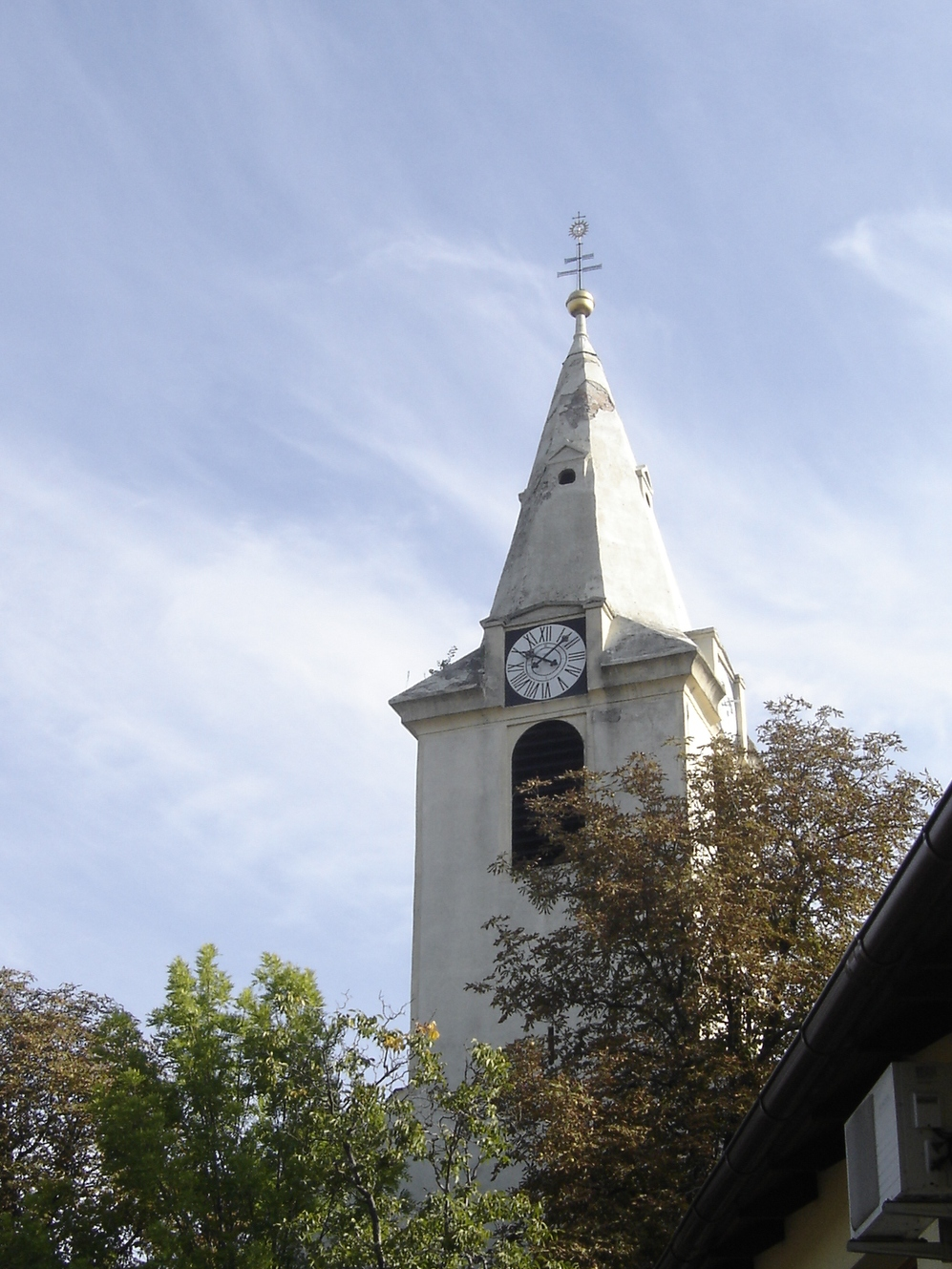
The church tower

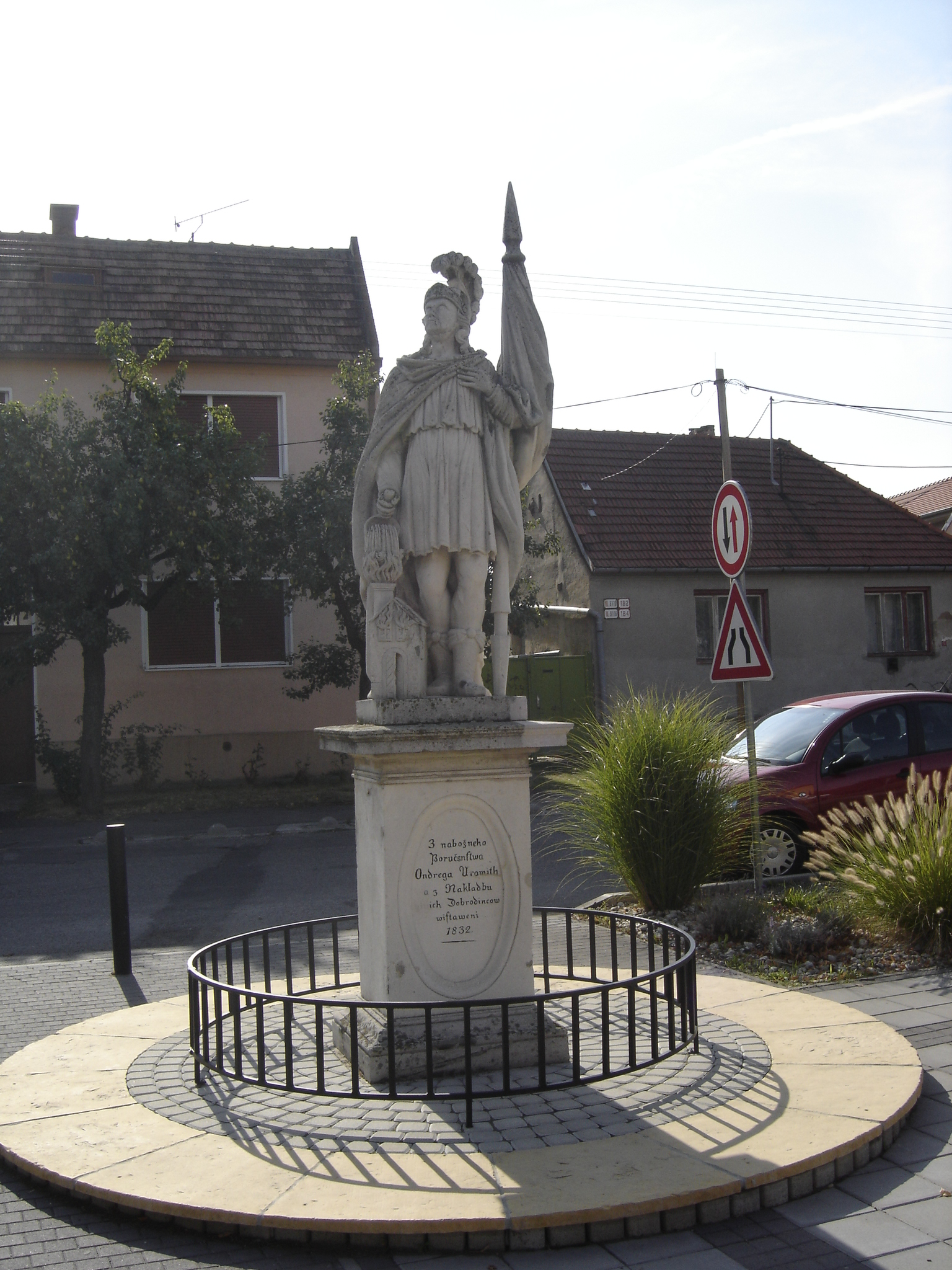
Statue of St. Florián

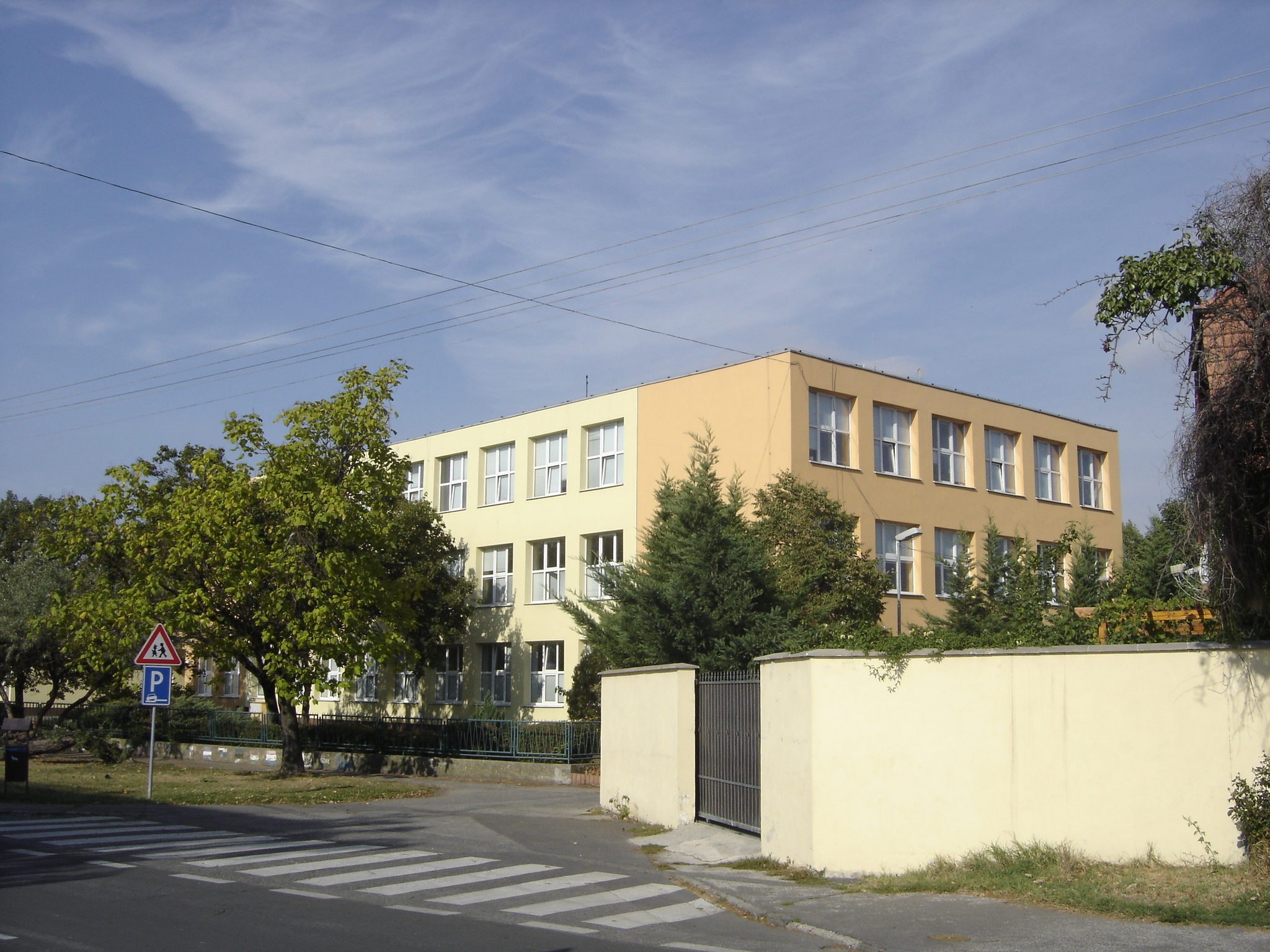
Elementary school of Katarína Brúderová

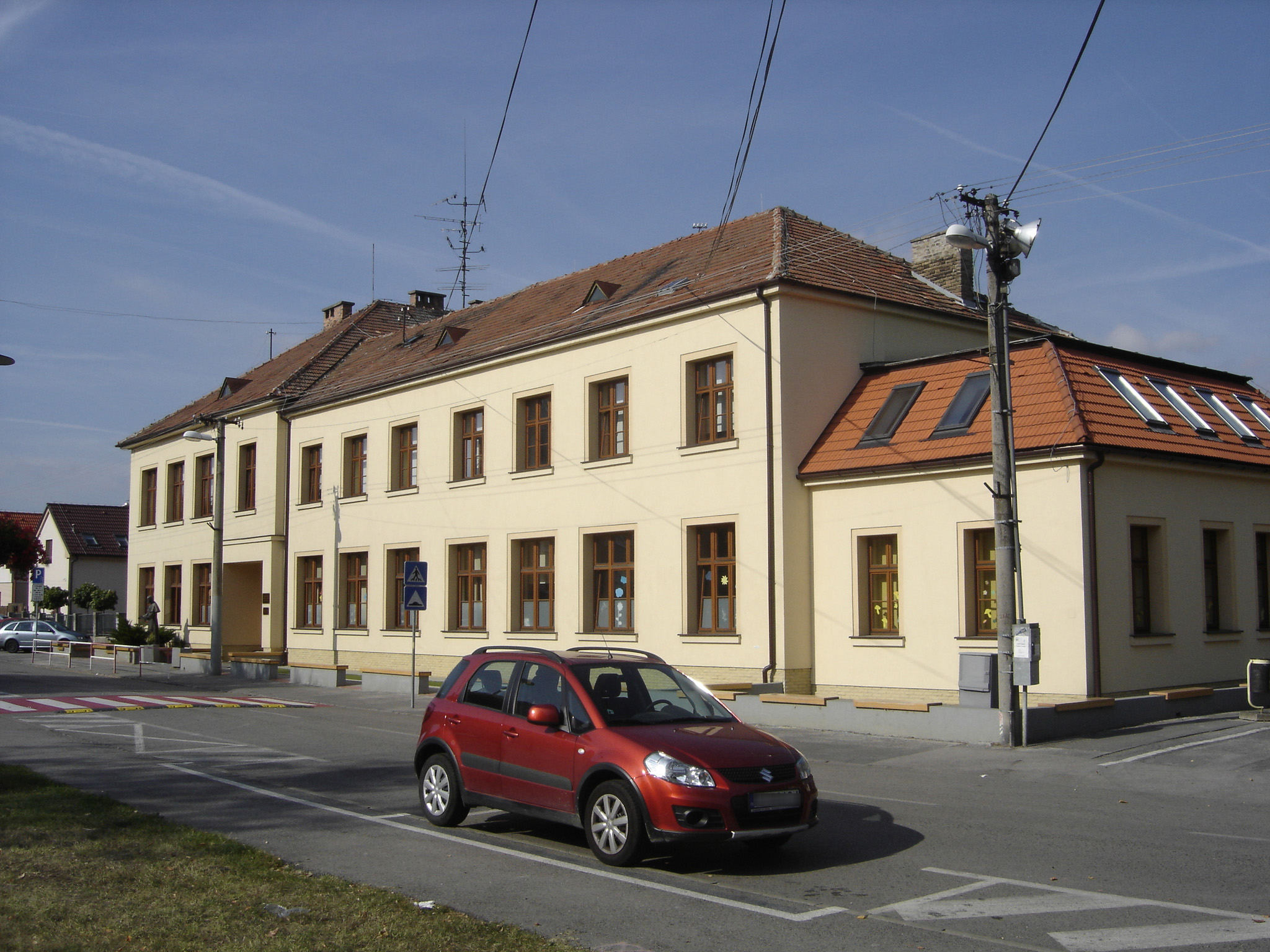
Elementary school of John Paul II

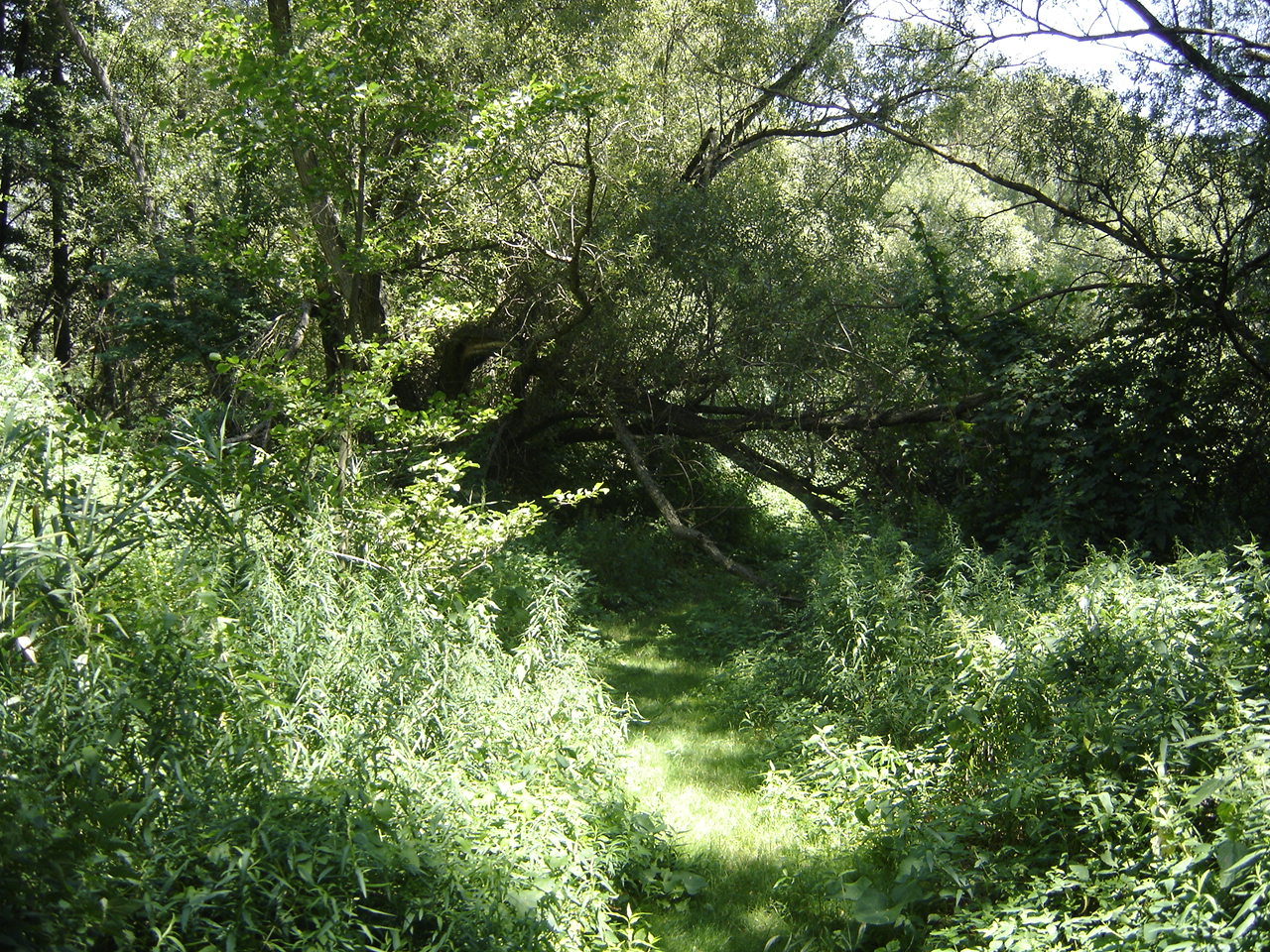
Nature reserve Šúr close to Vajnory

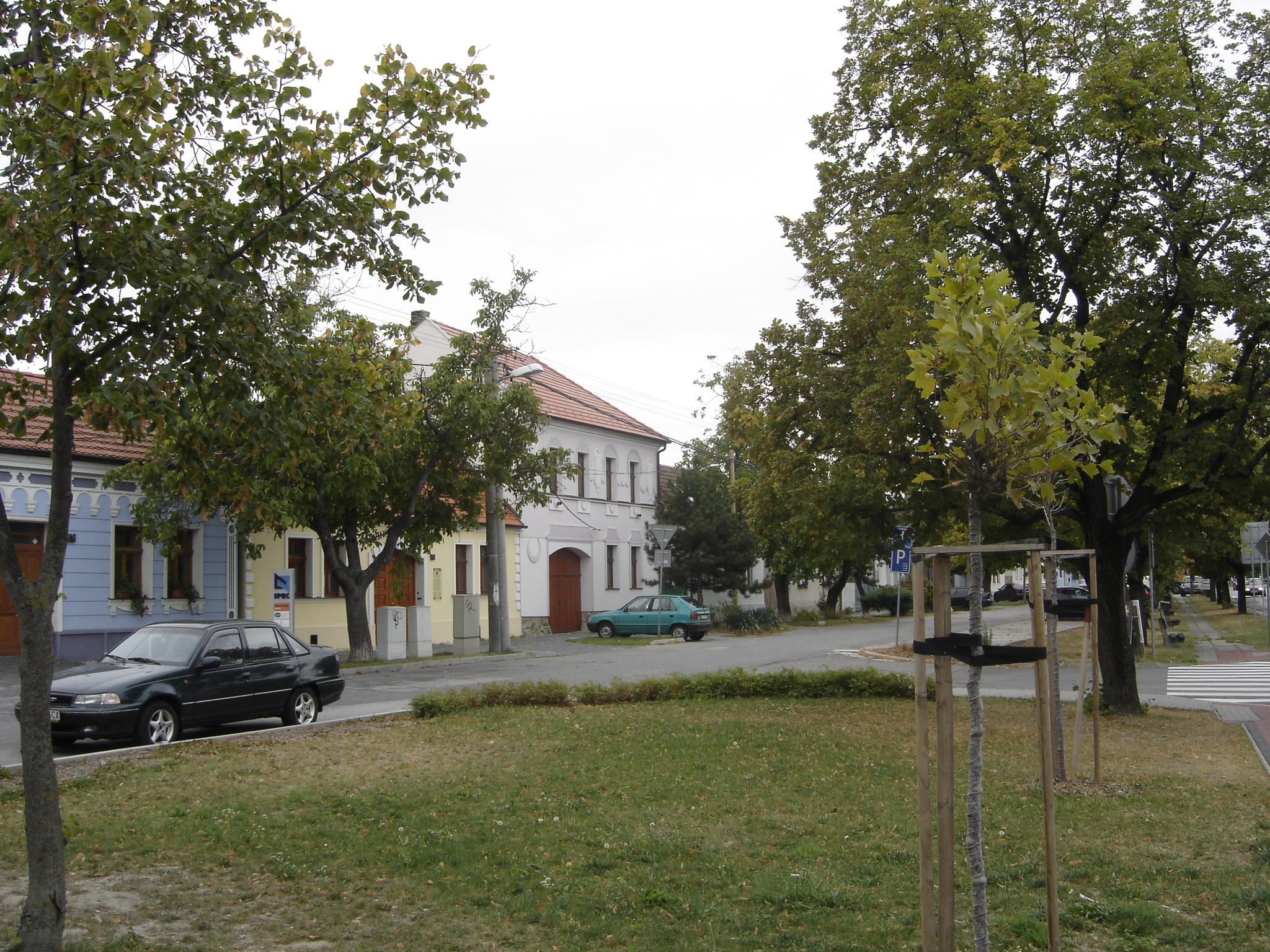
Main street in Vajnory
