= Rowing at the 2014 Asian Games =

Asian Games competition

- Venue: Tangeum Lake
- Dates: 20–25 September 2014
- Competitors: 224 from 19 nations

Rowing at the 2014 Asian Games was held in Chungju Tangeum Lake International Rowing Center, Incheon, South Korea from September 20 to 25, 2014.

== Schedule ==
H	Heats	R	Repechages	F	Finals

Event↓/Date →	20th Sat	21st Sun	22nd Mon	23rd Tue	24th Wed	25th Thu
Men's single sculls		H		R		F
Men's double sculls		H		R		F
Men's quadruple sculls	H		R		F	
Men's eight		H				F
Men's lightweight single sculls	H		R		F	
Men's lightweight double sculls	H		R		F	
Men's lightweight quadruple sculls		H		R		F
Women's single sculls	H				F	
Women's double sculls	H				F	
Women's quadruple sculls		H		R		F
Women's coxless pair	H				F	
Women's lightweight single sculls		H				F
Women's lightweight double sculls		H				F
Women's lightweight quadruple sculls	H		R		F	

== Medalists ==
=== Men ===
Event	Gold	Silver	Bronze
Single sculls	Mohsen Shadi; Iran	Kim Dong-yong; South Korea	Sawarn Singh; India
Double sculls	China; Zhang Liang; Dai Jun	Chinese Taipei; Wang Ming-hui; Yu Tsung-wei	Iran; Mojtaba Shojaei; Amir Rahnama
Quadruple sculls	China; Ma Jian; Liu Zhiyu; Liu Dang; Zhang Quan	South Korea; Kim In-won; Kim Hwi-gwan; Lee Seon-soo; Choi Do-sub	Kazakhstan; Vitaliy Vassilyev; Mikhail Taskin; Yevgeniy Vassilyev; Vladislav Yakovlev
Eight	China; Cheng Xunman; Yang Dongdong; Zhao Longjie; Feng Jiahui; Ni Xulin; Liu Hang; Yang Zengxin; Li Dongjian; Zhang Shetian	Japan; Yu Kataoka; Yusuke Imai; Sumito Nakamura; Baku Hiraki; Mitsuo Nishimura; Kiyotaka Ito; Masato Kobayashi; Kenta Tadachi; Hiroki Sasano	India; Kapil Sharma; Ranjit Singh; Bajrang Lal Takhar; P. U. Robin; Sawan Kumar Kalkal; Azad Mohammed; Maninder Singh; Davinder Singh; Ahmed Mohammed
Lightweight single sculls	Lok Kwan Hoi; Hong Kong	Lee Hak-beom; South Korea	Dushyant Chauhan; India
Lightweight double sculls	Japan; Takahiro Suda; Hideki Omoto	Hong Kong; Chow Kwong Wing; Tang Chiu Mang	China; Dong Tianfeng; Kong Deming
Lightweight quadruple sculls	China; Yu Chenggang; Li Hui; Fan Junjie; Wang Tiexin	Hong Kong; Chow Kwong Wing; Tang Chiu Mang; Leung Chun Shek; Kwan Ki Cheong	Indonesia; Ardi Isadi; Tanzil Hadid; Muhad Yakin; Ihram

=== Women ===
Event	Gold	Silver	Bronze
Single sculls	Kim Ye-ji; South Korea	Lee Ka Man; Hong Kong	Tạ Thanh Huyền; Vietnam
Double sculls	China; Duan Jingli; Lü Yang	Kazakhstan; Mariya Vassilyeva; Svetlana Germanovich	Thailand; Rojjana Raklao; Phuttharaksa Neegree
Quadruple sculls	China; Wang Min; Shen Xiaoxing; Wang Yuwei; Zhang Xinyue	South Korea; Kim Seul-gi; Ma Se-rom; Jeon Seo-yeong; Kim A-rum	Vietnam; Lê Thị An; Phạm Thị Huệ; Phạm Thị Thảo; Phạm Thị Hài
Coxless pair	China; Zhang Min; Miao Tian	South Korea; Jeon Seo-yeong; Kim Seo-hee	Kazakhstan; Yekaterina Artemyeva; Viktoriya Chepikova
Lightweight single sculls	Ji Yoo-jin; South Korea	Lee Ka Man; Hong Kong	Soulmaz Abbasi; Iran
Lightweight double sculls	China; Zhang Huan; Chen Le	Japan; Eri Wakai; Asumi Suehiro	Thailand; Rojjana Raklao; Phuttharaksa Neegree
Lightweight quadruple sculls	China; Guo Shuai; Pan Dandan; Chen Cuiming; Huang Wenyi	Vietnam; Lê Thị An; Phạm Thị Huệ; Phạm Thị Thảo; Phạm Thị Hài	Iran; Homeira Barzegar; Nazanin Malaei; Mahsa Javer; Soulmaz Abbasi

== Medal table ==
Rank	Nation	Gold	Silver	Bronze	Total
1	China (CHN)	9	0	1	10
2	South Korea (KOR)	2	5	0	7
3	Hong Kong (HKG)	1	4	0	5
4	Japan (JPN)	1	2	0	3
5	Iran (IRI)	1	0	3	4
6	Kazakhstan (KAZ)	0	1	2	3
6	Vietnam (VIE)	0	1	2	3
8	Chinese Taipei (TPE)	0	1	0	1
9	India (IND)	0	0	3	3
10	Thailand (THA)	0	0	2	2
11	Indonesia (INA)	0	0	1	1
Totals (11 entries)		14	14	14	42

== Participating nations ==
A total of 224 athletes from 19 nations competed in rowing at the 2014 Asian Games:

- China (35)
- Chinese Taipei (8)
- Hong Kong (10)
- India (28)
- Indonesia (13)
- Iran (23)
- Iraq (4)
- Japan (13)
- Kazakhstan (13)
- Kuwait (3)
- North Korea (8)
- Pakistan (3)
- Philippines (5)
- Qatar (2)
- Singapore (1)
- South Korea (20)
- Thailand (12)
- Uzbekistan (16)
- Vietnam (7)
