= Rowing at the 2018 Asian Games =

Asian Games competition

- Venue: Jakabaring Lake
- Dates: 19–24 August 2018
- Competitors: 259 from 23 nations

Rowing at the 2018 Asian Games was held at the JSC Lake, Jakabaring Sport City, Palembang, Indonesia from 19 August to 24 August 2018.

== Schedule ==
H	Heats	R	Repechages	F	Finals

Event↓/Date →	19th Sun	20th Mon	21st Tue	22nd Wed	23rd Thu	24th Fri
Men's single sculls	H		R		F	
Men's double sculls	H		R		F	
Men's quadruple sculls		H		R		F
Men's coxless pair	H				F	
Men's lightweight single sculls		H		R		F
Men's lightweight double sculls		H		R		F
Men's lightweight coxless four	H		R		F	
Men's lightweight eight		H		R		F
Women's single sculls	H		R		F	
Women's double sculls	H				F	
Women's coxless pair	H		R		F	
Women's coxless four		H		R		F
Women's lightweight single sculls		H				F
Women's lightweight double sculls		H				F
Women's lightweight quadruple sculls	H		R		F	

== Medalists ==
=== Men ===
Event	Gold	Silver	Bronze
Single sculls	Zhang Liang; China	Kim Dong-yong; South Korea	Ryuta Arakawa; Japan
Double sculls	Uzbekistan; Shakhboz Kholmurzaev; Shakhboz Abdujabborov	China; Zhang Zhiyuan; Chen Sensen	Thailand; Prem Nampratueng; Jaruwat Saensuk
Quadruple sculls	India; Sawarn Singh; Dattu Baban Bhokanal; Om Prakash; Sukhmeet Singh	Indonesia; Kakan Kusmana; Edwin Ginanjar Rudiana; Sulpianto; La Memo	Thailand; Piyapong Arnunamang; Methasit Phromphoem; Prem Nampratueng; Jaruwat Saensuk
Coxless pair	China; Li Xiaoxiong; Zhao Jingbin	Uzbekistan; Sardor Tulkinkhujaev; Alisher Turdiev	Japan; Yoshihiro Otsuka; Yuta Takano
Lightweight single sculls	Park Hyun-su; South Korea	Chiu Hin Chun; Hong Kong	Dushyant Chauhan; India
Lightweight double sculls	Japan; Masayuki Miyaura; Masahiro Takeda	South Korea; Kim Byung-hoon; Lee Min-hyuk	India; Rohit Kumar; Bhagwan Singh
Lightweight coxless four	China; Xiong Xiong; Lü Fanpu; Zhao Chao; Zhou Xuewu	Indonesia; Ali Buton; Ferdiansyah; Ihram; Ardi Isadi	Uzbekistan; Islambek Mambetnazarov; Shekhroz Hakimov; Otamurod Rakhimov; Zafar Usmonov
Lightweight eight	Indonesia; Tanzil Hadid; Muhad Yakin; Rio Rizki Darmawan; Jefri Ardianto; Ali Buton; Ferdiansyah; Ihram; Ardi Isadi; Ujang Hasbulloh	Uzbekistan; Islambek Mambetnazarov; Anatoliy Krasnov; Alisher Yarov; Shekhroz Hakimov; Shokhjakhon Najmiev; Zafar Usmonov; Otamurod Rakhimov; Dostonjon Bahriev; Dostonjon Khursanov	Hong Kong; Kenneth Liu; Chau Yee Ping; James Wong; Tang Chiu Mang; Lam San Tung; Yuen Yun Lam; Leung Chun Shek; Wong Wai Kin; Cheung Ming Hang

=== Women ===
Event	Gold	Silver	Bronze
Single sculls	Chen Yunxia; China	Huang Yi-ting; Chinese Taipei	Alexandra Opachanova; Kazakhstan
Double sculls	China; Jiang Yan; Li Jingjing	South Korea; Kim Seul-gi; Kim Ye-ji	Iran; Maryam Karami; Parisa Ahmadi
Coxless pair	China; Ju Rui; Lin Xinyu	South Korea; Jeon Seo-yeong; Kim Seo-hee	Indonesia; Julianti; Yayah Rokayah
Coxless four	China; Yi Liqin; Guo Linlin; Zhang Min; Wang Fei	Vietnam; Đinh Thị Hảo; Trần Thị An; Lê Thị Hiền; Phạm Thị Huệ	Indonesia; Chelsea Corputty; Wa Ode Fitri Rahmanjani; Julianti; Yayah Rokayah
Lightweight single sculls	Pan Dandan; China	Nazanin Malaei; Iran	Lee Ka Man; Hong Kong
Lightweight double sculls	China; Liang Guoru; Wu Qiang	Iran; Nazanin Rahmani; Maryam Omidi Parsa	Thailand; Matinee Raruen; Phuttharaksa Neegree
Lightweight quadruple sculls	Vietnam; Lường Thị Thảo; Hồ Thị Lý; Tạ Thanh Huyền; Phạm Thị Thảo	Iran; Maryam Karami; Mahsa Javer; Nazanin Rahmani; Maryam Omidi Parsa	South Korea; Jung Hye-ri; Ku Bo-yeun; Choi Yu-ri; Ji Yoo-jin

== Medal table ==
Rank	Nation	Gold	Silver	Bronze	Total
1	China (CHN)	9	1	0	10
2	South Korea (KOR)	1	4	1	6
3	Indonesia (INA)	1	2	2	5
4	Uzbekistan (UZB)	1	2	1	4
5	Vietnam (VIE)	1	1	0	2
6	India (IND)	1	0	2	3
6	Japan (JPN)	1	0	2	3
8	Iran (IRI)	0	3	1	4
9	Hong Kong (HKG)	0	1	2	3
10	Chinese Taipei (TPE)	0	1	0	1
11	Thailand (THA)	0	0	3	3
12	Kazakhstan (KAZ)	0	0	1	1
Totals (12 entries)		15	15	15	45

== Participating nations ==
A total of 259 athletes from 23 nations competed in rowing at the 2018 Asian Games:

- Bangladesh (1)
- China (21)
- Chinese Taipei (9)
- Hong Kong (17)
- India (25)
- Indonesia (27)
- Iran (14)
- Iraq (1)
- Japan (14)
- Kazakhstan (13)
- Korea (15)
- Malaysia (2)
- Myanmar (13)
- Pakistan (3)
- Qatar (1)
- Saudi Arabia (1)
- Singapore (1)
- South Korea (18)
- Sri Lanka (4)
- Thailand (16)
- United Arab Emirates (3)
- Uzbekistan (17)
- Vietnam (23)
