= 2017 Asian Rowing Championships =

- Host city: Pattaya, Thailand
- Dates: 4–8 September 2017
- Main venue: Klong Phai Water Sport Training Centre

The 2017 Asian Rowing Championships were the 18th Asian Rowing Championships and took place from 4 to 8 September 2017 in Klong Phai Water Sport Training Centre, Pattaya, Thailand.

== Medal summary ==
=== Men ===
Event	Gold	Silver	Bronze
Single sculls	Vladislav Yakovlev; Kazakhstan	Kim Dong-yong; South Korea	Khashayar Abbasabadi; Iran
Double sculls	South Korea; Kim Hwi-gwan; Kim Jong-jin	Iran; Masoud Mohammadi; Bahman Nassiri	Thailand; Prem Nampratueng; Nuttapong Sangpromcharee
Quadruple sculls	Iran; Siavash Saeidi; Mojtaba Shojaei; Masoud Mohammadi; Bahman Nassiri	Indonesia; Kakan Kusmana; Sulpianto; Edwin Ginanjar Rudiana; La Memo	Thailand; Sitthakarn Paisanwan; Nuttapong Sangpromcharee; Prem Nampratueng; Jaruwat Saensuk
Coxless pair	Uzbekistan; Alisher Turdiev; Sardor Tulkinkhujaev	Hong Kong; Law Hiu Fung; Wong Wai Kin	South Korea; Lee Seon-soo; Jin Doo-hwa
Coxless four	China; Zhang Yihua; Chen Ang; Guo Kang; Zhao Wenke	Uzbekistan; Farrukh Astonov; Otamurod Rakhimov; Dostonjon Bahriev; Uktamjon Davronov	Japan; Takaaki Akagi; Kenta Tadachi; Shinichi Katsumata; Yuta Takano
Eight	Indonesia; Mahendra Yanto; Mochamad Alidarta Lakiki; Muhad Yakin; Ali Buton; Ferdiansyah; Ihram; Tanzil Hadid; Ardi Isadi; Ujang Hasbulloh	Japan; Daisuke Shimizu; Tsuguto Hayashi; Takaaki Akagi; Tomoyoshi Nakamizo; Yoshihiro Otsuka; Kenta Tadachi; Shinichi Katsumata; Yuta Takano; Hiroyuki Tatsuta	China; Chen Long; H. Wei; Zhang Hongxu; Ji Shunyong; Tang Huaizhuang; Zhang Yan; Guo Kang; Chen Ang; Tian Lu
Lightweight single sculls	Park Hyun-su; South Korea	Jaruwat Saensuk; Thailand	Shakhboz Kholmurzaev; Uzbekistan
Lightweight double sculls	Hong Kong; Leung Chun Shek; Tang Chiu Mang	Uzbekistan; Takhir Rakhmatov; Shakhzod Nasridinov	China; Li Jiahao; Xiang Jingang
Lightweight quadruple sculls	China; Zheng Mao; Wang Jie; Zhang Zhiyuan; Ma Yule	Hong Kong; Leung Chun Shek; Kenneth Liu; Tang Chiu Mang; Chiu Hin Chun	Thailand; Phiphat Phiyasaksantikun; Sakon Somwang; Methasit Phromphoem; Somporn Mueangkhot
Lightweight coxless four	China; Zhang Jilin; Fan Mingrui; Dong Jie; Zhu Guiying	Hong Kong; Chan Tik Lun; Chau Yee Ping; James Wong; Yuen Yun Lam	India; Sai Raju Duddu; Nikhil Goliyan; Akshat Tanwar; Lucky

=== Women ===
Event	Gold	Silver	Bronze
Single sculls	Liu Ruiqi; China	Alexandra Opachanova; Kazakhstan	Kim Ye-ji; South Korea
Double sculls	Iran; Mahsa Javer; Parisa Ahmadi	South Korea; Kim Seul-gi; Kim Bo-mi	Thailand; Rojjana Raklao; Phuttharaksa Neegree
Quadruple sculls	Iran; Nazanin Rahmani; Mahsa Javer; Parisa Ahmadi; Maryam Omidi Parsa	Kazakhstan; Alina Mochula; Alexandra Opachanova; Svetlana Germanovich; Mariya Poida	Thailand; Tippaporn Pitukpaothai; Matinee Raruen; Rojjana Raklao; Phuttharaksa Neegree
Coxless pair	China; Sun Hongjing; Lu Shiyu	South Korea; Jeon Seo-yeong; Kim Seo-hee	Indonesia; Julianti; Yayah Rokayah
Coxless four	Indonesia; Wa Ode Fitri Rahmanjani; Yuniarti; Julianti; Yayah Rokayah	China; Chen Jiamin; Ye Yini; Lin Meixuan; Wang Mingzhu	Vietnam; Triệu Thị Huệ; Triệu Thị Nhung; Lê Thị Hiền; Trần Thị An
Lightweight single sculls	Nazanin Malaei; Iran	Lee Ka Man; Hong Kong	Choi Yu-ri; South Korea
Lightweight double sculls	Iran; Nazanin Rahmani; Maryam Omidi Parsa	South Korea; Park In-soo; Jeong Hye-ri	Chinese Taipei; Lee Kuan-yi; Hsieh I-ching
Lightweight quadruple sculls	Vietnam; Đinh Thị Hảo; Tạ Thanh Huyền; Nguyễn Thị Giang; Hồ Thị Lý	China; Zhong Qinglin; Zhang Weixiao; Zhang Weimiao; Xie Suzhen	Indonesia; Wahyuni; Endang Sri Hevina; Chelsea Corputty; Syiva Lisdiana
Lightweight coxless four	China; Wu Qiang; Huang Mengru; Wang Linlin; Cheng Mengyin	Iran; Homeira Barzegar; Fereshteh Roumi; Shakiba Voghoufi; Maryam Omidi Parsa	Thailand; Thilada Pitakpaothai; Krittiya Harirak; Patchareeya Jardsakul; Areerat Uaree

== Medal table ==
Rank	Nation	Gold	Silver	Bronze	Total
1	China	6	2	2	10
2	Iran	5	2	1	8
3	South Korea	2	4	3	9
4	Indonesia	2	1	2	5
5	Hong Kong	1	4	0	5
6	Uzbekistan	1	2	1	4
7	Kazakhstan	1	2	0	3
8	Vietnam	1	0	1	2
9	Thailand	0	1	6	7
10	Japan	0	1	1	2
11	Chinese Taipei	0	0	1	1
11	India	0	0	1	1
Totals (12 entries)		19	19	19	57
