= 2016 Asian Rowing Championships =

- Host city: Jiashan, China
- Dates: 9–13 September 2016
- Main venue: Fenhu Water Sports Center

The 2016 Asian Rowing Championships were the 17th Asian Rowing Championships and took place from 9 to 13 September 2016, in Fenhu Water Sports Center, Jiashan, China.

== Medal summary ==
=== Men ===
Event	Gold	Silver	Bronze
Single sculls	Zang Ha; China	Kim Dong-yong; South Korea	Law Hiu Fung; Hong Kong
Double sculls	South Korea; Kim Hwi-gwan; Kim Jong-jin	Uzbekistan; Shakhboz Kholmurzaev; Shakhboz Abdujabborov	Thailand; Prem Nampratueng; Jaruwat Saensuk
Quadruple sculls	China; Guo Hongliang; Lü Song; Li Ganggang; Sui Bin	Kazakhstan; Vladislav Yakovlev; Alexandr Yurov; Mikhail Taskin; Yevgeniy Vassilyev	Uzbekistan; Shakhboz Abdujabborov; Sabrillo Barotov; Abubakir Uzakbaev; Dilshod Baymuratov
Coxless pair	China; Yang Dongdong; Cheng Xunman	Hong Kong; Law Hiu Fung; Wong Wai Kin	Kazakhstan; Mikhail Taskin; Yevgeniy Vassilyev
Coxless four	China; Li Chong; Li Dongjian; Guo Xiaobin; Wang Linqing	Uzbekistan; Shekhroz Hakimov; Shokhjakhon Najmiev; Islambek Mambetnazarov; Zafar Usmonov	Kazakhstan; Alexandr Maslov; Anton Gaidash; Yegor Rychenko; Vitaliy Vassilyev
Eight	China; Li Yuechuan; Liu Bo; Liu Mingyang; Chen Xuanfeng; Bao Yongzhi; Chen Xuanheng; Feng Dongwei; Liu Yangui; Chen Rui	Japan; Hirohide Sakagami; Yasuharu Hayashi; Takaaki Akagi; Takahisa Sugisaki; Kiyotaka Ito; Yoshihiro Otsuka; Tomoyoshi Nakamizo; Mitsuo Nishimura; Hiroki Sasano	Kazakhstan; Vladislav Yakovlev; Anton Gaidash; Alexandr Maslov; Vitaliy Vassilyev; Yegor Rychenko; Mikhail Taskin; Yevgeniy Vassilyev; Alexandr Yurov; Alexandra Opachanova
Lightweight single sculls	Jaruwat Saensuk; Thailand	Mohammed Riyadh; Iraq	Wong Wai Kin; Hong Kong
Lightweight double sculls	China; Chen Junjie; Chen Sensen	Hong Kong; Chiu Hin Chun; Tang Chiu Mang	South Korea; Kang Tae-yoon; Park Hyun-su
Lightweight coxless four	China; Li Lei; Dong Jie; Zhu Guiying; Li Zhongwei	Uzbekistan; Shekhroz Hakimov; Shokhjakhon Najmiev; Islambek Mambetnazarov; Zafar Usmonov	Hong Kong; Chan Tik Lun; Tang Chiu Mang; Kenneth Liu; Wong Wai Kin

=== Women ===
Event	Gold	Silver	Bronze
Single sculls	Kim Ye-ji; South Korea	Huang Yi-ting; Chinese Taipei	Mahsa Javer; Iran
Double sculls	China; Kuang Minna; Huang Kaifeng	Thailand; Rojjana Raklao; Phuttharaksa Neegree	Iran; Parisa Ahmadi; Nazanin Rahmani
Quadruple sculls	China; Guo Xueying; Xu Xingye; Chen Jing; Lu Shiyu	Iran; Maryam Karami; Farahnaz Eshghi; Parisa Ahmadi; Maryam Omidi Parsa	Vietnam; Cao Thị Hảo; Lê Thị Hiền; Đinh Thị Hảo; Tạ Thanh Huyền
Coxless pair	South Korea; Jeon Seo-yeong; Kim Seo-hee	China; Zhang Shuxian; Pan Jie	Kazakhstan; Svetlana Germanovich; Viktoriya Chepikova
Coxless four	China; Yang Xiuying; Li Dan; Zhou Yuxiu; Song Xiangyu	Chinese Taipei; Chang Wen-lin; Wang Hsun-yu; Chu Chieh-ying; Wen Ching-yang	Iran; Nazanin Malaei; Mahsa Javer; Nazanin Rahmani; Farahnaz Eshghi
Lightweight single sculls	Nazanin Malaei; Iran	Lee Ka Man; Hong Kong	Wang Xue; China
Lightweight double sculls	China; Luo Cai; Yang Min	Japan; Atsumi Fukumoto; Ai Kawamoto	South Korea; Choi Yu-ri; Ku Bo-yeun
Lightweight quadruple sculls	China; Xuan Xulian; Zhang Weixiao; Zhang Weimiao; Yan Xiaohua	Japan; Kanako Ueda; Ayuko Suzuki; Shoko Ueno; Ai Tsuchiya	Vietnam; Cao Thị Hảo; Lê Thị Hiền; Đinh Thị Hảo; Tạ Thanh Huyền

== Medal table ==
Rank	Nation	Gold	Silver	Bronze	Total
1	China	12	1	1	14
2	South Korea	3	1	2	6
3	Iran	1	1	3	5
4	Thailand	1	1	1	3
5	Hong Kong	0	3	3	6
6	Uzbekistan	0	3	1	4
7	Japan	0	3	0	3
8	Chinese Taipei	0	2	0	2
9	Kazakhstan	0	1	4	5
10	Iraq	0	1	0	1
11	Vietnam	0	0	2	2
Totals (11 entries)		17	17	17	51
