= 2019 Asian Rowing Championships =

- Host city: Chungju, South Korea
- Dates: 23–27 October 2019
- Main venue: Tangeum Lake International Rowing Regatta

The 2019 Asian Rowing Championships were the 19th Asian Rowing Championships and took place from 23 to 27 October 2019, in Tangeum Lake International Rowing Regatta, Chungju, South Korea.

== Medal summary ==
=== Men ===
Event	Gold	Silver	Bronze
Single sculls	Bahman Nassiri; Iran	Shakhboz Kholmurzaev; Uzbekistan	Park Hyun-su; South Korea
Double sculls	China; Chen Weichun; Zhu Bohao	South Korea; Kim Dong-yong; Myeong Su-seong	India; Sukhmeet Singh; Sawarn Singh
Quadruple sculls	Uzbekistan; Davrjon Davronov; Abdullo Mukhammadiev; Mekhrojbek Mamatkulov; Shakhboz Kholmurzaev	India; Sawarn Singh; Rohit Kumar; Jakar Khan; Sukhmeet Singh	Iran; Siavash Saeidi; Milad Allahverdian; Amir Hossein Mahmoudpour; Bahman Nassiri
Coxless pair	Indonesia; Ferdiansyah; Denri Maulidzar Al-Ghiffari	Uzbekistan; Sardor Tulkinkhujaev; Alisher Turdiev	Hong Kong; Lam San Tung; Wong Wai Chun
Eight	Uzbekistan; Dostonjon Bahriev; Shokhjakhon Najmiev; Sardor Tulkinkhujaev; Alisher Turdiev; Anatoliy Krasnov; Otamurod Rakhimov; Zafar Usmonov; Uktamjon Davronov; Dostonjon Khursanov	Japan; Ryo Kajitani; Masayuki Miyaura; Tatsuya Sakurama; Kazuki Nishi; Yoshihiro Otsuka; Naoki Furuta; Yasuharu Hayashi; Yuta Takano; Hiroki Sasano	India; Akshat Tanwar; Khushpreet Singh Brar; Bhupender; Iqbal Singh; Malkeet Singh; Gurinder Singh; Puneet Kumar; Gurmeet Singh; Pandey
Lightweight single sculls	Chen Weichun; China	Sobirjon Safaroliev; Uzbekistan	Aghel Habibian; Iran
Lightweight double sculls	Hong Kong; Chan Chi Fung; Chiu Hin Chun	India; Arjun Lal Jat; Arvind Singh	Indonesia; Ihram; Mahendra Yanto
Lightweight quadruple sculls	Uzbekistan; Shekhroz Hakimov; Sobirjon Safaroliev; Evgeniy Agafonov; Shakhzod Nurmatov	Hong Kong; Wong Wai Chun; Lam San Tung; Chan Chi Fung; Chiu Hin Chun	Japan; Kakeru Sato; Takuma Nakamura; Daiki Nomura; Kazuki Nara
Lightweight coxless four	India; Jasveer Singh; Jegan Sekar; Tejash Hanamant Shinde; Charanjeet Singh	Hong Kong; Wong Wai Lok; Chau Yee Ping; Wong Ho Yin; Ho Chak Lung	Japan; Jun Kuwamura; Taiga Matsuura; Ryo Shinobu; Asahi Sugiura

=== Women ===
Event	Gold	Silver	Bronze
Single sculls	Zhang Shuxian; China	Huang Yi-ting; Chinese Taipei	Nguyễn Thị Hải; Vietnam
Double sculls	China; Hou Qinyue; Zhang Hairong	South Korea; Song Ji-sun; Lee Su-bin	Iran; Hanieh Khorsand; Nazanin Rahmani
Quadruple sculls	China; Hou Qinyue; Sun Fengjiao; Zhang Hairong; Zhou Ziwen	Thailand; Phuttharaksa Neegree; Matinee Raruen; Parisa Chaempudsa; Rojjana Raklao	Vietnam; Trần Thị An; Nguyễn Thị Hải; Lê Thị Hiền; Phạm Thị Thảo
Coxless pair	China; Zhao Mingwei; Xia Keke	Japan; Akiho Takano; Rena Suzuki	Vietnam; Lê Thị Hiền; Phạm Thị Thảo
Coxless four	China; Zhou Ziwen; Sun Fengjiao; Zhao Mingwei; Xia Keke	Vietnam; Trần Thị An; Nguyễn Thị Hải; Lê Thị Hiền; Phạm Thị Thảo	Thailand; Nuntida Krajangjam; Piyamon Toemsuk; Nattariwan Nunchai; Premruethai Hongseethong
Lightweight single sculls	Nazanin Malaei; Iran	Ji Yoo-jin; South Korea	Ayami Oishi; Japan
Lightweight double sculls	China; Fu Xiaoyue; Zou Jiawang	South Korea; Choi Yu-ri; Jung Hye-ri	Iran; Zeinab Norouzi; Kimia Zareei
Lightweight quadruple sculls	Japan; Kanako Ueda; Hinako Takimoto; Sahoko Kinoda; Ai Tsuchiya	Vietnam; Lường Thị Thảo; Tạ Thanh Huyền; Đinh Thị Hảo; Hồ Thị Lý	Iran; Shakiba Voghoufi; Zeinab Norouzi; Kimia Zareei; Maryam Omidi Parsa

== Medal table ==
Rank	Nation	Gold	Silver	Bronze	Total
1	China	8	0	0	8
2	Uzbekistan	3	3	0	6
3	Iran	2	0	5	7
4	Japan	1	2	3	6
5	India	1	2	2	5
6	Hong Kong	1	2	1	4
7	Indonesia	1	0	1	2
8	South Korea	0	4	1	5
9	Vietnam	0	2	3	5
10	Thailand	0	1	1	2
11	Chinese Taipei	0	1	0	1
Totals (11 entries)		17	17	17	51
