= Rowing at the 2010 Asian Games – Women's lightweight quadruple sculls =

Women's lightweight quadruple sculls at the 2010 Asian Games
- Venue: Guangzhou International Rowing Centre
- Date: 15–19 November 2010
- Competitors: 24 from 6 nations

Medalists
gold medal	China; Yan Shimin, Wang Xinnan, Liu Jing, Liu Tingting
silver medal	Vietnam; Trần Thị Sâm, Nguyễn Thị Hựu, Phạm Thị Hài, Đặng Thị Thắm
bronze medal	Iran; Nasim Benyaghoub, Maryam Saeidi, Soulmaz Abbasi, Homeira Barzegar

The women's lightweight quadruple sculls competition at the 2010 Asian Games in Guangzhou, China was held from 15 November to 19 November at the International Rowing Centre.

== Schedule ==
All times are China Standard Time (UTC+08:00)

Date	Time	Event
Monday, 15 November 2010	11:20	Heat
Friday, 19 November 2010	11:30	Final

== Results ==
=== Heat ===
- Qualification: 1–6 → Final (FA)

Rank	Team	Time	Notes
1	China (CHN); Yan Shimin; Wang Xinnan; Liu Jing; Liu Tingting	6:40.41	FA
2	Vietnam (VIE); Trần Thị Sâm; Nguyễn Thị Hựu; Phạm Thị Hài; Đặng Thị Thắm	6:49.15	FA
3	Iran (IRI); Nasim Benyaghoub; Maryam Saeidi; Soulmaz Abbasi; Homeira Barzegar	6:54.63	FA
4	Hong Kong (HKG); Chan Tsz Wai; Cheung Lai Yin; Tong Siu Man; Lee Yuen Yin	6:59.53	FA
5	India (IND); Priya Devi Changamayum; Thara Kurian; Amusana Devi Moirangthem; Dittymol Varghese	7:06.29	FA
6	Thailand (THA); Tippaporn Pitukpaothai; Parinyaphorn Rerkdee; Bussayamas Phaengkathok; Anita Whiskin	7:18.41	FA

=== Final ===
Rank	Team	Time
1st place, gold medalist(s)	China (CHN); Yan Shimin; Wang Xinnan; Liu Jing; Liu Tingting	6:35.64
2nd place, silver medalist(s)	Vietnam (VIE); Trần Thị Sâm; Nguyễn Thị Hựu; Phạm Thị Hài; Đặng Thị Thắm	6:48.43
3rd place, bronze medalist(s)	Iran (IRI); Nasim Benyaghoub; Maryam Saeidi; Soulmaz Abbasi; Homeira Barzegar	6:52.45
4	India (IND); Priya Devi Changamayum; Thara Kurian; Amusana Devi Moirangthem; Dittymol Varghese	6:57.73
5	Hong Kong (HKG); Chan Tsz Wai; Cheung Lai Yin; Tong Siu Man; Lee Yuen Yin	7:02.02
6	Thailand (THA); Tippaporn Pitukpaothai; Parinyaphorn Rerkdee; Bussayamas Phaengkathok; Anita Whiskin	7:13.00
