= 2015 Asian Rowing Championships =

- Host city: Beijing, China
- Dates: 24–28 September 2015
- Main venue: Shunyi Olympic Rowing-Canoeing Park

The 2015 Asian Rowing Championships were the 16th Asian Rowing Championships and took place from 24 to 28 September 2015, in Shunyi Olympic Rowing-Canoeing Park, Beijing, China.

== Medal summary ==
=== Men ===
Event	Gold	Silver	Bronze
Single sculls	Zang Ha; China	Dattu Baban Bhokanal; India	Law Hiu Fung; Hong Kong
Double sculls	China; Ni Xulin; Li Laifu	India; Roopendra Singh; Sonu Laxmi Narain	Chinese Taipei; Wang Ming-hui; Tsai Wen-hui
Quadruple sculls	China; Ma Jian; Liu Zhiyu; Liu Dang; Zhang Quan	Kazakhstan; Vladislav Yakovlev; Alexandr Yurov; Mikhail Taskin; Vitaliy Vassilyev	Indonesia; Ardi Isadi; La Memo; Muhad Yakin; Ihram
Coxless pair	China; Cheng Xunman; Shen Jiankun	Hong Kong; Leung Chun Shek; Huang Zhongming	India; Davinder Singh; Naveen Kumar Borraiya
Coxless four	China; Yang Zengxin; Li Dongjian; Li Chong; Wang Linqing	India; Kapil Sharma; Jaswinder Singh; Rajesh Verma; Azad Mohammed	Uzbekistan; Zafar Usmonov; Abdurasul Muhammadiev; Shekhroz Hakimov; Islambek Mambetnazarov
Eight	China; Sun Jixue; Ma Junfeng; Zhang Di; Wang Xiaolin; Zhang Yongqiang; Zhao Wenke; Zhao Longjie; Chen Ang; Yu Boxiao	India; Davinder Singh; Naveen Kumar Borraiya; Suchcha Singh Tomer; Gurinder Singh; Kapil Sharma; Jaswinder Singh; Rajesh Verma; Azad Mohammed; Lakshman Rohith Maradapa	Japan; Michitaka Yoshida; Yu Sasaki; Daisuke Tagashira; Tomoyuki Okamura; Shunichi Hirai; Ryuta Arakawa; Ryusei Kajihara; Kosuke Nagano; Sho Shibayama
Lightweight single sculls	Aghel Habibian; Iran	Chen Sensen; China	Dushyant Chauhan; India
Lightweight double sculls	China; Tian Bin; Dong Tianfeng	India; Vikram Singh; Shokendar Tomar	Indonesia; Ardi Isadi; Ihram
Lightweight coxless four	China; Jin Wei; Zeng Tao; Yu Chenggang; Zhao Jingbin	Hong Kong; Tang Chiu Mang; Kwan Ki Cheong; Leung Chun Shek; Huang Zhongming	Uzbekistan; Zafar Usmonov; Abdurasul Muhammadiev; Shekhroz Hakimov; Islambek Mambetnazarov

=== Women ===
Event	Gold	Silver	Bronze
Single sculls	Duan Jingli; China	Dewi Yuliawati; Indonesia	Mahsa Javer; Iran
Double sculls	China; Zhu Weiwei; Wang Yuwei	Hong Kong; Lee Yuen Yin; Lee Ka Man	Iran; Nazanin Rahmani; Nazanin Malaei
Quadruple sculls	China; Jiang Yan; Shen Xiaoxing; Lü Yang; Zhang Xinyue	Kazakhstan; Mariya Poida; Yekaterina Artemyeva; Svetlana Germanovich; Viktoriya Chepikova	Indonesia; Dewi Yuliawati; Julianti; Yayah Rokayah; Wa Ode Fitri Rahmanjani
Coxless pair	China; Zhang Min; Miao Tian	Kazakhstan; Svetlana Germanovich; Viktoriya Chepikova	None awarded
Lightweight single sculls	Wang Miao; China	Nazanin Malaei; Iran	Ji Yoo-jin; South Korea
Lightweight double sculls	China; Chen Cuiming; Pan Feihong	Kazakhstan; Alexandra Opachanova; Yulya Oracheva	Hong Kong; Lee Yuen Yin; Lee Ka Man
Lightweight quadruple sculls	China; Xuan Xulian; Xu Shibei; Zhang Weimiao; Yan Xiaohua	Vietnam; Cao Thị Hảo; Lê Thị An; Tạ Thanh Huyền; Phạm Thị Thảo	Thailand; Tippaporn Pitukpaothai; Matinee Raruen; Rojjana Raklao; Phuttharaksa Neegree

== Medal table ==
Rank	Nation	Gold	Silver	Bronze	Total
1	China	15	1	0	16
2	Iran	1	1	2	4
3	India	0	5	2	7
4	Kazakhstan	0	4	0	4
5	Hong Kong	0	3	2	5
6	Indonesia	0	1	3	4
7	Vietnam	0	1	0	1
8	Uzbekistan	0	0	2	2
9	Chinese Taipei	0	0	1	1
9	Japan	0	0	1	1
9	South Korea	0	0	1	1
9	Thailand	0	0	1	1
Totals (12 entries)		16	16	15	47
