= 2022 Asian Rowing Championships =

- Host city: Ban Chang, Thailand
- Dates: 30 November – 4 December 2022
- Main venue: Royal Thai Navy Rowing Center

The 2022 Asian Rowing Championships were the 21st Asian Rowing Championships and took place from 30 November to 4 December 2022, in Royal Thai Navy Rowing Center, Ban Chang, Rayong Province, Thailand.

== Medal summary ==
=== Men ===
Event	Gold	Silver	Bronze
Single sculls	Chan Chi Fung; Hong Kong	Prem Nampratueng; Thailand	Amir Hossein Mahmoudpour; Iran
Double sculls	Indonesia; Ihram; La Memo	India; Sukhmeet Singh; Jakar Khan	Iran; Hamid Reza Rezvani; Shirzad Ghaderi
Quadruple sculls	China; Zong Zhaoshan; Lu Zhiwen; Li Yinjie; Liu Yingzhuo	Uzbekistan; Davrjon Davronov; Abdullo Mukhammadiev; Mekhrojbek Mamatkulov; Shakhboz Kholmurzaev	Indonesia; Kakan Kusmana; Asuhan Pattiha; Sulpianto; Rendi Setia Maulana
Coxless pair	Hong Kong; Lam San Tung; Wong Wai Chun	Uzbekistan; Shekhroz Hakimov; Dilshodjon Khudoyberdiev	Indonesia; Ferdiansyah; Ali Buton
Coxless four	China; Li Jiahao; Wang Linqing; Ni Xulin; Nie Yide	Uzbekistan; Shukhrat Shodiev; Fazliddin Karimov; Sardor Tulkinkhujaev; Alisher Turdiev	India; Jaswinder Singh; Bheem Singh; Punit Kumar; Ashish
Lightweight single sculls	Chiu Hin Chun; Hong Kong	Mohammed Riyadh; Iraq	Amir Hossein Mahmoudpour; Iran
Lightweight double sculls	India; Arjun Lal Jat; Arvind Singh	Uzbekistan; Shakhzod Nurmatov; Sobirjon Safaroliev	Iraq; Ezzuddin Abdul-Salam; Mohammed Riyadh
Lightweight coxless four	China; Li Jiahao; Jiang Xuke; Zhou Xuewu; Fan Junjie	India; Jasveer Singh; Iqbal Singh; Akshat Tanwar; Charanjeet Singh	Uzbekistan; Samir Rozikov; Alisher Yarov; Shakhzod Nurmatov; Sobirjon Safaroliev

=== Women ===
Event	Gold	Silver	Bronze
Single sculls	Nazanin Malaei; Iran	Yu Wen; China	Svetlana Germanovich; Kazakhstan
Double sculls	Iran; Mahsa Javer; Nazanin Malaei	China; Guo Xueying; Song Qin	Vietnam; Phạm Thị Thảo; Nguyễn Thị Giang
Quadruple sculls	Vietnam; Trần Thị Kiệt; Hồ Thị Lý; Nguyễn Thị Giang; Phạm Thị Huệ	China; Yan Shengnan; Lü Mingfei; Gan Lin; Yin Shuo	Indonesia; Aisah Nabila; Nurtang; Julianti; Melani Putri
Coxless pair	Vietnam; Đinh Thị Hảo; Phạm Thị Huệ	China; Wang Tingting; Zhang Xuan	South Korea; Kim Min-young; Jeon Seo-yeong
Coxless four	Vietnam; Phạm Thị Ngọc Anh; Lê Thị Hiền; Hà Thị Vui; Dư Thị Bông	China; Wei Wenlin; Sun Ning; Li Duolei; Wang Xiao	Hong Kong; Wong Lok Yiu; Cheung Hoi Lam; Hui Wing Ki; Leung King Wan
Lightweight single sculls	Nazanin Malaei; Iran	Leung Wing Wun; Hong Kong	Nuntida Krajangjam; Thailand
Lightweight double sculls	China; Yan Haimin; Huang Mengyi	Hong Kong; Wong Sheung Yee; Winne Hung	Vietnam; Lường Thị Thảo; Đinh Thị Hảo
Lightweight quadruple sculls	Vietnam; Phạm Thị Thảo; Hồ Thị Lý; Lường Thị Thảo; Đinh Thị Hảo	Thailand; Matinee Raruen; Rawiwan Sukkaew; Parisa Chaempudsa; Nuntida Krajangjam	Iran; Shakiba Voghoufi; Kimia Zareei; Zeinab Norouzi; Maryam Omidi Parsa

== Medal table ==
Rank	Nation	Gold	Silver	Bronze	Total
1	China	4	5	0	9
2	Vietnam	4	0	2	6
3	Hong Kong	3	2	1	6
4	Iran	3	0	4	7
5	India	1	2	1	4
6	Indonesia	1	0	3	4
7	Uzbekistan	0	4	1	5
8	Thailand	0	2	1	3
9	Iraq	0	1	1	2
10	Kazakhstan	0	0	1	1
10	South Korea	0	0	1	1
Totals (11 entries)		16	16	16	48
