= 2021 Asian Rowing Championships =

- Host city: Ban Chang, Thailand
- Dates: 9–12 December 2021
- Main venue: Royal Thai Navy Rowing Center

The 2021 Asian Rowing Championships were the 20th Asian Rowing Championships and took place from 9 to 12 December 2021, in Royal Thai Navy Rowing Center, Ban Chang, Rayong Province, Thailand.

== Medal summary ==
=== Men ===
Event	Gold	Silver	Bronze
Single sculls	Shakhboz Kholmurzaev; Uzbekistan	Parminder Singh; India	La Memo; Indonesia
Double sculls	India; Arjun Lal Jat; Ravi	China; Li Qing; Zhang Lutong	Uzbekistan; Davrjon Davronov; Abdullo Mukhammadiev
Quadruple sculls	Uzbekistan; Davrjon Davronov; Abdullo Mukhammadiev; Mekhrojbek Mamatkulov; Shakhboz Kholmurzaev	India; Bittu Singh; Jakar Khan; Manjeet Kumar; Sukhmeet Singh	Vietnam; Nhữ Đình Nam; Nguyễn Văn Hà; Nguyễn Văn Hiếu; Bùi Văn Hoàn
Coxless four	Uzbekistan; Sardor Tulkinkhujaev; Evgeniy Agafonov; Shakhzod Nurmatov; Alisher Turdiev	India; Jasveer Singh; Gurmeet Singh; Punit Kumar; Charanjeet Singh	Indonesia; Ali Buton; Toni Sutisna; Denri Maulidzar Al-Ghiffari; Ferdiansyah
Lightweight single sculls	Arvind Singh; India	Sobirjon Safaroliev; Uzbekistan	Chen Weichun; China
Lightweight double sculls	China; Li Qing; Chen Weichun	India; Ashish Phugat; Sukhjinder Singh	Thailand; Siwakorn Wongpin; Nawamin Deenoi
Lightweight quadruple sculls	Vietnam; Nguyễn Văn Tuấn; Nhữ Đình Nam; Nguyễn Văn Hà; Bùi Văn Hoàn	Indonesia; Mahendra Yanto; Kakan Kusmana; Ihram; Ardi Isadi	Uzbekistan; Shekhroz Hakimov; Dilshodjon Khudoyberdiev; Shakhzod Nurmatov; Sobirjon Safaroliev

=== Women ===
Event	Gold	Silver	Bronze
Single sculls	Zhang Shuxian; China	Lường Thị Thảo; Vietnam	Nurtang; Indonesia
Double sculls	Vietnam; Phạm Thị Huệ; Đinh Thị Hảo	Thailand; Matinee Raruen; Nuntida Krajangjam	Indonesia; Syiva Lisdiana; Aisah Nabila
Quadruple sculls	China; Zhang Qiuyi; Yang Rongrong; Zhang Shuxian; Wu Yongmei	Vietnam; Hồ Thị Lý; Nguyễn Thị Giang; Phạm Thị Thảo; Phạm Thị Huệ	Indonesia; Chelsea Corputty; Melani Putri; Julianti; Mutiara Rahma Putri
Coxless four	Thailand; Nuntida Krajangjam; Matinee Raruen; Jirakit Phuetthonglang; Rawiwan Sukkaew	Singapore; Shervis Teng; Kang Yu Jia; Jacqueline Poh; Sherdyn Teng	Vietnam; Hồ Thị Lý; Phạm Thị Thảo; Phạm Thị Huệ; Đinh Thị Hảo
Lightweight single sculls	Li Huiru; China	Luizakhon Islomova; Uzbekistan	Hsu An-i; Chinese Taipei
Lightweight double sculls	China; Li Huiru; Qiu Xiuping	Vietnam; Lường Thị Thảo; Đinh Thị Hảo	Thailand; Rawiwan Sukkaew; Jirakit Phuetthonglang

== Medal table ==
Rank	Nation	Gold	Silver	Bronze	Total
1	China	5	1	1	7
2	Uzbekistan	3	2	2	7
3	India	2	4	0	6
4	Vietnam	2	3	2	7
5	Thailand	1	1	2	4
6	Indonesia	0	1	5	6
7	Singapore	0	1	0	1
8	Chinese Taipei	0	0	1	1
Totals (8 entries)		13	13	13	39
