= Arjun Lal Jat =

Indian rower (born 1997)

Subedar Arjun Lal Jat
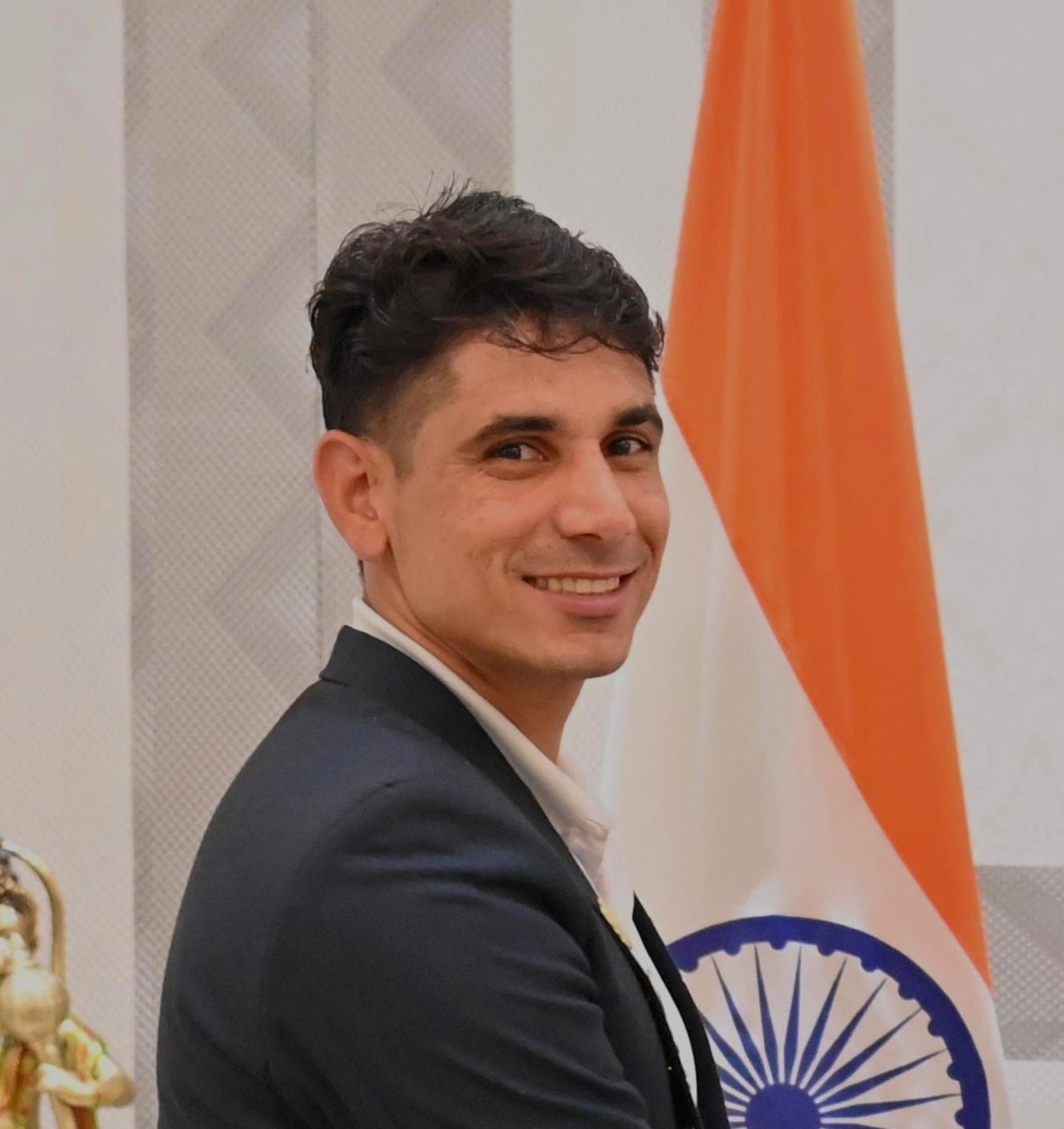
- Arjun Lal in 2024

Personal information
- Born: 7 February 1997 (age 29) Nayabas, Rajasthan, India
- Height: 180 cm (5 ft 11 in)
- Military career
- Allegiance: India
- Branch: Indian Army
- Service years: 2016–present
- Rank: Subedar

Sport
- Sport: Rowing
Medal record
Representing India
Men's Double Sculls Rowing
Event	1st	2nd	3rd
Asian Games	0	1	0
Asian Rowing Championships	2	1	0
Total	2	2	0
Asian Games
Silver medal – second place	2022 Hangzhou	LM2X
Asian Rowing Championships
Gold medal – first place	2022 Thailand	LM2X
Gold medal – first place	2021 Thailand	M2X
Silver medal – second place	2019 Korea	LM2X

Arjun Lal Jat (born 7 February 1997) is an Indian professional rower and a subedar in the Indian Army. He had represented India at international competitions including the Asian Games, Asian Rowing Championships, and the Summer Olympics. He won gold at the 2021 and 2022 Asian Rowing Championships. He won silver at the 2019 Asian Rowing Championships and 2022 Asian Games. He also won gold at the 2022 and 2023 National Games of India.

== Early life ==
Arjun Lal was born on 7 February 1997 in Nayabas village of Jaipur district, Rajasthan. His father, Ramswaroop Jat, is a farmer. He did his primary education at the Government Primary School in Nayabas. He pursued his college education at R.L. Saharia College in Kaladera.

== Career ==
=== Army career ===
Arjun was selected as a sepoy in the Rajputana Rifles regiment in 2014. During his service in the Indian Army, he met his rowing coach Bajrang Lal Takhar, who introduced him to the sport. Following his coach's advice, Arjun began training in rowing from 2014 onwards. In 2020, he was promoted to the rank of Naib Subedar, and after returning from the 2020 Tokyo Olympics, he was further promoted to Subedar. He is currently serving as a Subedar at the Indian Army.

=== Rowing career ===
Arjun Lal primarily competes in the men's lightweight double sculls, partnering mainly with Arvind Singh. The duo won a silver medal at the 2019 Asian Rowing Championships in South Korea, before representing India at the 2020 Summer Olympics in Tokyo, where they became first Indians to reach double sculls semifinal at Olympics.

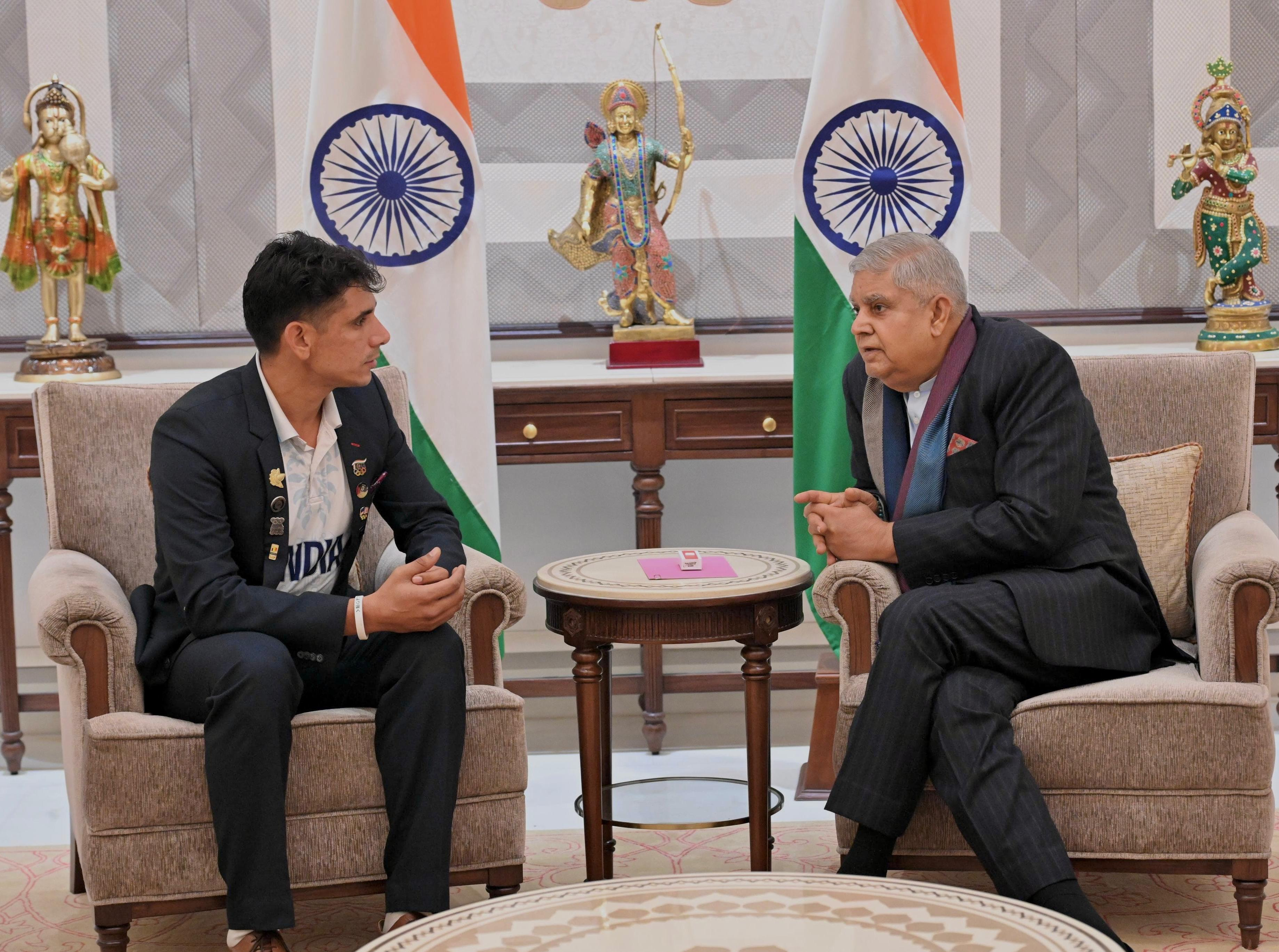
Arjun Lal with former vice president of India Jagdeep Dhankhar

In 2021, Arjun Lal, paired with Ravi, won the gold medal in the men's double sculls at the 2021 Asian Rowing Championships in Thailand, finishing the race in 6:57.883. This victory was India's second consecutive podium finish in men's double sculls at the continental championship. The following year, he and Arvind Singh secured gold at the 2022 Asian Rowing Championships and continued their domestic success by winning gold at the 2022 and 2023 National Games, along with multiple national titles in double sculls events.

At the 2022 Hangzhou Asian Games, Arjun Lal, and Arvind Singh won a silver medal in the men's lightweight double sculls, finishing behind China.

Arjun Lal's career has also included periods of injury and recovery. Prior to the Paris 2024 Olympic qualifiers, he sustained a back injury while training in China, causing him to miss the Olympic qualification event in South Korea and leading to his temporary reassignment to the Target Olympic Podium Scheme (TOPS) development group. He rehabilitated under guidance from a Border Security Force physiotherapist without formal medical supervision and resumed training in 2025. He participated in the Khelo India Water Sports Festival to assess his endurance and readiness ahead of national competitions and in preparation for the 2028 Los Angeles Olympics.

Beyond international events, Arjun has also been a performer in domestic rowing circuits. At the Open Sprint National Rowing Championships of India, he won silver medals in the Lightweight Men's Double Sculls in both 2018 and 2019, followed by another silver medal in the Double Sculls category at Pune in 2022. Continuing his form, he clinched the gold medal in the Lightweight Men's Double Sculls at Pune in 2023.
