= Rowing at the 2014 Asian Games – Men's double sculls =

Men's double sculls at the 2014 Asian Games
- Venue: Tangeum Lake
- Date: 21–25 September 2014
- Competitors: 22 from 11 nations

Medalists
gold medal	Zhang Liang; Dai Jun	China
silver medal	Wang Ming-hui; Yu Tsung-wei	Chinese Taipei
bronze medal	Mojtaba Shojaei; Amir Rahnama	Iran

The men's double sculls competition at the 2014 Asian Games in Chungju, South Korea was held from 21 September to 25 September at the Tangeum Lake International Rowing Center.

== Schedule ==
All times are Korea Standard Time (UTC+09:00)

Date	Time	Event
Sunday, 21 September 2014	10:00	Heats
Tuesday, 23 September 2014	10:00	Repechages
Thursday, 25 September 2014	10:00	Finals

== Results ==
=== Heat ===
- Qualification: 1 → Final A (FA), 2–6 → Repechages (R)

==== Heat 1 ====
Rank	Team	Time	Notes
1	China (CHN); Zhang Liang; Dai Jun	6:26.04	FA
2	Chinese Taipei (TPE); Wang Ming-hui; Yu Tsung-wei	6:36.74	R
3	India (IND); Om Prakash; Dattu Baban Bhokanal	6:41.67	R
4	Hong Kong (HKG); Law Hiu Fung; Wong Wai Kin	6:45.63	R
5	Philippines (PHI); Roque Abala; Alvin Amposta	6:53.66	R
6	Kuwait (KUW); Mohammad Al-Rubayei; Mohammad Sabti	8:10.63	R

==== Heat 2 ====
Rank	Team	Time	Notes
1	Kazakhstan (KAZ); Vladislav Yakovlev; Yevgeniy Vassilyev	6:37.02	FA
2	South Korea (KOR); Kim Hwi-gwan; Choi Do-sub	6:39.30	R
3	Iran (IRI); Mojtaba Shojaei; Amir Rahnama	6:39.59	R
4	Thailand (THA); Prem Nampratueng; Nawamin Deenoi	7:01.05	R
5	Uzbekistan (UZB); Yuriy Sukhovlyanskiy; Ruslan Naurzaliev	7:48.96	R

=== Repechages ===
- Qualification: 1–2 → Final A (FA), 3–5 → Final B (FB)

==== Repechage 1 ====
Rank	Team	Time	Notes
1	Chinese Taipei (TPE); Wang Ming-hui; Yu Tsung-wei	6:36.87	FA
2	Iran (IRI); Mojtaba Shojaei; Amir Rahnama	6:41.19	FA
3	Hong Kong (HKG); Law Hiu Fung; Wong Wai Kin	6:52.32	FB
4	Uzbekistan (UZB); Yuriy Sukhovlyanskiy; Ruslan Naurzaliev	7:02.98	FB
5	Kuwait (KUW); Mohammad Al-Rubayei; Mohammad Sabti	8:12.83	FB

==== Repechage 2 ====
Rank	Team	Time	Notes
1	India (IND); Om Prakash; Dattu Baban Bhokanal	6:40.77	FA
2	South Korea (KOR); Kim Hwi-gwan; Choi Do-sub	6:49.85	FA
3	Philippines (PHI); Roque Abala; Alvin Amposta	6:53.57	FB
4	Thailand (THA); Prem Nampratueng; Nawamin Deenoi	7:05.81	FB

=== Finals ===
==== Final B ====
Rank	Team	Time
1	Hong Kong (HKG); Law Hiu Fung; Wong Wai Kin	6:44.09
2	Philippines (PHI); Roque Abala; Alvin Amposta	6:50.86
3	Thailand (THA); Prem Nampratueng; Nawamin Deenoi	6:55.39
4	Uzbekistan (UZB); Yuriy Sukhovlyanskiy; Ruslan Naurzaliev	7:10.11
5	Kuwait (KUW); Mohammad Al-Rubayei; Mohammad Sabti	8:02.33

==== Final A ====
Rank	Team	Time
1st place, gold medalist(s)	China (CHN); Zhang Liang; Dai Jun	6:24.69
2nd place, silver medalist(s)	Chinese Taipei (TPE); Wang Ming-hui; Yu Tsung-wei	6:29.11
3rd place, bronze medalist(s)	Iran (IRI); Mojtaba Shojaei; Amir Rahnama	6:33.22
4	South Korea (KOR); Kim Hwi-gwan; Choi Do-sub	6:35.95
5	India (IND); Om Prakash; Dattu Baban Bhokanal	6:37.02
6	Kazakhstan (KAZ); Vladislav Yakovlev; Yevgeniy Vassilyev	6:39.54
