= Arvind Singh (rower) =

Indian rower (born 1996)

Subedar Arvind Singh
Personal information
- Full name: Arvind Singh Solanki
- Born: 17 June 1996 (age 30) Khabra village, Bulandshahr, Uttar Pradesh, India
- Height: 6 ft 1 in (184 cm)
- Military career
- Allegiance: India
- Branch: Indian Army
- Service years: 2016–present
- Rank: Subedar
- Unit: Bengal Engineer Group

Sport
- Country: India
- Sport: Rowing
Medal record
Men's rowing
Representing India
| Event | 1st | 2nd | 3rd |
|---|---|---|---|
| Asian Games | 0 | 1 | 0 |
| Asian Rowing Championships | 2 | 1 | 0 |
| Total | 2 | 2 | 0 |
Asian Games
| Silver medal – second place | 2022 Hangzhou | Lwt double sculls |
Asian Rowing Championships
| Gold medal – first place | 2022 Thailand | Lwt double sculls |
| Gold medal – first place | 2021 Thailand | Lwt single sculls |
| Silver medal – second place | 2019 Korea | Lwt double sculls |

Subedar Arvind Singh (born 17 June 1996) is an Indian professional rower. He represented India at the 2020 Summer Olympics in the men's lightweight double sculls. He is currently serving in the Indian Army.

== Early life and career ==
Singh was born on 17 June 1996 and comes from Khabra village in Bulandshahr district, Uttar Pradesh. He comes from a farming family. Before taking up rowing, he was interested in cricket and athletics.

Singh joined the Indian Army in 2016, serving in the Bengal Sappers regiment. After being introduced to the sport of rowing during his military service, he began training at the Army Rowing Node, based at the College of Military Engineering in Pune.

== International career ==
Singh competed at the 2019 World Rowing Championships in Linz, Austria, in the lightweight men's double sculls.

Singh qualified for the 2020 Summer Olympics after finishing second at the Asia/Oceania Continental Qualifying Regatta event in Tokyo, Japan, and on the allocation of an Asian & Oceania Qualification Regatta spot represented India in the men's lightweight double sculls. They finished fifth in their heat, advanced through the repechage and semifinal stages, and finished second in the B final, placing 11th overall.

Singh subsequently won the lightweight single sculls at the 2021 Asian Rowing Championships in Rayong, Thailand. He also won the lightweight single sculls at the 2022 National Championships in Pune.

At the 2022 Asian Games in Hangzhou, held in 2023, Singh and Arjun Lal Jat won the silver medal in the men's lightweight double sculls. They finished behind the Chinese crew of Fan Junjie and Man Sun.

In April 2024, Singh and Ujjwal Kumar finished third in the men's lightweight double sculls at the Asia-Oceania Olympic Qualification Regatta in Chungju, South Korea. As only the top two crews qualified for the 2024 Summer Olympics, the result left India without a quota place in the event.

In June 2026, Singh was included in the Target Olympic Podium Scheme Development Group announced by the Ministry of Youth Affairs and Sports. He was listed in the men's single sculls group as India prepared its rowing squad for the 2026 Asian Games.

== Arjuna award ==
On 13 November 2026, Singh was conferred with the Arjuna Award for 2025, for his achievements in rowing.
