= Rowing at the 2014 Asian Games – Men's single sculls =

Men's single sculls at the 2014 Asian Games
- Venue: Tangeum Lake
- Date: 21–25 September 2014
- Competitors: 8 from 8 nations

Medalists
gold medal	Mohsen Shadi	Iran
silver medal	Kim Dong-yong	South Korea
bronze medal	Sawarn Singh	India

The men's single sculls competition at the 2014 Asian Games in Chungju, South Korea was held from 21 September to 25 September at the Tangeum Lake International Rowing Center.

== Schedule ==
All times are Korea Standard Time (UTC+09:00)

Date	Time	Event
Sunday, 21 September 2014	10:30	Heats
Tuesday, 23 September 2014	10:20	Repechage
Thursday, 25 September 2014	11:15	Final

== Results ==
Legend

- DNS — Did not start

=== Heats ===
- Qualification: 1 → Final A (FA), 2–4 → Repechage (R)

==== Heat 1 ====
Rank	Athlete	Time	Notes
1	Mohsen Shadi (IRI)	7:08.21	FA
2	Sawarn Singh (IND)	7:10.65	R
3	Grigoriy Feklistov (KAZ)	7:38.98	R
4	Wang Ming-hui (TPE)	13:15.78	R

==== Heat 2 ====
Rank	Athlete	Time	Notes
1	Kim Dong-yong (KOR)	7:20.08	FA
2	La Memo (INA)	7:23.19	R
3	Artyom Kudryashov (UZB)	7:47.93	R
4	Nasser Al-Abdulla (QAT)	8:54.15	R

=== Repechage ===
- Qualification: 1–4 → Final A (FA), 5–6 → Final B (FB)

Rank	Athlete	Time	Notes
1	Sawarn Singh (IND)	7:10.93	FA
2	La Memo (INA)	7:13.14	FA
3	Artyom Kudryashov (UZB)	7:30.84	FA
4	Grigoriy Feklistov (KAZ)	7:32.94	FA
5	Nasser Al-Abdulla (QAT)	8:54.42	
—	Wang Ming-hui (TPE)	DNS	

=== Final ===
Rank	Athlete	Time
1st place, gold medalist(s)	Mohsen Shadi (IRI)	7:05.66
2nd place, silver medalist(s)	Kim Dong-yong (KOR)	7:06.17
3rd place, bronze medalist(s)	Sawarn Singh (IND)	7:10.65
4	La Memo (INA)	7:17.29
5	Artyom Kudryashov (UZB)	7:30.01
6	Grigoriy Feklistov (KAZ)	7:34.98
