= Rowing at the 2014 Asian Games – Women's lightweight quadruple sculls =

Women's lightweight quadruple sculls at the 2014 Asian Games
- Venue: Tangeum Lake
- Date: 20–24 September 2014
- Competitors: 28 from 7 nations

Medalists
gold medal	China; Guo Shuai, Pan Dandan, Chen Cuiming, Huang Wenyi
silver medal	Vietnam; Lê Thị An, Phạm Thị Huệ, Phạm Thị Thảo, Phạm Thị Hài
bronze medal	Iran; Homeira Barzegar, Nazanin Malaei, Mahsa Javer, Soulmaz Abbasi

The women's lightweight quadruple sculls competition at the 2014 Asian Games in Chungju, South Korea was held from 20 September to 24 September at the Tangeum Lake International Rowing Center.

== Schedule ==
All times are Korea Standard Time (UTC+09:00)

Date	Time	Event
Saturday, 20 September 2014	11:00	Heats
Monday, 22 September 2014	10:30	Repechage
Wednesday, 24 September 2014	10:40	Final

== Results ==
=== Heats ===
- Qualification: 1 → Final (FA), 2–4 → Repechage (R)

==== Heat 1 ====
Rank	Team	Time	Notes
1	Indonesia (INA); Syiva Lisdiana; Yuniarti; Yayah Rokayah; Maryam Magdalena Daimoi	6:59.98	FA
2	Iran (IRI); Homeira Barzegar; Nazanin Malaei; Mahsa Javer; Soulmaz Abbasi	7:00.22	R
3	Thailand (THA); Tippaporn Pitukpaothai; Mattika Maneekaew; Matinee Raruen; Sawittree Laksoongnoen	7:07.83	R
4	India (IND); Dittymol Varghese; Khumanthem Monalisa Chanu; Thangjam Chaoba Devi; Manjula Xess	7:10.24	R

==== Heat 2 ====
Rank	Team	Time	Notes
1	China (CHN); Guo Shuai; Pan Dandan; Chen Cuiming; Huang Wenyi	6:45.06	FA
2	Vietnam (VIE); Lê Thị An; Phạm Thị Huệ; Phạm Thị Thảo; Phạm Thị Hài	6:45.62	R
3	South Korea (KOR); Jeong Ji-hye; Jung Hye-won; Kim Sol-ji; Park Yeon-hee	6:57.21	R

=== Repechage ===
- Qualification: 1–4 → Final (FA)

Rank	Team	Time	Notes
1	Vietnam (VIE); Lê Thị An; Phạm Thị Huệ; Phạm Thị Thảo; Phạm Thị Hài	6:45.22	FA
2	South Korea (KOR); Jeong Ji-hye; Jung Hye-won; Kim Sol-ji; Park Yeon-hee	6:49.76	FA
3	Iran (IRI); Homeira Barzegar; Nazanin Malaei; Mahsa Javer; Soulmaz Abbasi	6:53.15	FA
4	Thailand (THA); Tippaporn Pitukpaothai; Mattika Maneekaew; Matinee Raruen; Sawittree Laksoongnoen	6:58.65	FA
5	India (IND); Dittymol Varghese; Khumanthem Monalisa Chanu; Thangjam Chaoba Devi; Manjula Xess	7:05.65	

=== Final ===
Rank	Team	Time
1st place, gold medalist(s)	China (CHN); Guo Shuai; Pan Dandan; Chen Cuiming; Huang Wenyi	7:25.09
2nd place, silver medalist(s)	Vietnam (VIE); Lê Thị An; Phạm Thị Huệ; Phạm Thị Thảo; Phạm Thị Hài	7:28.48
3rd place, bronze medalist(s)	Iran (IRI); Homeira Barzegar; Nazanin Malaei; Mahsa Javer; Soulmaz Abbasi	7:37.24
4	Thailand (THA); Tippaporn Pitukpaothai; Mattika Maneekaew; Matinee Raruen; Sawittree Laksoongnoen	7:49.48
5	Indonesia (INA); Syiva Lisdiana; Yuniarti; Yayah Rokayah; Maryam Magdalena Daimoi	7:50.02
6	South Korea (KOR); Jeong Ji-hye; Jung Hye-won; Kim Sol-ji; Park Yeon-hee	8:14.13
