= Ashish Phugat =

Indian rower

Ashish Phugat (born 3 July 1999) is an Indian rower. He competes in men's single sculls, and lightweight men's double sculls. He represents Services Sports Board in the National Championships.

== Career ==
Phugat was selected for the Indian team by the Rowing Federation of India to take part in the World Rowing Cup III at Lucerne, Switzerland in July 2023. In May 2022, he was part of the men's quadruple sculls without coxswain Indian team at the Rowing World Cup 1 in Belgrade, Serbia. In June 2022, he took part of the men's quadruple sculls without coxswain in the World Cup at Poznan.

In December 2021, he took part in the lightweight men's double sculls and won a silver along with teammate Sukhjinder Singh at the 2021 Asian Rowing Championships in Ban Chang, Thailand.

In August 2017, he won the men's single sculls event in the World Junior Championship.
