= Phạm Thị Thảo =

Vietnamese rower (born 1989)

Medal record

Representing Vietnam

Women's Rowing

Asian Games
Gold medal – first place	2018 Jakarta–Palembang	Lwt quadruple sculls
Silver medal – second place	2010 Guangzhou	Double sculls
Silver medal – second place	2014 Incheon	Lwt quadruple sculls
Bronze medal – third place	2014 Incheon	Quadruple sculls
Bronze medal – third place	2022 Hangzhou	Quadruple sculls

Asian Rowing Championships
Gold medal – first place	2022 Ban Chang	Lwt quadruple sculls
Silver medal – second place	2021 Ban Chang	Quadruple sculls
Silver medal – second place	2019 Chungju	Coxless four
Silver medal – second place	2015 Beijing	Lwt quadruple sculls
Silver medal – second place	2009 Yilan	Quadruple sculls
Bronze medal – third place	2022 Ban Chang	Double sculls
Bronze medal – third place	2021 Ban Chang	Coxless four
Bronze medal – third place	2019 Chungju	Quadruple sculls
Bronze medal – third place	2019 Chungju	Coxless pair

Southeast Asian Games
Gold medal – first place	2015 Singapore	Lwt doubles sculls 500 m
Gold medal – first place	2015 Singapore	Lwt doubles sculls 1000 m
Silver medal – second place	2013 Naypyidaw	Double sculls
Silver medal – second place	2013 Naypyidaw	Lwt coxless four

Phạm Thị Thảo (born 5 June 1989, Hanoi) is a Vietnamese rower. She competed in 2012 Summer Olympics in the women's lightweight double sculls with Pham Thi Hai. They were the first Vietnamese rowing team ever to qualify for the Olympic Games.
