= Sukhmeet Singh =

Indian rower (born 1994)

Personal information
- Nationality: Indian
- Born: 9 August 1994 (age 32) Kishangarh Pharwahi, Mansa, Punjab
- Height: 183 cm (6 ft 0 in)
- Weight: 75 kg (165 lb)
- Military career
- Allegiance: India
- Branch: Indian Army
- Service years: 2016–present
- Rank: Subedar

Sport
- Country: India
- Sport: Rowing
Medal record
Representing India
Asian Games
Gold medal – first place	2018 Jakarta	Quadruple sculls
Bronze medal – third place	2022 Hangzhou	Quadruple sculls
National Games
Gold medal – first place	2022 Gujarat	Quadruple sculls
Asian Championships
Silver medal – second place	2019 Chungju	Quadruple sculls
Bronze medal – third place	2019 Chungju	Double sculls
Silver medal – second place	2021 Thailand	Quadruple sculls
Silver medal – second place	2022 Thailand	Double sculls
National Championships
Silver medal – second place	2017 Pune	Double Sculls
Gold medal – first place	2019 Hyderabad	Double sculls
Gold medal – first place	2021 Pune	Double sculls

Sukhmeet Singh is an Indian rower and an Indian Army junior commissioned officer. He was a member of the team who won the gold medal at the 2018 Asian Games in Men's Quadruple sculls. He was also a member of the team who won the bronze medal at the 2022 Asian Games in the Men's Quadruple sculls event. He was born on 9 August 1994 at Kishangarh Pharwahi, in district Mansa, Punjab.

== Career ==
- 2023: In September, he won a Bronze medal as part of the Indian teams in the men's quadruple sculls at the 2022 Asian Games.
