= Sawarn Singh =

Indian rower

Personal information
- Nationality: Indian
- Born: 20 February 1990 (age 36) Dalelwala Mansa, Punjab, India
- Height: 188 cm (6 ft 2 in)
- Weight: 97 kg (214 lb)

Sport
- Country: India
- Sport: Rowing
Medal record
Representing India
Asian Games
| Bronze medal – third place | 2014 Incheon | Single sculls |
| Gold medal – first place | 2018 Jakarta | Quadruple sculls |
Asian Championships
| Gold medal – first place | 2013 Lu'an | Single sculls |
| Silver medal – second place | 2019 Chungju | Quadruple sculls |
| Bronze medal – third place | 2011 Hwacheon | Single sculls |
| Bronze medal – third place | 2019 Chungju | Double sculls |

Sawarn Singh (Punjabi: ਸਵਰਨ ਸਿੰਘ, born 20 February 1990 in Dalelwala Mansa, Punjab, India) is an Indian rower. He primarily competes in single scull events. In 2011 he won bronze at the Asian Rowing Championships. He qualified for 2012 Summer Olympics in Men's single scull event and reached the last 16 with a time of 7:00.49 in the first repechage. The 21-year-old Sawarn Singh Virk secured his spot in the London Olympics by winning his event at the FISA Olympic Continental Qualification Regatta for Asia in Chung Ju, Korea. London Olympics was the maiden Olympics appearance for the Jharkhand National Games gold medallist. He won the 2013 Asian Championships, and won bronze at the 2014 Asian Games. He won the gold medal in the 2018 Asian Games in Men's Quadruple sculls.

== Major events ==
| Event | Place | Class | Time | Position |
|---|---|---|---|---|
| 2011 World Rowing Championships | Slovenia | M1x | 7:04.79 | 17 |
| 2011 Asian Rowing Championships | Korea | M1x | 7:11.83 | 3 |
| 2012 Summer Olympics | London | M1x | 7:29.66 | 16 |
| 2013 Asian Rowing Championships | China | M1x | 7:31.88 | 1 |
| 2014 Asian Games | South Korea | M1x | 7:10.65 | 3 |
| 2018 Asian Games | Indonesia | M4x | 6:17.13 | 1 |

| S. No | Game Year | City | Achievements |
|---|---|---|---|
| 1. | 34th National Game | Jharkhand | Gold |
| 2. | World Rowing Championship | Slovenia | 17th Place |
| 3. | Asian Olympic Qualification Regatta | South Korea | Gold |
| 4. | 30th Olympic Games | London | 16th Place |
| 5. | World Rowing Championship | South Korea | 12th Place |
| 6. | Paolod' Aloja International Regatta | Italy | 5th Place |
