= Rowing at the 2022 Asian Games – Men's lightweight double sculls =

Men's lightweight double sculls at the 2022 Asian Games
- Venue: Fuyang Water Sports Centre
- Date: 20–24 September 2022
- Competitors: 24 from 12 nations

Medalists
gold medal	Fan Junjie; Sun Man	China
silver medal	Arjun Lal Jat; Arvind Singh	India
bronze medal	Shakhzod Nurmatov; Sobirjon Safaroliev	Uzbekistan

The men's lightweight double sculls competition at the 2022 Asian Games in Hangzhou, China, is held from 20 September to 24 September 2023 at the Fuyang Water Sports Centre. The gold medal was won by Chinese pair, Fan Junjie and Sun Man.

== Schedule ==
All times are China Standard Time (UTC+08:00)

Date	Time	Event
Wednesday, 20 September 2023	09:20	Heats
Thursday, 21 September 2023	09:20	Repecharges
Sunday, 24 September 2023	09:20	Finals

== Results ==
=== Heats ===
- Qualification: 1 → Final A (FA), 2–6 → Repechages (R)

==== Heat 1 ====
Rank	Team	Time	Notes
1	China (CHN); Fan Junjie; Sun Man	6:14.97	FA
2	India (IND); Arjun Lal Jat; Arvind Singh	6:27.45	R
3	Kazakhstan (KAZ); Anastas Shashkov; Alexandr Afanasyev	6:29.82	R
4	Japan (JPN); Masayuki Miyaura; Masahiro Takeda	6:35.03	R
5	Thailand (THA); Siwakorn Wongpin; Nawamin Dechudomrat	6:36.44	R
6	Saudi Arabia (KSA); Turky Al-Aref; Sultan Al-Shali	6:54.20	R

==== Heat 2 ====
Rank	Team	Time	Notes
1	Uzbekistan (UZB); Shakhzod Nurmatov; Sobirjon Safaroliev	6:20.00	FA
2	Hong Kong (HKG); Chan Tik Lun; Chan Chi Fung	6:25.84	R
3	Pakistan (PAK); Asad Iqbal; Muzamil Shahzad	6:31.55	R
4	Indonesia (INA); Andryan Pardomuan; Rafiq Wijdan Yasir	6:31.98	R
5	Philippines (PHI); Edgar Ilas; Zuriel Sumintac	6:48.82	R
6	South Korea (KOR); Sim Hyun-bo; Kang Ji-su	6:49.65	R

=== Repechages ===
- Qualification: 1–2 → Final A (FA), 3–5 → Final B (FB)

==== Repechage 1 ====
Rank	Team	Time	Notes
1	India (IND); Arjun Lal Jat; Arvind Singh	6:55.78	FA
2	Japan (JPN); Masayuki Miyaura; Masahiro Takeda	7:05.91	FA
3	Philippines (PHI); Edgar Ilas; Zuriel Sumintac	7:10.97	FB
4	Pakistan (PAK); Asad Iqbal; Muzamil Shahzad	7:13.99	FB
5	Saudi Arabia (KSA); Turky Al-Aref; Sultan Al-Shali	7:28.44	FB

==== Repechage 2 ====
Rank	Team	Time	Notes
1	Hong Kong (HKG); Chan Tik Lun; Chan Chi Fung	6:55.43	FA
2	South Korea (KOR); Sim Hyun-bo; Kang Ji-su	6:55.88	FA
3	Indonesia (INA); Andryan Pardomuan; Rafiq Wijdan Yasir	7:01.56	FB
4	Kazakhstan (KAZ); Anastas Shashkov; Alexandr Afanasyev	7:03.32	FB
5	Thailand (THA); Siwakorn Wongpin; Nawamin Dechudomrat	7:09.62	FB

=== Finals ===
==== Final B ====
Rank	Team	Time
1	Kazakhstan (KAZ); Anastas Shashkov; Alexandr Afanasyev	6:38.53
2	Indonesia (INA); Andryan Pardomuan; Rafiq Wijdan Yasir	6:40.73
3	Pakistan (PAK); Asad Iqbal; Muzamil Shahzad	6:43.84
4	Thailand (THA); Siwakorn Wongpin; Nawamin Dechudomrat	6:45.21
5	Philippines (PHI); Edgar Ilas; Zuriel Sumintac	6:51.81
6	Saudi Arabia (KSA); Turky Al-Aref; Sultan Al-Shali	6:56.63

==== Final A ====
Rank	Team	Time
1st place, gold medalist(s)	China (CHN); Fan Junjie; Sun Man	6:23.16
2nd place, silver medalist(s)	India (IND); Arjun Lal Jat; Arvind Singh	6:28.18
3rd place, bronze medalist(s)	Uzbekistan (UZB); Shakhzod Nurmatov; Sobirjon Safaroliev	6:33.42
4	South Korea (KOR); Sim Hyun-bo; Kang Ji-su	6:37.90
5	Japan (JPN); Masayuki Miyaura; Masahiro Takeda	6:39.11
6	Hong Kong (HKG); Chan Tik Lun; Chan Chi Fung	6:39.85
