= Chelsea Corputty =

Indonesian rower (born 1995)

Personal information
- Born: 4 May 1995 (age 31) Ambon, Maluku, Indonesia
- Height: 1.70 m (5 ft 7 in)

Sport
- Country: Indonesia
- Sport: Rowing
Medal record
Women's rowing
Representing Indonesia
Asian Games
Bronze medal – third place	2018 Jakarta–Palembang	Coxless four
Bronze medal – third place	2022 Hangzhou	Lightweight double sculls
Asian Championships
Bronze medal – third place	2017 Pattaya	Lightweight quadruple sculls
Bronze medal – third place	2021 Ban Chang	Quadruple sculls
SEA Games
Silver medal – second place	2015 Singapore	Lightweight four 1000 m
Silver medal – second place	2021 Vietnam	Coxless four
Silver medal – second place	2021 Vietnam	Lightweight coxless four
Silver medal – second place	2021 Vietnam	Pair
Bronze medal – third place	2025 Thailand	Quadruple sculls
Women's coastal rowing
Representing Indonesia
Asian Beach Games
Gold medal – first place	2016 Da Nang	Solo

Chelsea Corputty (born 4 May 1995) is an Indonesian rower. She won the bronze medal in the women's coxless four event at the 2018 Asian Games held in Jakarta and Palembang, Indonesia.

She has also won medals at the Asian Rowing Championships and the SEA Games.

She won the gold medal in the women's solo coastal rowing competition at the 2016 Asian Beach Games held in Da Nang, Vietnam.
