= Rowing at the 2018 Asian Games – Women's lightweight quadruple sculls =

Women's lightweight quadruple sculls at the 2018 Asian Games
- Venue: Jakabaring Lake
- Date: 19–23 August 2018
- Competitors: 28 from 7 nations

Medalists
gold medal	Vietnam; Lường Thị Thảo, Hồ Thị Lý, Tạ Thanh Huyền, Phạm Thị Thảo
silver medal	Iran; Maryam Karami, Mahsa Javer, Nazanin Rahmani, Maryam Omidi Parsa
bronze medal	South Korea; Jung Hye-ri, Ku Bo-yeun, Choi Yu-ri, Ji Yoo-jin

The women's lightweight quadruple sculls competition at the 2018 Asian Games was held on 19–23 August at the JSC Lake.

== Schedule ==
All times are Western Indonesia Time (UTC+07:00)

Date	Time	Event
Sunday, 19 August 2018	11:20	Heats
Tuesday, 21 August 2018	10:10	Repechage
Thursday, 23 August 2018	11:25	Final

== Results ==
=== Heats ===
- Qualification: 1 → Final (FA), 2–4 → Repechage (R)

==== Heat 1 ====
Rank	Team	Time	Notes
1	Iran (IRI); Maryam Karami; Mahsa Javer; Nazanin Rahmani; Maryam Omidi Parsa	7:23.45	FA
2	Thailand (THA); Phuttharaksa Neegree; Tippaporn Pitukpaothai; Rojjana Raklao; Matinee Raruen	7:32.64	R
2	Indonesia (INA); Wahyuni; Melani Putri; Yuniarti; Syiva Lisdiana	7:41.18	R
4	Chinese Taipei (TPE); Chiu Chin-yu; Lee Kuan-yi; Hua Yi-an; Hsieh I-ching	7:46.38	R

==== Heat 2 ====
Rank	Team	Time	Notes
1	Vietnam (VIE); Lường Thị Thảo; Hồ Thị Lý; Tạ Thanh Huyền; Phạm Thị Thảo	7:24.57	FA
2	South Korea (KOR); Jung Hye-ri; Ku Bo-yeun; Choi Yu-ri; Ji Yoo-jin	7:31.13	R
3	Hong Kong (HKG); Loo Ka Fu; Wong Sheung Yee; Hui Wing Ki; Lee Yuen Yin	7:46.88	R

=== Repechage ===
- Qualification: 1–4 → Final (FA)

Rank	Team	Time	Notes
1	South Korea (KOR); Jung Hye-ri; Ku Bo-yeun; Choi Yu-ri; Ji Yoo-jin	7:25.38	FA
2	Thailand (THA); Phuttharaksa Neegree; Tippaporn Pitukpaothai; Rojjana Raklao; Matinee Raruen	7:29.95	FA
3	Chinese Taipei (TPE); Hua Yi-an; Chiu Chin-yu; Lee Kuan-yi; Hsieh I-ching	7:35.76	FA
4	Indonesia (INA); Wahyuni; Melani Putri; Yuniarti; Syiva Lisdiana	7:36.60	FA
5	Hong Kong (HKG); Loo Ka Fu; Wong Sheung Yee; Hui Wing Ki; Lee Yuen Yin	7:38.08	

=== Final ===
Rank	Team	Time
1st place, gold medalist(s)	Vietnam (VIE); Lường Thị Thảo; Hồ Thị Lý; Tạ Thanh Huyền; Phạm Thị Thảo	7:01.11
2nd place, silver medalist(s)	Iran (IRI); Maryam Karami; Mahsa Javer; Nazanin Rahmani; Maryam Omidi Parsa	7:04.38
3rd place, bronze medalist(s)	South Korea (KOR); Jung Hye-ri; Ku Bo-yeun; Choi Yu-ri; Ji Yoo-jin	7:06.22
4	Thailand (THA); Phuttharaksa Neegree; Tippaporn Pitukpaothai; Rojjana Raklao; Matinee Raruen	7:10.85
5	Chinese Taipei (TPE); Hua Yi-an; Chiu Chin-yu; Lee Kuan-yi; Hsieh I-ching	7:14.66
6	Indonesia (INA); Wahyuni; Melani Putri; Yuniarti; Syiva Lisdiana	7:23.77
