= Liu Tingting =

Liu Tingting is the name of:

- Liu Tingting (hammer thrower) (born 1990), Chinese hammer thrower
- Liu Tingting (rower) (born 1990), Chinese rower
- Liu Tingting (gymnast) (born 2000), Chinese gymnast
