= Prem Nampratueng =

Thai rower (born 1995)

Personal information
- Born: 4 June 1995 (age 31)

Sport
- Country: Thailand
- Sport: Rowing
Medal record
Men's rowing
Representing Thailand
Asian Games
Bronze medal – third place	2018 Jakarta-Palembang	Double sculls
Bronze medal – third place	2018 Jakarta-Palembang	Quadruple sculls
Southeast Asian Games
Silver medal – second place	2021 Hanoi	Double sculls
Bronze medal – third place	2015 Singapore	Single sculls 500 m
Bronze medal – third place	2021 Hanoi	Quadruple sculls
Asian Rowing Championships
Silver medal – second place	2022 Ban Chang	Single sculls
Bronze medal – third place	2016 Jiashan	Double sculls
Bronze medal – third place	2017 Pattaya	Double sculls
Bronze medal – third place	2017 Pattaya	Quadruple sculls

Prem Nampratueng (born 4 June 1995) is a Thai rower. He won the bronze medal in the men's double sculls and men's quadruple sculls events at the 2018 Asian Games held in Jakarta and Palembang, Indonesia. He has also won medals at the Asian Rowing Championships and the Southeast Asian Games.

He competed in the men's double sculls and men's quadruple sculls events at the 2014 Asian Games held in Chungju, South Korea.
