= La Memo =

Indonesian rower (born 1995)

Memo
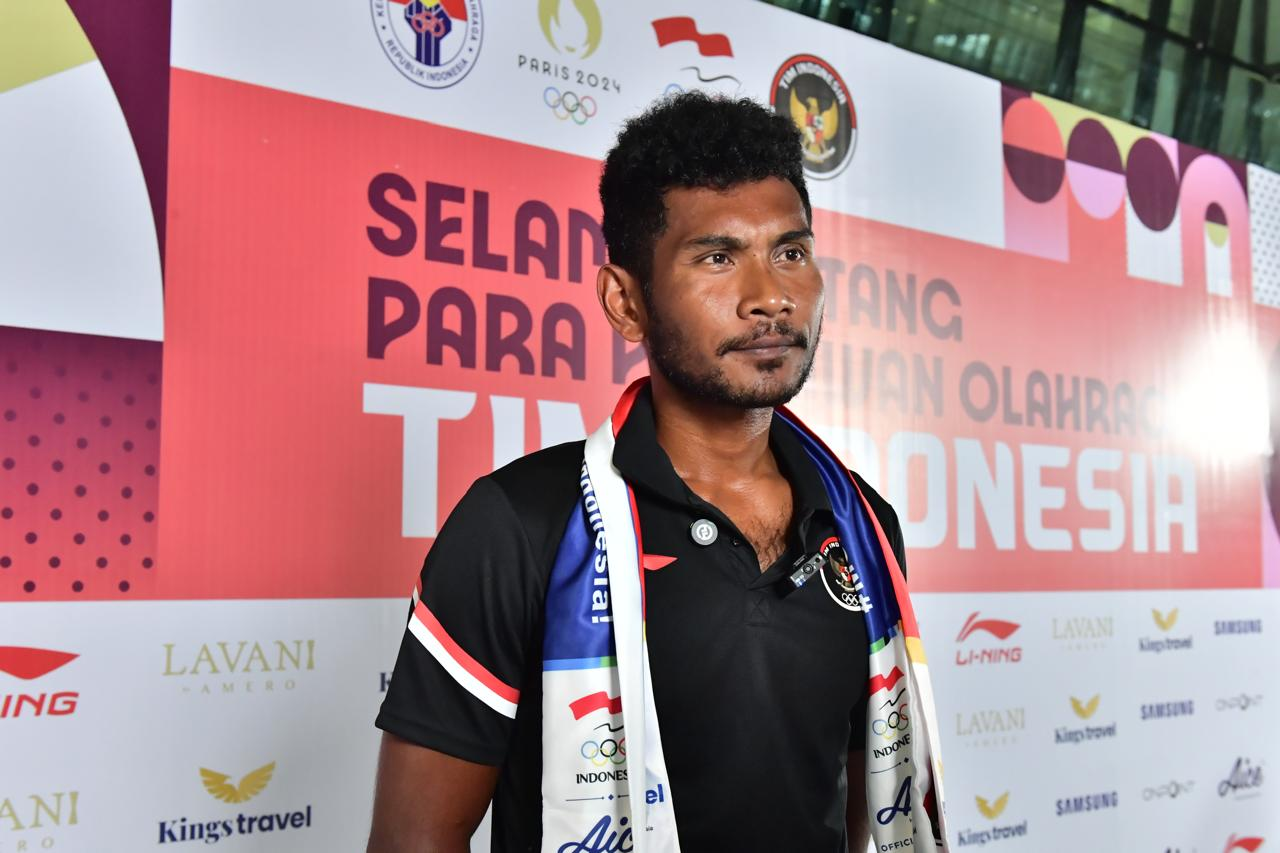
- 2024 Paris

Personal information
- Nationality: Indonesian
- Born: La Memo; 8 January 1995 (age 31) Osi Island, West Seram, Maluku, Indonesia
- Height: 1.92 m (6 ft 4 in)
- Weight: 88 kg (194 lb)

Sport
- Sport: Rowing
Medal record
Men's rowing
Representing Indonesia
Asian Games
Silver medal – second place	2018 Jakarta–Palembang	Quadruple sculls
Silver medal – second place	2026 Aichi–Nagoya	Quadruple sculls
Bronze medal – third place	2022 Hangzhou	Double sculls
Asian Championships
Gold medal – first place	2022 Ban Chang	Double sculls
Silver medal – second place	2017 Pattaya	Quadruple sculls
Bronze medal – third place	2015 Beijing	Quadruple sculls
Bronze medal – third place	2021 Ban Chang	Single sculls
SEA Games
Gold medal – first place	2015 Singapore	Single sculls 500 m
Gold medal – first place	2015 Singapore	Single sculls 1,000 m
Gold medal – first place	2021 Vietnam	Double sculls
Gold medal – first place	2021 Vietnam	Quadruple sculls
Gold medal – first place	2025 Thailand	Single sculls
Gold medal – first place	2025 Thailand	Double sculls
Bronze medal – third place	2013 Naypyidaw	Single sculls

La Memo (born 8 January 1995) is an Indonesian rower. He competed at the 2016 Summer Olympics in Rio de Janeiro, in the men's single sculls. He is one of the first Indonesians to compete in rowing at the Olympics alongside Dewi Yuliawati. He qualified for the Olympics because of his performance at the 2016 Asia & Oceania Continental Qualification Regatta in Chungju, South Korea.

He also competed for Indonesia at the 2024 Summer Olympics.
