= Rowing at the 2014 Asian Games – Men's lightweight single sculls =

Men's lightweight single sculls at the 2014 Asian Games
- Venue: Tangeum Lake
- Date: 20–24 September 2014
- Competitors: 11 from 11 nations

Medalists
| gold medal | Lok Kwan Hoi | Hong Kong |
| silver medal | Lee Hak-beom | South Korea |
| bronze medal | Dushyant Chauhan | India |

The men's lightweight single sculls competition at the 2014 Asian Games in Chungju, South Korea was held from 20 September to 24 September at the Tangeum Lake International Rowing Center.

== Schedule ==
All times are Korea Standard Time (UTC+09:00)

| Date | Time | Event |
|---|---|---|
| Saturday, 20 September 2014 | 10:10 | Heats |
| Monday, 22 September 2014 | 10:00 | Repechage |
| Wednesday, 24 September 2014 | 10:00 | Finals |

== Results ==
Legend

- DSQ — Disqualified

=== Heats ===
- Qualification: 1–2 → Final A (FA), 3–6 → Repechage (R)

==== Heat 1 ====
| Rank | Athlete | Time | Notes |
|---|---|---|---|
| 1 | Lok Kwan Hoi (HKG) | 7:17.78 | FA |
| 2 | Pak Chol-hun (PRK) | 7:24.30 | FA |
| 3 | Artyom Kudryashov (UZB) | 7:34.32 | R |
| 4 | Benjamin Tolentino (PHI) | 7:37.05 | R |
| 5 | Nguyễn Văn Linh (VIE) | 7:39.23 | R |
| — | Badreddin Al-Madani (QAT) | DSQ | |

==== Heat 2 ====
| Rank | Athlete | Time | Notes |
|---|---|---|---|
| 1 | Lee Hak-beom (KOR) | 7:19.45 | FA |
| 2 | Dushyant Chauhan (IND) | 7:23.94 | FA |
| 3 | Aghel Habibian (IRI) | 7:38.36 | R |
| 4 | Abdul Rehman (PAK) | 8:13.75 | R |
| 5 | Moayed Al-Suwaidan (KUW) | 8:24.23 | R |

=== Repechage ===
- Qualification: 1–2 → Final A (FA), 3–6 → Final B (FB)

| Rank | Athlete | Time | Notes |
|---|---|---|---|
| 1 | Aghel Habibian (IRI) | 7:17.30 | FA |
| 2 | Artyom Kudryashov (UZB) | 7:22.79 | FA |
| 3 | Nguyễn Văn Linh (VIE) | 7:23.51 | FB |
| 4 | Benjamin Tolentino (PHI) | 7:25.87 | FB |
| 5 | Abdul Rehman (PAK) | 8:05.79 | FB |
| 6 | Moayed Al-Suwaidan (KUW) | 8:14.45 | FB |

=== Finals ===
==== Final B ====
| Rank | Athlete | Time |
|---|---|---|
| 1 | Benjamin Tolentino (PHI) | 7:35.98 |
| 2 | Nguyễn Văn Linh (VIE) | 7:37.55 |
| 3 | Abdul Rehman (PAK) | 8:11.36 |
| 4 | Moayed Al-Suwaidan (KUW) | 8:24.53 |

==== Final A ====
| Rank | Athlete | Time |
|---|---|---|
| 1st place, gold medalist(s) | Lok Kwan Hoi (HKG) | 7:25.04 |
| 2nd place, silver medalist(s) | Lee Hak-beom (KOR) | 7:25.95 |
| 3rd place, bronze medalist(s) | Dushyant Chauhan (IND) | 7:26.57 |
| 4 | Aghel Habibian (IRI) | 7:27.67 |
| 5 | Pak Chol-hun (PRK) | 7:39.37 |
| 6 | Artyom Kudryashov (UZB) | 7:46.02 |
