= Soulmaz Abbasi =

Iranian rower (born 1984)

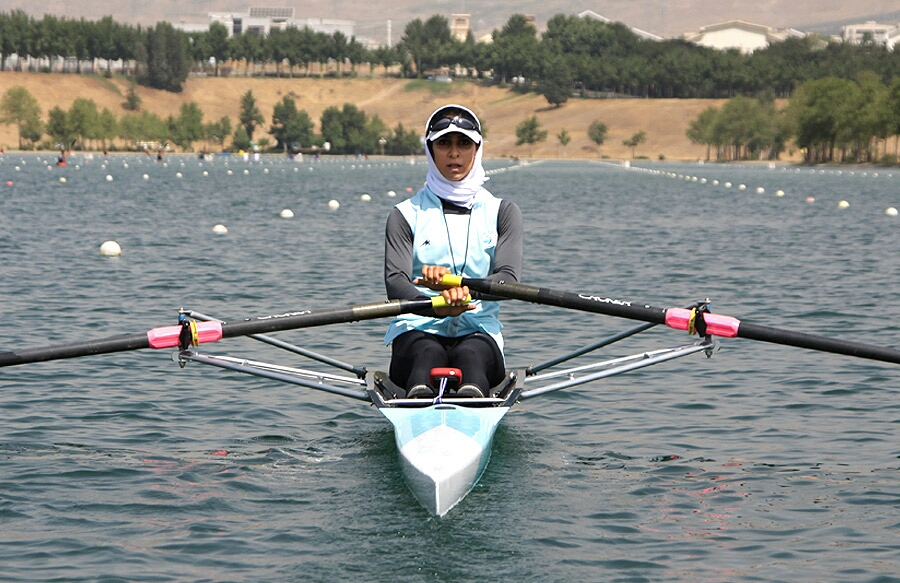
- Soulmaz Abbasi at the 2012 Summer Olympics

Personal information
- Full name: Soulmaz Abbasi Azad
- Nationality: Iran
- Born: January 19, 1984 (age 42) Tehran, Iran
- Years active: 2009–present
- Height: 1.74 m (5 ft 9 in)
- Weight: 59 kg (130 lb)

Sport
- Country: Iran
- Sport: Rowing
- Coached by: Colin Barat, Mike Hill
Medal record
Women's rowing
Representing Iran
Asian Games
Bronze medal – third place	2010 Guangzhou	LW4x
Bronze medal – third place	2014 Incheon	LW1x
Bronze medal – third place	2014 Incheon	LW4x
Asian Championships
Silver medal – second place	2013 Lu'an	LW4x

Soulmaz Abbasi Azad (Persian: سولماز عباسی آزاد, born 19 January 1984 in Tehran) is an Iranian rower. She competed in the single sculls race at the 2012 Summer Olympics and placed 6th in Final D and 24th overall.
