= Dewi Yuliawati =

Indonesian rower (born 1997)

Personal information
- Nationality: Indonesian
- Born: 2 June 1997 (age 29) Tangerang, Banten, Indonesia

Sport
- Sport: Rowing
Medal record
Women's Rowing
Representing Indonesia
Asian Championships
Silver medal – second place	2015 Beijing	Single Sculls
Bronze medal – third place	2015 Beijing	Quadrupe Sculls

Dewi Yuliawati (born 2 June 1997) is an Indonesian competitive rower.

She competed at the 2016 Summer Olympics in Rio de Janeiro, in the women's single sculls.
