= Rowing at the 2026 Asian Games – Men's lightweight single sculls =

Men's lightweight single sculls at the 2026 Asian Games
- Venue: Nagaragawa International Regatta Course
- Date: 23–24 September 2026
- Competitors: 11 from 11 nations

Medalists
gold medal	Chiu Hin Chun	Hong Kong
silver medal	Amir Hossein Mahmoudpour	Iran
bronze medal	Park Hyun-su	South Korea

The men's lightweight single sculls competition at the 2026 Asian Games was held from 23 to 24 September 2026 at the Nagaragawa International Regatta Course, Gifu, Japan.

== Schedule ==
All times are Japan Standard Time (UTC+09:00)

Date	Time	Event
Wednesday, 23 September 2026	14:30	Heats
Thursday, 24 September 2026	14:50	Finals

== Results ==
=== Heats ===
- Qualification: 1–2 + next 2 fastest → Final A (FA), Rest → Final B (FB)

==== Heat 1 ====
Rank	Athlete	Time	Notes
1	Amir Hossein Mahmoudpour (IRI)	7:24.74	FA
2	Firdavs Akhunov (UZB)	7:28.13	FA
3	Artem Matussevich (KAZ)	7:32.98	FA
4	Asad Iqbal (PAK)	7:43.54	FB
5	Edgar Ilas (PHI)	7:55.58	FB
6	Youssef El-Mays (LBN)	8:20.10	FB

==== Heat 2 ====
Rank	Athlete	Time	Notes
1	Chiu Hin Chun (HKG)	7:19.52	FA
2	Park Hyun-su (KOR)	7:21.40	FA
3	Phasin Chueatai (THA)	7:28.07	FA
4	Ajay Tyagi (IND)	7:35.27	FB
5	Mohamed Nafiran (SRI)	8:07.73	FB

=== Finals ===
==== Final B ====
Rank	Athlete	Time
1	Ajay Tyagi (IND)	7:01.54
2	Asad Iqbal (PAK)	7:06.72
3	Edgar Ilas (PHI)	7:23.78
4	Mohamed Nafiran (SRI)	7:28.22
5	Youssef El-Mays (LBN)	7:46.52

==== Final A ====
Rank	Athlete	Time
1st place, gold medalist(s)	Chiu Hin Chun (HKG)	6:50.32
2nd place, silver medalist(s)	Amir Hossein Mahmoudpour (IRI)	6:52.59
3rd place, bronze medalist(s)	Park Hyun-su (KOR)	6:53.35
4	Artem Matussevich (KAZ)	7:02.34
5	Phasin Chueatai (THA)	7:03.19
6	Firdavs Akhunov (UZB)	7:09.21
