= Rowing at the 2014 Asian Games – Women's lightweight single sculls =

Women's lightweight single sculls at the 2014 Asian Games
- Venue: Tangeum Lake
- Date: 21–25 September 2014
- Competitors: 4 from 4 nations

Medalists
gold medal	Ji Yoo-jin	South Korea
silver medal	Lee Ka Man	Hong Kong
bronze medal	Soulmaz Abbasi	Iran

The women's lightweight single sculls competition at the 2014 Asian Games in Chungju, South Korea was held from 21 September to 25 September at the Tangeum Lake International Rowing Center.

== Schedule ==
All times are Korea Standard Time (UTC+09:00)

Date	Time	Event
Sunday, 21 September 2014	10:50	Heat
Thursday, 25 September 2014	11:30	Final

== Results ==
=== Heat ===
- Qualification: 1–4 → Final (FA)

Rank	Athlete	Time	Notes
1	Ji Yoo-jin (KOR)	8:11.89	FA
2	Lee Ka Man (HKG)	8:18.24	FA
3	Saiyidah Aisyah (SIN)	8:24.86	FA
4	Soulmaz Abbasi (IRI)	8:31.26	FA

=== Final ===
Rank	Athlete	Time
1st place, gold medalist(s)	Ji Yoo-jin (KOR)	8:01.00
2nd place, silver medalist(s)	Lee Ka Man (HKG)	8:06.60
3rd place, bronze medalist(s)	Soulmaz Abbasi (IRI)	8:10.53
4	Saiyidah Aisyah (SIN)	8:17.84
