= Tạ Thanh Huyền =

Vietnamese rower (born 1994)

Medal record

Representing Vietnam

Women's Rowing

Asian Games
Gold medal – first place	2018 Jakarta	Lightweight quadruple sculls
Bronze medal – third place	2014 Incheon	Single sculls

Asian Rowing Championships
Gold medal – first place	2017 Pattaya	Lightweight quadruple sculls
Silver medal – second place	2019 Chungju	Lightweight quadruple sculls
Silver medal – second place	2015 Beijing	Lightweight quadruple sculls
Bronze medal – third place	2016 Jiashan	Quadruple sculls
Bronze medal – third place	2016 Jiashan	Lightweight quadruple sculls

Southeast Asian Games
Gold medal – first place	2015 Singapore	Lightweight doubles sculls 500 m
Gold medal – first place	2015 Singapore	Lightweight doubles sculls 1,000 m

Tạ Thanh Huyền (born May 3, 1994, in Thái Bình province, Vietnam) is a Vietnamese rower. She and Hồ Thị Lý placed 18th in the women's lightweight double sculls event at the 2016 Summer Olympics.
