= Dalelwala =

- town
- Location in Punjab, India
- Coordinates: 29.828694°N 75.41478°E
- Country: India
- State: Punjab
- District: Mansa
- Talukas: budhlada

Population (2011)
  - Total: 2,765

Languages
  - Official: Punjabi (Gurmukhi)
  - Regional: Punjabi
- Time zone: UTC+5:30 (IST)
- Nearest city: Mansa
- Sex ratio: 1000/873 ♂/♀

Dalelwala, sometimes spelled Dalelwala, is a town in the Budhlada tehsil of Mansa district in East Punjab, India. It is also a block of the district. Punjabi is the mother tongue as well as the official language here.

== Education and others ==
There are many schools and for higher education, students goes to the nearby cities.

SchoolsGovernment High School, Dalelwala

1. Baba Farid Public School

Colleges near by

Guru Teg Bahadur College of Education, Dalelwala, Mansa.

Nangal Road Dalelwala (District Mansa) Punjab, India.

Goernment College, Mansa

1. National Post Graduate College, Bhikhi
2. S. D. Kanya Mahavidyala

== Dalelwala info ==
Dalel Wala is a village in Jhunir Mandal in Mansa District in Punjab State in India. Dalel Wala is 18.65 km (11.59 mi) from its District Main City Mansa, and 180 km (110 mi) from its State Main City Chandigarh.

Bajewala, Bana Wala, Beerae Wala Jattan, Behniwal, Bhalike, Bhamme Kalan, Bhamme Khurd, Buraj Bhalike, Chachuhar, Chaine Wala, Chappian Wali, ... . are the villages along with this village in the same Jhunir Mandal

Nearby villages are Danewala (3.3 km), Nandgarh (3.9 km), Lakhmirwala (3.9 km), Malko (4.3 km), Alampur Mandran (4.7 km), Tahlian (5.9 km), Deluana (6.5 km)

== Noted sportspersons ==
Indian rowers Swaran Singh Virk and Parminder Singh are from this village.
