= Mahsa Javer =

Iranian rower (born 1994)

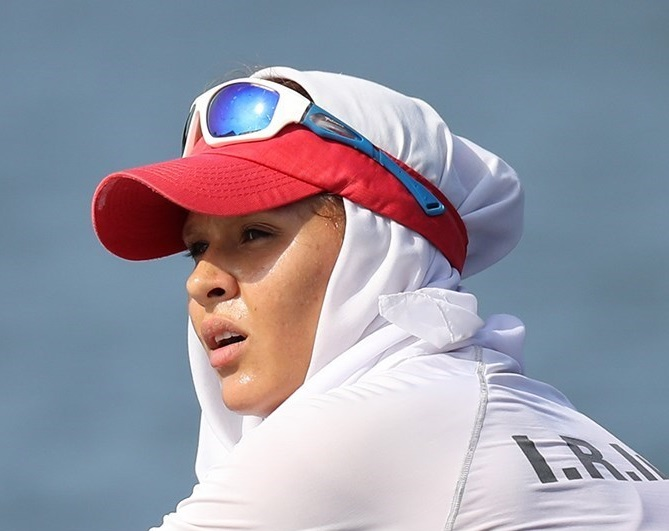
- Mahsa Javer claimed a silver medal in the women's double sculls of the 2022 Asian Games

Personal information
- Nationality: Iranian
- Born: 12 June 1994 (age 32) Zanjan, Iran
- Height: 1.73 m (5 ft 8 in)
- Weight: 62 kg (137 lb)
- Website: Official Instagram Profile

Sport
- Sport: Rowing
Medal record
Women's rowing
Representing Iran
Asian Games
Silver medal – second place	2018 Jakarta–Palembang	LW4x
Silver medal – second place	2022 Hangzhou	W2x
Silver medal – second place	2022 Hangzhou	W4x
Silver medal – second place	2026 Aichi–Nagoya	W4x
Bronze medal – third place	2014 Incheon	LW4x
Asian Championships
Gold medal – first place	2017 Pattaya	W2x
Gold medal – first place	2017 Pattaya	W4x
Gold medal – first place	2022 Ban Chang	W2x
Silver medal – second place	2013 Lu'an	LW4X
Bronze medal – third place	2015 Beijing	W1x
Bronze medal – third place	2016 Jiashan	W1x
Bronze medal – third place	2016 Jiashan	W4−

Mahsa Javer (Persian: مهسا جاور, born 12 June 1994) is an Iranian competitive rower. She competed at the 2016 Summer Olympics in Rio de Janeiro, in the women's single sculls.

== Olympic ==
At the Olympic qualifying events in April 2016 she came second to Huang Yi-ting. Following her qualification for the Olympics, she was one of nine Iranian female athletes

== Asian Games ==
In 2023, Javer claimed a silver medal in the women's double sculls of the 2022 Asian Games.
