= Nazanin Malaei =

Iranian rower (born 1992)

Personal information
- Nationality: Iran
- Born: 28 January 1992 (age 34) Sirjan, Iran
- Home town: Bandar-e Anzali, Iran
- Height: 1.71 m (5 ft 7 in)
- Weight: 61 kg (134 lb)
- Website: Official Instagram Profile

Sport
- Sport: Rowing
Medal record
Women's rowing
Representing Iran
Asian Games
Silver medal – second place	2018 Jakarta–Palembang	LW1x
Silver medal – second place	2022 Hangzhou	W4x
Bronze medal – third place	2014 Incheon	LW4x
Asian Championships
Gold medal – first place	2016 Jiashan	LW1X
Gold medal – first place	2017 Pattaya	LW1X
Gold medal – first place	2019 Chungju	LW1X
Gold medal – first place	2022 Ban Chang	W1X
Gold medal – first place	2022 Ban Chang	W2X
Gold medal – first place	2022 Ban Chang	LW1X
Silver medal – second place	2013 Lu'an	LW4X
Silver medal – second place	2015 Beijing	LW1X
Bronze medal – third place	2015 Beijing	W2X
Bronze medal – third place	2016 Jiashan	W4−

Nazanin Malaei (Persian: نازنین ملایی, born 28 January 1992) is an Iranian rower. She competed in the 2020 Summer Olympics.
