= Lok Kwan Hoi =

Hong Kong rower (born 1987)

Lok Kwan Hoi MH
Sport
- Country: Hong Kong
- Sport: Rowing
Medal record
Men's Rowing
Representing Hong Kong
Asian Games
Gold medal – first place	2014 Incheon	Men's lightweight single sculls
- Updated on 10 October 2014

Lok Kwan Hoi MH (Chinese: 駱坤海, 15 April 1987, Chaozhou) is a Hong Kong rower. He won the gold medal in the Men's lightweight single sculls at the 2014 Asian Games. He also compete in the men's lightweight double sculls at the 2012 Summer Olympics with Leung Chun Shek.
