= Rowing at the 2018 Asian Games – Women's lightweight single sculls =

Women's lightweight single sculls at the 2018 Asian Games
- Venue: Jakabaring Lake
- Date: 20–24 August 2018
- Competitors: 6 from 6 nations

Medalists
gold medal	Pan Dandan	China
silver medal	Nazanin Malaei	Iran
bronze medal	Lee Ka Man	Hong Kong

The women's lightweight single sculls competition at the 2018 Asian Games in Palembang, Indonesia was held from 20 August to 24 August at the JSC Lake.

== Schedule ==
All times are Western Indonesia Time (UTC+07:00)

Date	Time	Event
Monday, 20 August 2018	09:20	Preliminary race
Friday, 24 August 2018	09:35	Final

== Results ==
=== Preliminary race ===
- Qualification: 1–6 → Final (FA)

Rank	Athlete	Time	Notes
1	Pan Dandan (CHN)	8:09.07	FA
2	Nazanin Malaei (IRI)	8:30.49	FA
3	Lee Ka Man (HKG)	8:35.36	FA
4	Alina Mochula (KAZ)	8:48.09	FA
5	Nguyễn Thị Giang (VIE)	8:53.28	FA
6	Irin Neegree (THA)	8:57.26	FA

=== Final ===
Rank	Athlete	Time
1st place, gold medalist(s)	Pan Dandan (CHN)	8:05.79
2nd place, silver medalist(s)	Nazanin Malaei (IRI)	8:19.28
3rd place, bronze medalist(s)	Lee Ka Man (HKG)	8:27.21
4	Alina Mochula (KAZ)	8:39.12
5	Nguyễn Thị Giang (VIE)	8:43.53
6	Irin Neegree (THA)	8:59.30
