= Yan Shimin =

Chinese rower

Medal record

Women's rowing

Representing China

World Rowing Championships
Gold medal – first place	2006 Eton	LW2x
Bronze medal – third place	2007 Munich	LW4x
Bronze medal – third place	2010 Karapiro	LW4x

Yan Shimin (Chinese: 严诗敏; born 24 August 1987 in Zhejiang) is a Chinese rower.
