= Rowing at the 2018 Asian Games – Men's lightweight single sculls =

Men's lightweight single sculls at the 2018 Asian Games
- Venue: Jakabaring Lake
- Date: 20–24 August 2018
- Competitors: 12 from 12 nations

Medalists
gold medal	Park Hyun-su	South Korea
silver medal	Chiu Hin Chun	Hong Kong
bronze medal	Dushyant Chauhan	India

The men's lightweight single sculls competition at the 2018 Asian Games in Palembang, Indonesia was held from 20 August to 24 August at the JSC Lake.

== Schedule ==
All times are Western Indonesia Time (UTC+07:00)

Date	Time	Event
Monday, 20 August 2018	09:00	Heats
Wednesday, 22 August 2018	10:00	Repechages
Friday, 24 August 2018	09:00	Finals

== Results ==
Legend

- EXC — Excluded

=== Heats ===
- Qualification: 1 → Final A (FA), 2–6 → Repechages (R)

==== Heat 1 ====
Rank	Athlete	Time	Notes
1	Dushyant Chauhan (IND)	7:43.08	FA
2	Mohsen Shadi (IRI)	7:54.98	R
3	Ivan Exuzidi (KAZ)	7:58.91	R
4	Amirul Norhadi (MAS)	8:00.89	R
5	Denri Maulidzar Al-Ghiffari (INA)	8:13.85	R
6	Aminul Islam Methu (BAN)	10:49.91	R

==== Heat 2 ====
Rank	Athlete	Time	Notes
1	Park Hyun-su (KOR)	7:22.08	FA
2	Chiu Hin Chun (HKG)	7:27.24	R
3	Shakhboz Kholmurzaev (UZB)	7:36.73	R
4	Mohammed Riyadh (IRQ)	7:44.80	R
5	Asim Ejaz (PAK)	8:16.09	R
6	Hamad Al-Matrooshi (UAE)	8:17.19	R

=== Repechages ===
- Qualification: 1–2 → Final A (FA), 3–5 → Final B (FB)

==== Repechage 1 ====
Rank	Athlete	Time	Notes
1	Shakhboz Kholmurzaev (UZB)	7:50.21	FA
2	Mohsen Shadi (IRI)	7:59.15	FA
3	Amirul Norhadi (MAS)	8:35.13	FB
4	Asim Ejaz (PAK)	8:53.48	FB
5	Aminul Islam Methu (BAN)	11:29.82	FB

==== Repechage 2 ====
Rank	Athlete	Time	Notes
1	Chiu Hin Chun (HKG)	8:06.56	FA
2	Mohammed Riyadh (IRQ)	8:16.14	FA
3	Ivan Exuzidi (KAZ)	8:19.22	FB
4	Denri Maulidzar Al-Ghiffari (INA)	8:21.46	FB
5	Hamad Al-Matrooshi (UAE)	8:35.39	FB

=== Finals ===
==== Final B ====
Rank	Athlete	Time
1	Denri Maulidzar Al-Ghiffari (INA)	7:43.40
2	Amirul Norhadi (MAS)	7:45.35
3	Ivan Exuzidi (KAZ)	7:47.94
4	Hamad Al-Matrooshi (UAE)	8:06.51
5	Aminul Islam Methu (BAN)	10:01.28
—	Asim Ejaz (PAK)	EXC

==== Final A ====
Rank	Athlete	Time
1st place, gold medalist(s)	Park Hyun-su (KOR)	7:12.86
2nd place, silver medalist(s)	Chiu Hin Chun (HKG)	7:14.16
3rd place, bronze medalist(s)	Dushyant Chauhan (IND)	7:18.76
4	Shakhboz Kholmurzaev (UZB)	7:22.43
5	Mohsen Shadi (IRI)	7:22.86
6	Mohammed Riyadh (IRQ)	7:31.40
