= Nawamin Deenoi =

Thai rower

Personal information
- Nationality: Thailand
- Born: 30 January 1999 (age 27)

Sport
- Sport: Rowing
Medal record
Rowing
Representing Thailand
Asian Championships
| Bronze medal – third place | 2021 Ban Chang | Lightweight double sculls |

Nawamin Deenoi (born 30 January 1999) is a Thai rower. He competed in the 2020 Summer Olympics.
