= Wang Xinnan =

Chinese rower

Personal information
- Born: 12 July 1989 (age 36)
Medal record
Women's rowing
Representing China
World Rowing Championships
Bronze medal – third place	2010 Karapiro	LW4x
Asian Games
Gold medal – first place	2010 Guangzhou	LW4x

Xinnan Wang (Chinese: 王鑫楠; born 12 July 1989) is a Chinese rower.
