= Guo Kang =

Chinese rower

Guo Kang (born 14 February 1988) is a male Chinese rower, who competed for Team China at the 2008 Summer Olympics.
