= Dushyant Chauhan =

Indian rower (born 1993)

Dushyant Singh Chauhan
Personal information
- Born: 9 October 1998 (age 27)
- Height: 183 cm (6 ft 0 in)
- Weight: 82Kgs
- Military career
- Allegiance: India
- Branch: Army

Sport
- Country: India
- Sport: Rowing
Medal record
Men's Rowing
Representing India
World Rowing Regatta
Silver medal – second place	2014 Italy	2014 World Rowing Regatta - Lightweight single Sculls
Asian Rowing Championships
Gold medal – first place	2015 Thailand	Lightweight single sculls
Bronze medal – third place	2015 Beijing	Lightweight single sculls
Asian Games
Bronze medal – third place	2014 Incheon	Men's lightweight single sculls
Bronze medal – third place	2018 Jakarta	Men's lightweight single sculls

Dushyant Singh Chauhan is an Indian rower and an Indian Army Junior commission officer from the village of Kulana Jhajjar Haryana. He born in Delhi and primarily competes in single scull events. In 2014 he won bronze at the Asian games won the bronze medal in the Men's lightweight single sculls at the 2014 Asian Games, Incheon and the 2018 Asian Games, Jakarta. He is supported by the GoSports Foundation.

== Achievements ==
=== Asian Rowing Championships ===
Year	Venue	Event	Total	Result
2015	Beijing	2 km single sculls	7:03	Bronze

=== Asian Games ===
Year	Venue	Event	Total	Result
2018	Jakarta	2 km single sculls	7:09	Bronze
