= Jaruwat Saensuk =

Thai rower

Personal information
- Nationality: Thai
- Born: 21 May 1996 (age 30)

Sport
- Sport: Rowing
Medal record
Men's rowing
Representing Thailand
Asian Games
Bronze medal – third place	2018 Jakarta-Palembang	Double sculls
Bronze medal – third place	2018 Jakarta-Palembang	Quadruple sculls

Jaruwat Saensuk (born 21 May 1996) is a Thai competitive rower.

He competed at the 2016 Summer Olympics in Rio de Janeiro, in the men's single sculls.
