= Liu Tingting (rower) =

Chinese rower

Medal record

Women's rowing

Representing China

World Rowing Championships
Bronze medal – third place	2010 Karapiro	LW4x

Asian Games
Gold medal – first place	2010 Guangzhou	LW4x

Liu Tingting (Chinese: 刘婷婷; born 8 September 1990) is a Chinese rower.
