= Phạm Thị Hài =

Vietnamese rower (born 1989)

Medal record

Representing Vietnam

Women's Rowing

Asian Games
Silver medal – second place	2010 Guangzhou	Lightweight quadruple sculls
Silver medal – second place	2014 Incheon	Lightweight quadruple sculls
Bronze medal – third place	2014 Incheon	Quadruple sculls

Southeast Asian Games
Silver medal – second place	2013 Naypyidaw	Double sculls
Silver medal – second place	2013 Naypyidaw	Lightweight coxless four

Phạm Thị Hài (born 25 June 1989, Hanoi) is a Vietnamese rower. She has competed in 2012 Summer Olympics in the women's lightweight double sculls with Pham Thi Thao. They were the first Vietnamese rowing team ever to qualify for the Olympic Games.
