= Dattu Bhokanal =

Indian rower (born 1991)

Dattu Baban Bhokanal
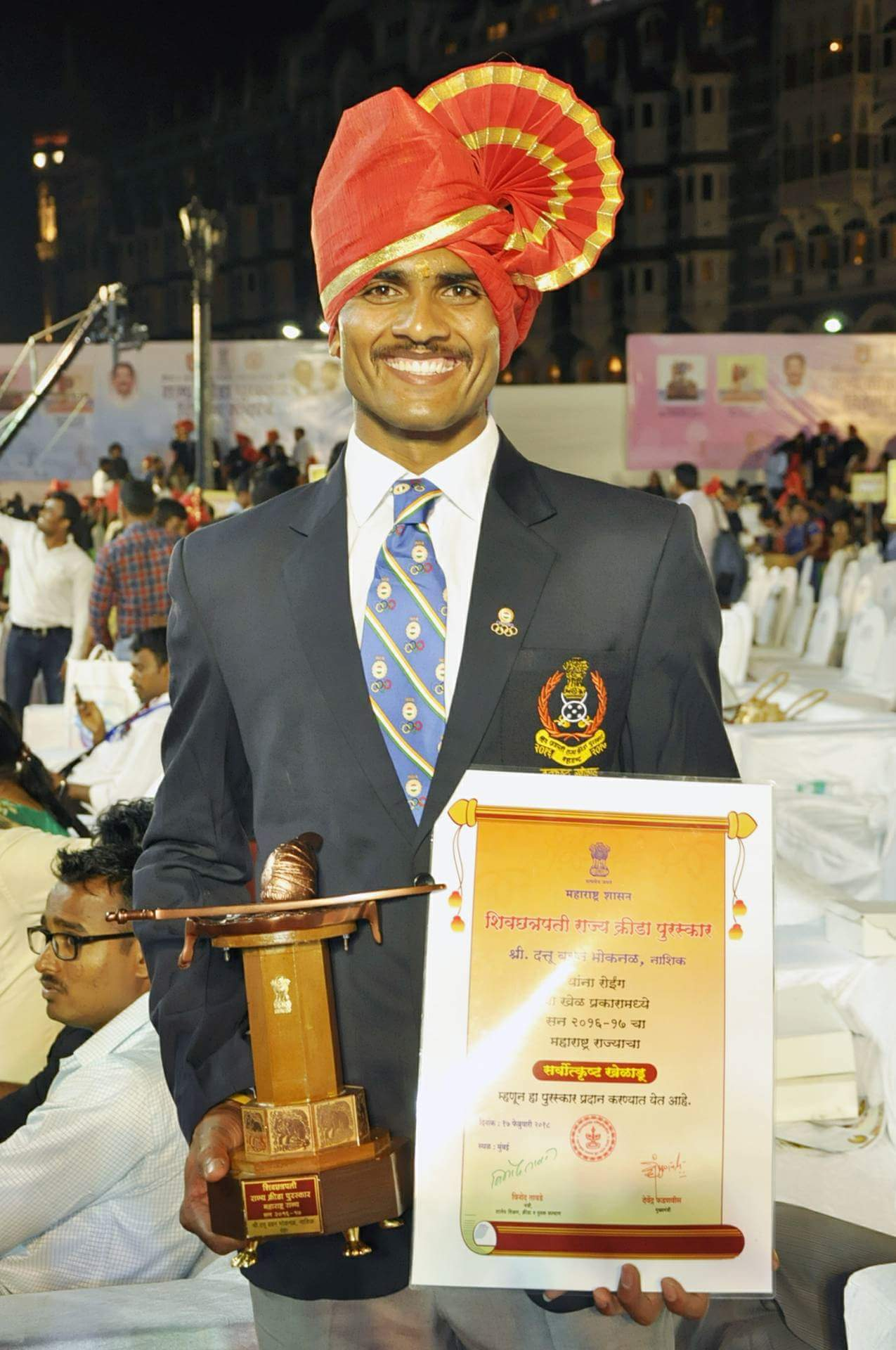
- Dattu Bhokanal with Shiv Chhatrapati Award by Government of Maharashtra

Personal information
- Born: 5 April 1991 (age 35) Talegaon Rohi Tal: Chandwad, Dist: Nashik, Maharastra, India
- Height: 6 ft 2 in (188 cm)
- Weight: 179 lb (81 kg)
- Military career
- Allegiance: India
- Branch: Indian Army
- Rank: Naib Subedar

Sport
- Country: India
- Sport: Rowing

Achievements and titles
- Highest world ranking: World's 13th Rank
Medal record
Representing India
Men's Rowing
Event	1st	2nd	3rd
Senior National Championship	4	-	-
Asian Rowing Championship	-	1	-
FISA Asia Oceania Olympic Qualifier	-	1	-
Americal National Championship	1	-	-
Indoor National Championship	1	-	-
Asian Games	1	-	-
Total	7	2	0
Senior National Championship
Gold medal – first place	2014 Pune	Men's Single Sculls
Gold medal – first place	2014 Pune	Men's Single Sculls
Gold medal – first place	2017 Pune	Men's Single Sculls
Gold medal – first place	2017 Pune	Men's Single Sculls
Asian Rowing Championship
Silver medal – second place	2015 Beijing	Men's Single Sculls
FISA Asia Oceania Olympic Qualifier
Silver medal – second place	2016 Chungju	Men's Single Sculls
American National Championship
Gold medal – first place	2016 Cincinnati	Men's Single Sculls
Indoor National Championship
Gold medal – first place	2017 Pune	Men's Single Sculls
Asian Games
Gold medal – first place	2018 Jakarta	Men's Quadruple sculls

Dattu Bhokanal is an Indian rower and an Indian Army Junior Commissioned Officer (JCO) who was qualified for the 2016 Rio Summer Olympics. He was qualified for the Olympics after winning a silver medal in the men's single sculls event at the FISA Asian and Oceania Olympic Qualification Regatta at Chung-Ju, South Korea where he clocked 7 minutes and 07.63 seconds. He is the only Indian rower to qualify for the Rio Olympics and is only the ninth rower to represent India in the Olympics. He won the gold medal in the 2018 Asian Games in Men's Quadruple sculls.

== Biography ==
Dattu was born in 1991.

Dattu's family could hardly meet both the ends with parents' meager earning as daily wage laborers. Hence, he dropped off the school in 2007 to do all kinds of odd jobs such as masonry, waiter in the wedding parties, helper on the farms, as a driver on tractors, earth movers, and other transportation vehicles. He started helping his father in well-digging work since 5th grade and in fact, that hard work helped him to build his stamina and strong arms required in rowing. At some point of time Dattu had also decided to become a well-digger. He used to work at a petrol pump at night and on the farm in the day time to support his family. He went back to school in 2010 to complete his 10th grade. However, he could not continue his education because of untimely death of his father in 2011. Dattu's father died due to bone cancer. After demise of his father, being the eldest in the family he needed a permanent job to support his family. In 2012, Dattu cleared all physical tests at the Indian Army's open recruitment drive in Beed district and got selected in the Indian Army as Havaldar.

Shortly before his planned departure for FISA Asia Oceania Olympic Qualifier in South Korea in 2016, his mother suffered brain damage in a fall resulting in almost total amnesia which ultimately resulted in her death. Dattu was the sole rower representing India in 2016 Rio Olympic games.

Today Dattu is India's one of the top rowers. But ironically he grew up in a region where scarcity of water and dry drought is a normal phenomenon. In fact, in his childhood Dattu was terrified of waterbodies which he confessed in his interview with Virender Sehwag. Dattu has been named in the Forbes 30-under-30 list in 2017. Dr. Santosh Khedalekar wrote the biography of Dattu in Marathi "Dattu-The Rowing Man".

== Rowing career ==
He started rowing in 2012 at the Bombay Engineer Group & Centre (Khadki) Centre in Pune. In 2013, he shifted to Army Rowing Node (ARN), Pune for better training. His first coach was Kudrat Ali. Now he is being trained under Dronacharya Awardee and chief National rowing coach Ismail Baig at the ARN, Pune.

Dattu was the lone Indian rower to be qualified after winning a silver medal in the men's single sculls event at the FISA Asian and Oceania Olympic qualification regatta held at Chung-Ju in South Korea in 2016. He clocked 7 Minutes and 7.63 Seconds to complete the 2 km course to finish second.

In Rio Olympics 2016, Dattu secured 13th position by clocking 6 minutes and 54.96 seconds. In the same year, Dattu won gold medal at American National Championship at Cincinnati, Ohio, USA. Dattu Bhokanal won gold medal in quadruple sculls at Asian Games Jakarta-Palembang 2018 with timing 6 Minutes and 17.13 Seconds.

Dattu has been awarded Arjuna Award by the Government of India in 2020 for his achievements in the sport of rowing.

== Achievements ==
=== Senior National Championship ===
Year	Venue	Competition	Time	Result	Won
2014	Pune	Men's Single Sculls	7:26 min	Gold	2
2017	Pune	Men's Single Sculls		Gold	2

=== Asian Games ===
Year	Venue	Competition	Time	Result
2014	Incheon	Men's Double Sculls	6:47 min	5th

=== Asian Rowing Championship ===
Year	Venue	Competition	Time	Result	Won
2015	Beijing	Men's Single Sculls	7:18 min	Silver	1

=== FISA Asia Oceania Olympic Qualifier ===
Year	Venue	Competition	Time	Result	Won
2016	Chungju	Men's Single Sculls	7:07 min	Silver	1

=== American National Championship ===
Year	Venue	Competition	Time	Result	Won
2016	Cincinnati	Men's Single Sculls	7:04 min	Gold	1

=== Rio Olympics ===
Year	Venue	Competition	Time	Result	Won
2016	Rio de Janeiro	Men's Single Sculls	6:54.96 min	13th	

=== Indoor National Championship ===
Year	Venune	Competition	Time	Result	Won
2017	Pune	Men's Single Sculls	6:32 min	Gold	1

=== Asian Games ===
Year	Venue	Competition	Time	Result	Won
2018	Jakarta	Men's Quadruple Sculls	6:17 min	Gold	1
2018	Jakarta	Men's Single Sculls	7:47 min	5th	

== Awards ==
Year	Award	Awarded By
2016	Best Player & Rising Star	Rowing Federation of India
2017	Honored in the 30 Under 30 list	Forbes Magazine
2017	Times of India Best Player	Times of India Group
2017	Shiv Chhatrapati Award	Government of Maharashtra
2020	Arjuna Award	Government of India
