= Target Olympic Podium Scheme =

Indian initiative to promote sports

Target Olympic Podium Scheme (TOPS) is a scheme created by Government of India to promote sports in India. In September 2014, the Ministry of Youth Affairs and Sports, Government of India started a scheme to train and promote high-performance athletes with a target of getting medals at the 2016 Rio and 2020 Tokyo Olympic Games. It constituted a committee called as TOPS Elite Athletes’ Identification Committee to identify the elite athletes who can be supported in their training to get the Olympic medals. TOPS was expanded to include junior athletes in 2020.

TOPS, along with other nationwide sports initiatives such as Khelo India, have been recognized as improving India's performance at major sporting events.

== See also ==
- Fit India Movement
