= Park Hyun-su =

South Korean rower (born 1995)

Personal information
- Born: 29 December 1995 (age 30)

Sport
- Country: South Korea
- Sport: Rowing
Medal record
Men's rowing
Representing South Korea
Asian Games
Gold medal – first place	2018 Jakarta	Lwt single sculls
Bronze medal – third place	2026 Aichi–Nagoya	Lwt single sculls

Park Hyun-su (born 29 December 1995) is a South Korean rower. In 2018, he won the gold medal in the men's lightweight single sculls event at the Asian Games held in Indonesia.

He also competed at the World Rowing Championships in 2017 and in 2019.
