= Hồ Thị Lý =

Vietnamese rower (born 1991)

Personal information
- Nationality: Vietnamese
- Born: 22 February 1991 (age 35)

Sport
- Sport: Rowing
Medal record
Women's rowing
Representing Vietnam
Asian Games
Gold medal – first place	2018 Jakarta–Palembang	Lwt quadruple sculls
Bronze medal – third place	2022 Hangzhou	Eight

Hồ Thị Lý (born February 22, 1991, in Đông Hà, Quảng Trị Province) is a Vietnamese rower. She and Tạ Thanh Huyền placed 18th in the women's lightweight double sculls event at the 2016 Summer Olympics.
