= Chiu Hin Chun =

Hong Kong rower (born 1994)

Chiu Hin Chun OLY
Personal information
- Nationality: Hong Konger
- Born: 20 August 1994 (age 32)
- Website: Instagram: hinchun_chc Facebook:HinChun Chiu

Sport
- Sport: Rowing
Medal record
Asian Games
Gold medal – first place	2026 Aichi–Nagoya	Lwt single sculls
Silver medal – second place	2018 Jakarta–Palembang	Lwt single sculls
Bronze medal – third place	2022 Hangzhou	Single sculls

Chiu Hin Chun (born 20 August 1994) is a Hong Kong competitive rower.

He qualified to the 2016 Summer Olympics in Rio de Janeiro, and was selected to represent Hong Kong in the men's lightweight double sculls, together with Tang Chiu Mang.
