= Ban Chang (town) =

Ban Chang บ้านฉาง
- Town Municipality
- Location in Thailand
- Coordinates: 12°43′15″N 101°4′1″E
- Country: Thailand
- Province: Rayong
- District: Ban Chang
- Founded: 1962
- Town Municipality: 2005

Population (2019)
  - Total: 30,983
- Time zone: UTC+7 (ICT)
- Area code: (+66) 38

Ban Chang (Thai: บ้านฉาง) is a town (Thesaban Mueang) located in the Ban Chang District (Amphoe) of Rayong Province of Eastern Thailand. In 2019, it had a total population of 30,983 people.
