= Tang Chiu Mang =

Hong Kong rower (born 1990)

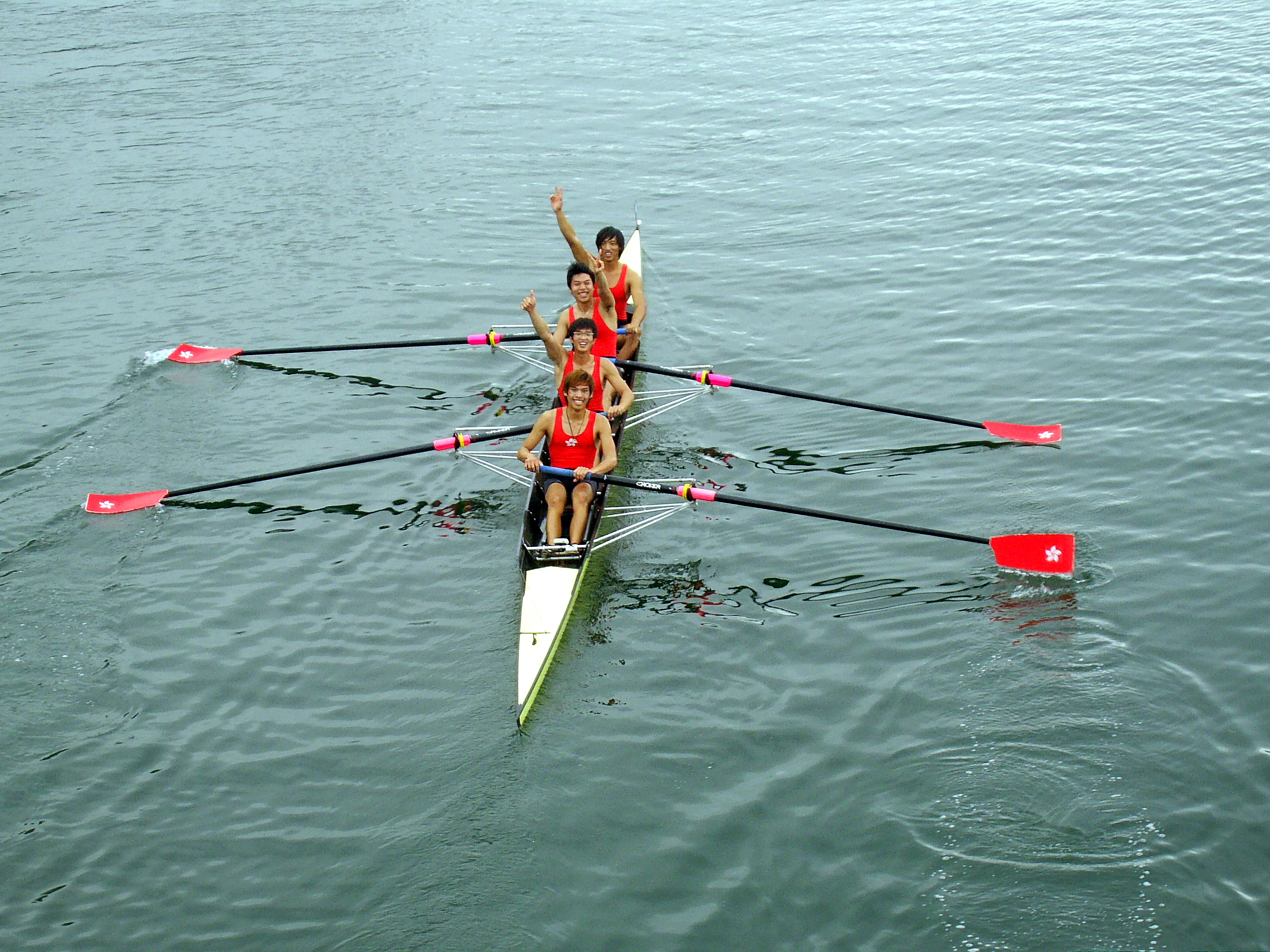

Personal information
- Nationality: Hong Konger
- Born: 24 July 1990 (age 35)

Sport
- Sport: Rowing

Tang Chiu Mang (born 24 July 1990) is a Hong Kong competitive rower.

He qualified to the 2016 Summer Olympics in Rio de Janeiro, and was selected to represent Hong Kong in the men's lightweight double sculls, together with Chiu Hin Chun. He placed 19th in the Rowing Lightweight Men's Double Sculls event.
