= Shekhroz Hakimov =

Uzbek rower

Personal information
- Born: 8 October 1992 (age 33)
- Height: 178 cm (5 ft 10 in)
- Weight: 69 kg (152 lb)
Medal record
Men's rowing
Representing Uzbekistan
Asian Games
Gold medal – first place	2022 Hangzhou	Coxless four
Silver medal – second place	2018 Jakarta Palembang	Lwt eight
Silver medal – second place	2022 Hangzhou	Coxless pair
Bronze medal – third place	2018 Jakarta Palembang	Lwt coxless four

Shekhroz Hakimov (also spelled Shehroz Hakimov, born 8 October 1992) is an Uzbek rower.

== Career ==
He is a four-time Asian Games medalist.
