= Tangeum Lake =

Lake in Chungju, South Korea

Coordinates: 37.0219°N 127.8652°E

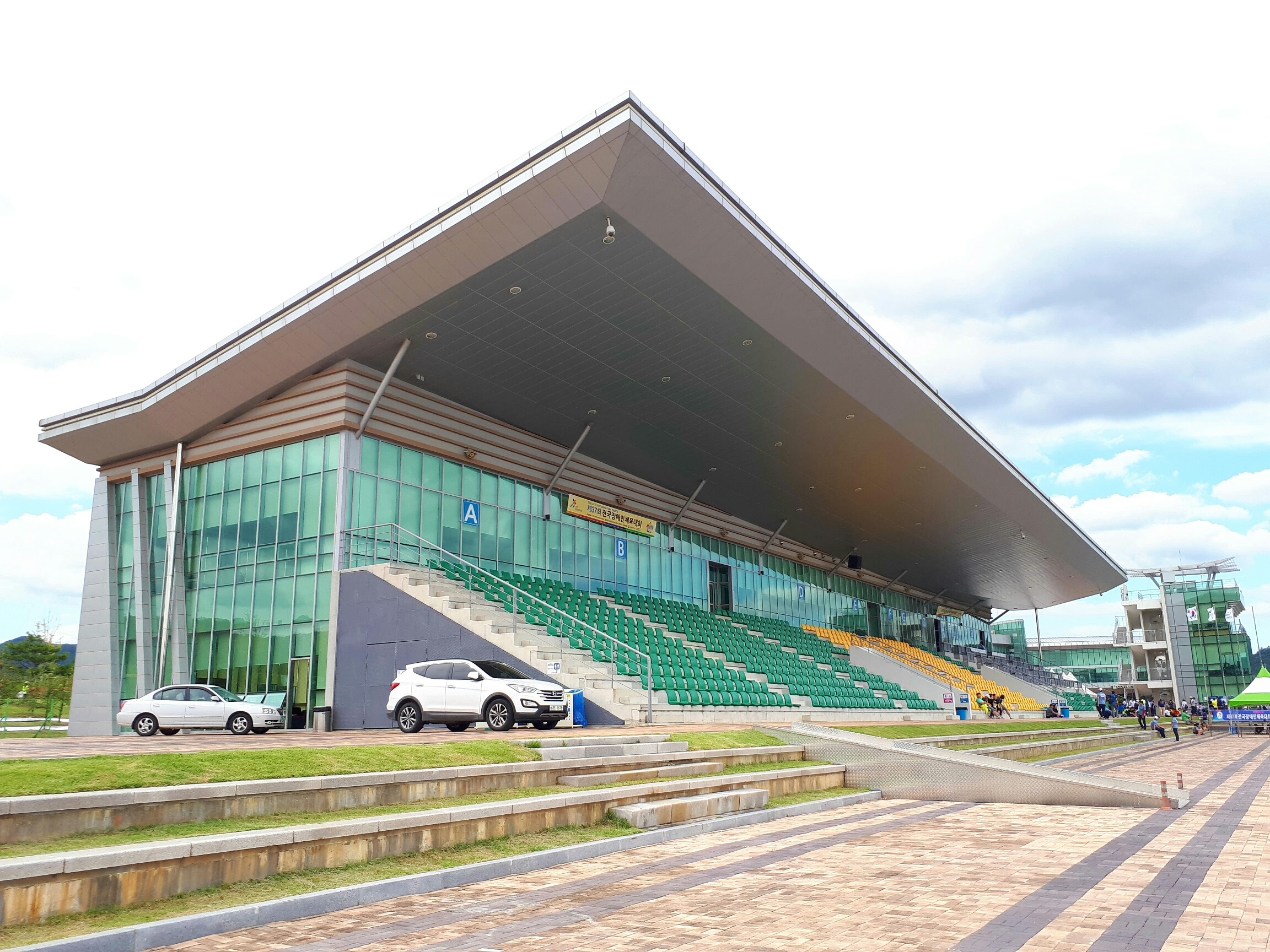
Tangeum Lake International Rowing Center

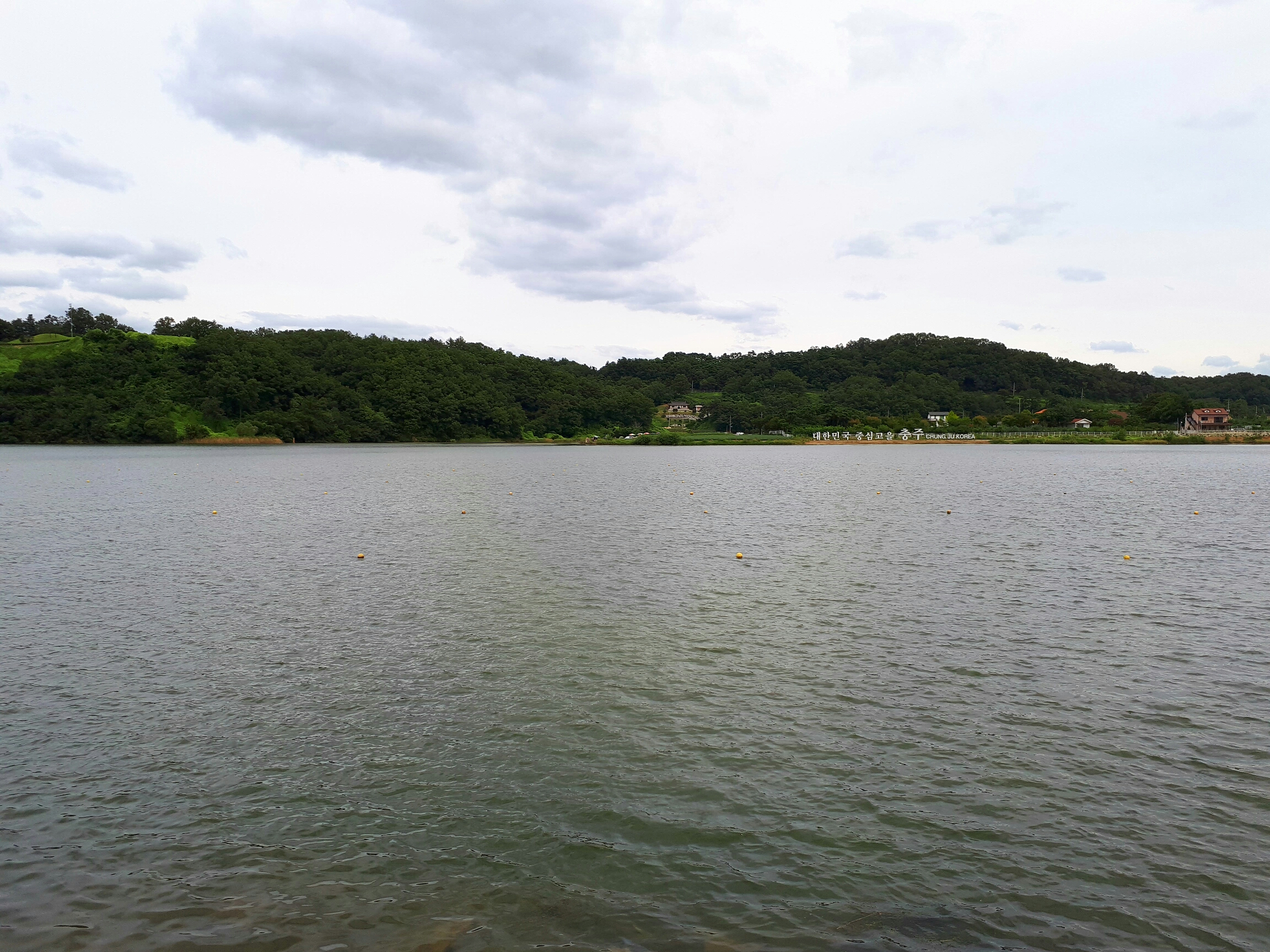
Tangeum Lake

Tangeum Lake (Korean: 탄금호) is an artificial lake at Chungju in South Korea.

The lake is located between Chungju Dam and another dam that regulates its flow. There are leisure facilities including Jungangtap Park and Keum Sports Park. The lake is surrounded by roads with good views. Each August there are water sports and cultural performances at the Riverside Stage near the lake. The River Fountain is located next to the Riverside Stage. There are also facilities for people to do bird watching.

The lake was the location for the 2013 World Rowing Championships between August 25 – September 1, 2013. It was also hosted 2019 Asian Rowing Championships between October 23 – 27, 2019.

== See also ==
- Chungju Lake
