= Phuttharaksa Neegree =

Thai rower (born 1974)

Phuttharaksa "Pat" Neegree (Thai: พุทธรักษา นีกรี โรเดนเบิร์ก; born 25 February 1974 in Mae Hong Son Province) is a Thai rower. She competed in the single sculls race at the 2012 Summer Olympics and placed 5th in Final C and 17th overall.
