= Asian Rowing Championships =

Continental rowing championships of Asia

The Asian Rowing Championships is a rowing championship organised by the Asian Rowing Federation for competitors from the Asian countries.

== List tournaments ==
| # | Year | Venue | Date |
|---|---|---|---|
| 1 | 1985 | Sha Tin, Hong Kong | |
| 2 | 1987 | Shanghai, China | |
| 3 | 1989 | Chandigarh, India | |
| 4 | 1991 | Tokyo, Japan | |
| 5 | 1993 | South Korea | |
| 6 | 1995 | China | |
| 7 | 1997 | Taiwan | |
| 8 | 1999 | Naganuma, Japan | October 14–16, 1999 |
| 9 | 2001 | Xi'an, China | September 23–27, 2001 |
| 10 | 2003 | Guangzhou, China | September 25–28, 2003 |
| 11 | 2005 | Hyderabad, India | October 20–23, 2005 |
| 12 | 2007 | Chungju, South Korea | October 16–19, 2007 |
| 13 | 2009 | Yilan, Taiwan | November 4–8, 2009 |
| 14 | 2011 | Hwacheon, South Korea | October 13–17, 2011 |
| 15 | 2013 | Lu'an, China | September 25–29, 2013 |
| 16 | 2015 | Beijing, China | September 24–28, 2015 |
| 17 | 2016 | Jiashan, China | September 9–13, 2016 |
| 18 | 2017 | Pattaya, Thailand | September 4–8, 2017 |
| 19 | 2019 | Chungju, South Korea | October 23–27, 2019 |
| 20 | 2021 | Ban Chang, Thailand | December 9–12, 2021 |
| 21 | 2022 | Ban Chang, Thailand | Nov 30 – Dec 4, 2022 |
| 22 | 2024 | Samarkand, Uzbekistan | October 10–13, 2024 |
| 23 | 2025 | Haiphong, Vietnam | October 16–19, 2025 |
