= Rowing at the 2026 Asian Games =

- Venue: Nagaragawa International Regatta Course
- Dates: 23–24 September 2026
- Competitors: 217 from 19 nations

Rowing at the 2026 Asian Games was held between 23 and 24 September 2026 at the Nagaragawa International Regatta Course, Kaizu, Gifu Prefecture, Japan.

The competitions had to be rescheduled due to inclement weather. The races, originally planned to be held across four days, were completed in two days.

== Schedule ==
H	Heats	F	Finals

Event↓/Date →	23rd Wed	24th Thu
Men's single sculls	H	F
Men's double sculls	H	F
Men's quadruple sculls	H	F
Men's coxless pair	H	F
Men's coxless four	H	F
Men's lightweight single sculls	H	F
Men's lightweight double sculls	H	F
Women's single sculls	H	F
Women's double sculls	H	F
Women's quadruple sculls	H	F
Women's coxless pair	H	F
Women's coxless four	H	F
Women's lightweight single sculls	H	F
Women's lightweight double sculls	H	F

== Medalists ==
=== Men ===
Event	Gold	Silver	Bronze
Single sculls	Deng Zhiwei; China	Shakhboz Kholmurzaev; Uzbekistan	Tatsuya Sakurama; Japan
Double sculls	China; Yi Xudi; Nie Yide	Uzbekistan; Mekhrojbek Mamatkulov; Pavel Sorin	India; Satnam Singh; Salman Khan
Quadruple sculls	China; Mu Xiaolong; Zhang Xiuli; Xue Hao; Ou Zhiwei	Indonesia; Ihram; Rendi Setia Maulana; Febrian; La Memo	Uzbekistan; Shakhboz Kholmurzaev; Davrjon Davronov; Mekhrojbek Mamatkulov; Pavel Sorin
Coxless pair	Kazakhstan; Vladislav Yakovlev; Ivan Chernukhin	China; Cao Chuang; Yang Mengshuai	Uzbekistan; Maksim Golubev; Alisher Turdiev
Coxless four	China; Li Chun; Li Zepeng; Shao Zhiqiang; Bian Shihao	Uzbekistan; Fazliddin Karimov; Dilshodjon Khudoyberdiev; Maksim Golubev; Alisher Turdiev	Vietnam; Trần Dương Nghĩa; Thái Bảo Toàn; Hoàng Văn Đạt; Nguyễn Phú
Lightweight single sculls	Chiu Hin Chun; Hong Kong	Amir Hossein Mahmoudpour; Iran	Park Hyun-su; South Korea
Lightweight double sculls	Uzbekistan; Shakhzod Nurmatov; Sobirjon Safaroliev	Indonesia; Rafiq Wijdan Yasir; Ali Mardiansyah	Hong Kong; Lam San Tung; Chan Tik Lun

=== Women ===
Event	Gold	Silver	Bronze
Single sculls	Zhang Xinyu; China	Anna Prakaten; Uzbekistan	Fatemeh Mojallal; Iran
Double sculls	China; Wang Sixuan; Shen Shuangmei	Iran; Kimia Zareei; Zeinab Norouzi	Vietnam; Trần Thị Tú Uyên; Phạm Thị Bích Ngọc
Quadruple sculls	China; Xu Yixi; Li Yan; Han Mengyao; Jiao Siyu	Iran; Hengameh Kamyab; Soha Fakhri; Mahsa Javer; Saghi Maleki	Japan; Miho Ueno; Mao Kamidate; Hinako Ino; Mao Kadoya
Coxless pair	China; Ren Wanning; Zhu Hongshan	Uzbekistan; Anna Aksenova; Aydana Smetullaeva	Vietnam; Đinh Thị Hảo; Phạm Thị Huệ
Coxless four	China; Zhang Shuxian; Li Duolei; Zhang Yangjing; Liu Yaqi	Uzbekistan; Raykhona Sattorova; Mariya Sergeeva; Anna Aksenova; Aydana Smetullaeva	Vietnam; Phạm Thị Ngọc Anh; Lê Thị Hiền; Hà Thị Vui; Dư Thị Bông
Lightweight single sculls	Fatemeh Mojallal; Iran	Winne Hung; Hong Kong	Parisa Chaempudsa; Thailand
Lightweight double sculls	Iran; Kimia Zareei; Zeinab Norouzi	Hong Kong; Cheung Yuen Shan; Leung Wing Wun	Japan; Chika Yonezawa; Chiaki Tomita

== Medal table ==
Rank	Nation	Gold	Silver	Bronze	Total
1	China (CHN)	9	1	0	10
2	Iran (IRI)	2	3	1	6
3	Uzbekistan (UZB)	1	6	2	9
4	Hong Kong (HKG)	1	2	1	4
5	Kazakhstan (KAZ)	1	0	0	1
6	Indonesia (INA)	0	2	0	2
7	Vietnam (VIE)	0	0	4	4
8	Japan (JPN)	0	0	3	3
9	India (IND)	0	0	1	1
9	South Korea (KOR)	0	0	1	1
9	Thailand (THA)	0	0	1	1
Totals (11 entries)		14	14	14	42

== Participating nations ==
A total of 217 athletes from 19 nations competed in rowing at the 2026 Asian Games:

- China (26)
- Chinese Taipei (3)
- Hong Kong (19)
- India (20)
- Indonesia (15)
- Iran (11)
- Iraq (2)
- Japan (27)
- Kazakhstan (17)
- Lebanon (1)
- Malaysia (1)
- Pakistan (1)
- Palestine (2)
- Philippines (5)
- South Korea (16)
- Sri Lanka (2)
- Thailand (10)
- Uzbekistan (16)
- Vietnam (23)
