= 2025 Asian Rowing Championships =

- Host city: Haiphong, Vietnam
- Dates: 16–19 October 2025
- Main venue: Gia Dam River

The 2025 Asian Rowing Championships were the 23rd Asian Rowing Championships and took place from 16 to 19 October 2025, in Haiphong, Vietnam.

== Medal summary ==
=== Men ===
Event	Gold	Silver	Bronze
Single sculls	Balraj Panwar; India	Baker Shihab; Iraq	La Memo; Indonesia
Double sculls	Japan; Taisei Miyaguchi; Tatsuya Sakurama	India; Jaspinder Singh; Salman Khan	Iraq; Mohammed Riyadh; Baker Shihab
Quadruple sculls	India; Kulwinder Singh; Navdeep Singh; Satnam Singh; Jakar Khan	Uzbekistan; Boburjon Mukhiddinov; Jamal Turgunov; Mekhrojbek Mamatkulov; Shakhboz Kholmurzaev	Vietnam; Nguyễn Văn Hà; Bùi Văn Hoàn; Nguyễn Văn Hiếu; Nguyễn Hữu Thành
Coxless pair	Uzbekistan; Fazliddin Karimov; Dilshodjon Khudoyberdiev	Hong Kong; Wong Ching; Chan Chi Fung	Kazakhstan; Ivan Chernukhin; Vladislav Yakovlev
Eight	Uzbekistan; Shekhroz Hakimov; Shukhrat Shodiev; Obidjon Jurakulov; Shakhriyor Khamdamov; Fazliddin Karimov; Dilshodjon Khudoyberdiev; Davrjon Davronov; Alisher Turdiev; Farrukh Oblakulov	India; Nitin Deol; Parvinder Singh; Lakhveer Singh; Ravi; Gurpartap Singh; Bheem Singh; Jaswinder Singh; Kulbir; Kiran Singh Maimom	Vietnam; Dương Văn Kiên; Nguyễn Khánh Lập; Dương Hồng Thái; Phan Mạnh Linh; Hoàng Văn Đạt; Nguyễn Phú; Trần Dương Nghĩa; Võ Đình Phong; Nguyễn Lâm Kiều Diễm
Lightweight single sculls	Chiu Hin Chun; Hong Kong	Shakhzod Nurmatov; Uzbekistan	Artem Matussevich; Kazakhstan
Lightweight double sculls	India; Lakshay; Ajay Tyagi	Uzbekistan; Sobirjon Safaroliev; Ozod Mamatov	Iran; Amir Reza Ebdali; Amir Hossein Mahmoudpour
Lightweight quadruple sculls	Indonesia; Ali Mardiansyah; Ihram; Rafiq Wijdan Yasir; Ardi Isadi	India; Rohit; Ujjwal Kumar Singh; Lakshay; Ajay Tyagi	Uzbekistan; Firdavs Makhkamov; Ozod Mamatov; Shakhzod Nurmatov; Sobirjon Safaroliev
Lightweight coxless pair	Uzbekistan; Shakhriyor Khamdamov; Obidjon Jurakulov	Indonesia; Aprianto; Ferdiansyah	India; Nitin Deol; Parvinder Singh
Lightweight coxless four	Hong Kong; Chan Tik Lun; Chen Pak Hong; Lam San Tung; To Siu Po	India; Sannee Kumar; Iqbal Singh; Babu Lal Yadav; Yogesh Kumar	Uzbekistan; Shekhroz Hakimov; Muhammadali Jurakulov; Anvar Karimov; Daler Ashurov

=== Women ===
Event	Gold	Silver	Bronze
Single sculls	Fatemeh Mojallal; Iran	Wen Ching-yang; Chinese Taipei	Liu Jie; Hong Kong
Double sculls	Uzbekistan; Malika Tagmatova; Anna Prakaten	Vietnam; Nguyễn Thị Vân Anh; Phạm Thị Bích Ngọc	Iran; Mahsa Javer; Fatemeh Mojallal
Quadruple sculls	Vietnam; Trần Thị Tú Uyên; Nguyễn Thị Vân Anh; Bùi Thị Thu Hiền; Phạm Thị Bích Ngọc	Indonesia; Nurtang; Issa Behuku; Mutiara Rahma Putri; Chelsea Corputty	Thailand; Matinee Raruen; Jirakit Phuetthonglang; Rawiwan Sukkaew; Parisa Chaempudsa
Coxless pair	Vietnam; Đinh Thị Hảo; Phạm Thị Huệ	Uzbekistan; Raykhona Sattorova; Aydana Smetullaeva	Hong Kong; Wong Sheung Yee; Leung King Wan
Coxless four	Vietnam; Phạm Thị Ngọc Anh; Lê Thị Hiền; Hà Thị Vui; Dư Thị Bông	Indonesia; Nur Azizah Patwa; Andi Reski Rahmawati; Yunita Huby; Aisah Nabila	Thailand; Arisa Chaiya; Natticha Kaewhom; Matinee Raruen; Jirakit Phuetthonglang
Eight	Vietnam; Phạm Thị Ngọc Anh; Phạm Thị Thảo; Trần Thị Kiệt; Lê Thị Hiền; Hà Thị Vui; Đinh Thị Hảo; Phạm Thị Huệ; Dư Thị Bông; Lường Thị Thảo	Kazakhstan; Yekaterina Noskova; Valentina Volkodavova; Anastassiya Kulinich; Melani Zhakupova; Mariya Lebedeva; Tamara Pervushkina; Anzhela Polyanina; Varvara Belonogova; Medina Konurbayeva	India; Gurbani Kaur; Diljot Kaur; Suman Devi; Aleena Anto; Kiran; Poonam; Haobijam Tendenthoi Devi; Aswathi P. B. Kiran Singh Maimom
Lightweight single sculls	Winne Hung; Hong Kong	Zeinab Norouzi; Iran	Mariya Chernets; Kazakhstan
Lightweight double sculls	Iran; Kimia Zareei; Zeinab Norouzi	Indonesia; Mutiara Rahma Putri; Chelsea Corputty	Hong Kong; Leung Wing Wun; Claire Burley
Lightweight quadruple sculls	Vietnam; Lường Thị Thảo; Hồ Thị Duy; Nguyễn Thị Giang; Phạm Thị Thảo	Kazakhstan; Irina Chudina; Roza Kenges; Yekaterina Noskova; Mariya Chernets	Chinese Taipei; Yu Pei-fen; Wang Ming-xuan; Lin Chia-jung; Lin Hsuan-yun
Lightweight coxless pair	Vietnam; Hà Thị Vui; Dư Thị Bông	India; Gurbani Kaur; Diljot Kaur	North Korea; Ri Hye-jong; Ri So-yon

== Medal table ==
Rank	Nation	Gold	Silver	Bronze	Total
1	Vietnam	6	1	2	9
2	Uzbekistan	4	4	2	10
3	India	3	5	2	10
4	Hong Kong	3	1	3	7
5	Iran	2	1	2	5
6	Indonesia	1	4	1	6
7	Japan	1	0	0	1
8	Kazakhstan	0	2	3	5
9	Chinese Taipei	0	1	1	2
9	Iraq	0	1	1	2
11	Thailand	0	0	2	2
12	North Korea	0	0	1	1
Totals (12 entries)		20	20	20	60
