= Ashish (rower) =

Indian rower (born 1997)

Personal information
- Nationality: Indian
- Born: 10 February 1997 (age 29) Dayal Ka Nagal, Neem Ka Thana, Rajasthan
- Height: 188 cm (6 ft 2 in)
- Weight: 87 kg (192 lb)
- Military career
- Allegiance: India
- Branch: Indian Army
- Service years: 2016–present
- Rank: Subedar
- Service number: JC- 345254H
- Unit: 235 Engineer Regiment

Sport
- Country: India
- Sport: Rowing
Medal record
Representing India
Asian Games
Silver medal – second place	2022 Hangzhou	Eight
Bronze medal – third place	2022 Hangzhou	Coxless four
Asian Rowing Championships
Bronze medal – third place	2022 Rayong	Coxless four
National Games of India
Gold medal – first place	2022 Gujarat	Coxless four
Gold medal – first place	2023 Goa	Coxless four
National Championships of India
Gold medal – first place	2022 Pune	Coxless four
Gold medal – first place	2023 Pune	Coxless four
Gold medal – first place	2023 Pune	Eight
Gold medal – first place	2024 Pune	Coxless four
Silver medal – second place	2019 Hyderabad	Coxless pair
Open Sprint National Rowing Championships of India
Gold medal – first place	2022 Pune	Coxless four
Gold medal – first place	2023 Pune	Coxless pair
Gold medal – first place	2024 Pune	Coxless four
Silver medal – second place	2019 Hyderabad	Coxless pair
Indoor National Rowing Championships of India
Gold medal – first place	2019 Pondicherry	Open Men's Pair

Ashish (born 10 February 1997) is an Indian rower from Rajasthan. He was part of the Indian rowing team at the 2022 Asian Games, Hangzhou, China that won bronze. He competes in the men's coxless four and men's eight. He was part of the team that won the bronze medal in the men's coxless four and a silver in the men's eight at the Asian Games in Hangzhou, China.

The Indian team for men's eight, along with coxswain, consisted of Neeraj Maan, Naresh Kalwaniya, Neetish Kumar, Charanjeet Singh, Jaswinder Singh, Bheem Singh, Punit Kumar and Ashish. Dhananjay Pande was the coxswain of the team. Ashish takes the eighth row. All the Indian team members are from the Indian Army and have trained at the Army Rowing Node facility in Pune for over a year.

== Career ==
- 2023: He won a bronze (men's coxless four) and a silver medal (men's eight) at the 2022 Asian Games.
- 2023: He was part of the Indian team that came fourth in the Men's Four at the World Rowing Cup 1 in Croatia.
- 2023: He was also part of the Indian team that took part in World Cup 4 at Switzerland where India finished 12th in Men's four.
- 2022: In May, he was part of the Men's coxless fours in the Indian team that finished 9th at the World Cup in Belgrade, Serbia.
- 2022: He was part of the Indian Men's eight at the World Cup in Poland where India finished 5th.
- 2022: He won a bronze medal as part of the Indian Men's four at the Asian Rowing Championships in Thailand.

== Domestic career ==
- 2023: He won two gold medals at the 40th Senior National Rowing Championship, Pune.
- 2023: He won a gold medal in the 500m M2- at the 24th Open Sprint National Rowing Championship, Pune.
- 2022: He won a gold at the 39th Senior National Rowing Championship, Pune.
- 2022: He won a gold at the 23rd Open Sprint National Rowing Championship, Pune.
- 2019: He got a gold medal at the 3rd Indoor National Rowing Championships at Pondicherry.
- 2019: He won a silver medal In the 38th Senior National Rowing Championships at Hyderabad.
- 2019: He won a silver at the 22nd Open Sprint National Rowing Championship, Hyderabad.

Dates of rank

Insignia	Rank	Component	Date of rank
	Hawaldar	Indian Army	Aug 2023
	Subedar	Indian Army	12/ Feb/2024
