= Rowing at the 2022 Asian Games =

2022 Asian Games competition

- Venue: Fuyang Water Sports Centre
- Dates: 20–25 September 2023
- Competitors: 251 from 21 nations

Rowing at the 2022 Asian Games was held at the Fuyang Water Sports Centre, Hangzhou, China from 20 to 25 September 2023.

== Schedule ==
H	Heats	R	Repechages	S	Semifinals	F	Finals

Event↓/Date →	20th Wed	21st Thu	22nd Fri	23rd Sat	24th Sun	25th Mon
Men's single sculls	H	R	S			F
Men's double sculls	H	R			F	
Men's quadruple sculls	H	R				F
Men's coxless pair	H				F	
Men's coxless four	H	R				F
Men's eight	H				F	
Men's lightweight double sculls	H	R			F	
Women's single sculls	H	R	S			F
Women's double sculls	H	R			F	
Women's quadruple sculls	H					F
Women's coxless pair	H					F
Women's coxless four	H				F	
Women's eight	H					F
Women's lightweight double sculls	H	R			F	

== Medalists ==
=== Men ===
Event	Gold	Silver	Bronze
Single sculls	Zhang Liang; China	Ryuta Arakawa; Japan	Chiu Hin Chun; Hong Kong
Double sculls	China; Liu Zhiyu; Zhang Liang	Uzbekistan; Shakhboz Kholmurzaev; Mekhrojbek Mamatkulov	Indonesia; Ihram; La Memo
Quadruple sculls	China; Han Wei; Yi Xudi; Zang Ha; Adilijiang Sulitan	Uzbekistan; Shakhzod Nurmatov; Shakhboz Kholmurzaev; Mekhrojbek Mamatkulov; Sobirjon Safaroliev	India; Satnam Singh; Parminder Singh; Jakar Khan; Sukhmeet Singh
Coxless pair	Hong Kong; Lam San Tung; Wong Wai Chun	Uzbekistan; Shekhroz Hakimov; Dilshodjon Khudoyberdiev	India; Babu Lal Yadav; Lekh Ram
Coxless four	Uzbekistan; Shekhroz Hakimov; Dilshodjon Khudoyberdiev; Davrjon Davronov; Alisher Turdiev	China; Li Wenlei; Chen Xianfeng; Xu Qiao; Cai Pengpeng	India; Jaswinder Singh; Bheem Singh; Punit Kumar; Ashish
Eight	China; Li Wenlei; Chen Xianfeng; Xu Qiao; Lü Li; Ji Gaoxing; Cai Pengpeng; Ni Xulin; Nie Yide; Liang Weixiong	India; Neeraj; Naresh Kalwaniya; Neetish Kumar; Charanjeet Singh; Jaswinder Singh; Bheem Singh; Punit Kumar; Ashish; Dhananjay Pande	Indonesia; Rifqi Harits Taufiqurahman; Kakan Kusmana; Sulpianto; Rendi Setia Maulana; Asuhan Pattiha; Ferdiansyah; Denri Maulidzar Al-Ghiffari; Ardi Isadi; Ujang Hasbulloh
Lightweight double sculls	China; Fan Junjie; Sun Man	India; Arjun Lal Jat; Arvind Singh	Uzbekistan; Shakhzod Nurmatov; Sobirjon Safaroliev

=== Women ===
Event	Gold	Silver	Bronze
Single sculls	Anna Prakaten; Uzbekistan	Liu Ruiqi; China	Shiho Yonekawa; Japan
Double sculls	China; Lu Shiyu; Shen Shuangmei	Iran; Mahsa Javer; Zeinab Norouzi	Thailand; Nuntida Krajangjam; Parisa Chaempudsa
Quadruple sculls	China; Chen Yunxia; Zhang Ling; Lü Yang; Cui Xiaotong	Iran; Fatemeh Mojallal; Nazanin Malaei; Mahsa Javer; Zeinab Norouzi	Vietnam; Lường Thị Thảo; Bùi Thị Thu Hiền; Nguyễn Thị Giang; Phạm Thị Thảo
Coxless pair	China; Wang Tingting; Zhang Xuan	Hong Kong; Cheung Hoi Lam; Leung King Wan	South Korea; Kim Ha-yeong; Lee Soo-bin
Coxless four	China; Zhang Shuxian; Liu Xiaoxin; Wang Zifeng; Xu Xingye	Japan; Sahoko Kinota; Akiho Takano; Haruna Sakakibara; Sayaka Chujo	Vietnam; Phạm Thị Huệ; Đinh Thị Hảo; Hà Thị Vui; Dư Thị Bông
Eight	China; Zhang Shuxian; Yu Siyuan; Bao Lijun; Dong Xiya; Zhang Hairong; Liu Xiaoxin; Wang Zifeng; Xu Xingye; Xu Xiaohan	Japan; Emi Hirouchi; Urara Kakishima; Chiaki Tomita; Akiho Takano; Haruna Sakakibara; Sahoko Kinota; Shiho Yonekawa; Sayaka Chujo; Saki Senda	Vietnam; Hồ Thị Lý; Trần Thị Kiệt; Phạm Thị Ngọc Anh; Lê Thị Hiền; Hà Thị Vui; Đinh Thị Hảo; Phạm Thị Huệ; Dư Thị Bông; Nguyễn Lâm Kiều Diễm
Lightweight double sculls	China; Zou Jiaqi; Qiu Xiuping	Uzbekistan; Luizakhon Islomova; Malika Tagmatova	Indonesia; Chelsea Corputty; Mutiara Rahma Putri

== Medal table ==
Rank	Nation	Gold	Silver	Bronze	Total
1	China (CHN)	11	2	0	13
2	Uzbekistan (UZB)	2	4	1	7
3	Hong Kong (HKG)	1	1	1	3
4	Japan (JPN)	0	3	1	4
5	India (IND)	0	2	3	5
6	Iran (IRI)	0	2	0	2
7	Indonesia (INA)	0	0	3	3
7	Vietnam (VIE)	0	0	3	3
9	South Korea (KOR)	0	0	1	1
9	Thailand (THA)	0	0	1	1
Totals (10 entries)		14	14	14	42

== Participating nations ==
A total of 251 athletes from 21 nations competed in rowing at the 2022 Asian Games:

- Bahrain (3)
- China (37)
- Chinese Taipei (3)
- Hong Kong (22)
- India (29)
- Indonesia (19)
- Iran (7)
- Iraq (2)
- Japan (18)
- Kazakhstan (9)
- Kuwait (4)
- Pakistan (4)
- Philippines (6)
- Saudi Arabia (4)
- Singapore (3)
- South Korea (16)
- Sri Lanka (4)
- Thailand (24)
- United Arab Emirates (1)
- Uzbekistan (18)
- Vietnam (18)
