= 2024 Asian Rowing Championships =

- Host city: Samarkand, Uzbekistan
- Dates: 10–13 October 2024
- Main venue: Samarkand Rowing Channel

The 2024 Asian Rowing Championships were the 22nd Asian Rowing Championships and took place from 10 to 13 October 2024, in Samarkand, Uzbekistan.

== Medal summary ==
=== Men ===
Event	Gold	Silver	Bronze
Single sculls	Deng Zhiwei; China	Mekhrojbek Mamatkulov; Uzbekistan	Chiu Hin Chun; Hong Kong
Double sculls	China; Shao Zhiqiang; Wang Wenzheng	Iraq; Baker Shihab; Mohammed Riyadh	Uzbekistan; Shakhboz Kholmurzaev; Mekhrojbek Mamatkulov
Quadruple sculls	China; Chen Lianxu; Wang Jiawei; Zhang Shengji; Bian Shihao	Uzbekistan; Jamal Turgunov; Mekhrojbek Mamatkulov; Shakhboz Kholmurzaev; Sobirjon Safaroliev	Kazakhstan; Bapan Askhanbek; Alexey Krasnovskyi; Ivan Chernukhin; Vladislav Galkin
Coxless pair	Uzbekistan; Dilshodjon Khudoyberdiev; Fazliddin Karimov	Hong Kong; Chan Chi Fung; Lam San Tung	Kazakhstan; Maulen Munaitpashov; David Rejepov
Coxless four	Uzbekistan; Fazliddin Karimov; Dilshodjon Khudoyberdiev; Davrjon Davronov; Alisher Turdiev	China; Wang Hao; Zhou Kangrui; Chen Jiawen; Zhang Yanghao	Kazakhstan; Arslan Seksen; Yaroslav Melnikov; Malik Toiganbayev; Arystan Aibekov
Eight	Uzbekistan; Alisher Turdiev; Davrjon Davronov; Dilshodjon Khudoyberdiev; Fazliddin Karimov; Shakhriyor Khamdamov; Samandar Khamrakulov; Evgeniy Agafonov; Shukhrat Shodiev; Farrukh Oblakulov	Japan; Yasuharu Hayashi; Taichi Hashimoto; Yuki Koretani; Makoto Tsuge; Sho Fukuta; Tomoyoshi Nakamizo; Yusuke Nakata; Shin Sasaki; Taiga Nishimura	Kazakhstan; Didar Sagimbayev; Timur Fomichyov; Vladislav Fink; Yevgeniy Karizhskiy; Arslan Seksen; Yaroslav Melnikov; Malik Toiganbayev; Arystan Aibekov; Medina Konurbayeva
Lightweight single sculls	Mohammed Riyadh; Iraq	Amir Hossein Mahmoudpour; Iran	Bùi Văn Hoàn; Vietnam
Lightweight double sculls	Uzbekistan; Shakhzod Nurmatov; Sobirjon Safaroliev	Vietnam; Đinh Thế Đức; Nguyễn Hữu Thành	Kazakhstan; Adilet Kerimbek; Artem Matussevich
Lightweight coxless four	Uzbekistan; Ozod Mamatov; Samir Rozikov; Daler Ashurov; Bobomurod Pardaev	Thailand; Phasin Chueatai; Yutthana Tamarom; Siwakorn Wongpin; Nawamin Dechudomrat	Kazakhstan; Kuanysh Bekbembetov; Alisher Mustakap; Bauyrzhan Sultanov; Timur Fomichyov

=== Women ===
Event	Gold	Silver	Bronze
Single sculls	Zhang Wenxia; China	Fatemeh Mojallal; Iran	Winne Hung; Hong Kong
Double sculls	China; Li Chaoran; Zhang Fangfang	Uzbekistan; Anna Prakaten; Malika Tagmatova	Iran; Kimia Zareei; Fatemeh Mojallal
Quadruple sculls	China; Chu Jingrong; Fu Ling; Huang Shenli; Zhang Wenxia	Iran; Kimia Zareei; Fatemeh Mojallal; Mahsa Javer; Zeinab Norouzi	Vietnam; Lường Thị Thảo; Nguyễn Thị Giang; Đinh Thị Hảo; Phạm Thị Huệ
Coxless pair	Vietnam; Đinh Thị Hảo; Phạm Thị Huệ	China; Su Xiaoyu; Zhao Zihe	Hong Kong; Leung King Wan; Wong Sheung Yee
Coxless four	China; Jiang Luyao; Xu Yingfei; Zhao Zihe; Su Xiaoyu	Vietnam; Phạm Thị Ngọc Anh; Lê Thị Hiền; Hà Thị Vui; Dư Thị Bông	Kazakhstan; Varvara Belonogova; Tamara Pervushkina; Anzhela Polyanina; Melani Zhakupova
Eight	Vietnam; Nguyễn Thị Giang; Phạm Thị Thảo; Phạm Thị Ngọc Anh; Lê Thị Hiền; Hà Thị Vui; Đinh Thị Hảo; Phạm Thị Huệ; Dư Thị Bông; Lường Thị Thảo	Kazakhstan; Mariya Lebedeva; Valentina Volkodavova; Anastassiya Kulinich; Yekaterina Noskova; Varvara Belonogova; Tamara Pervushkina; Anzhela Polyanina; Melani Zhakupova; Mariya Chernets	Uzbekistan; Sabrina Abdurashidova; Surrayo Kuzimurodova; Basima Sattorova; Oyjamol Sattorova; Raykhona Karimova; Aydana Smetullayeva; Raykhona Sattorova; Nurila Abdullaeva; Violetta Peregudova
Lightweight single sculls	Zeinab Norouzi; Iran	Malika Tagmatova; Uzbekistan	Leung Wing Wun; Hong Kong
Lightweight double sculls	Iran; Kimia Zareei; Zeinab Norouzi	Thailand; Parisa Chaempudsa; Nuntida Krajangjam	Vietnam; Lường Thị Thảo; Nguyễn Thị Giang
Lightweight quadruple sculls	Thailand; Matinee Raruen; Rawiwan Sukkaew; Parisa Chaempudsa; Nuntida Krajangjam	Kazakhstan; Medina Konurbayeva; Irina Chudina; Roza Kenges; Mariya Chernets	Uzbekistan; Shakhista Rakhmonkulova; Alina Drasutite; Shabnam Zhuraboeva; Elena Solovyova

== Medal table ==
Rank	Nation	Gold	Silver	Bronze	Total
1	China	7	2	0	9
2	Uzbekistan	5	4	3	12
3	Iran	2	3	1	6
4	Vietnam	2	2	3	7
5	Thailand	1	2	0	3
6	Iraq	1	1	0	2
7	Kazakhstan	0	2	7	9
8	Hong Kong	0	1	4	5
9	Japan	0	1	0	1
Totals (9 entries)		18	18	18	54
