= Dhananjay Pande =

Indian rower (born 1991)

Personal information
- Full name: Dhananjay Uttam Pande
- Nationality: Indian
- Born: 11 November 1991 (age 34)
- Height: 1.69 m (5 ft 7 in)
Medal record
Men's rowing
Representing India
Asian Games
Silver medal – second place	2022 Hangzhou	Eight

Dhananjay Uttam Pande (born 11 November 1991) is an Indian rower from Maharashtra. He is named in the Indian rowing team for the 2022 Asian Games at Hangzhou, China. He was part of the men's eight team that won the silver medal in the Asian Games in Hangzhou, China.

Pande was the coxswain of the Indian team that consisted of Neeraj Maan, Naresh Kalwaniya, Neetish Kumar, Charanjeet Singh, Jaswinder Singh, Bheem Singh, Punit Kumar and Ashish. All the Indian team members are from the Indian Army and have trained at the Army Rowing Node facility in Pune for over a year.

== Early life ==
He hails from the Raigad district of Maharashtra. He joined the Boys Sports Company of the Army and rowed till 2011. Later, he became coxswain.

== Career ==
- 2023: Silver medal as Coxswain of the Men's eight Indian team at the 2022 Asian Games.
- 2022: Men's eight event at Rowing World Cup, Poznan, Poland.
