= Naresh Kalwaniya =

Indian rower (born 1999)

Personal information
- Born: 15 August 1999 (age 26) Trilokpura (Nayan), Jaipur, Rajasthan, India
- Height: 186 cm (6 ft 1 in)
- Weight: 75 kg (165 lb)
- Military career
- Allegiance: India
- Branch: Indian Army
- Service years: 2017–present
- Rank: Subedar
Medal record
Men's Rowing
Representing India
Asian Games
Silver medal – second place	2022 Hangzhou	Men's Eight

Naresh Kalwaniya (born 15 August 1999) is an Indian rower from Rajasthan. He is named in the Indian rowing team for the 2022 Asian Games at Hangzhou, China. He competes in the men's eight event. He was part of the team that won the silver medal in the men's quadruple sculls at the Asian Games in Hangzhou, China.

The Indian team consisted of Neeraj Maan, Naresh Kalwaniya, Neetish Kumar, Charanjeet Singh, Jaswinder Singh, Bheem Singh, Punit Kumar and Ashish Guliyan. Dhananjay Pande was the coxswain of the team. All the Indian team members are from the Indian Army and have trained at the Army Rowing Node facility in Pune for over a year.

== Early life ==
Naresh hails from a farmers family in Amarsar town, Jaipur district, Rajasthan. To support the family he joined Army. The rifleman did well in the first two years in the domestic events and got selected for the Asian team.

== Career ==
In 2023, Kalwaniya represented India which won the silver medal in the Men's eight at the 2022 Asian Games. In 2023, he also took part in the Men's coxed four event in the Rowing World Cup, Zagreb.
