= Neetish Kumar =

Indian rower

Personal information
- Nationality: Indian
- Born: 13 November 1997 (age 28)
- Height: 1.86 m (6 ft 1 in)
Medal record
Men's rowing
Representing India
Asian Games
Silver medal – second place	2022 Hangzhou	Eight

Neetish Kumar (Hindi: नीतीश कुमार, born 13 November 1997) is an Indian rower from Uttar Pradesh. He is named in the Indian rowing team for the 2022 Asian Games at Hangzhou, China. He competes in the men's eight event. He was part of the team that won the silver medal in the men's quadruple sculls at the Asian Games in Hangzhou, China.

The Indian team consisted of Neeraj Maan, Naresh Kalwaniya, Neetish Kumar, Charanjeet Singh, Jaswinder Singh, Bheem Singh, Puneet Kumar and Ashish. Dhananjay Pande was the coxswain of the team. All the Indian team members are from the Indian Army and have trained at the Army Rowing Node facility in Pune for over a year. He rows the third seat in the eight.

== Early life ==
Neetish hails from Mavi Khurd in Baghpat, Uttar Pradesh. His father served in the Indian army and he too joined the army.

== Career ==
Kumar took part in 2022 Asian Games at Hangzhou, China, which were held in September 2023. He won a silver and a bronze medal as part of the Indian teams in the men's eight event. India finished second in the preliminary race and secured a slot in the final. In 2022, he was part of the Men's eight in the Rowing World Cup at Poznan.

== External line ==
- Neetish Kumar at World Rowing
- Neetish Kumar at InterSportStats
- Neetish Kumar at the Hangzhou 2022 Asian Games
- Rowing Federation of India list
- RFI Results - 40th Senior nationals
