= Rowing at the 2026 Asian Games – Men's lightweight double sculls =

Men's lightweight double sculls at the 2026 Asian Games
- Venue: Nagaragawa International Regatta Course
- Date: 23–24 September 2026
- Competitors: 14 from 7 nations

Medalists
gold medal	Shakhzod Nurmatov; Sobirjon Safaroliev	Uzbekistan
silver medal	Rafiq Wijdan Yasir; Ali Mardiansyah	Indonesia
bronze medal	Lam San Tung; Chan Tik Lun	Hong Kong

The men's lightweight double sculls competition at the 2026 Asian Games was held from 23 to 24 September 2026 at the Nagaragawa International Regatta Course, Gifu, Japan.

== Schedule ==
All times are Japan Standard Time (UTC+09:00)

Date	Time	Event
Wednesday, 23 September 2026	14:50	Heats
Thursday, 24 September 2026	15:30	Final

== Results ==
=== Heats ===
- Qualification: 1–2 + next 2 fastest → Final (FA)

==== Heat 1 ====
Rank	Team	Time	Notes
1	Hong Kong (HKG); Lam San Tung; Chan Tik Lun	6:44.63	FA
2	Indonesia (INA); Rafiq Wijdan Yasir; Ali Mardiansyah	6:45.62	FA
3	Japan (JPN); Masato Kobayashi; Hayato Kitanoue	6:47.23	FA
4	India (IND); Rohit; Ujjwal Kumar Singh	6:51.30	FA

==== Heat 2 ====
Rank	Team	Time	Notes
1	Uzbekistan (UZB); Shakhzod Nurmatov; Sobirjon Safaroliev	6:51.30	FA
2	Kazakhstan (KAZ); Bauyrzhan Sultanov; Alexandr Afanasyev	7:00.00	FA
3	South Korea (KOR); Lee Jong-hee; Choi Yoon-sung	7:02.52	

=== Final ===
Rank	Team	Time
1st place, gold medalist(s)	Uzbekistan (UZB); Shakhzod Nurmatov; Sobirjon Safaroliev	6:19.94
2nd place, silver medalist(s)	Indonesia (INA); Rafiq Wijdan Yasir; Ali Mardiansyah	6:23.41
3rd place, bronze medalist(s)	Hong Kong (HKG); Lam San Tung; Chan Tik Lun	6:24.84
4	India (IND); Rohit; Ujjwal Kumar Singh	6:27.42
5	Japan (JPN); Masato Kobayashi; Hayato Kitanoue	6:29.72
6	Kazakhstan (KAZ); Bauyrzhan Sultanov; Alexandr Afanasyev	6:37.48
