= Rowing at the 2026 Asian Games – Women's lightweight double sculls =

Women's lightweight double sculls at the 2026 Asian Games
- Venue: Nagaragawa International Regatta Course
- Date: 23–24 September 2026
- Competitors: 10 from 5 nations

Medalists
gold medal	Kimia Zareei; Zeinab Norouzi	Iran
silver medal	Cheung Yuen Shan; Leung Wing Wun	Hong Kong
bronze medal	Chika Yonezawa; Chiaki Tomita	Japan

The women's lightweight double sculls competition at the 2026 Asian Games was held from 23 to 24 September 2026 at the Nagaragawa International Regatta Course, Gifu, Japan.

== Schedule ==
All times are Japan Standard Time (UTC+09:00)

Date	Time	Event
Wednesday, 23 September 2026	10:00	Preliminary race
Thursday, 24 September 2026	09:40	Final

== Results ==
=== Preliminary race ===
- Qualification: All → Final (FA)

Rank	Team	Time	Notes
1	Iran (IRI); Kimia Zareei; Zeinab Norouzi	6:59.10	FA
2	Hong Kong (HKG); Cheung Yuen Shan; Leung Wing Wun	7:03.54	FA
3	Vietnam (VIE); Trần Thị Thu Hằng; Lường Thị Thảo	7:06.17	FA
4	Kazakhstan (KAZ); Yekaterina Noskova; Mariya Chernets	7:09.00	FA
5	Japan (JPN); Chika Yonezawa; Chiaki Tomita	7:12.05	FA

=== Final ===
Rank	Team	Time
1st place, gold medalist(s)	Iran (IRI); Kimia Zareei; Zeinab Norouzi	6:53.93
2nd place, silver medalist(s)	Hong Kong (HKG); Cheung Yuen Shan; Leung Wing Wun	6:59.24
3rd place, bronze medalist(s)	Japan (JPN); Chika Yonezawa; Chiaki Tomita	6:59.27
4	Vietnam (VIE); Trần Thị Thu Hằng; Lường Thị Thảo	7:10.19
5	Kazakhstan (KAZ); Yekaterina Noskova; Mariya Chernets	7:11.19
