= Rowing at the 2026 Asian Games – Men's coxless four =

Men's coxless four at the 2026 Asian Games
- Venue: Nagaragawa International Regatta Course
- Date: 23–24 September 2026
- Competitors: 28 from 7 nations

Medalists
gold medal	China; Li Chun, Li Zepeng, Shao Zhiqiang, Bian Shihao
silver medal	Uzbekistan; Fazliddin Karimov, Dilshodjon Khudoyberdiev, Maksim Golubev, Alisher Turdiev
bronze medal	Vietnam; Trần Dương Nghĩa, Thái Bảo Toàn, Hoàng Văn Đạt, Nguyễn Phú

The men's coxless four competition at the 2026 Asian Games was held from 23 to 24 September 2026 at the Nagaragawa International Regatta Course, Gifu, Japan.

== Schedule ==
All times are Japan Standard Time (UTC+09:00)

Date	Time	Event
Wednesday, 23 September 2026	15:50	Heats
Thursday, 24 September 2026	16:50	Final

== Results ==
=== Heats ===
- Qualification: 1–2 + next 2 fastest → Final (FA)

==== Heat 1 ====
Rank	Team	Time	Notes
1	Vietnam (VIE); Trần Dương Nghĩa; Thái Bảo Toàn; Hoàng Văn Đạt; Nguyễn Phú	6:23.50	FA
2	Kazakhstan (KAZ); Yaroslav Melnikov; Vladislav Yakovlev; Ivan Chernukhin; Timur Fomichyov	6:26.96	FA
3	Japan (JPN); Yuya Ishimasa; Nobuyuki Hirukawa; Kengo Kishimoto; Shotaro Tsushida	6:28.27	FA
4	India (IND); Vipul Satish Ghurde; Saurav Kumar; Babu Lal Yadav; Yogesh Kumar	6:30.47	

==== Heat 2 ====
Rank	Team	Time	Notes
1	China (CHN); Li Chun; Li Zepeng; Shao Zhiqiang; Bian Shihao	6:11.60	FA
2	Uzbekistan (UZB); Fazliddin Karimov; Dilshodjon Khudoyberdiev; Maksim Golubev; Alisher Turdiev	6:15.35	FA
3	Indonesia (INA); Ardi Isadi; Sulpianto; Ferdiansyah; Asuhan Pattiiha	6:23.41	FA

=== Final ===
Rank	Team	Time
1st place, gold medalist(s)	China (CHN); Li Chun; Li Zepeng; Shao Zhiqiang; Bian Shihao	5:49.75
2nd place, silver medalist(s)	Uzbekistan (UZB); Fazliddin Karimov; Dilshodjon Khudoyberdiev; Maksim Golubev; Alisher Turdiev	5:51.68
3rd place, bronze medalist(s)	Vietnam (VIE); Trần Dương Nghĩa; Thái Bảo Toàn; Hoàng Văn Đạt; Nguyễn Phú	5:54.40
4	Kazakhstan (KAZ); Yaroslav Melnikov; Vladislav Yakovlev; Ivan Chernukhin; Timur Fomichyov	5:55.00
5	Japan (JPN); Yuya Ishimasa; Nobuyuki Hirukawa; Kengo Kishimoto; Shotaro Tsushida	6:09.45
6	Indonesia (INA); Ardi Isadi; Sulpianto; Ferdiansyah; Asuhan Pattiiha	6:10.78
