= Salman Khan (rower) =

Indian rower

Personal information
- Nationality: Indian
- Born: 15 August 1998 (age 28) Pure Dhingai, Amethi, Uttar Pradesh
- Height: 6.5
- Military career
- Allegiance: India
- Branch: Indian Army
- Service years: 2018–present
- Rank: Naib Subedar

Sport
- Country: India
- Sport: Rowing
Medal record
Representing India
Asian Games
Bronze medal – third place	2026 Aichi-Nagoya	Doubles sculls
National Championships
Gold medal – first place	2022 Pune	Single sculls
National Games
Gold medal – first place	2022 Gujarat	Men's Quadruple Scull
Gold medal – first place	2022 Goa	Men's Quadruple Scull
Gold medal – first place	2022 Uttrakhand	Men's Quadruple Scull

Salman Khan (born 15 August 1998) is an Indian rower from a Village named Khairahna in District Amethi, Uttar Pradesh. He was part of the team that won bronze medal in the men's double sculls event at the 2026 Asian Games.

== Early life ==
Khan is from Pure Dhingai, Amethi district, Uttar Pradesh. Khan joined the Indian Army in September 2018 and is placed with the Bombay Engineering Group. He is promoted to Naib Subedar after claiming a medal at the Asian Rowing Cup. Initially, he was introduced to the sport and coached by Satywan, Satish Siraat and Prabhat Mishra, the BEG coaches. When he was 18, his father Mohammad Qasim Khan, a truck body builder, died of dengue and he was forced to work as an Uber taxi driver to take care of the family before joining the Army. He is the eldest and has five siblings, three brothers and two sisters.

== Career ==
In 2022, Khan won gold at the National Games in Gujarat and joined the Army Rowing Node, training under Kudrat Ali. In 2023, he won gold at the Senior Nationals and the Open Sprint Nationals and was selected for the Target Olympic Podium Scheme (TOPS). In 2024, he won gold at the Asian Rowing Cup. In 2025, he won silver at the Asian Rowing Championships and at the Australian Rowing Championships. At the 2026 Asian Games, Khan and Satnam Singh won bronze in the men's double sculls (M2X) in 6:13.25 at the Nagaragawa International Regatta Course on 24 September 2026. It was India's first men's double sculls medal at the Asian Games.Khan partnered with Satnam Singh to claim a bronze medal in the men's doubles sculls event (M2X) clocking 6 minutes, 13.25 seconds at the Nagaragawa International Regatta Course at Nagoya, on 24 September 2026. It is the first ever men's double sculls medal for India at the Asian Games.

In 2022, he won a gold medal at the National Games in Gujarat and was inducted into the Army Rowing Node where he trained under senior coach Kudrat Ali.

In 2023, he won gold medals at the Senior Nationals and the Open Sprint Nationals that helped him selected for the government's Target Olympic Podium Scheme (TOPS) programme.

In 2024 he won he won a gold medal at Asian Rowing Cup. it was his first international gold medal.

In 2025, he won a silver medal at Asian Rowing Championships and at another silver medal at Australian Rowing Chamionship
