= Gaurdinho =

Mascot for the FC Goa of Indian Super League

- Gaurdinho on the football pitch in 2015
- Team: FC Goa
- Description: Gaur (Indian bison)
- Origin of name: Portmanteau of the Gaur and Ronaldinho
- First seen: 2 October 2015; 10 years ago
- Last seen: 23 January 2023; 2 years ago
- Related mascot(s): Moga; Philly the Gaur
- Website: facebook.com/gaurdinho

Gaurdinho (pronounced /ɡɔːrdɪnhoʊ/) was the official mascot of FC Goa in the Indian Super League. He is a grey-colored Indian bison wearing a FC Goa jersey. Gaurdinho was first introduced in 2015 during the team's second season in the Indian Super League (ISL), making him the first and only official mascot introduced in the ISL at that time.

== Origin ==
The mascot was created by The Football Dug Out (TFDO), a professional sports management company located in Goa. Conrad Barreto, a founding member of the organization, providing insight into its origins, stated, "Our objective was to orchestrate a spirited rally reminiscent of a carnival atmosphere for FC Goa. Consequently, in collaboration with select individuals from our group and close associates, including Hillary Gomes and Varun Carvalho, the official anthem's vocalist, we engaged in extensive discussions with Vikram, the son of FC Goa's co-owner, Dattaraj Salgaoncar".

After brainstorming sessions with Vikram Salgaoncar and the club, they arrived at the creation of Gaurdinho, a fusion of the state's indigenous animal, the Gaur, and Ronaldinho, a well-known footballer from Brazil. Barreto further stated, "Given the notable presence of skilled Brazilian players, often referred to as 'samba boys', within the team, the choice seemed fitting and organic". The character's design was undertaken by Hillary Gomes, who oversees the Creative and IT Department at The Football Dug Out. Gomes conceptualized the character's appearance and attributes. Following the design phase, the costume was then sent to a manufacturing facility in Bangalore for production.

== Portrayer ==
Gourdinho was portrayed by Gaurav Padte, who was then pursuing an M.A. in English at Goa University and is a social activist from Mapusa. He was a speaker at TEDxGEC in 2016. The mascot was known for donning a grey-colored attire and making appearances on the field. Reflecting on his role, Padte expressed that wearing the Gaurdinho outfit gave him a sense of being a superhero. Throughout his life, he stated that he had dedicated himself to bringing smiles to people's faces, and being the mascot furthered helped him achieve this. Whether at the stadium or at fan rallies, Gaurdinho's interaction involved pointing at individuals, resulting in their joyful response. The mascot's presence often elicited excitement, with people dancing and showcasing happy expressions.

In 2014, Padte garnered attention during the Indian Super League (ISL) held in Goa for his involvement in post-match stadium cleanup activities alongside like-minded individuals. Dressed in the 'Gaurdinho' costume, Padte utilized his unique attire to promote cleanliness while carrying out the cleaning tasks.

Padte, known for his previous experiences as a mascot in various events, was offered the opportunity to become the mascot for FC Goa while at a party. He accepted the opportunity to showcase his humorous and adventurous side. He expressed his gratitude for The Football Dug Out (TFDO) for the opportunity.

Padte did not undergo formal training for his portrayal. Instead, he relied on self-education by watching dance videos on YouTube. His main objective was to entertain the audience through his movements. However, he faced several challenges in his performances. The costume he wore was notably cumbersome, placing considerable pressure on his head and increasing the risk of slipping and falling. Fortunately, Padte received support from the TFDO team, who assisted him in managing these risks. They provided constant supervision and guidance during his performances. Padte admitted that he perspired heavily and occasionally experienced difficulties in breathing.

Reactions to his presence elicited diverse responses, with not all individuals exhibiting a sense of excitement. Certain children experienced feelings of fear when confronted by the gaur. In one incident, Padte found it necessary to remove his mask and offer an apology to a young girl.

Padte faced the challenge of maintaining the energy and enthusiasm of a crowd comprising 18,000 individuals. His responsibilities included engaging with the audience before and after the game, as well as during halftime. To accomplish this, Padte took rounds of the stadium, interacting with the spectators. However, this responsibility presented its challenges. Wearing a costume weighing approximately 12 kilograms (26 lb), Padte had to endure the discomfort of its heaviness, exacerbated by the heat generated inside.

Padte attributes his success to both fortunate circumstances and the valuable lessons he has learned in balancing his academic pursuits and professional responsibilities. Building upon the awareness campaign he initiated in 2014, Padte highlights a significant observation from 2015: during the initial two matches, the stadium strictly prohibited the presence of plastics and food items. However, after the third game, the stadium was left in a state of disarray. While his team has not achieved the same level of cleanliness as in 2014, they remain committed to spreading the message of cleanliness by prominently displaying a banner.

== Description ==
As of October 2015, Gaurdinho became the first-of-its-kind mascot in the Indian Super League (ISL). Barreto, introduced Gaurdinho as the chosen mascot, named after the Gaur, which holds the distinction of being the state animal of the team's region. The name was infused with a touch of samba, reflecting the Brazilian influence within the team. Notably, this team stood apart from the other seven franchises in the league, as it was the sole participant with an official mascot.

== Hiatus ==
Beginning in 2016, Gaurdinho took a hiatus and abstained from making any appearances for two consecutive seasons. However, on 18 October 2018, Gaurdinho made a comeback for the fifth season of the Indian Super League, as officially revealed during an unveiling ceremony held at Inox in Panjim.

== Performances ==
On 21 February 2019, Gaurdinho, together with the Gaur Band, took part in an away match between FC Goa and Bengaluru FC at the Sree Kanteerava Stadium in Bangalore.

On 25 September 2019, Gaurdinho attended the unveiling of FC Goa's home jersey alongside Virat Kohli, the team's co-owner, and the players of FC Goa.

== Imitation ==
On 18 June 2023, the Government of Goa officially introduced Moga, an Indian bison, as the designated mascot for the upcoming 2023 National Games of India. However, the unveiling of this mascot was met with criticism from Opposition legislators during a meeting held at the Goa Legislative Assembly complex. Vijai Sardesai, the MLA representing Fatorda, expressed concerns about the striking resemblance between the government-designed Moga mascot and Gaurdinho, implying that it could be perceived as an inferior imitation.
