= Ajay Tyagi =

Indian professional rower

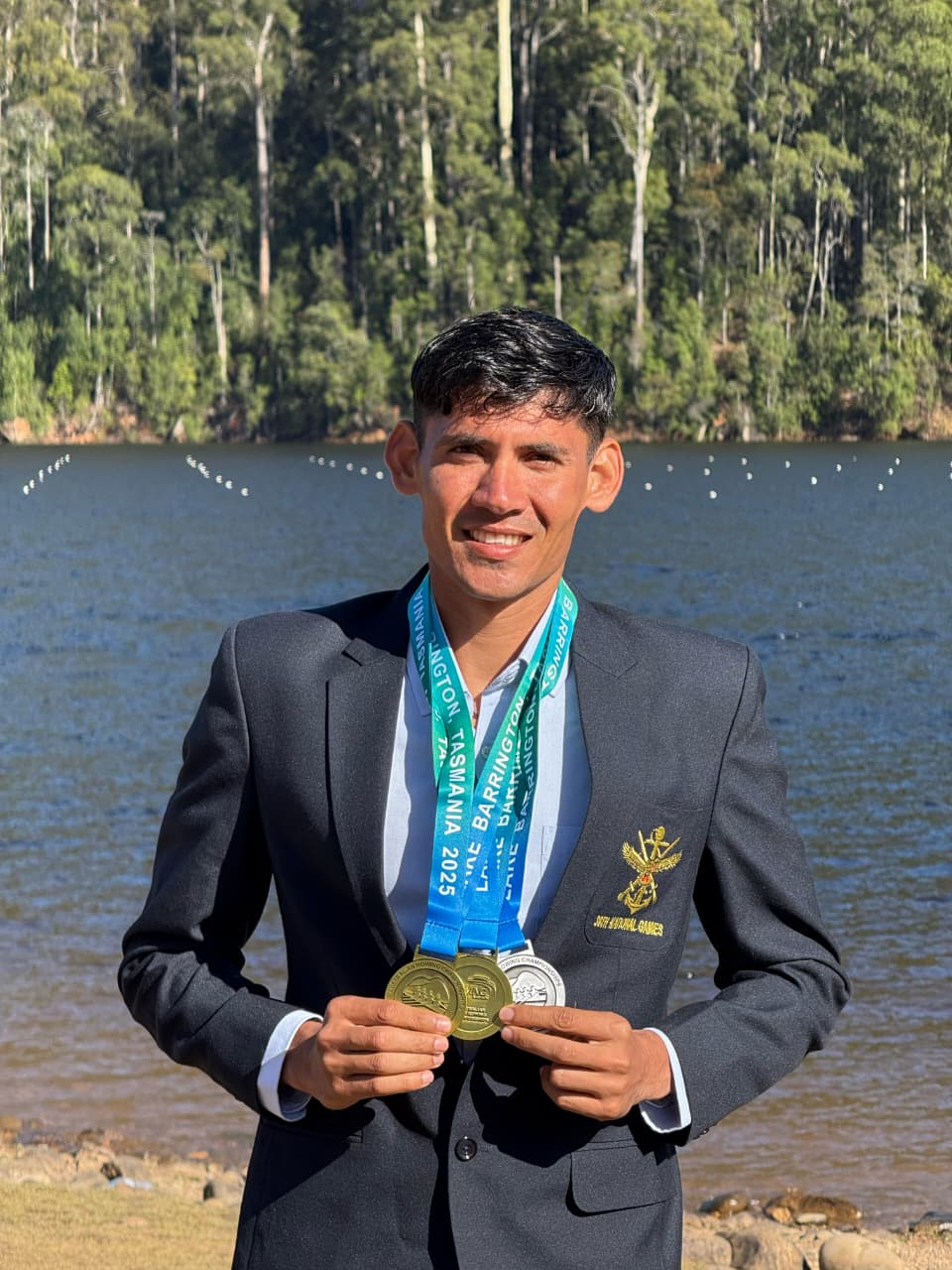
- Tyagi at Rowing Champion

Personal information
- Nationality: India
- Born: June 10, 1999 (age 27) Sara Village, Ghaziabad district, Uttar Pradesh
- Height: 6 ft (1.83 m)

Sport
- Sport: Rowing
- Rank: Naib Subedar
- Events: Lightweight Double Sculls (LM2x), Quadruple Sculls (LM4x)
- Club: Indian Army (Bombay Engineer Group)
- Coached by: Ismail Baig
Medal record
Men's Rowing
Representing India
Asian Rowing Championships
Gold medal – first place	2025 Haiphong	LM2x
Silver medal – second place	2025 Haiphong	LM4x
Australian Rowing Championships
Gold medal – first place	2025 Tasmania	LM2x
Gold medal – first place	2025 Tasmania	LM4x
Silver medal – second place	2025 Tasmania	Open Eight
National Games
Gold medal – first place	2025 Uttarakhand	LM2x
Bronze medal – third place	2023 Goa	M2x
Bronze medal – third place	2023 Goa	M4x
Senior National Rowing Championships
Gold medal – first place	2025 Bhopal	LM2x
Gold medal – first place	2025 Bhopal	M4x
Gold medal – first place	2023 Pune	LM2x
Gold medal – first place	2022 Pune	LM2x
Open Sprint National Championships
Gold medal – first place	2023 Pune	LM2x
Indoor National Rowing Championships
Gold medal – first place	2024 Moga	Lightweight Pair

Ajay Tyagi (born 10 June 1999) is an Indian professional rower who competes in the lightweight double sculls (LM2x) and quadruple sculls (LM4x) events. He is an Asian Rowing Championship gold medalist and serves as a Naib Subedar in the Indian Army.

== Early life ==
Tyagi was born in Sara village, Ghaziabad district, Uttar Pradesh. His father, Rakesh Tyagi, is a farmer and his mother's name is Kusum. He has a younger brother named Avnish Tyagi.

== Military career ==
Tyagi enlisted in the Indian Army in 2018 and serves in the Bombay Engineer Group (Bombay Sappers). He was selected for rowing training in 2021 at the Army Rowing Node (ARN) in Pune based on anthropometric parameters.

== Career ==
=== National ===
Tyagi won gold in the Lightweight Double Sculls at the 39th Senior National Rowing Championships in Pune in 2022 alongside partner Arwinder Singh. In 2023, he partnered with Olympian Arjun Lal Jat to win gold at the 40th Senior National Rowing Championships. That same year, he won gold in the LM2x event at the Open Sprint National Championships and represented Maharashtra at the 37th National Games in Goa, where he secured two bronze medals in the Double Sculls and Quadruple Sculls events.

In 2024, Tyagi won gold in the lightweight pair event at the Indoor National Rowing Championships in Moga, Punjab. He continued his domestic success in 2025, winning gold at the National Games of India in Uttarakhand (LM2x) and adding two more gold medals (LM2x and M4x) at the 42nd Senior National Rowing Championships in Bhopal.

=== International ===
Tyagi made his international debut in 2022 at World Rowing Cup I in Belgrade, Serbia, finishing in 13th place. He later participated in World Rowing Cup II in Poznań, Poland, and served as a reserve member for the 2022 Asian Rowing Championships in Thailand.

In 2023, Tyagi competed with the Indian squad at World Rowing Cup I in Zagreb, Croatia, and World Rowing Cup III in Lucerne, Switzerland.

At the 2025 Australian Rowing Championships in Tasmania, he secured two gold medals and one silver medal. Later that year, at the Asian Rowing Championships in Haiphong, Vietnam, Tyagi won the gold medal in the Lightweight Double Sculls alongside partner Lokeshwar Singh with a time of 6:40.75, and added a silver medal in the Lightweight Quadruple Sculls.

== Competitive record ==
Year	Competition	Venue	Event	Result
2022	World Rowing Cup I	Belgrade, Serbia	LM2x	13th
2022	World Rowing Cup II	Poznań, Poland	LM2x	Participation
2022	Asian Rowing Championships	Pattaya, Thailand	Team	Reserve
2022	Senior National Rowing Championships	Pune, India	LM2x	Gold
2023	World Rowing Cup I	Zagreb, Croatia	LM2x	Participation
2023	World Rowing Cup III	Lucerne, Switzerland	LM2x	Participation
2023	Senior National Rowing Championships	Pune, India	LM2x	Gold
2023	Open Sprint National Championships	Pune, India	LM2x	Gold
2023	National Games	Goa, India	M2x	Bronze
2023	National Games	Goa, India	M4x	Bronze
2024	Indoor National Rowing Championships	Moga	Lightweight Pair	Gold
2025	Senior National Rowing Championships	Bhopal, India	LM2x	Gold
2025	Senior National Rowing Championships	Bhopal, India	M4x	Gold
2025	Australian Rowing Championships	Tasmania, Australia	LM2x	Gold
2025	Australian Rowing Championships	Tasmania, Australia	LM4x	Gold
2025	Australian Rowing Championships	Tasmania, Australia	M8+	Silver
2025	Asian Rowing Championships	Haiphong, Vietnam	LM2x	Gold
2025	Asian Rowing Championships	Haiphong, Vietnam	LM4x	Silver
