= Rowing at the 2026 Asian Games – Women's lightweight single sculls =

Women's lightweight single sculls at the 2026 Asian Games
- Venue: Nagaragawa International Regatta Course
- Date: 23–24 September 2026
- Competitors: 7 from 7 nations

Medalists
gold medal	Fatemeh Mojallal	Iran
silver medal	Winne Hung	Hong Kong
bronze medal	Parisa Chaempudsa	Thailand

The women's lightweight single sculls competition at the 2026 Asian Games was held from 23 to 24 September 2026 at the Nagaragawa International Regatta Course, Gifu, Japan.

== Schedule ==
All times are Japan Standard Time (UTC+09:00)

Date	Time	Event
Wednesday, 23 September 2026	09:40	Heats
Thursday, 24 September 2026	09:20	Final

== Results ==
=== Heats ===
- Qualification: 1–2 + next 2 fastest → Final (FA)

==== Heat 1 ====
Rank	Athlete	Time	Notes
1	Fatemeh Mojallal (IRI)	7:27.32	FA
2	Winne Hung (HKG)	7:30.15	FA
3	Hồ Thị Duy (VIE)	7:53.96	FA
4	Nurzarinah Zakaria (MAS)	8:02.00	

==== Heat 2 ====
Rank	Athlete	Time	Notes
1	Parisa Chaempudsa (THA)	7:41.96	FA
2	Kim Ji-seon (KOR)	7:44.95	FA
3	Roza Kenges (KAZ)	7:49.70	FA

=== Final ===
Rank	Athlete	Time
1st place, gold medalist(s)	Fatemeh Mojallal (IRI)	7:24.57
2nd place, silver medalist(s)	Winne Hung (HKG)	7:28.54
3rd place, bronze medalist(s)	Parisa Chaempudsa (THA)	7:40.61
4	Roza Kenges (KAZ)	7:47.95
5	Kim Ji-seon (KOR)	7:54.79
6	Hồ Thị Duy (VIE)	7:58.22
