= Rowing at the 2010 Asian Games – Women's double sculls =

Women's double sculls at the 2010 Asian Games
- Venue: Guangzhou International Rowing Centre
- Date: 14–18 November 2010
- Competitors: 8 from 4 nations

Medalists
gold medal	Jin Ziwei; Tian Liang	China
silver medal	Phạm Thị Huệ; Phạm Thị Thảo	Vietnam
bronze medal	Ko Young-eun; Im Eun-ju	South Korea

The women's double sculls competition at the 2010 Asian Games in Guangzhou, China was held from 14 to 18 November 2010 at the International Rowing Centre.

== Schedule ==
All times are China Standard Time (UTC+08:00)

Date	Time	Event
Sunday, 14 November 2010	10:00	Heat
Thursday, 18 November 2010	10:00	Final

== Results ==
=== Heat ===
- Qualification: 1–4 → Final (FA)

Rank	Team	Time	Notes
1	China (CHN); Jin Ziwei; Tian Liang	7:10.08	FA
2	Vietnam (VIE); Phạm Thị Huệ; Phạm Thị Thảo	7:16.44	FA
3	South Korea (KOR); Ko Young-eun; Im Eun-ju	7:22.21	FA
4	Chinese Taipei (TPE); Pai Chien-yu; Lee Pei-chen	7:28.19	FA

=== Final ===
Rank	Team	Time
1st place, gold medalist(s)	China (CHN); Jin Ziwei; Tian Liang	7:05.68
2nd place, silver medalist(s)	Vietnam (VIE); Phạm Thị Huệ; Phạm Thị Thảo	7:17.15
3rd place, bronze medalist(s)	South Korea (KOR); Ko Young-eun; Im Eun-ju	7:20.07
4	Chinese Taipei (TPE); Pai Chien-yu; Lee Pei-chen	7:28.82
