= Fatemeh Mojallal =

Iranian rower athlete (born 2002)

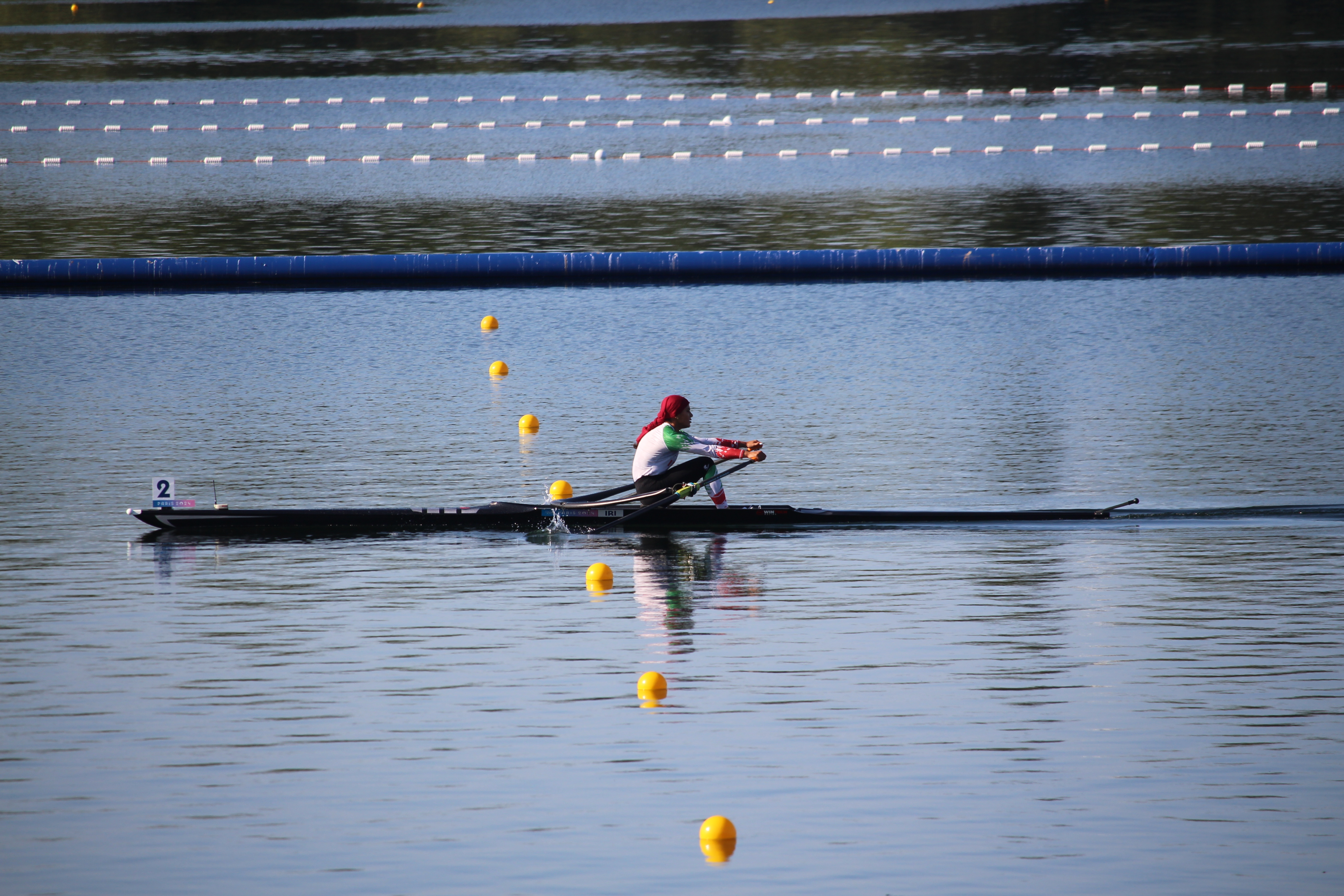

Personal information
- Full name: Fatemeh Mojallal Topraghghaleh فاطمه مجلل توپراق‌قلعه
- Nationality: Iranian
- Born: 27 July 2002 (age 24) Urmia, Iran
- Height: 1.72 m (5 ft 8 in)

Sport
- Sport: Rowing
Medal record
Women's rowing
Representing Iran
Asian Games
Gold medal – first place	2026 Aichi–Nagoya	Lwt single sculls
Silver medal – second place	2022 Hangzhou	Quadruple sculls
Bronze medal – third place	2026 Aichi–Nagoya	Single sculls
Asian Championships
Gold medal – first place	2025 Haiphong	Single sculls
Silver medal – second place	2024 Samarkand	Single sculls
Silver medal – second place	2024 Samarkand	Quadruple sculls
Bronze medal – third place	2024 Samarkand	Double sculls
Bronze medal – third place	2025 Haiphong	Double sculls

Fatemeh Mojallal Topraghghaleh (Persian: فاطمه مجلل توپراق‌قلعه, born 27 July 2002 in Urmia) is an Iranian rower athlete.

In the 2022 Asian Games, She has won a silver medal in the four-women double rowing.

She has won 2 gold medals in under-23 rowing competitions of the 2023 Asian Championship in Thailand.

Mojallal has also won a quota for the Paris Olympics in women's single rowing.

In September 2026, she won the gold medal in the women's lightweight single sculls at the 2026 Asian Games in Nagoya, Japan.
