= Moga (mascot) =

Mascot for the 2023 National Games of India

- Moga during the launch in 2023
- Description: Indian bison
- Origin of name: Konkani word meaning 'love'
- First seen: 18 June 2023; 2 years ago
- Last seen: 9 November 2023; 2 years ago
- Related mascot(s): Gaurdinho
- Website: 37nationalgamesgoa.in

Moga (Note: stylized in all caps; pronounced (English: /mɒɡɑː/)) (transl. Love) was the official mascot for the 2023 National Games of India, which were held in Goa from October to November. Representing the spirit of determination and perseverance, Moga was depicted as an emblematic representation of an Indian bison, symbolizing a set of attributes that include resilience and the ability to surmount obstacles. The mascot served as an embodiment of the commitment exhibited by athletes in their pursuit of excellence within their chosen sporting disciplines.

== History ==
=== Marketing ===
According to Govind Gaude, the Sports Minister of Goa, it's important to create excitement and anticipation for the sporting events by unveiling the mascot. The minister emphasized the need for a campaign that generates genuine interest among the public.

To prepare for the 2022 National Games of India, the organizers ran a promotional campaign, as mentioned by Gaude. They used social media platforms and billboards along the national highway to raise awareness. Prominent leaders like Pramod Sawant, the Chief Minister of Goa, asked the question "Where is Moga" on social media to grab attention.

Gaude was pleased with how the promotional campaign for Moga went. He felt that it effectively generated interest among the people of the state and got them talking about the Games. Gaude was especially impressed that even mothers were actively discussing Moga with their children, which led to more questions and curiosity. It was later revealed that Moga was the official mascot for the Games. Encouraged by the positive feedback, the Sports Minister planned to use a similar approach for the torch relay to keep the public engaged as the event approached.

=== Launch ===
On 18 June 2023, the launch of Moga took place at the Dr Shyama Prasad Mukherjee Indoor Stadium in Taleigao. The event was attended by several notable figures, including Pramod Sawant, the Chief Minister of Goa, Govind Gaude, the Sports Minister of Goa, Shripad Naik, the Union Minister of State for Tourism and Ports, P. T. Usha, the President of the Indian Olympic Association (IOA), Mary Kom, an internationally renowned boxer, and Bholo Nath Singh, the Secretary General of Hockey India, among other dignitaries.

Kom expressed her belief that Goa has the potential to become a significant sports hub, drawing in a substantial audience of 50,000 attendees. She envisions Goa as a destination known for its combination of beautiful beaches, recreational opportunities, and a thriving sports scene. Acknowledging the logistical challenge of hosting 43 events in Goa.

During the commemoration of Goa's Revolution Day, Sawant conveyed his belief that the Games had the potential to bring about a positive transformation in the sporting landscape of the state. He expressed his hope for the emergence of more accomplished athletes, highlighting the achievements of Arjuna awardees Bhakti Kulkarni and Brahmanand Sankhwalkar as inspiring examples for others to aspire to.

During the event, the official jersey for the Goan contingent was unveiled. Usha conveyed her optimistic outlook, stating her belief that the upcoming Games would witness the establishment of numerous fresh records. The event itself featured musical performances and traditional folk dances performed by Goan artists.

== Characteristics ==
Moga is an important symbol of Goa and represents its spirit. According to the Sports Minister of Goa, Govind Gaude, the bison mascot represented strength and grace. Gaude believed that the athletes and sportspeople of Goa embodied these qualities, showing unwavering determination, exceptional physical abilities, and a resilient spirit to overcome challenges.

== Backlash ==
On 20 July 2023, the Goa Legislative Assembly held a session to discuss a matter of concern. During the meeting, there were debates regarding allegations of multi-crore scams related to the infrastructure projects undertaken for the upcoming 2023 National Games of India in the state of Goa. Members of the Opposition expressed their concerns and engaged in a discussion within the assembly, presenting different perspectives on the matter.

Vijai Sardesai, the elected representative for Fatorda, raised concerns regarding the government's expenditure on the logo and mascot Bulbul 'Rubigula' launch in 2020. He pointed out that while the government spent Rs ₹68.44 lakh (US$81,000) on the event, the girl who designed the mascot was paid only ₹15,000 (US$180). Additionally, Sardesai highlighted that the government allocated ₹2.80 crore (US$330,000) to change the mascot to Moga in May of this year. Furthermore, an event management company called Moving Pictures was paid ₹5.59 crore (US$660,000) for their services related to this change. Sardesai questioned the appropriateness of these expenses and sought clarity on the matter, raising the possibility of a potential irregularity.

Sardesai offered a critical perspective on the level of attention generated by Moga, highlighting the notion that the person responsible for its name deserved special recognition. Additionally, he commented on the resemblance between the government-designed Moga mascot and the FC Goa mascot, suggesting that it could be perceived as a less successful attempt at imitation.

Within the context of political opposition, there was an inquiry into the disclosure of payment details pertaining to the launch of the logo, as well as an exploration into the reasons behind the transition from the flame-throated Bulbul mascot 'Rubigula' to the new mascot Moga. Additionally, there was a focus on understanding the financial resources allocated towards the procurement of equipment.

Govind Gaude, the Sports Minister, provided clarification regarding the mascot for the 2020 National Games of India, which were initially planned to be hosted in Goa in October 2020. However, due to the COVID-19 pandemic, the games had to be postponed. The chosen mascot for these games was the flame-throated Bulbul named 'Rubigula'. Despite the setback, the Indian Olympic Association decided to allocate the 37th edition of the National Games to the same host, Goa. As a result, a new official mascot named Moga was selected for the upcoming games.

== Appearances ==
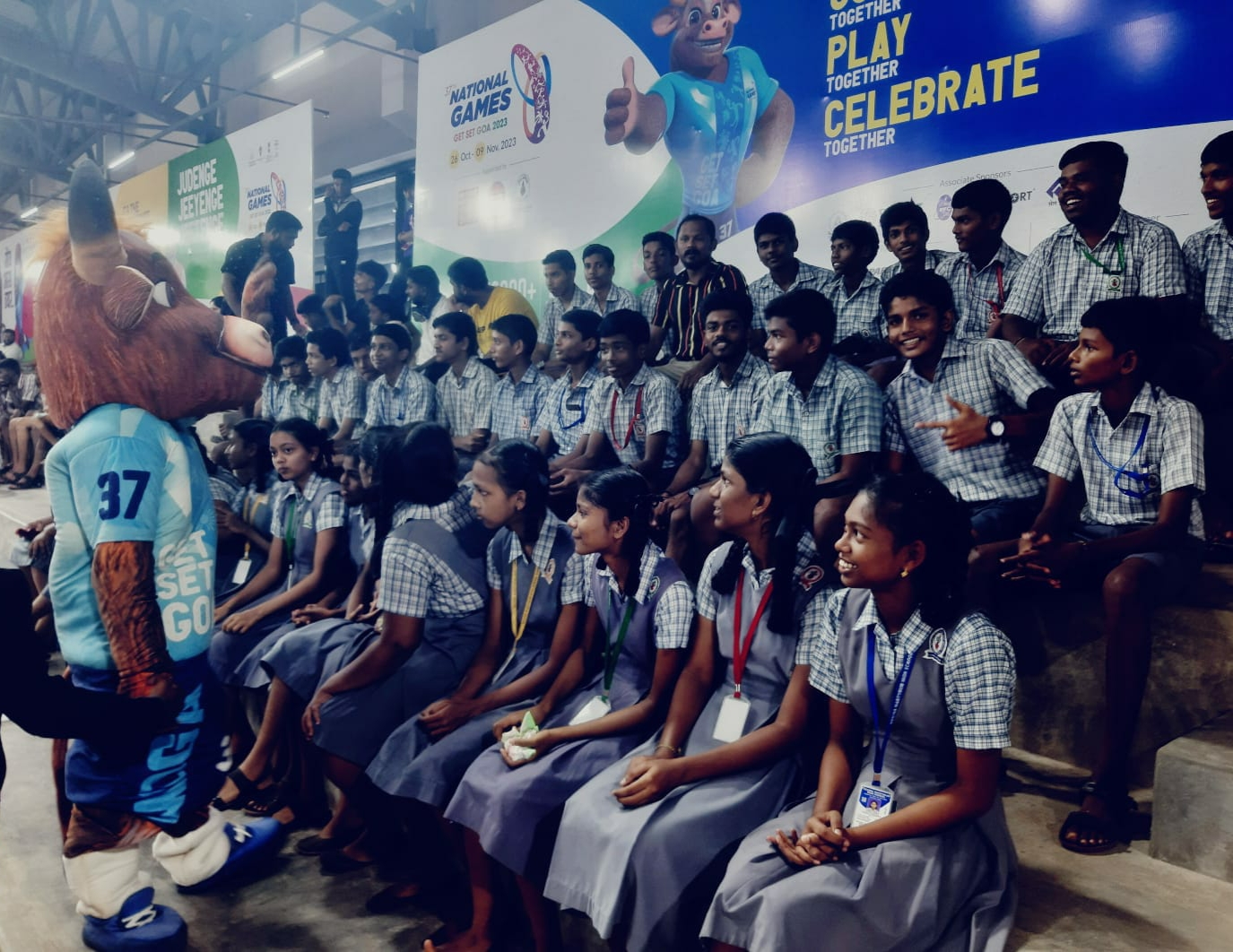
Moga interacting with the students of Regina Martyrum High School, 2023

On 17 October 2023, Moga made a visit to Don Bosco Higher Secondary School and College located in Panaji, with the purpose of raising awareness about the Games. During the visit, Moga engaged with the younger generation, conveying a message centered around the importance of participating in physical activities and maintaining good physical fitness. The primary objective of this event was to inspire and encourage the students.

On 20 October 2023, as part of the torch relay proceedings at the Mapusa Police Station, Moga made a visit.

On 21 October 2023, during the torch rally, Moga engaged in interactions with citizens and students hailing from different schools in Mapusa, adjacent to the Mapusa municipality. At the location of Oxel, Siolim, MLA Delilah Lobo, alongside local women, students from various schools in Siolim, and members of the panchayat, extended their welcome to the torch rally and the mascot.
