= Rowing at the 2026 Asian Games – Men's double sculls =

Men's double sculls at the 2026 Asian Games
- Venue: Nagaragawa International Regatta Course
- Date: 23–24 September 2026
- Competitors: 20 from 10 nations

Medalists
gold medal	Yi Xudi; Nie Yide	China
silver medal	Mekhrojbek Mamatkulov; Pavel Sorin	Uzbekistan
bronze medal	Satnam Singh; Salman Khan	India

The men's double sculls competition at the 2026 Asian Games was held from 23 to 24 September 2026 at the Nagaragawa International Regatta Course, Gifu, Japan.

== Schedule ==
All times are Japan Standard Time (UTC+09:00)

Date	Time	Event
Wednesday, 23 September 2026	09:20	Heats
Thursday, 24 September 2026	08:50	Finals

== Results ==
=== Heats ===
- Qualification: 1–2 + next 2 fastest → Final A (FA), Rest → Final B (FB)

==== Heat 1 ====
Rank	Team	Time	Notes
1	Uzbekistan (UZB); Mekhrojbek Mamatkulov; Pavel Sorin	6:14.71	FA
2	Indonesia (INA); Febrian; La Memo	6:15.26	FA
3	Thailand (THA); Narongsak Naksaeng; Premanut Wattananusith	6:29.42	FB
4	Palestine (PLE); Amel Younis; Ryan Ghalayini	6:46.37	FB
5	Sri Lanka (SRI); Mohamed Nafiran; Nuwan Sampath	6:48.17	FB

==== Heat 2 ====
Rank	Team	Time	Notes
1	China (CHN); Yi Xudi; Nie Yide	6:13.36	FA
2	India (IND); Satnam Singh; Salman Khan	6:15.63	FA
3	Iraq (IRQ); Baker Shihab; Mohammed Riyadh	6:17.81	FA
4	Japan (JPN); Taisei Miyaguchi; Masahiro Takeda	6:26.87	FA
5	Kazakhstan (KAZ); Alexey Krasnovskiy; Vladislav Galkin	6:36.28	FB

=== Finals ===
==== Final B ====
Rank	Team	Time
1	Thailand (THA); Narongsak Naksaeng; Premanut Wattananusith	6:27.42
2	Kazakhstan (KAZ); Alexey Krasnovskiy; Vladislav Galkin	6:37.14
3	Sri Lanka (SRI); Mohamed Nafiran; Nuwan Sampath	6:44.57
4	Palestine (PLE); Amel Younis; Ryan Ghalayini	6:46.37

==== Final A ====
Rank	Team	Time
1st place, gold medalist(s)	China (CHN); Yi Xudi; Nie Yide	6:09.77
2nd place, silver medalist(s)	Uzbekistan (UZB); Mekhrojbek Mamatkulov; Pavel Sorin	6:10.49
3rd place, bronze medalist(s)	India (IND); Satnam Singh; Salman Khan	6:13.25
4	Indonesia (INA); Febrian; La Memo	6:14.42
5	Iraq (IRQ); Baker Shihab; Mohammed Riyadh	6:14.93
6	Japan (JPN); Taisei Miyaguchi; Masahiro Takeda	6:29.98
