= Rowing at the 2026 Asian Games – Women's single sculls =

Women's single sculls at the 2026 Asian Games
- Venue: Nagaragawa International Regatta Course
- Date: 23–24 September 2026
- Competitors: 7 from 7 nations

Medalists
gold medal	Zhang Xinyu	China
silver medal	Anna Prakaten	Uzbekistan
bronze medal	Fatemeh Mojallal	Iran

The women's single sculls competition at the 2026 Asian Games was held from 23 to 24 September 2026 at the Nagaragawa International Regatta Course, Gifu, Japan.

== Schedule ==
All times are Japan Standard Time (UTC+09:00)

Date	Time	Event
Wednesday, 23 September 2026	14:00	Heats
Thursday, 24 September 2026	14:10	Final

== Results ==
=== Heats ===
- Qualification: 1–2 + next 2 fastest → Final (FA)

==== Heat 1 ====
Rank	Athlete	Time	Notes
1	Zhang Xinyu (CHN)	8:00.01	FA
2	Wen Ching-yang (TPE)	8:14.84	FA
3	Mutiara Rahma Putri (INA)	8:19.29	FA
4	Ahn Hee-ju (KOR)	8:31.69	

==== Heat 2 ====
Rank	Athlete	Time	Notes
1	Anna Prakaten (UZB)	7:49.99	FA
2	Fatemeh Mojallal (IRI)	8:20.29	FA
3	Joanie Delgaco (PHI)	8:25.47	FA

=== Final ===
Rank	Athlete	Time
1st place, gold medalist(s)	Zhang Xinyu (CHN)	7:21.53
2nd place, silver medalist(s)	Anna Prakaten (UZB)	7:23.99
3rd place, bronze medalist(s)	Fatemeh Mojallal (IRI)	7:35.99
4	Mutiara Rahma Putri (INA)	7:46.44
5	Wen Ching-yang (TPE)	7:52.44
6	Joanie Delgaco (PHI)	8:01.63
