= Shooting at the 2026 Asian Games – Men's 25 metre rapid fire pistol team =

Men's 25 metre rapid fire pistol team at the 2026 Asian Games
- Venue: Aichi Pref. General Shooting Gallery
- Dates: 1 October 2026
- Competitors: 24 from 8 nations

Medalists
gold medal	South Korea; Lee Gun-hyeok, Song Jong-ho, Yoon Seoyeong
silver medal	China; He Shiyu, Su Lianbofan, Yang Yuhao
bronze medal	Indonesia; Muhamad Fawwaz Aditia Farrel, Aris Febrianto, Dewa Putu Yadi Suteja

The men's 25 metre rapid fire pistol team competition at the 2026 Asian Games in Aichi, Japan was held on 1 October 2026 at Aichi Pref. General Shooting Gallery.

== Schedule ==
All times are Japan Standard Time (UTC+09:00)

Date	Time	Event
Thursday, 30 September 2026	09:40	Final Stage 1
Thursday, 1 October 2026	09:40	Final Stage 2

== Records ==
Prior to this competition, the existing world, Asian and Games records were as follows.

World Record	China	1765	Hangzhou, China	25 September 2023
Asian Record	China	1765	Hangzhou, China	25 September 2023
Games Record	China	1765	Hangzhou, China	25 September 2023

== Results ==
Rank	Team	Stage 1			Stage 2			Total	Xs	Notes
Rank	Team	8	6	4	8	6	4	Total	Xs	Notes
1st place, gold medalist(s)	South Korea (KOR)	297	297	279	293	292	291	1749	64	
	Lee Gun-hyeok	98	100	94	100	98	98	588	20	
	Song Jong-ho	99	98	91	98	99	95	580	26	
	Yoon Seo-yeong	100	99	94	95	95	98	581	18	
2nd place, silver medalist(s)	China (CHN)	295	289	286	296	294	280	1740	53	
	He Shiyu	98	96	96	98	97	91	576	14	
	Su Lianbofan	100	99	98	99	98	98	592	24	
	Yang Yuhao	97	94	92	99	99	91	572	15	
3rd place, bronze medalist(s)	Indonesia (INA)	293	288	280	289	286	284	1720	36	
	Muhamad Fawwaz Aditia Farrel	99	96	90	97	92	96	570	13	
	Aris Febrianto	96	95	96	97	96	92	572	7	
	Dewa Putu Yadi Suteja	98	97	94	95	98	96	578	16	
4	Kazakhstan (KAZ)	291	287	275	289	290	279	1711	40	
	Nikita Chiryukin	95	99	95	97	98	94	578	20	
	Artemiy Kabakov	97	92	94	95	95	90	563	5	
	Kirill Tsukanov	99	96	86	97	97	95	570	15	
5	Vietnam (VIE)	293	281	273	290	289	281	1707	41	
	Hà Minh Thành	96	92	95	95	96	95	569	11	
	Pham Quang Huy	99	94	93	98	99	95	578	18	
	Vũ Tiến Nam	98	95	85	97	94	91	560	12	
6	Japan (JPN)	291	293	271	293	284	274	1706	37	
	Hiroki Iwata	98	96	92	97	94	89	566	10	
	Hibiki Takeuchi	97	98	87	99	94	95	570	14	
	Dai Yoshioka	96	99	92	97	96	90	570	13	
7	Pakistan (PAK)							DNS		
	Ghulam Mustafa Bashir	95	96	98	98	99	92	578	19	
	Muhammad Umer Farooq									
	Mohammad Shabbir									
8	Mongolia (MGL)							DSQ		
	Enkhtaivan Badamgarav	93	91	87	96	98	86	551	12	
	Enkhtaivan Davaakhuu	95	96	88	97	96	95	567	14	
	Buyanzaya Shirgal									
