= Rowing at the 2022 Asian Games – Men's eight =

Men's eight at the 2022 Asian Games
- Venue: Fuyang Water Sports Centre
- Date: 20–24 September 2023
- Competitors: 54 from 6 nations

Medalists
gold medal	China; Li Wenlei, Chen Xianfeng, Xu Qiao, Lü Li, Ji Gaoxing, Cai Pengpeng, Ni Xulin, Nie Yide, Liang Weixiong
silver medal	India; Neeraj, Naresh Kalwaniya, Neetish Kumar, Charanjeet Singh, Jaswinder Singh, Bheem Singh, Punit Kumar, Ashish, Dhananjay Pande
bronze medal	Indonesia; Rifqi Harits Taufiqurahman, Kakan Kusmana, Sulpianto, Rendi Setia Maulana, Asuhan Pattiha, Ferdiansyah, Denri Maulidzar Al-Ghiffari, Ardi Isadi, Ujang Hasbulloh

The men's eight competition at the 2022 Asian Games in Hangzhou, China was held at 20 & 24 September 2023 at the Fuyang Water Sports Centre. China won the gold medal ahead of India and Indonesia.

== Schedule ==
All times are China Standard Time (UTC+08:00)

Date	Time	Event
Wednesday, 20 September 2023	10:50	Preliminary race
Sunday, 24 September 2023	11:30	Final

== Results ==
=== Preliminary race ===
- Qualification: 1–6 → Final (FA)

Rank	Team	Time	Notes
1	China (CHN); Li Wenlei; Chen Xianfeng; Xu Qiao; Lü Li; Ji Gaoxing; Cai Pengpeng; Ni Xulin; Nie Yide; Liang Weixiong	5:34.93	FA
2	India (IND); Neeraj; Naresh Kalwaniya; Neetish Kumar; Charanjeet Singh; Jaswinder Singh; Bheem Singh; Punit Kumar; Ashish; Dhananjay Pande	5:38.65	FA
3	Uzbekistan (UZB); Anatoliy Krasnov; Uktamjon Davronov; Shukhrat Shodiev; Fazliddin Karimov; Zafar Usmonov; Alisher Turdiev; Davrjon Davronov; Evgeniy Agafonov; Farrukh Oblakulov	5:41.97	FA
4	Indonesia (INA); Rifqi Harits Taufiqurahman; Kakan Kusmana; Sulpianto; Rendi Setia Maulana; Asuhan Pattiha; Ferdiansyah; Denri Maulidzar Al-Ghiffari; Ardi Isadi; Ujang Hasbulloh	5:45.21	FA
5	Thailand (THA); Chansahwang Ledo; Yutthana Tamarom; Phasin Chueatai; Adisorn Phuphuak; Pheeraphat Aendu; Siripong Chaiwichitchonkul; Nuttapong Sangpromcharee; Piyapong Arnunamang; Phumiphat Hangkasee	5:57.41	FA
6	Japan (JPN); Yasuharu Hayashi; Naoki Furuta; Masahiro Takeda; Kazuki Nishi; Yoshihiro Otsuka; Takumi Shiga; Masayuki Miyaura; Ryuta Arakawa; Katsuki Tatsuno	6:08.60	FA

=== Final A ===
Rank	Team	Time
1st place, gold medalist(s)	China (CHN); Li Wenlei; Chen Xianfeng; Xu Qiao; Lü Li; Ji Gaoxing; Cai Pengpeng; Ni Xulin; Nie Yide; Liang Weixiong	5:40.17
2nd place, silver medalist(s)	India (IND); Neeraj; Naresh Kalwaniya; Neetish Kumar; Charanjeet Singh; Jaswinder Singh; Bheem Singh; Punit Kumar; Ashish; Dhananjay Pande	5:43.01
3rd place, bronze medalist(s)	Indonesia (INA); Rifqi Harits Taufiqurahman; Kakan Kusmana; Sulpianto; Rendi Setia Maulana; Asuhan Pattiha; Ferdiansyah; Denri Maulidzar Al-Ghiffari; Ardi Isadi; Ujang Hasbulloh	5:45.51
4	Uzbekistan (UZB); Anatoliy Krasnov; Uktamjon Davronov; Shukhrat Shodiev; Fazliddin Karimov; Zafar Usmonov; Alisher Turdiev; Davrjon Davronov; Evgeniy Agafonov; Farrukh Oblakulov	5:45.92
5	Japan (JPN); Yasuharu Hayashi; Naoki Furuta; Masahiro Takeda; Kazuki Nishi; Yoshihiro Otsuka; Takumi Shiga; Masayuki Miyaura; Ryuta Arakawa; Katsuki Tatsuno	5:46.47
6	Thailand (THA); Chansahwang Ledo; Yutthana Tamarom; Phasin Chueatai; Adisorn Phuphuak; Pheeraphat Aendu; Siripong Chaiwichitchonkul; Nuttapong Sangpromcharee; Piyapong Arnunamang; Phumiphat Hangkasee	6:05.75
