= Rowing at the 2026 Asian Games – Women's quadruple sculls =

Women's quadruple sculls at the 2026 Asian Games
- Venue: Nagaragawa International Regatta Course
- Date: 23–24 September 2026
- Competitors: 16 from 4 nations

Medalists
gold medal	China; Xu Yixi, Li Yan, Han Mengyao, Jiao Siyu
silver medal	Iran; Hengameh Kamyab, Soha Fakhri, Mahsa Javer, Saghi Maleki
bronze medal	Japan; Miho Ueno, Mao Kamidate, Hinako Ino, Mao Kadoya

The women's quadruple sculls competition at the 2026 Asian Games was held from 23 to 24 September 2026 at the Nagaragawa International Regatta Course, Gifu, Japan.

== Schedule ==
All times are Japan Standard Time (UTC+09:00)

Date	Time	Event
Wednesday, 23 September 2026	10:30	Preliminary race
Thursday, 24 September 2026	11:00	Final

== Results ==
=== Preliminary race ===
- Qualification: All → Final (FA)

Rank	Team	Time	Notes
1	China (CHN); Xu Yixi; Li Yan; Han Mengyao; Jiao Siyu	6:16.96	FA
2	Iran (IRI); Hengameh Kamyab; Soha Fakhri; Mahsa Javer; Saghi Maleki	6:21.68	FA
3	Vietnam (VIE); Bùi Thị Thu Hiền; Nguyễn Thị Giang; Nguyễn Thị Vân Anh; Phạm Thị Thảo	6:26.53	FA
4	Japan (JPN); Miho Ueno; Mao Kamidate; Hinako Ino; Mao Kadoya	6:30.49	FA

=== Final ===
Rank	Team	Time
1st place, gold medalist(s)	China (CHN); Xu Yixi; Li Yan; Han Mengyao; Jiao Siyu	6:23.53
2nd place, silver medalist(s)	Iran (IRI); Hengameh Kamyab; Soha Fakhri; Mahsa Javer; Saghi Maleki	6:27.24
3rd place, bronze medalist(s)	Japan (JPN); Miho Ueno; Mao Kamidate; Hinako Ino; Mao Kadoya	6:29.58
4	Vietnam (VIE); Bùi Thị Thu Hiền; Nguyễn Thị Giang; Nguyễn Thị Vân Anh; Phạm Thị Thảo	6:37.29
