= Philly the Gaur =

Mascot for the FC Goa of Indian Super League

- Team: FC Goa
- Description: Gaur (Indian bison)
- First seen: 24 January 2019; 6 years ago
- Last seen: 12 May 2023; 22 months ago
- Related mascot(s): Gaurdinho
- Website: fcgoa.in

Philly the Gaur is the official mascot of FC Goa in the Indian Super League. He is a blue-colored Indian bison wearing the home-coloured FC Goa jersey. Philly the Gaur was first introduced in 2019, later succeeding his predecessor Gaurdinho as the club's official mascot.

== Appearances ==
On 24 December 2022, an event was held at the Monte de Guirim Ground in Guirim, featuring the Little Gaurs League participants. The focal point of the event was the presence of Philly the Gaur, who assumed the role of Santa Claus for the day, offering gifts to the attendees. To augment the festive ambiance, a body-painting counter was also provided.
