= 2026 World Rowing Championships – Men's lightweight double sculls =

Men's lightweight double sculls at the 2026 World Rowing Championships
- Venue: Bosbaan
- Location: Amsterdam, Netherlands
- Dates: 25–27 August
- Competitors: 20 from 10 nations
- Winning time: 6:21.93

Medalists
gold medal	Shakhzod Nurmatov; Sobirjon Safaroliev	Uzbekistan
silver medal	Naveen Alexander Shah; Maximilian Rühling	Germany
bronze medal	Jamie Copus; Sean Richardson	United States

The men's lightweight double sculls competition at the 2026 World Rowing Championships took place at Bosbaan, in Amsterdam.

== Schedule ==
The schedule was as follows:

Date	Time	Round
Tuesday, 25 August 2026	15:51	Heats
Thursday, 27 August 2026	15:11	Final B
Thursday, 27 August 2026	17:26	Final A

All times are Central European Summer Time (UTC+2)

== Results ==
=== Heats ===
The two fastest boats in each heat and the two fastest times advanced to the Final A. Other crews to Final B.

==== Heat 1 ====
Rank	Rower	Country	Time	Notes
1	Shakhzod Nurmatov; Sobirjon Safaroliev	Uzbekistan	7:23.09	FA
2	Jamie Copus; Sean Richardson	United States	7:30.11	FA
3	Ziya Mammadzada; Nurlan Pashayev	Azerbaijan	7:30.75	FB
4	Davit Lashkareishvili; Giorgi Kanteladze	Georgia	8:04.41	FB
5	Mohamad Amirul Bin Norhadi; Bin Ahmad Faiz Zuhairee	Malaysia	8:11.03	FB

==== Heat 2 ====
Rank	Rower	Country	Time	Notes
1	Naveen Alexander Shah; Maximilian Rühling	Germany	7:16.61	FA
2	Piedro Tuchtenhagen; Evaldo Mathias Becker Morais	Brazil	7:21.96	FA
3	Erik van Eijck van Heslinga; Fedrik Ploeg	Netherlands	7:21.97	FA
4	Rohit Rohit; Ujjwal Kumar Singh	India	7:26.77	FA
5	Abdulrahman Alkanderi; Yousef Alabdulhadi	Kuwait	8:34.64	FB

=== Finals ===
The A final determined the rankings for places 1 to 6. Additional rankings were determined in the other finals.

==== Final B ====
Rank	Rower	Country	Time	Total rank
1	Ziya Mammadzada; Nurlan Pashayev	Azerbaijan	7:14.61	7
2	Mohamad Amirul Bin Norhadi; Bin Ahmad Faiz Zuhairee	Malaysia	7:30.53	8
3	Davit Lashkareishvili; Giorgi Kanteladze	Georgia	7:36.65	9
4	Abdulrahman Alkanderi; Yousef Alabdulhadi	Kuwait	8:06.73	10

==== Final A ====
Rank	Rower	Country	Time
1st place, gold medalist(s)	Shakhzod Nurmatov; Sobirjon Safaroliev	Uzbekistan	6:21.93
2nd place, silver medalist(s)	Naveen Alexander Shah; Maximilian Rühling	Germany	6:23.87
3rd place, bronze medalist(s)	Jamie Copus; Sean Richardson	United States	6:27.45
4	Rohit Rohit; Ujjwal Kumar Singh	India	6:29.08
5	Erik van Eijck van Heslinga; Fedrik Ploeg	Netherlands	6:31.01
6	Piedro Tuchtenhagen; Evaldo Mathias Becker Morais	Brazil	6:31.34
