= Lekh Ram =

Indian rower (born 1996)

Personal information
- Nationality: Indian
- Citizenship: India
- Born: 11 December 1996 (age 29) Lakhasar, Sridungargarh, Bikaner, Rajasthan
- Education: Graduation
- Height: 186 cm (6 ft 1 in)
- Weight: 81 kg (179 lb)
- Military career
- Allegiance: India
- Branch: Indian Army
- Service years: 2017–present
- Rank: Naib Subedar

Sport
- Country: India
- Sport: Rowing
- Weight class: Open weight
- Event: Sweep (Strock)
Medal record
Men's rowing
Representing India
Asian Games
Bronze medal – third place	2022 Hangzhou	Coxless pair

Lekh Ram (born 11 December 1996) is an Indian rower. He won a bronze medal in the Coxless pair event in the 2022 Asian Games. He was born in a jat family and works as the rifleman in the Indian Army.

== See also ==
- Sailing in India
