= Rowing at the 2026 Asian Games – Women's coxless four =

Women's coxless four at the 2026 Asian Games
- Venue: Nagaragawa International Regatta Course
- Date: 23–24 September 2026
- Competitors: 32 from 8 nations

Medalists
gold medal	China; Zhang Shuxian, Li Duolei, Zhang Yangjing, Liu Yaqi
silver medal	Uzbekistan; Raykhona Sattorova, Mariya Sergeeva, Anna Aksenova, Aydana Smetullaeva
bronze medal	Vietnam; Phạm Thị Ngọc Anh, Lê Thị Hiền, Hà Thị Vui, Dư Thị Bông

The women's coxless four competition at the 2026 Asian Games was held from 23 to 24 September 2026 at the Nagaragawa International Regatta Course, Gifu, Japan.

== Schedule ==
All times are Japan Standard Time (UTC+09:00)

Date	Time	Event
Wednesday, 23 September 2026	10:40	Heats
Thursday, 24 September 2026	10:30	Finals

== Results ==
=== Heats ===
- Qualification: 1–2 + next 2 fastest → Final A (FA), Rest → Final B (FB)

==== Heat 1 ====
Rank	Team	Time	Notes
1	Kazakhstan (KAZ); Valentina Volkodavova; Afina Belonogova; Tamara Pervushkina; Varvara Belonogova	6:41.48	FA
2	Japan (JPN); Rena Suzuki; Sawako Iijima; Yuka Kishimoto; Kyoko Matsuda	6:43.35	FA
3	India (IND); Gurbani Kaur; Aleena Anto; Haobijam Tendenthoi Devi; Poonam	6:45.75	FA
4	Hong Kong (HKG); Hui Wing Ki; Cheung Pui Fong; Chui Nga Man; Cici Leung	6:48.23	FB

==== Heat 2 ====
Rank	Team	Time	Notes
1	China (CHN); Zhang Shuxian; Li Duolei; Zhang Yangjing; Liu Yaqi	6:27.37	FA
2	Uzbekistan (UZB); Raykhona Sattorova; Mariya Sergeeva; Anna Aksenova; Aydana Smetullaeva	6:28.91	FA
3	Vietnam (VIE); Phạm Thị Ngọc Anh; Lê Thị Hiền; Hà Thị Vui; Dư Thị Bông	6:38.39	FA
4	Indonesia (INA); Chelsea Corputty; Issa Behuku; Nurtang; Aisah Nabila	6:56.94	FB

=== Finals ===
==== Final B ====
Rank	Team	Time
1	Hong Kong (HKG); Hui Wing Ki; Cheung Pui Fong; Chui Nga Man; Cici Leung	6:58.69
2	Indonesia (INA); Chelsea Corputty; Issa Behuku; Nurtang; Aisah Nabila	7:07.06

==== Final A ====
Rank	Team	Time
1st place, gold medalist(s)	China (CHN); Zhang Shuxian; Li Duolei; Zhang Yangjing; Liu Yaqi	6:34.87
2nd place, silver medalist(s)	Uzbekistan (UZB); Raykhona Sattorova; Mariya Sergeeva; Anna Aksenova; Aydana Smetullaeva	6:38.05
3rd place, bronze medalist(s)	Vietnam (VIE); Phạm Thị Ngọc Anh; Lê Thị Hiền; Hà Thị Vui; Dư Thị Bông	6:43.86
4	Japan (JPN); Rena Suzuki; Sawako Iijima; Yuka Kishimoto; Kyoko Matsuda	6:50.42
5	Kazakhstan (KAZ); Valentina Volkodavova; Afina Belonogova; Tamara Pervushkina; Varvara Belonogova	6:51.60
6	India (IND); Gurbani Kaur; Aleena Anto; Haobijam Tendenthoi Devi; Poonam	6:55.32
