= Rowing at the 2022 Asian Games – Women's quadruple sculls =

Women's quadruple sculls at the 2022 Asian Games
- Venue: Fuyang Water Sports Centre
- Date: 20–25 September 2023
- Competitors: 20 from 5 nations

Medalists
gold medal	China; Chen Yunxia, Zhang Ling, Lü Yang, Cui Xiaotong
silver medal	Iran; Fatemeh Mojallal, Nazanin Malaei, Mahsa Javer, Zeinab Norouzi
bronze medal	Vietnam; Lường Thị Thảo, Bùi Thị Thu Hiền, Nguyễn Thị Giang, Phạm Thị Thảo

The women's quadruple sculls competition at the 2022 Asian Games in Hangzhou, China was held on 20 & 25 September 2023 at the Fuyang Water Sports Centre.

== Schedule ==
All times are China Standard Time (UTC+08:00)

Date	Time	Event
Wednesday, 20 September 2023	16:30	Preliminary race
Monday, 25 September 2023	10:30	Final

== Results ==
=== Preliminary race ===
- Qualification: 1–5 → Final (FA)

Rank	Team	Time	Notes
1	China (CHN); Chen Yunxia; Zhang Ling; Lü Yang; Cui Xiaotong	6:43.94	FA
2	Iran (IRI); Fatemeh Mojallal; Nazanin Malaei; Mahsa Javer; Zeinab Norouzi	6:55.02	FA
3	Vietnam (VIE); Lường Thị Thảo; Bùi Thị Thu Hiền; Nguyễn Thị Giang; Phạm Thị Thảo	7:02.11	FA
4	Kazakhstan (KAZ); Anzhela Polyanina; Melani Zhakupova; Svetlana Germanovich; Mariya Chernets	7:03.37	FA
5	Indonesia (INA); Julianti; Nurtang; Chelsea Corputty; Mutiara Rahma Putri	7:50.70	FA

=== Final ===
Rank	Team	Time
1st place, gold medalist(s)	China (CHN); Chen Yunxia; Zhang Ling; Lü Yang; Cui Xiaotong	6:42.84
2nd place, silver medalist(s)	Iran (IRI); Fatemeh Mojallal; Nazanin Malaei; Mahsa Javer; Zeinab Norouzi	6:51.82
3rd place, bronze medalist(s)	Vietnam (VIE); Lường Thị Thảo; Bùi Thị Thu Hiền; Nguyễn Thị Giang; Phạm Thị Thảo	6:54.84
4	Indonesia (INA); Julianti; Nurtang; Chelsea Corputty; Mutiara Rahma Putri	6:56.50
5	Kazakhstan (KAZ); Anzhela Polyanina; Melani Zhakupova; Svetlana Germanovich; Mariya Chernets	7:07.50
