= Rowing at the 2022 Asian Games – Men's coxless pair =

Men's coxless pair at the 2022 Asian Games
- Venue: Fuyang Water Sports Centre
- Date: 20–24 September 2023
- Competitors: 12 from 6 nations

Medalists
gold medal	Lam San Tung; Wong Wai Chun	Hong Kong
silver medal	Shekhroz Hakimov; Dilshodjon Khudoyberdiev	Uzbekistan
bronze medal	Babu Lal Yadav; Lekh Ram	India

The men's coxless pair competition at the 2022 Asian Games in Hangzhou, China was held on 20 and 24 September 2023 at the Fuyang Water Sports Centre.

== Schedule ==
All times are China Standard Time (UTC+08:00)

Date	Time	Event
Wednesday, 20 September 2023	10:40	Preliminary race
Sunday, 24 September 2023	11:10	Final

== Results ==
=== Preliminary race ===
- Qualification: 1–6 → Final (FA)

Rank	Team	Time	Notes
1	Uzbekistan (UZB); Shekhroz Hakimov; Dilshodjon Khudoyberdiev	6:33.37	FA
2	Hong Kong (HKG); Lam San Tung; Wong Wai Chun	6:34.23	FA
3	India (IND); Babu Lal Yadav; Lekh Ram	6:42.59	FA
4	Kazakhstan (KAZ); Yaroslav Melnikov; Timur Fomichyov	6:54.07	FA
5	Indonesia (INA); Toni Sutisna; Rio Rizki Darmawan	6:57.59	FA
6	South Korea (KOR); Kim Dong-yong; Park Hyun-su	7:24.02	FA

=== Final ===
Rank	Team	Time
1st place, gold medalist(s)	Hong Kong (HKG); Lam San Tung; Wong Wai Chun	6:44.20
2nd place, silver medalist(s)	Uzbekistan (UZB); Shekhroz Hakimov; Dilshodjon Khudoyberdiev	6:48.11
3rd place, bronze medalist(s)	India (IND); Babu Lal Yadav; Lekh Ram	6:50.41
4	Kazakhstan (KAZ); Yaroslav Melnikov; Timur Fomichyov	7:01.83
5	Indonesia (INA); Toni Sutisna; Rio Rizki Darmawan	7:03.11
6	South Korea (KOR); Kim Dong-yong; Park Hyun-su	7:19.89
