= Rowing at the 2022 Asian Games – Women's coxless pair =

Women's coxless pair at the 2022 Asian Games
- Venue: Fuyang Water Sports Centre
- Date: 20–25 September 2023
- Competitors: 6 from 3 nations

Medalists
gold medal	Wang Tingting; Zhang Xuan	China
silver medal	Cheung Hoi Lam; Leung King Wan	Hong Kong
bronze medal	Kim Ha-yeong; Lee Soo-bin	South Korea

The women's pair competition at the 2022 Asian Games in Hangzhou, China, was held on 20 & 25 September 2023 at the Fuyang Water Sports Centre.

== Schedule ==
All times are China Standard Time (UTC+08:00)

Date	Time	Event
Wednesday, 20 September 2023	16:00	Preliminary race
Monday, 25 September 2023	09:50	Final

== Results ==
=== Preliminary race ===
- Qualification: 1–3 → Final (FA)

Rank	Team	Time	Notes
1	China (CHN); Wang Tingting; Zhang Xuan	7:28.42	FA
2	Hong Kong (HKG); Cheung Hoi Lam; Leung King Wan	7:42.69	FA
3	South Korea (KOR); Kim Ha-yeong; Lee Soo-bin	7:47.62	FA

=== Final ===
Rank	Team	Time
1st place, gold medalist(s)	China (CHN); Wang Tingting; Zhang Xuan	7:32.22
2nd place, silver medalist(s)	Hong Kong (HKG); Cheung Hoi Lam; Leung King Wan	7:42.00
3rd place, bronze medalist(s)	South Korea (KOR); Kim Ha-yeong; Lee Soo-bin	7:51.54
