= Rowing at the 2022 Asian Games – Men's coxless four =

Men's coxless four at the 2022 Asian Games
- Venue: Fuyang Water Sports Centre
- Date: 20–25 September 2023
- Competitors: 28 from 7 nations

Medalists
gold medal	Uzbekistan; Shekhroz Hakimov, Dilshodjon Khudoyberdiev, Davrjon Davronov, Alisher Turdiev
silver medal	China; Li Wenlei, Chen Xianfeng, Xu Qiao, Cai Pengpeng
bronze medal	India; Jaswinder Singh, Bheem Singh, Punit Kumar, Ashish

The men's four competition at the 2022 Asian Games in Hangzhou, China was held from 20 to 25 September 2023 at the Fuyang Water Sports Centre.

== Schedule ==
All times are China Standard Time (UTC+08:00)

Date	Time	Event
Wednesday, 20 September 2023	16:10	Heats
Thursday, 21 September 2023	15:20	Repechage
Monday, 25 September 2023	10:10	Final

== Results ==
=== Heats ===
- Qualification: 1 → Final (FA), 2–4 → Repechage (R)

==== Heat 1 ====
Rank	Team	Time	Notes
1	India (IND); Jaswinder Singh; Bheem Singh; Punit Kumar; Ashish	6:20.47	FA
2	Indonesia (INA); Ferdiasyah; Asuhan Pattiha; Denri Maulidzar Al-Ghiffari; Ardi Isadi	6:31.62	R
3	South Korea (KOR); Myeong Su-seong; Kim Hyun-tae; Jeong Yong-jun; Kim Hwi-gwan	6:32.31	R
4	Hong Kong (HKG); Wong Ho Yin; Yeung Man Hon; To Siu Po; Chau Yee Ping	6:45.76	R

==== Heat 2 ====
Rank	Team	Time	Notes
1	Uzbekistan (UZB); Shekhroz Hakimov; Dilshodjon Khudoyberdiev; Davrjon Davronov; Alisher Turdiev	6:13.06	FA
2	China (CHN); Li Wenlei; Chen Xianfeng; Xu Qiao; Cai Pengpeng	6:14.15	R
3	Japan (JPN); Yoshihiro Otsuka; Kazuki Nishi; Yasuharu Hayashi; Takumi Shiga	6:27.97	R

=== Repechage ===
- Qualification: 1–4 → Final (FA)

Rank	Team	Time	Notes
1	China (CHN); Li Wenlei; Chen Xianfeng; Xu Qiao; Cai Pengpeng	6:13.62	FA
2	Indonesia (INA); Ferdiasyah; Asuhan Pattiha; Denri Maulidzar Al-Ghiffari; Ardi Isadi	6:18.41	FA
3	Japan (JPN); Yoshihiro Otsuka; Kazuki Nishi; Yasuharu Hayashi; Takumi Shiga	6:20.38	FA
4	South Korea (KOR); Myeong Su-seong; Kim Hyun-tae; Jeong Yong-jun; Kim Hwi-gwan	6:27.06	FA
5	Hong Kong (HKG); Wong Ho Yin; Yeung Man Hon; To Siu Po; Chau Yee Ping	6:28.26	

=== Final ===
Rank	Athlete	Time
1st place, gold medalist(s)	Uzbekistan (UZB); Shekhroz Hakimov; Dilshodjon Khudoyberdiev; Davrjon Davronov; Alisher Turdiev	6:04.96
2nd place, silver medalist(s)	China (CHN); Li Wenlei; Chen Xianfeng; Xu Qiao; Cai Pengpeng	6:10.04
3rd place, bronze medalist(s)	India (IND); Jaswinder Singh; Bheem Singh; Punit Kumar; Ashish	6:10.81
4	Japan (JPN); Yoshihiro Otsuka; Kazuki Nishi; Yasuharu Hayashi; Takumi Shiga	6:14.01
5	Indonesia (INA); Ferdiasyah; Asuhan Pattiha; Denri Maulidzar Al-Ghiffari; Ardi Isadi	6:17.55
6	South Korea (KOR); Myeong Su-seong; Kim Hyun-tae; Jeong Yong-jun; Kim Hwi-gwan	6:36.30
