= Satnam Singh (rower) =

Indian rower (born 2000)

Personal information
- Nationality: Indian
- Born: 5 July 2000 (age 26) Fatta Maluka, Mansa, Punjab
- Height: 190 cm (6 ft 3 in)
- Weight: 83 kg (183 lb)
- Military career
- Allegiance: India
- Branch: Indian Navy
- Service years: 2019–present
- Rank: Chief Petty Officer

Sport
- Country: India
- Sport: Rowing
Medal record
Representing India
Asian Games
Bronze medal – third place	2026 Aichi-Nagoya	Doubles sculls
Bronze medal – third place	2022 Hangzhou	Quadruple sculls
National Championships
Silver medal – second place	2019 Pune	Men's Four
Gold medal – first place	2023 Pune	Single sculls
Silver medal – second place	2022 Pune	Single sculls
National Games
Silver medal – second place	2022 Gujarat	Men's Four

Satnam Singh (born 5 July 2000) is an Indian rower. He is named in the Indian rowing team for the 2022 Asian Games at Hangzhou, China. He competes in the men's quadruple sculls event. He was part of the team that won the bronze medal in the men's quadruple sculls at the Asian Games in Hangzhou, China. He won a bronze medal in the men's double sculls along with Salman Khan at the 2026 Asian Games.

== Early life ==
Singh is from Fatta Maluka village, Mansa district, Punjab. He is the son Amrik Singh, a small time farmer and his mother, Harjeet Kaur, is a homemaker. He is a student of Olympian Swarn Singh Virk, who groomed him as his heir in the single sculls. He is employed with the Indian Navy.

== Career ==
In 2023, he took part in the Youth Olympics. He also became the first from the Navy to win the title in this event as he broke the monopoly of the Army. He won the gold medal in the men's single scull event at the 40th Senior National Rowing Championships held in Pune. In September, he won a bronze medal as part of the Indian teams in the men's quadruple sculls at the 2022 Asian Games.
