= Babu Lal Yadav =

Indian rower

Personal information
- Full name: Babu Lal Yadav
- Nationality: India
- Born: 10 March 2001 (age 25) Khatkar, shrimadhopur, Sikar, Rajasthan
- Education: B.B.D Collage Chimanpura, Shahpura, Jaipur
- Height: 186 cm (6 ft 1 in)
- Weight: 73 kg (161 lb)
- Military career
- Allegiance: India
- Branch: Indian Army
- Service years: 2020–present
- Rank: Naib Subedar
- Service number: JC-473693Y
- Unit: 6th Rajputana Rifles

Sport
- Country: India 🇮🇳
- Sport: Rowing 🚣
- Weight class: light weight
- Event: Sweep (Bow)
- Coached by: Ismail Baig
Medal record
Men's rowing
Representing India
Asian Games
Bronze medal – third place	2022 Hangzhou	Coxless pair
Asian Championships
Silver medal – second place	2025 Vietnam	Lightweight coxless four

Babu Lal Yadav (born 10 March 2001) is an Indian rower. He won a bronze medal in the Coxless pair event in the 2022 Asian Games.
