= Shakhzod Nurmatov =

Uzbekistani rower (born 1999)

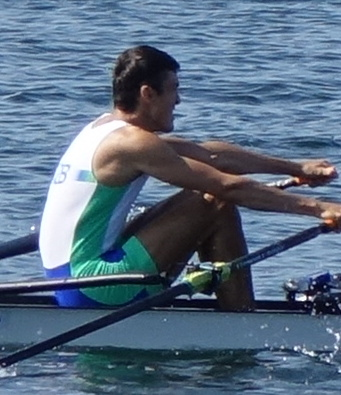

Personal information
- Born: 7 April 1999 (age 27)
- Weight: 68 kg (150 lb)

Sport
- Country: Uzbekistan
- Sport: Rowing
Medal record
Men's rowing
Representing Uzbekistan
World Championships
Gold medal – first place	2026 Amsterdam	Lwt double sculls
Asian Games
Gold medal – first place	2026 Aichi–Nagoya	Lwt double sculls
Silver medal – second place	2022 Hangzhou	Quadruple sculls
Bronze medal – third place	2022 Hangzhou	Lwt double sculls

Shakhzod Nurmatov (born 7 April 1999) is an Uzbekistani rower. He represented Uzbekistan at the 2024 Summer Olympics. He won Uzbekistan's first gold medal at the 2026 World Rowing Championships.

== Career ==
In June 2025, during the World Rowing Cup in Lucerne, Nurmatov won a bronze medal in the lightweight single sculls. This marked the first time an Uzbek rower won a medal at the World Cup.

In August 2026, he competed at the 2026 World Rowing Championships and won a gold medal in the lightweight double sculls, along with Sobirjon Safaroliev. This was the first gold medal won by Uzbek rowers at the World Rowing Championships.
