= Charanjeet Singh (rower) =

Indian rower (born 1997)

Personal information
- Nationality: Indian
- Born: 25 November 1997 (age 28) Nangla, Bathinda, Punjab
- Height: 183 cm (6 ft 0 in)
- Weight: 75 kg (165 lb)
- Military career
- Allegiance: India
- Branch: Indian Army
- Service years: 2016–present
- Rank: Subedar

Sport
- Country: India
- Sport: Rowing
Medal record
Representing India
Asian Games
Silver medal – second place	2022 Hangzhou	Men's Eight
National Championships
Gold medal – first place	2019 Pune	Men's Four
Gold medal – first place	2023 Pune	Men's Eight
Silver medal – second place	2022 Pune	Men's Pairs
National Games
Silver medal – second place	2022 Gujarat	Men's Four

Charanjeet Singh (born 25 November 1997) is an Indian rower from Punjab. He was named to the Indian rowing team for the 2022 Asian Games in Hangzhou, China, where he won a silver medal in the men's eight.

== Early life ==
Charanjeet hails from a farmer's family in Bathinda, Punjab.
