= Hanna Prakatsen =

Russian rower (born 1992)

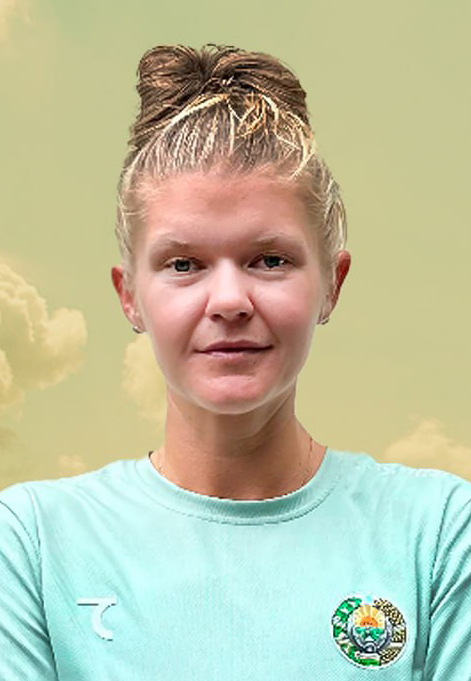
- Prakatsen in 2024

Personal information
- Full name: Hanna Vitalyevna Prakatsen
- Nationality: Uzbekistan
- Born: 6 September 1992 (age 34) Minsk, Belarus

Sport
- Sport: Rowing
Medal record
Women's rowing
Representing (Russia) ROC
Olympic Games
| Silver medal – second place | 2020 Tokyo | Single sculls |
Representing Russia
European Championships
| Gold medal – first place | 2021 Varese | Single sculls |
Representing Uzbekistan
Asian Games
| Gold medal – first place | 2022 Hangzhou | Single sculls |
| Silver medal – second place | 2026 Aichi–Nagoya | Single sculls |

Hanna Vitalyevna Prakatsen (pronounced [ˈxanːə ˈprakətsɨn]; Russian: Анна Витальевна Пракатень, romanized: Anna Vitalyevna Prakaten, IPA: [ˈanːə ˈprakətʲɪnʲ]; born 6 September 1992) is a Belarusian-born rower. She competed in the 2020 Summer Olympics. Since 2023, she has represented Uzbekistan as Anna Prakaten. She competed in the 2024 Summer Olympics representing Uzbekistan.
