= Punit Kumar =

Indian rower

Personal information
- Nationality: Indian
- Born: 8 August 1994 (age 31) Kakra, Bhudhana, Muzaffarnagar, Uttar Pradesh
- Height: 188 cm (6 ft 2 in)
- Weight: 84 kg (185 lb)
- Military career
- Allegiance: India
- Branch: Indian Army
- Service years: 2014–present
- Rank: Subedar

Sport
- Country: India
- Sport: Rowing
Medal record
Representing India
Asian Games
Silver medal – second place	2022 Hangzhou 🇨🇳	Eight
Bronze medal – third place	2022 Hangzhou 🇨🇳	Men's Coxless Four
World Rowing Championship
	2019 linz 🇦🇹	Men's Coxless Four
world cup
	2023 Lucerne 🇨🇭	Men's Coxless Four
	2023 Zagreb 🇭🇷	Men's Coxless Four
	2022 Poznan 🇵🇱	Men's Cox Eight's
	2022 Belgrade 🇷🇸	Men's Coxless Four
Asian championship
Bronze medal – third place	2022 Rayong 🇹🇭	Men's Coxless Four
Silver medal – second place	2021 Rayong 🇹🇭	Men's Coxless Four
Bronze medal – third place	2019 Chungju 🇰🇷	Men's Cox Eight
National Games
Gold medal – first place	2022 Gujarat	Men's four
Gold medal – first place	2023 Goa	Men's four
National Championships
Gold medal – first place	2023 Pune	Men's four
Gold medal – first place	2023 Pune	Men's Eight
Gold medal – first place	2022 Pune	Men's Pair
Gold medal – first place	2022 Pune	Men's Eight
Gold medal – first place	2019 Hyderabad	Men's pair
Gold medal – first place	2018 Pune	Men's Four
Open Sprint National Rowing Championships
Gold medal – first place	2023 Pune	Men's pair
Gold medal – first place	2022 Pune	Men's Pair
Gold medal – first place	2019 Hyderabad	Men's pair
Gold medal – first place	2019 pune	Men's Four

Punit Kumar (born 8 August 1994) is an Indian rower from Uttar Pradesh. He was named to the Indian rowing team for the 2022 Asian Games in Hangzhou, China, where he won a silver medal in the men's eight and a bronze medal in the men's coxless four.

== Early life ==
Kumar hails from Kakra, Shahpur block, Muzaffarnagar, Uttar Pradesh. He started rowing at the age of 18, while in the army.
