= Lường Thị Thảo =

Vietnamese rower (born 1999)

Personal information
- Nationality: Vietnamese
- Born: 11 May 1999 (age 27)

Sport
- Sport: Rowing
Medal record
Women's rowing
Representing Vietnam
Asian Games
Gold medal – first place	2018 Jakarta–Palembang	Lwt quadruple sculls
Bronze medal – third place	2022 Hangzhou	Quadruple sculls

Lường Thị Thảo (born 11 May 1999) is a Vietnamese rower. She competed in the women's lightweight double sculls event at the 2020 Summer Olympics.
