= Neeraj (rower) =

Indian rower

Personal information
- Nationality: Indian
- Born: 14 December 1999 (age 26) Khwaja Nagla, Baghpat, Uttar Pradesh, India
- Height: 189 cm (6 ft 2 in)
- Weight: 82 kg (181 lb)
- Military career
- Allegiance: India
- Branch: Indian Army
- Service years: 2018–present
- Rank: Subedar

Sport
- Country: India
- Sport: Men's rowing
Medal record
Representing India
Men's rowing
Asian Games
Silver medal – second place	2022 Hangzhou	Eight
National Games of India
Gold medal – first place	2022 Gujarat	Men's eight
National Championships of India
Gold medal – first place	2022 Pune	Men's Eight
Silver medal – second place	2023 Pune	Coxless Four
Silver medal – second place	2023 Pune	Men's Eight
Silver medal – second place	2024 Pune	Men's Eight
Junior National Championships of India
Gold medal – first place	2016 Kollam, Kerala	Men's Four
Open Sprint National Rowing Championships of India
Gold medal – first place	2023 Pune	Men's Four

Neeraj (born 14 December 1999) is an Indian rower from Uttar Pradesh. He was named to the Indian rowing team for the 2022 Asian Games in Hangzhou, China, where he won a silver medal in the men's eight.

== Early life ==
Neeraj hails from Khawaja Nangla, a small Village in Chhaprauli Block of Baghpat District in Uttar Pradesh.

== Career ==
In December 2016, he won gold as part of the Junior men's coxless four BSC team at Kollam, Kerala.

In January 2022, as part of the men's eight SER team, he won the gold at the 39th Senior National Rowing Championship at the Army Rowing Node, Pune.

In February 2023, as part of the Coxless Fours team of the Army, he won a silver medal at the 40th Senior National Rowing Championship at the Army Rowing Node, Pune.

In September 2023, he won a silver medal as part of the Indian team in the men's eight at the 2022 Asian Games.
