= Sobirjon Safaroliev =

Uzbekistani rower (born 2002)

Personal information
- Nationality: Uzbekistan
- Born: 2 May 2002 (age 24)

Sport
- Sport: Rowing
Medal record
Men's rowing
Representing Uzbekistan
World Championships
| Gold medal – first place | 2026 Amsterdam | Lwt double sculls |
Asian Games
| Gold medal – first place | 2026 Aichi–Nagoya | Lwt double sculls |
| Silver medal – second place | 2022 Hangzhou | Quadruple sculls |
| Bronze medal – third place | 2022 Hangzhou | Lwt double sculls |

Sobirjon Safaroliev (born 2 May 2002) is an Uzbekistani rower. He competed in the 2020 Summer Olympics.
