= Jaswinder Singh (rower) =

Indian rower

Asian Games Medalist Jaswinder Singh
Personal information
- Citizenship: India
- Born: 8 August 1997 (age 29) Kaleran, Dhuri, Sangrur, Punjab
- Height: 189 cm (6 ft 2 in)
- Weight: 79 kg (174 lb)
- Military career
- Allegiance: India
- Branch: Indian Army
- Service years: 2017–present
- Rank: Subedar

Sport
- Country: India
- Sport: Rowing
- Weight class: heavyweight
- Event: Sweep (Bow)
Medal record
Representing India
Asian Games
Silver medal – second place	2022 Hangzhou	Eight
Bronze medal – third place	2022 Hangzhou	Coxless four
Asian Rowing Championships
Bronze medal – third place	2022 Rayong	Coxless four
National Games of India
Gold medal – first place	2022 Gujarat	Coxless four
Gold medal – first place	2023 Goa	Coxless four
National Championships of India
Gold medal – first place	2022 Pune	Men's Eight
Gold medal – first place	2023 Pune	Coxless Four
Gold medal – first place	2023 Pune	Men's Eight
Gold medal – first place	2024 Pune	Coxless four
Open Sprint National Rowing Championships of India
Silver medal – second place	2023 Pune	Coxless Four
Gold medal – first place	2024 Pune	Coxless four

Jaswinder Singh (born 8 August 1997) is an Indian rower from Punjab. He was named to the Indian rowing team for the 2022 Asian Games in Hangzhou, China, where he won a silver medal in the men's eight and a bronze medal in the men's coxless four.

== Early life ==
Singh hails from a farmer's family in the Kalera village of Dhuri block, Sangrur, Punjab. He joined the army in 2017 as a sepoy to support his family.

== Dates of rank ==
Insignia	Rank	Component	Date of rank
	Hawaldar	Indian Army	1 /July/ 2023
	Subedar	Indian Army	01/ Feb/2024
