= Winne Hung =

Hong Kong rower (born 1999)

Personal information
- Native name: 洪詠甄 (Hung Wing-yan)
- Born: 10 April 1999 (age 27) Hong Kong
- Height: 1.73 m (5 ft 8 in)

Sport
- Country: Hong Kong
- Sport: Rowing

Winne Hung Wing-yan (Chinese: 洪詠甄; born 10 April 1999) is a rower from Hong Kong. She competed in the 2020 Summer Olympics, held July–August 2021 in Tokyo. She won the silver medal in the women's lightweight single sculls at the 2026 Asian Games.
