= Bheem Singh =

Indian rower

Personal information
- Nationality: Indian
- Born: June 5, 1997 (age 29) Chiruni, Mundawar, Alwar, Rajasthan
- Height: 184 cm (72 in)
- Weight: 80 kg (180 lb)
- Military career
- Allegiance: India
- Branch: Indian Army
- Service years: 2018–present
- Rank: Subedar

Sport
- Country: India
- Sport: Rowing
- Weight class: Heavy weight
- Event: Sweep (Strock)
- Team: India

Achievements and titles
- World finals: World rowing cup 4th position Croatia
- National finals: 12 Gold & 1 Silver
Medal record
Men's rowing
Representing India
Asian Games
Silver medal – second place	2022 Hangzhou, China	Eight
Bronze medal – third place	2022 Hangzhou, China	Coxless four
Asian Rowing Championships
Bronze medal – third place	2022 Rayong, Thailand	Coxless four
National Games of India
Gold medal – first place	2022 Gujarat	Coxless four
Gold medal – first place	2023 Goa	Coxless four
Gold medal – first place	2025 Uttarakhand	Coxless pair
National Championships of India
Gold medal – first place	2022 Pune	Coxless four
Gold medal – first place	2022 Pune	Men's Eight
Gold medal – first place	2023 Pune	Coxless four
Gold medal – first place	2023 Pune	Eight
Gold medal – first place	2024 Pune	Coxless four
Gold medal – first place	2025 Bhopal	Coxless Pair
Gold medal – first place	2025 Bhopal	Men's Eight
Open Sprint National Rowing Championships of India
Gold medal – first place	2022 Pune	Coxless four
Silver medal – second place	2023 Pune	Coxless four
Gold medal – first place	2024 Pune	Coxless four

Bheem Singh (born 5 June 1997) is an Indian rower from Rajasthan. He was named to the Indian rowing team for the 2022 Asian Games in Hangzhou, China, where he won a silver medal in the men's eight and a bronze medal in the men's coxless four.
