= 2023 National Games of India =

Sports event

37th National Games of India
- Host city: Mapusa, Panjim, Ponda, Vasco da Gama, Margao, and Delhi (for Cycling (Track) and Golf event only)
- Motto: Get Set Goa
- Teams: 37
- Athletes: 10,000+
- Sport: 43
- Opening: 26 October 2023
- Closing: 9 November 2023
- Opened by: Narendra Modi (Prime Minister of India)
- Main venue: GMC Athletic Stadium, Bambolim
- Website: 37th National Games

The 2023 National Games of India, also known as the 37th National Games of India and informally as Goa 2023 were held from 26 October to 9 November 2023 in the state of Goa.

== Host ==
Goa Olympic Association was given hosting rights by the Indian Olympic Association after the closing ceremony held for the 2022 National Games of India at Surat on 13 October 2022.

Earlier Goa had been the host for the 36th edition, but due to a surge of COVID-19, Goa declared that it was unable to host the event.

== Venues ==
The games were held across the cities of Mapusa, Panjim, Ponda, Vasco and Margao. While Cycling (Track) and Golf events were held in Delhi.

=== Goa ===
Mapusa

- Peddem Sports Complex
  - Badminton hall (Cue sports)
  - Hockey ground (Hockey)
  - Indoor Hall (Boxing and Gymnastics)
- Chapora river (Canoeing and Rowing)
- Mendrem Shooting Range (Shooting)

Panjim

- SPM Indoor Stadium (Badminton, Fencing and Volleyball)
- Campal Indoor Stadium (Netball, Table tennis and Kabaddi)
- Campal Outdoor Grounds (Pencak silat, and Weightlifting)

Ponda

- Ponda Swimming pool
- Goa Engineering College, Farmagudi - Ponda
- Ponda Multi-Purpose Indoor Stadium

Vasco

- Tilak Maidan Football Ground
- Chicalim Multi-Purpose Ground
- Chicalim Squash Facility

Margao

== Participating teams ==
Teams came from all 28 states and eight union territories of India as well as a team representing Indian Armed Forces.

- Andaman and Nicobar Islands
- Andhra Pradesh
- Arunachal Pradesh
- Assam
- Bihar
- Chandigarh
- Chhattisgarh
- Dadra and Nagar Haveli and Daman and Diu
- Delhi
- Goa
- Gujarat
- Haryana
- Himachal Pradesh
- Jammu and Kashmir
- Jharkhand
- Karnataka
- Kerala
- Ladakh
- Lakshadweep
- Madhya Pradesh
- Maharashtra
- Manipur
- Meghalaya
- Mizoram
- Nagaland
- Odisha
- Puducherry
- Punjab
- Rajasthan
- Services
- Sikkim
- Tamil Nadu
- Telangana
- Tripura
- Uttar Pradesh
- Uttarakhand
- West Bengal

== Marketing ==
The official logo of the games and the mascot, Moga an Indian bison, was unveiled in June 2023. 'Moga (Note: stylized in all caps; pronounced (English: /mɒɡɑː/)) (transl. Love) was the official mascot for the Games, representing the spirit of determination and perseverance, Moga was depicted as an emblematic representation of an Indian bison, symbolizing a set of attributes that include resilience and the ability to surmount obstacles. The mascot served as an embodiment of the commitment exhibited by athletes in their pursuit of excellence within their chosen sporting disciplines.

== Sports ==
43 disciplines were contested in the 2023 National Games. Several new sports were added to the event, such as sqay, beach football, roll ball, golf, sepak takraw, kalaripayattu, pencak silat and Mini golf. Additionally, yachting and taekwondo made a return after their exclusion during the previous edition.

Traditional sports lagori and gatka were included as demonstration sports.

37th National Games of India
- Aquatics
  - Diving
  - Swimming
  - Water polo
- Archery
- Athletics
- Badminton
- Basketball
  - 3x3 basketball
- Beach sports
  - Beach football
  - Beach handball
  - Beach volleyball
- Boxing
- Canoeing
- Cue sports
  - Billiards
  - Snooker
- Cycling
- Fencing
- Field hockey
- Football
- Golf
  - Lawn golf
  - Mini golf
- Gymnastics
- Handball
- Lawn bowls
- Martial arts
  - Gatka
  - Judo
  - Kalaripayattu
  - Pencak silat
  - Sqay
  - Taekwondo
  - Wushu
- Modern pentathlon
- Netball
- Rollball
- Rowing
- Rugby union
- Shooting
- Skateboarding
- Softball
- Soft tennis
- Squash
- Swimming
- Table tennis
- Tennis
- Traditional sports
  - Kabaddi
  - Kho kho
  - Lagori
  - Sepak takraw
- Triathlon
- Volleyball
- Weightlifting
- Wrestling
- Yachting
- Yoga sport
  - Mallakhamba
  - Yogasana

== Medal table ==
2023 National Games medal table
Rank	State	Gold	Silver	Bronze	Total
1	Maharashtra	80	69	79	228
2	Services	66	27	33	126
3	Haryana	62	55	75	192
4	Madhya Pradesh	37	36	39	112
5	Kerala	36	24	27	87
6	Karnataka	32	32	37	101
7	Manipur	30	22	30	82
8	Delhi	29	26	67	122
9	Goa*	27	27	38	92
10	Tamil Nadu	19	26	32	77
11	Punjab	17	26	32	75
12	Assam	14	20	22	56
13	Rajasthan	14	18	33	65
14	Jammu and Kashmir	14	14	18	46
15	Uttar Pradesh	11	24	36	71
16	Odisha	10	18	30	58
17	Gujarat	8	2	21	31
18	West Bengal	7	23	26	56
19	Andhra Pradesh	7	5	15	27
20	Jharkhand	6	5	14	25
21	Arunachal Pradesh	6	2	5	13
22	Telangana	4	10	11	25
23	Chandigarh	4	8	4	16
24	Himachal Pradesh	4	2	5	11
25	Uttarakhand	3	7	14	24
26	Andaman and Nicobar Islands	3	4	1	8
27	Mizoram	2	3	0	5
28	Chhattisgarh	2	2	16	20
29	Nagaland	1	3	4	8
30	Bihar	0	3	5	8
31	Puducherry	0	2	5	7
32	Tripura	0	1	0	1
33	Dadra and Nagar Haveli and Daman and Diu	0	0	2	2
34	Lakshadweep	0	0	1	1
34	Sikkim	0	0	1	1
Totals (35 entries)		555	546	778	1,879

== Notes ==
Preceded by 2022 National Games of India	National Games of India	Succeeded by 2025 National Games of India
