= Nagaragawa International Regatta Course =

Japanese regatta course

Coordinates: 35.1731°N 136.6713°E

The 34th World Rowing Championships were held at the Nagaragawa International Regatta Course in Kaizu, Gifu Prefecture, Japan, between 29 August and 4 September 2005.

The 2005 championships were the first championships to be held in Asia.

The regatta infrastructure at the Nagaragawa International Regatta Course was designed and built with the 2005 World Championships in mind.

== Gallery ==
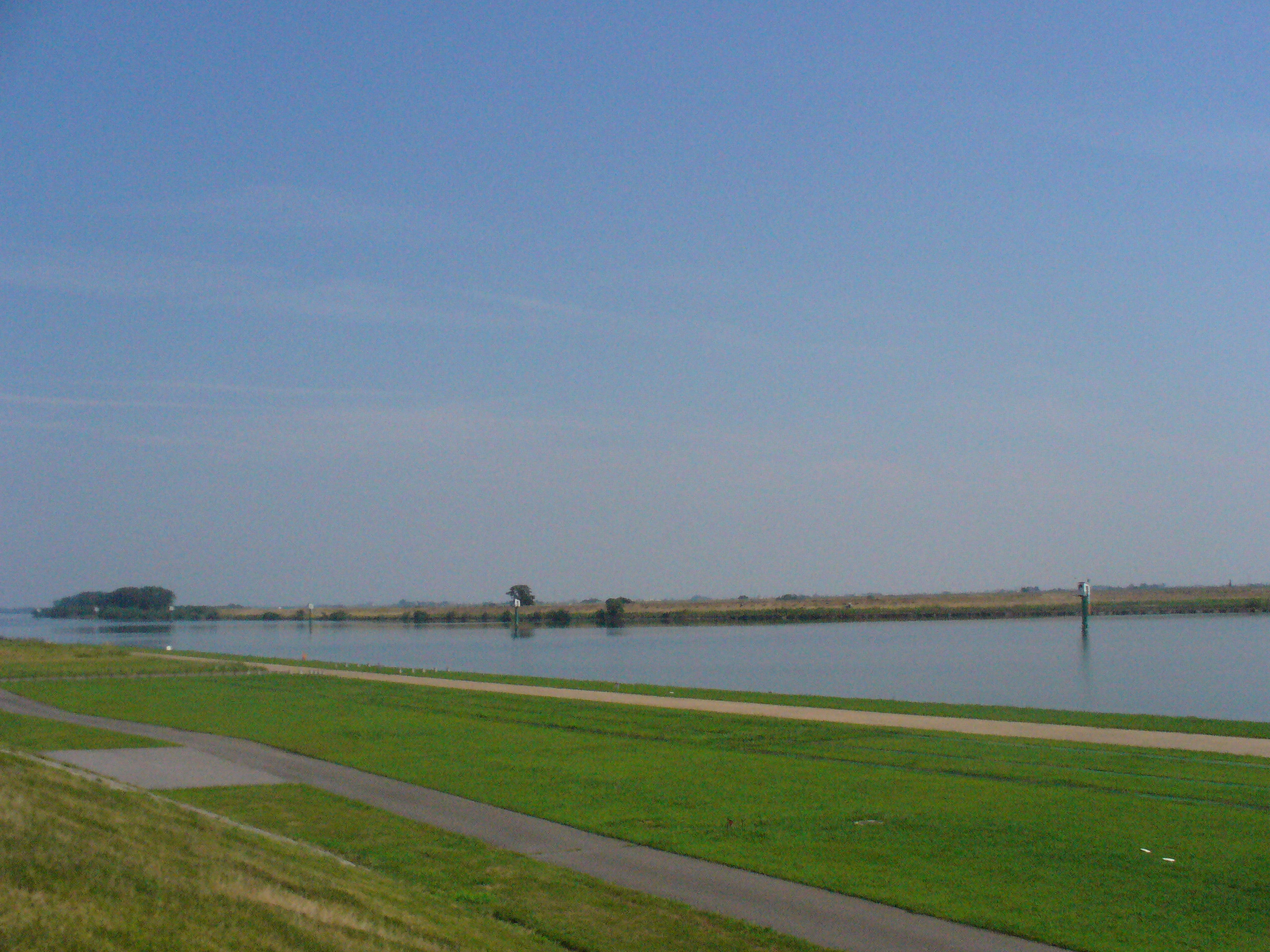
Nagaragawa International Regatta Course

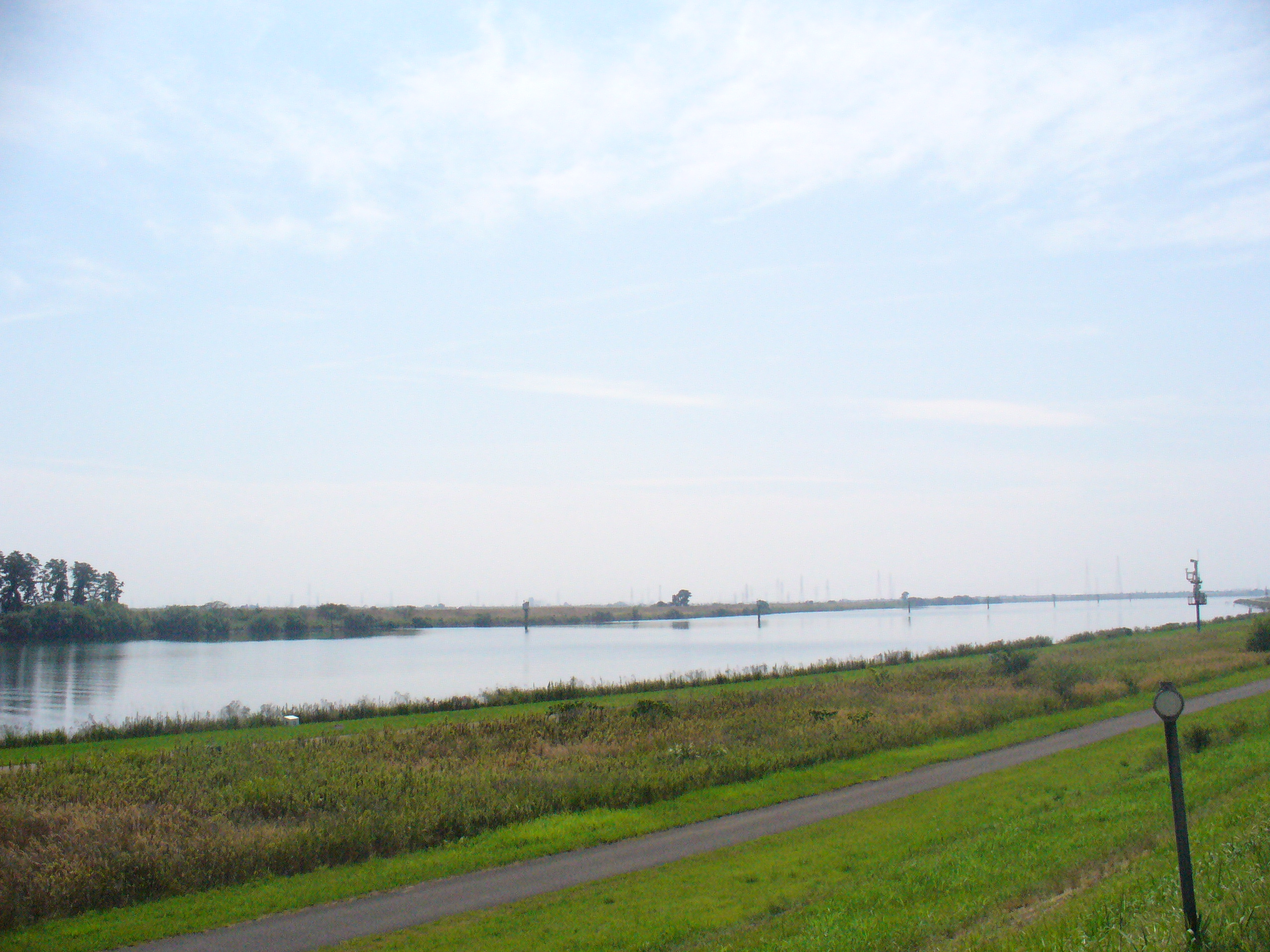

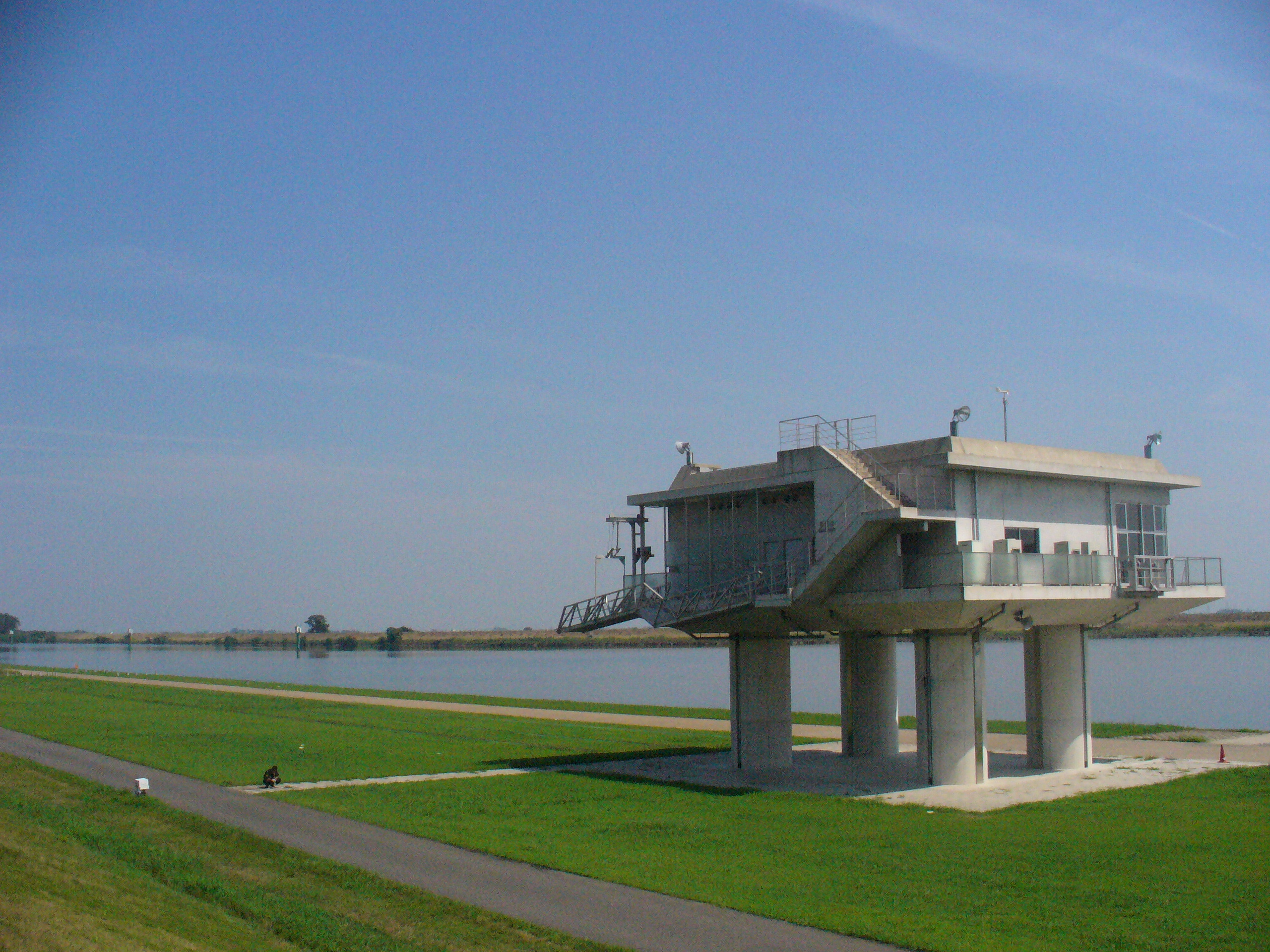
