= Southern Avenue, Kolkata =

Road in Kolkata, India

Southern Avenue
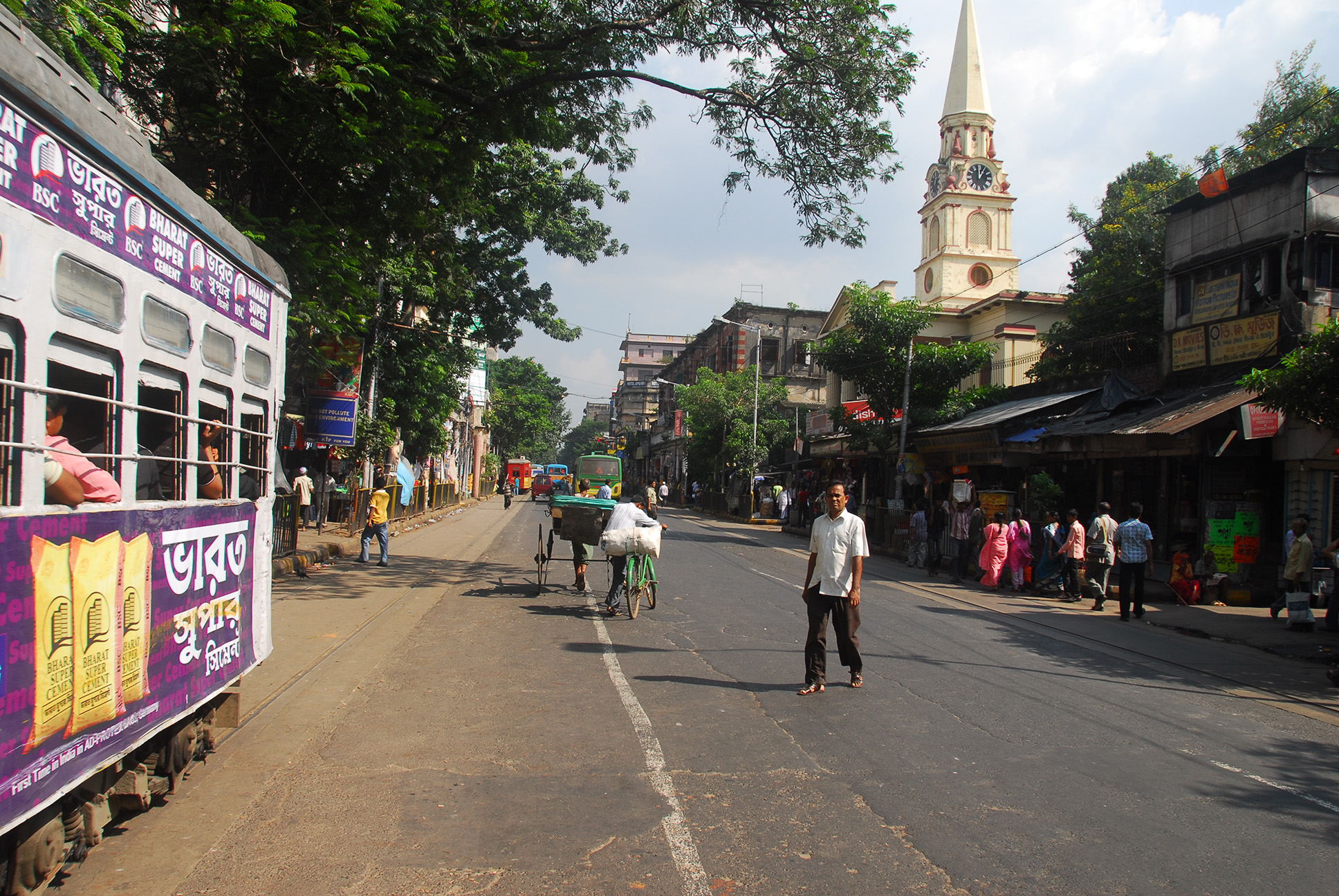
- Former name(s): Southern Avenue
- Maintained by: Kolkata Municipal Corporation
- Length: 3 km (1.9 mi)
- Location: Kolkata, India
- Postal code: 700029
- Nearest Kolkata Metro station: Kalighat
- Coordinates: 22.512270°N 88.356031°E
- west end: Kalighat
- east end: Gol Park

Southern Avenue is an avenue in South Kolkata connecting Golpark with Kalighat. It falls under the Ballygunge area. It is a 3-kilometre-long (1.9 mi) road with a centre boulevard that runs from Gariahat Road on the east to Shyama Prasad Mukherjee Road on the west, crossing Sarat Bose Road-Deboki Kumar Bose Sarani (near Rabindra Sarobar Stadium) on its way. The road is renamed after Dr. Meghnad Saha, a famous Indian scientist but the original name Southern Avenue is used commonly.

== Localities ==
Rabindra Sarobar, earlier called Dhakuria Lake/Ballygunge Lake, an artificial lake, is on Southern Avenue. It comprises areas leased to several rowing clubs and cricket academies, a Safari garden, a virtually defunct children's park and play center (Lily Pool), an auditorium Nazrul Mancha, swimming pool training centres etc. Many prominent Roads either originate from or merge into Southern Avenue on its course either to its north or south, namely Keyatala Road, Jatin Bagchi Road, Lake Road, Lake View Road, Sarat Chatterjee Avenue, Lake Avenue, Lake Place, S R Das Road & Janak Road. Southern Avenue is dotted with beautiful private bungalows and several high rise apartments like 'Dakshinayan', 'Green View', 'Abhisarika', 'Ananda', 'Ashoka', 'Avenue House', 'Sarobar', 'Lake Towers', 'Arihant Garden' and 'Fort Legend' to name a few.

== Landmarks ==
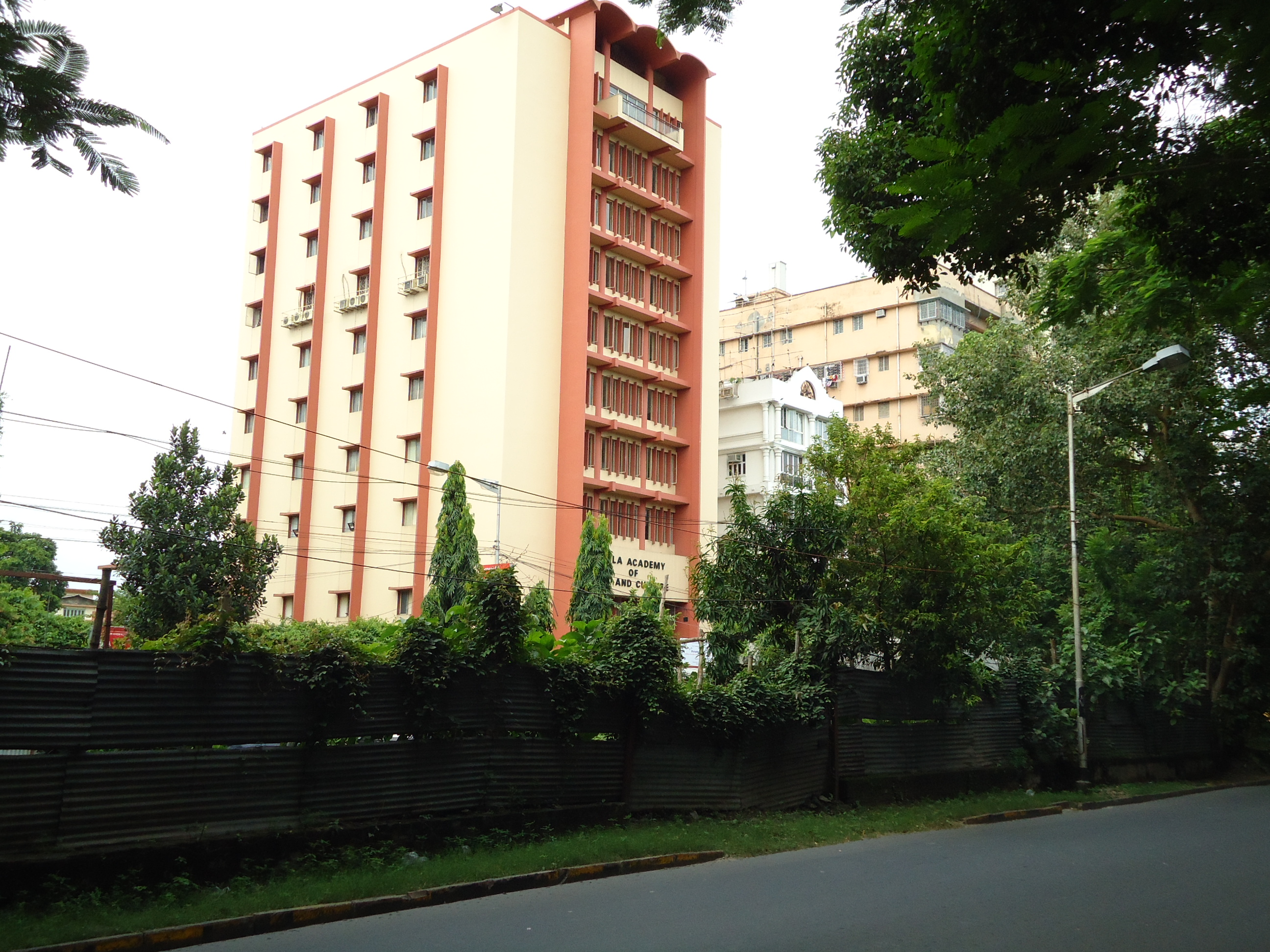
Birla Academy of Art & Culture

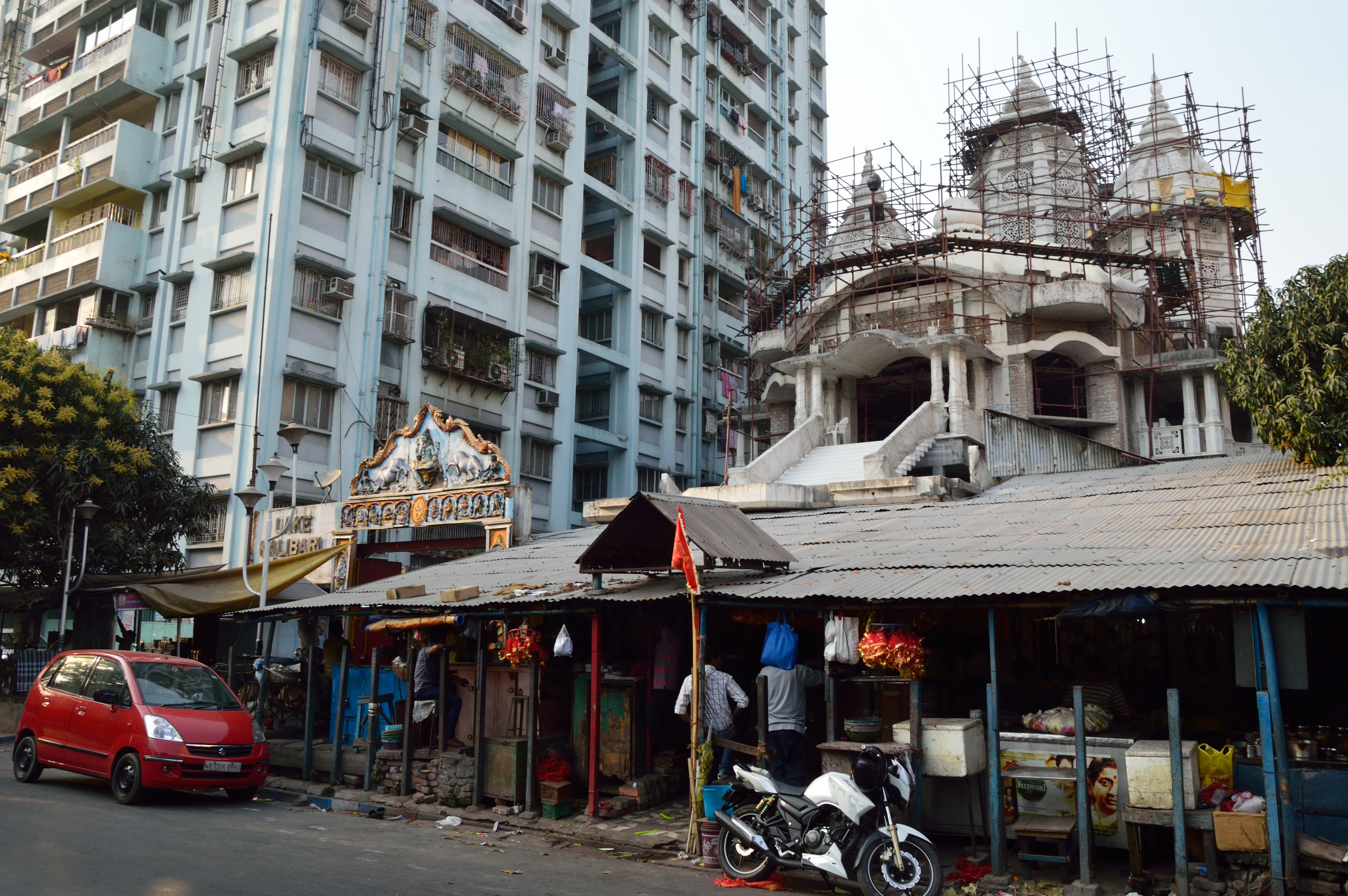
Lake Kalibari

- Rabindra Sarobar or Dhakuria Lake; an artificial lake created when the area south of Kalighat was drained and new streets laid out by Calcutta Municipal Development Authority (CMDA).
- Birla Academy of Art and Culture
- Ramakrishna Mission Institute of Culture, Gol Park
- Lake Kalibari
- Indian Life Saving Society (ILSS), Kolkata, formerly called Anderson Club
- Nazrul Mancha, Kolkata
- Vivekananda Park
- Calcutta Rowing Club
- Bengal Rowing Club
- Rabindra Sarobar Stadium (Lake Stadium)
- AMRI Medical Centre
- Morris Garage showroom "MG KOLKATA"
- The Asoka Stores (Medicine Shop)
- Medinova Diagnostic Centre
- Southern Plaza Hotel
- Menoka Cinema (on Sarat Chatterjee Avenue)
- Southern Avenue swimming club
- Nava Nalanda High School
- NG Medicare
- Vibes

One of the most important places on the avenue is the Birla Academy of Art and Culture Museum which was established in 1966. Collections include paintings of the medieval period as well as modern art and some archaeological specimens. The Museum holds regular exhibitions of modern Indian sculptors and painters. One of the restaurants that is near to the Southern Avenue is the Wrong Place (Spelt at times as 'Xrong Place').

== Restaurants ==
- The Grub Club Telephone
- Indthalia
- The French Loaf (on Jatin Bagchi Road)
- Marco Polo
- Mandarin
- Tandoor House
- Oceania (Hotel Southern Plaza)
- The Silver Oak
- Casa Toscana (on Sarat Chatterjee Avenue)
- The Funjabi Tadka
- Crave Foodworks
- Garden Cafe
- Azad Hind Dhaba
- Macazzo
- What's Up Cafe
- The Dugout
- Bijoli Grill
