= Rowing in India =

- Country: India
- Governing body: Rowing Federation of India
- National team(s): India
- First played: 1858

International competitions
- Asian Games gold: Bajrang Lal Takhar

India's history in rowing dates back to the British era. The first club, the Calcutta Rowing Club was founded in 1858. The Rowing Federation of India administers the sport in the country. India's first ever Asian Games gold medal was won by Bajrang Lal Takhar in 2010 but the country has never won an Olympic medal in the sport. Three Indian rowers have qualified for the 2012 London Olympics.

== Total medals won by Indian Rowers in Major tournaments ==
Competition	Gold	Silver	Bronze	Total
Asian Games	2	7	19	28
Total	2	7	19	28

- updated till 2023

=== List of National Sports award recipients in Rowing, showing the year, award, and gender ===
Year	Recipient	Award	Gender
1983	Parvin K. Uberoy	Arjuna Award	Male
1984	Mohd. Amin Naik	Arjuna Award	Male
1991	Dalvir Singh	Arjuna Award	Male
1994	R. S. Bhanwala	Arjuna Award	Male
1996	Surender Singh Waldia	Arjuna Award	Male
1999	Jagjit Singh	Arjuna Award	Male
2000	Surender Singh Kanwasi ^{+}	Arjuna Award	Male
2001	Kasam Khan	Arjuna Award	Male
2002	Inderpal Singh	Arjuna Award	Male
2004	Jenil Krishnan	Arjuna Award	Male
2007	Bajrang Lal Takhar	Arjuna Award	Male
2009	Satish Joshi	Arjuna Award	Male
2014	Saji Thomas	Arjuna Award	Male
2015	Sawarn Singh	Arjuna Award	Male
2020	Dattu Baban Bhokanal	Arjuna Award	Male
2003	Smita Shirole Yadav	Dhyan Chand Award	Female
2016	Rajendra Pralhad Shelke	Dhyan Chand Award	Male
2020	Manjeet Singh	Dhyan Chand Award	Male
2014	Jose Jacob ^{+}	Dronacharya Award	Male
2005	Ismail Baig	Dronacharya Award	Male

Key
+ Indicates a Lifetime contribution honour
