= Lake Kalibari =

Hindu temple dedicated to goddess Kali in Kolkata

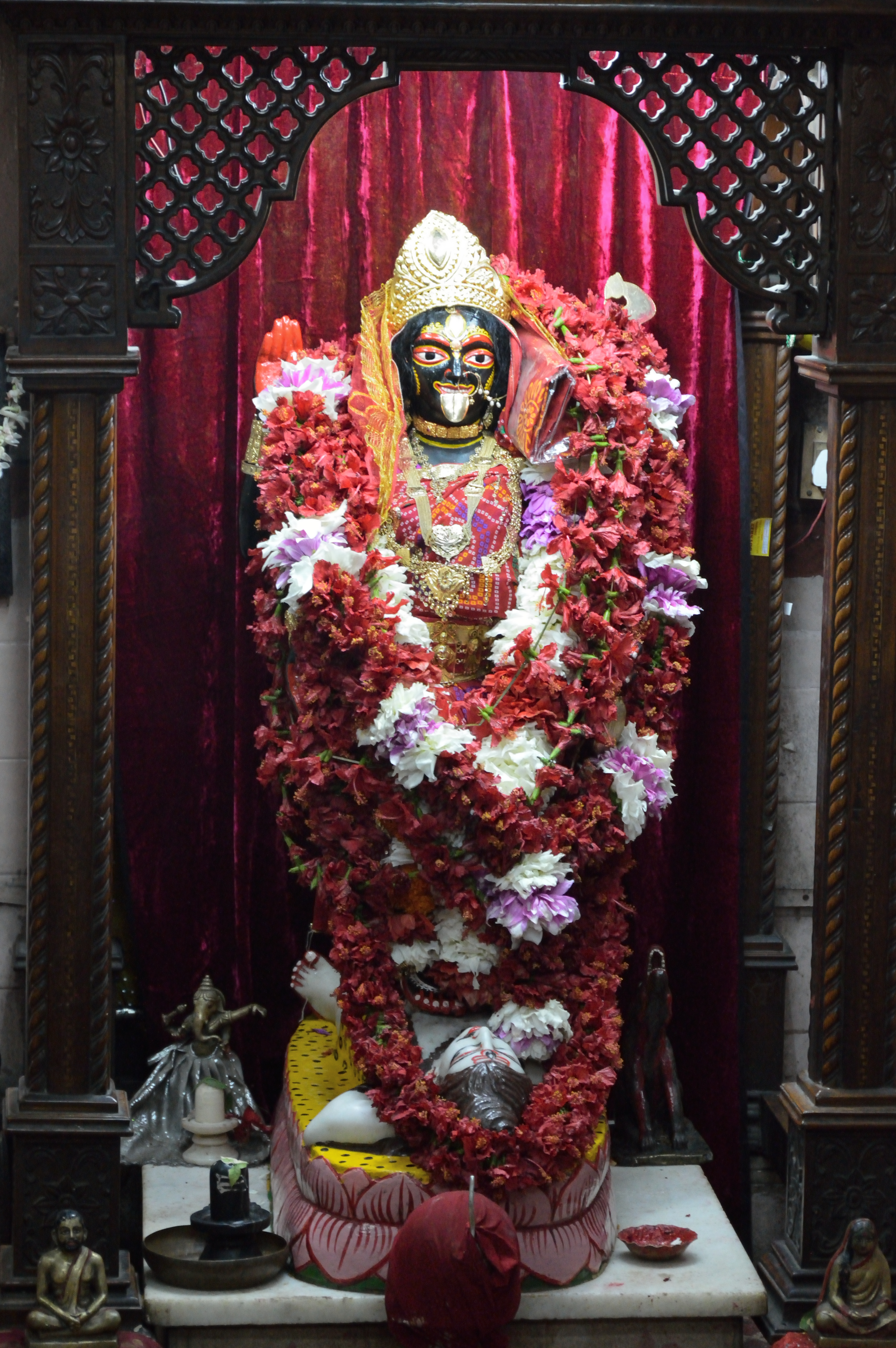
- Dakshina Kali of the Lake Kalibari

Religion
- Affiliation: Hinduism
- District: Kolkata
- Deity: Maa Kali: Kali Puja; Kaushiki Amavasya; Annapurna Puja; Durga Puja; Vishvakarma Puja

Location
- Location: Southern Avenue
- State: West Bengal
- Country: India
- Interactive map of Lake Kalibari
- Coordinates: 22.5136450°N 88.3551775°E

Lake Kalibari is a Kali temple located at Southern Avenue in Kolkata, West Bengal, India. The official name of the temple is Sree Sree 108 Karunamoyee Kalimata Mandir after the name presiding deity Karunamoyee. The temple is managed by the Sree Sri Karunamoyee Kalimata Trust. The temple is undergoing reconstruction since 2002 and is due to be completed by 2013 but due to financial issues it has still not completed.

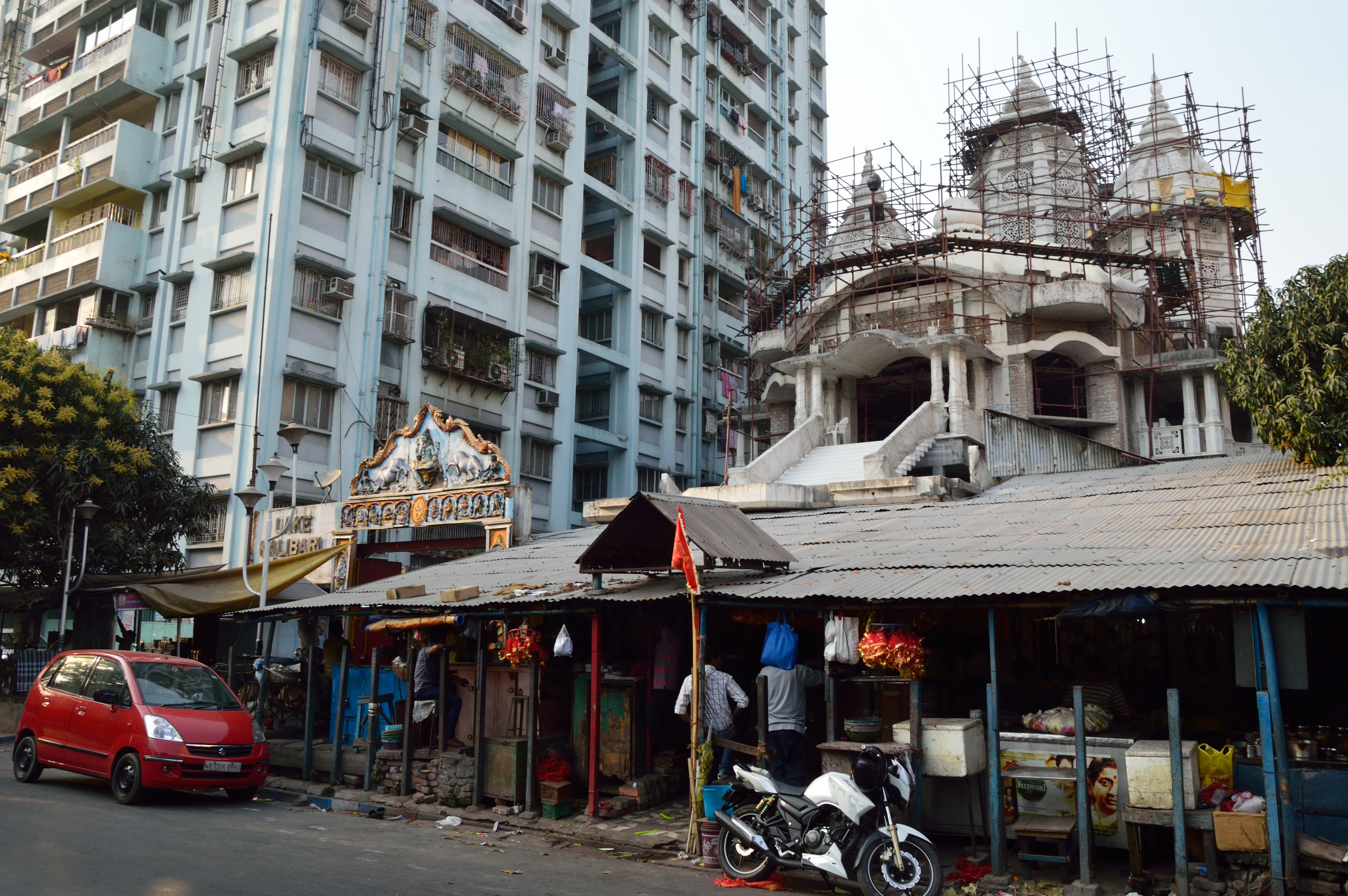
Lake Kalibari Road-side View

== History ==
The temple is dedicated to the Hindu goddess "Dakshina Kali" and she is referred to as "Karunamoyee Kali" by her devotees. Sree Sree 108 Karunamoyee Kalimata Mandir was founded by Haripada Chakraborty in 1949. He was a great devotee of Maa Kali and also a tantra sadhak. It is believed that Maa Kali gave him darshan and he established her idol in "Panchamundi ashana" after that.

When Chakraborty received swapnadesh from Maa Kali regarding establishing her idol in a new temple, he asked her, since he was poor, how will he be able to bear the cost of her puja. Maa Kali assured that she herself will take care of her puja expenditures. Initially it was a "patar kutir" and later it was reformed into a temple. The temple has undergone renovation numerous times after that. Although the name of the temple is Sree Sree 108 Karunamoyee Kalimata Mandir, it is popularly known as the Lake Kalibari due to the Rabindra Sarobar located in the vicinity of the temple.

== Deities worshipped ==
Maa Dakshinakali is the principle deity worshipped in the temple. She is called as "Maa Karunamoyee" which means that she is kind towards her devotees, who worship her with a pure heart and ask for her blessings. Devi Bagala and Santoshi Maa is also worshipped inside the temple complex. In 2020, a deity of Maa Dhumavati, the seventh of the Dashvatars, was established in the temple. As of 2020, idols of Maa Manasa and Maa Sitala will also be established in the future.
