= B. S. Dhaliwal =

Indian Army general (1947–2026)

Lieutenant General B. S. Dhaliwal PVSM AVSM VSM
- Born: 16 August 1947; Chandigarh, India
- Died: 30 May 2026 (aged 78); Chandigarh, India
- Education: National Defence Academy; National Defence College; Indira Gandhi National Open University
- Military career
- Allegiance: India
- Branch: Indian Army
- Service years: 1966–2007
- Rank: Lieutenant General
- Unit: Corps of Engineers
- Commands: 53 Engineer Regiment; Bengal Sappers; Corps of Engineers
- Awards: Param Vishisht Seva Medal; Ati Vishisht Seva Medal; Vishisht Seva Medal
- Other work: Chief Minister of Punjab Office (Technical advisor); Rowing Federation of India (Executive vice president); Yachting Association of India (Executive vice president)

Lieutenant General B. S. Dhaliwal PVSM AVSM VSM (16 August 1947 – 30 May 2026) was an Indian Army General who served as the Engineer-in-Chief at Army Headquarters from 2006 to 2007. He served in the Corps of Engineers, where he had a military career spanning about 41 years. During his service years, he also held appointments in the Military Engineering Service (MES), Border Roads Organisation (BRO), and combat engineering formations.

Following his retirement from the Indian Army in 2007, Dhaliwal served as the first Advisor (Technical/ Infrastructure) to the Chief Minister of Punjab and was associated with various engineering, infrastructure and sports organizations.

== Early life and education ==
Dhaliwal was educated at the National Defence Academy and was commissioned into the Corps of Engineers on 25 December 1966. He obtained a bachelor's degree in engineering and later earned a master's degree in human rights from the Institute of Human Rights, New Delhi. He also completed a course in disaster management from Indira Gandhi National Open University. He attended the National Defence College and became a member of several professional engineering organizations, including the Institution of Engineers, Indian Building Congress and Indian Roads Congress.

== Military career ==
Dhaliwal served in the three principal streams of the Corps of Engineers: combat engineering, military works and the Border Roads Organisation. During his career, he held appointments in the Military Engineering Service and the Border Roads Organisation, and also served as Advisor-cum-Instructor with the Indian Army Training Team in Botswana. On 1 May 2006, he assumed office as the Engineer-in-Chief at Army Headquarters, succeeding Lieutenant General Ranjith Singh. For his service, he was awarded the Param Vishisht Seva Medal, Ati Vishisht Seva Medal and Vishisht Seva Medal.

== Post-retirement activities ==
After retiring from the Army in 2007, Dhaliwal became Advisor (Technical/Infrastructure) to the Chief Minister of Punjab. In this capacity, he was involved in infrastructure, technology and policy-related advisory work for successive state governments. In 2011, he became the first Indian recipient of the Engineer of the Year Award conferred by the Federation of Engineering Institutions of Asia and the Pacific (FEIAP). He was also associated with the Yachting Association of India and the Rowing Federation of India, serving as Executive Vice President of both organizations.

== Publications ==
Dhaliwal authored The General Called Tsunami: Memoir of a Sapper, a memoir describing his military career and experiences in the Corps of Engineers.

== Death ==
Dhaliwal died from a heart attack on 30 May 2026. His death was announced by veterans' organisations and members of the Corps of Engineers community.
