= 2024 Jhansi hospital fire =

2024 Medical college fire in India

- Date: 15 November 2024
- Time: 10:30 p.m. (IST)
- Venue: Maharani Laxmi Bai Medical College
- Location: Jhansi, Uttar Pradesh, India; 25.4489°N 78.5737°E
- Cause: Electrical short circuit, possible matchstick ignition near oxygen cylinder
- Outcome: 18 deaths, 8 injuries
- Deaths: 18
- Injuries: 8
- Inquiries: Investigation ordered by CM Yogi Adityanath

On the night of 15 November 2024, a fire broke out in the Neonatal Intensive Care Unit of Maharani Laxmi Bai Medical College in Jhansi, Uttar Pradesh, resulting in the deaths of at least 18 newborns and injuring 16 others, most of which later succumbed to injuries. The incident occurred around 10:30 PM local time, as the hospital was treating an overcrowded ward with 55 infants, far exceeding its capacity of 18 beds.

== Incident ==
Initial reports suggest that the fire may have been caused by an electrical short circuit within an oxygen concentrator. Eyewitness accounts indicate that a nurse allegedly lit a matchstick while handling an oxygen cylinder, igniting the highly flammable environment of the NICU.

The rapid spread of flames and smoke led to chaotic evacuation efforts, with emergency personnel reportedly arriving approximately 30 minutes after the fire started.

== Background ==
Fires in hospitals are not an uncommon occurrence in India. In May 2024, a fire in a neonatal clinic in New Delhi killed seven newborns, while in 2011, a hospital fire in Kolkata claimed 93 lives.

According to a 2019 parliamentary report, India had only 3,377 fire stations, against the required 8,559, and a severely understaffed fire service with 55,000 personnel instead of the recommended 500,000. Similar deficits were seen in fire vehicles, with just 7,300 available out of the 33,000 needed.

== Casualties ==
Out of the 55 infants present, 44 were successfully rescued, and in those16 newborns are succumbed to burns and suffocation. Also 10 babies 10 died in the fire, among them, seven have been identified, with efforts ongoing to identify the remaining three. The injured infants are currently receiving treatment in various hospitals across Jhansi, with some in critical condition.

== Response ==
=== Government ===
Uttar Pradesh Chief Minister Yogi Adityanath expressed deep sorrow over the incident and ordered an investigation into the circumstances surrounding the fire. He announced financial aid of ₹5 lakh (approximately $6,000) for the families of each deceased infant and ₹50,000 for those injured. Deputy Chief Minister Brijesh Pathak, who also holds a health portfolio in the government, visited the site and assured families of government support. Prime Minister Narendra Modi described the Jhansi hospital fire incident as 'heartbreaking' and expressed his condolences to the victims' families.

=== Others ===
Samajwadi Party chief Akhilesh Yadav expressed deep concern over the incident. He criticized Chief Minister Yogi Adityanath, urging him to prioritize addressing the poor state of medical facilities over election campaigning. Yadav further stated that if the Yogi Adityanath-led government had strengthened the health infrastructure, the incident could have been averted.

Lok Sabha Leader of Opposition Rahul Gandhi expressed grief over the tragic incident. In a post on X, he stated, "I am deeply saddened by the news of the death and injury of several newborn children in the tragic accident at Jhansi Medical College. My deepest condolences go out to the bereaved families." Gandhi further remarked, "Such tragic incidents happening repeatedly in Uttar Pradesh raise serious questions about the negligence of the government and administration." He also called for strict action against those responsible for the incident.

West Bengal Chief Minister Mamata Banerjee on Saturday condemned the fire. She called for immediate measures to prevent such tragic incidents in the future. In a statement posted on X, she said, "I am devastated by the tragic incident at Maharani Laxmi Bai Medical College in Jhansi, where ten newborns lost their lives in a fire in the NICU. We stand in solidarity with the affected families and demand accountability and immediate action to prevent such horrific accidents."

== See also ==
- 2011 AMRI Hospital fire
