= Rabindra Sarobar =

Lake in South Kolkata, West Bengal

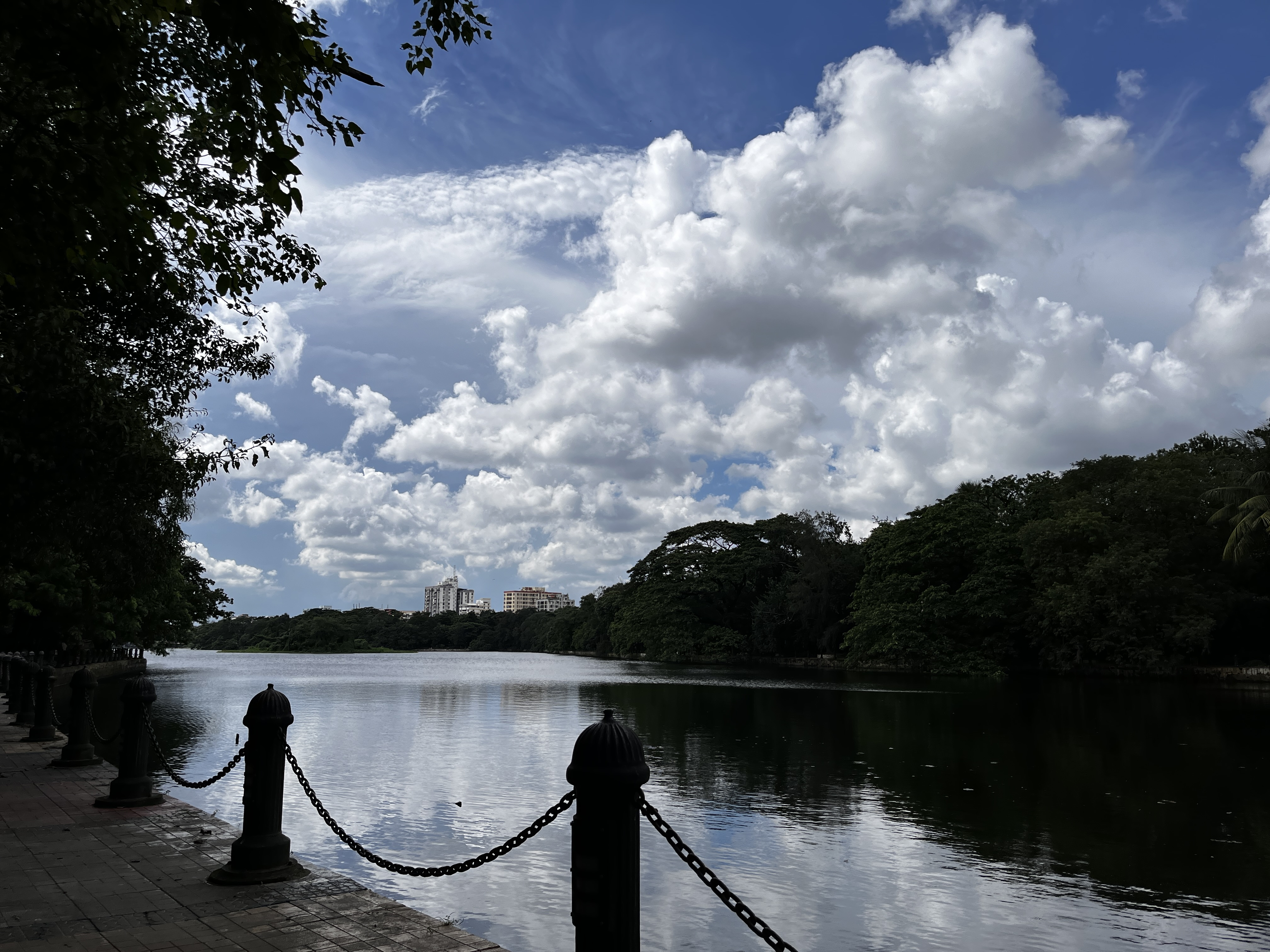
- An afternoon view at the Rabindra Sarobar Lake

- Location within Kolkata
- Location: Kolkata
- Coordinates: 22.511°N 88.360°E
- Basin countries: India

Rabindra Sarobar (formerly known as Dhakuria Lake) is an artificial lake, garden and park in South Kolkata in the Indian state of West Bengal. The name also refers to the area surrounding the lake. It is flanked by Southern Avenue to the north, Shyamaprasad Mukherjee Road to the west, Dhakuria to the east and the Kolkata Suburban Railway tracks to the south. It is named after Nobel Prize winner and poet Rabindranath Tagore.

== History ==
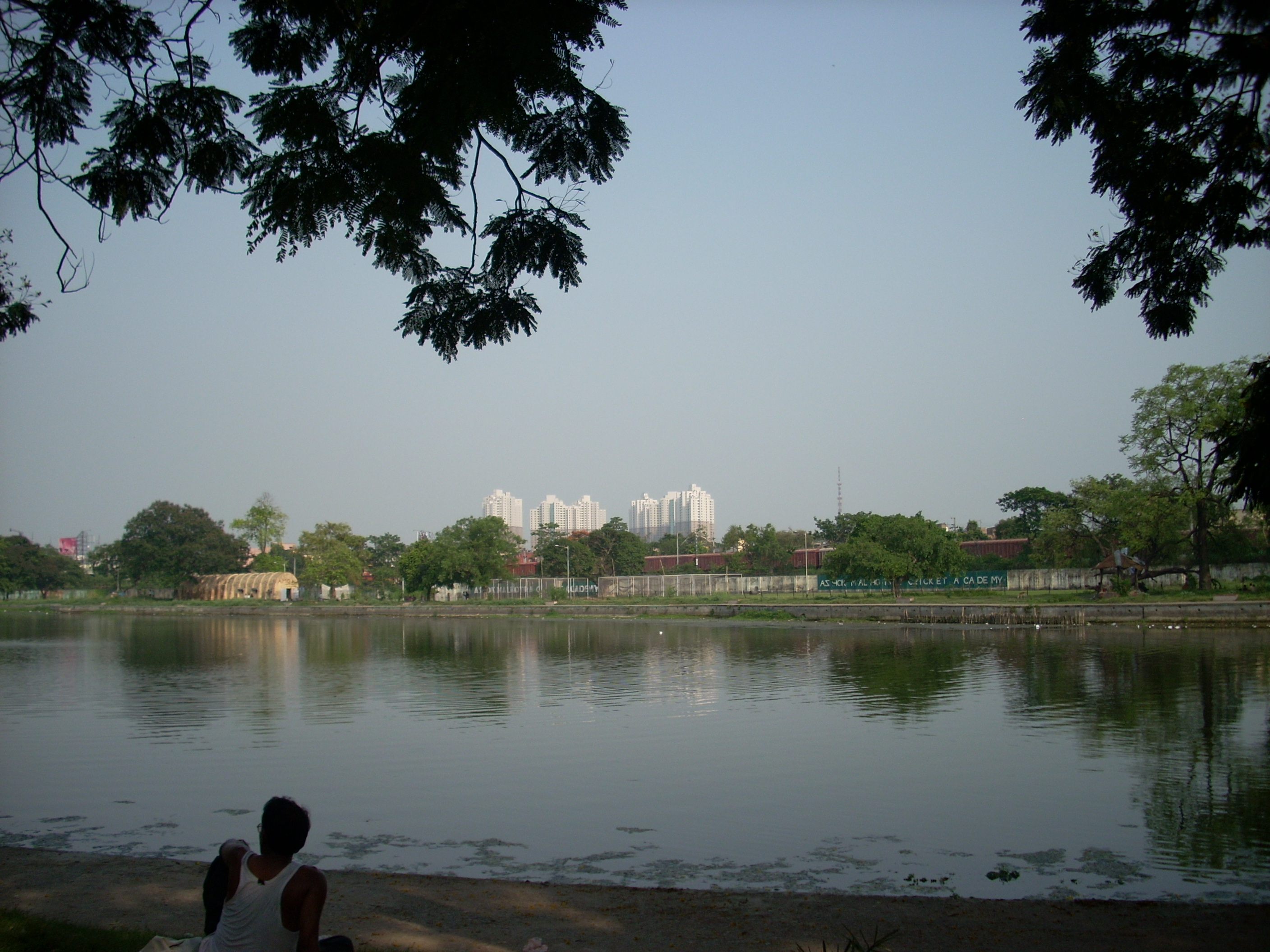
Rabindra Sarobar with a view of South City

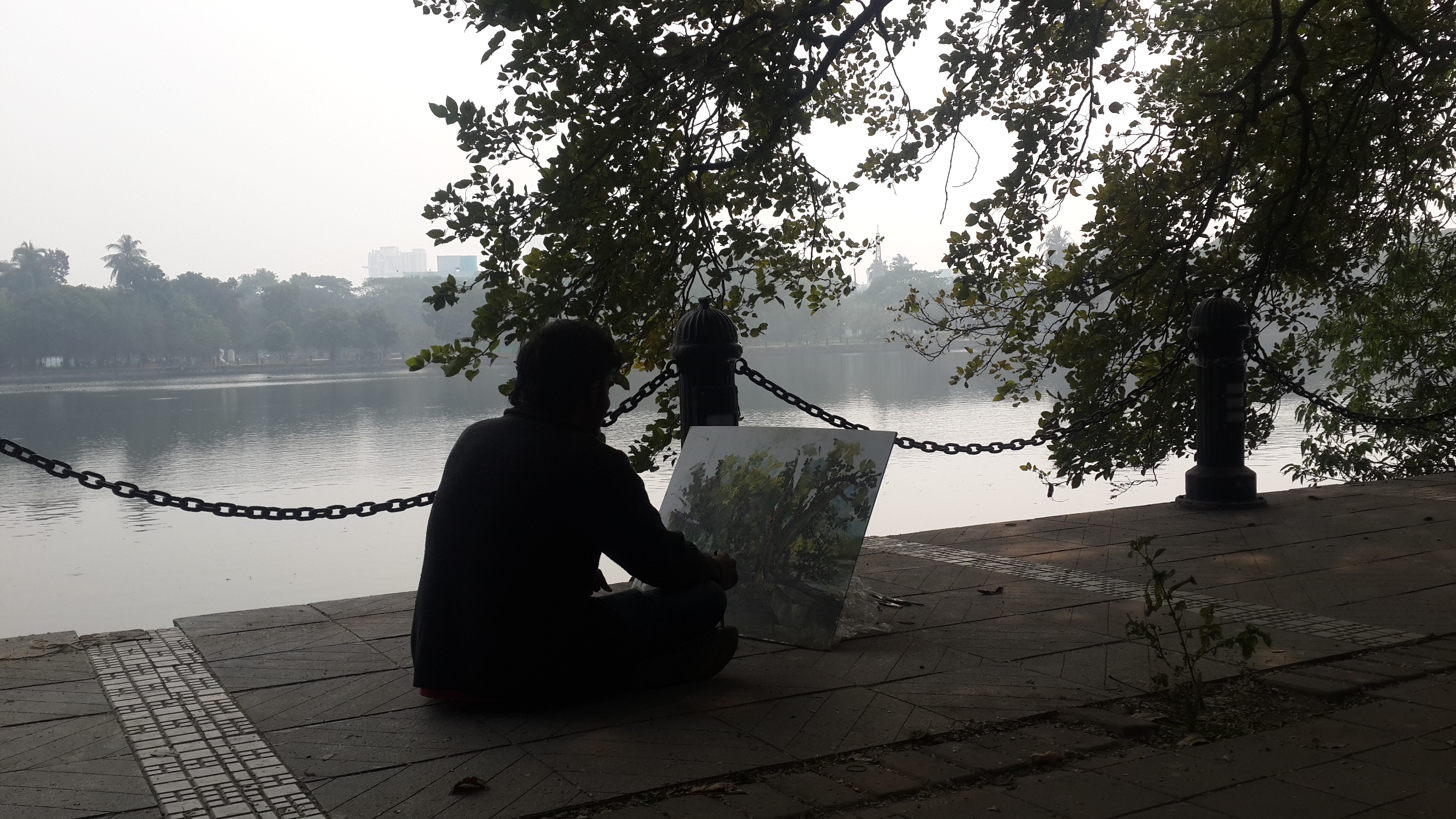
An artist draws a tree in front of the lake

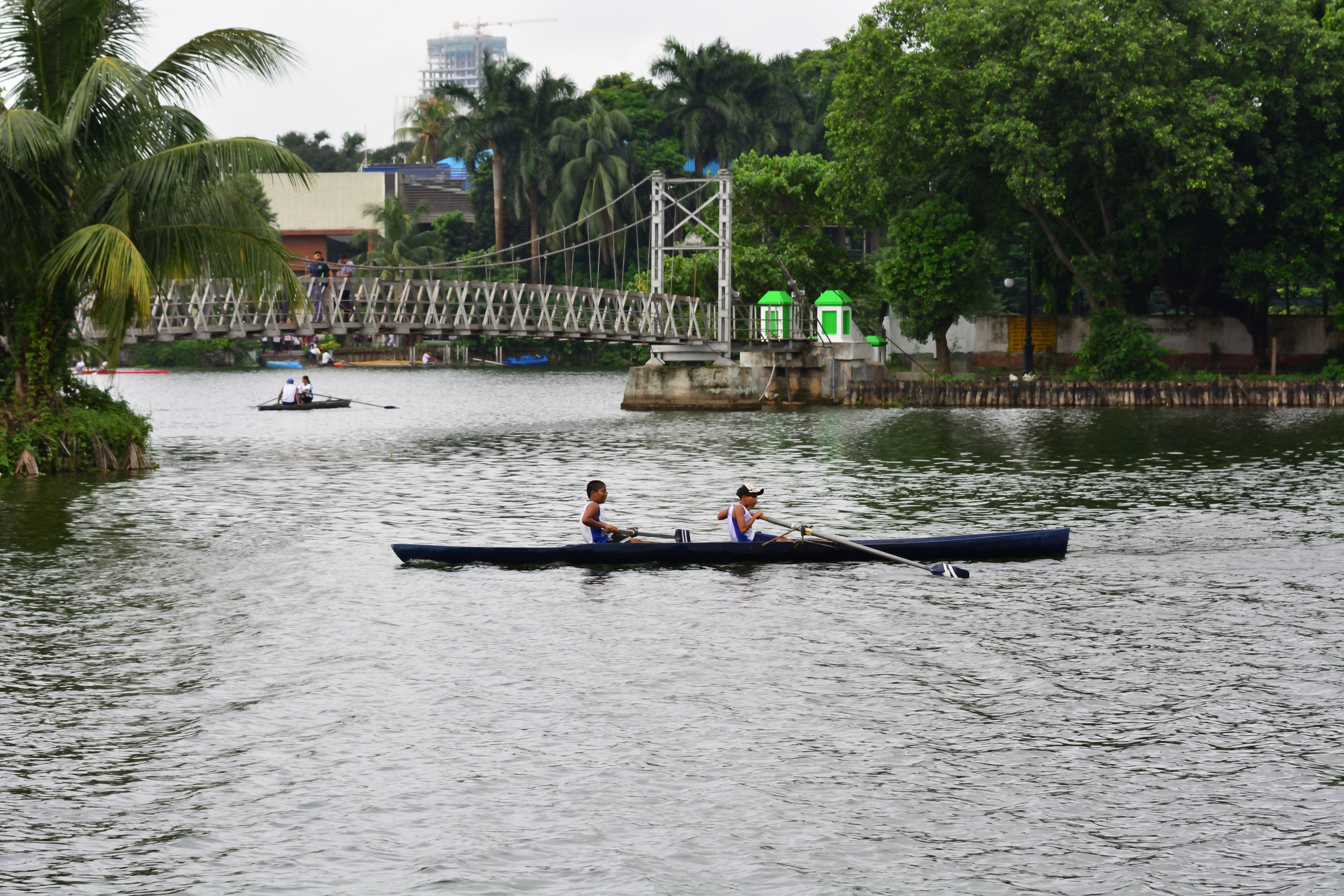
Rowing in Rabindra Sarovar Lake

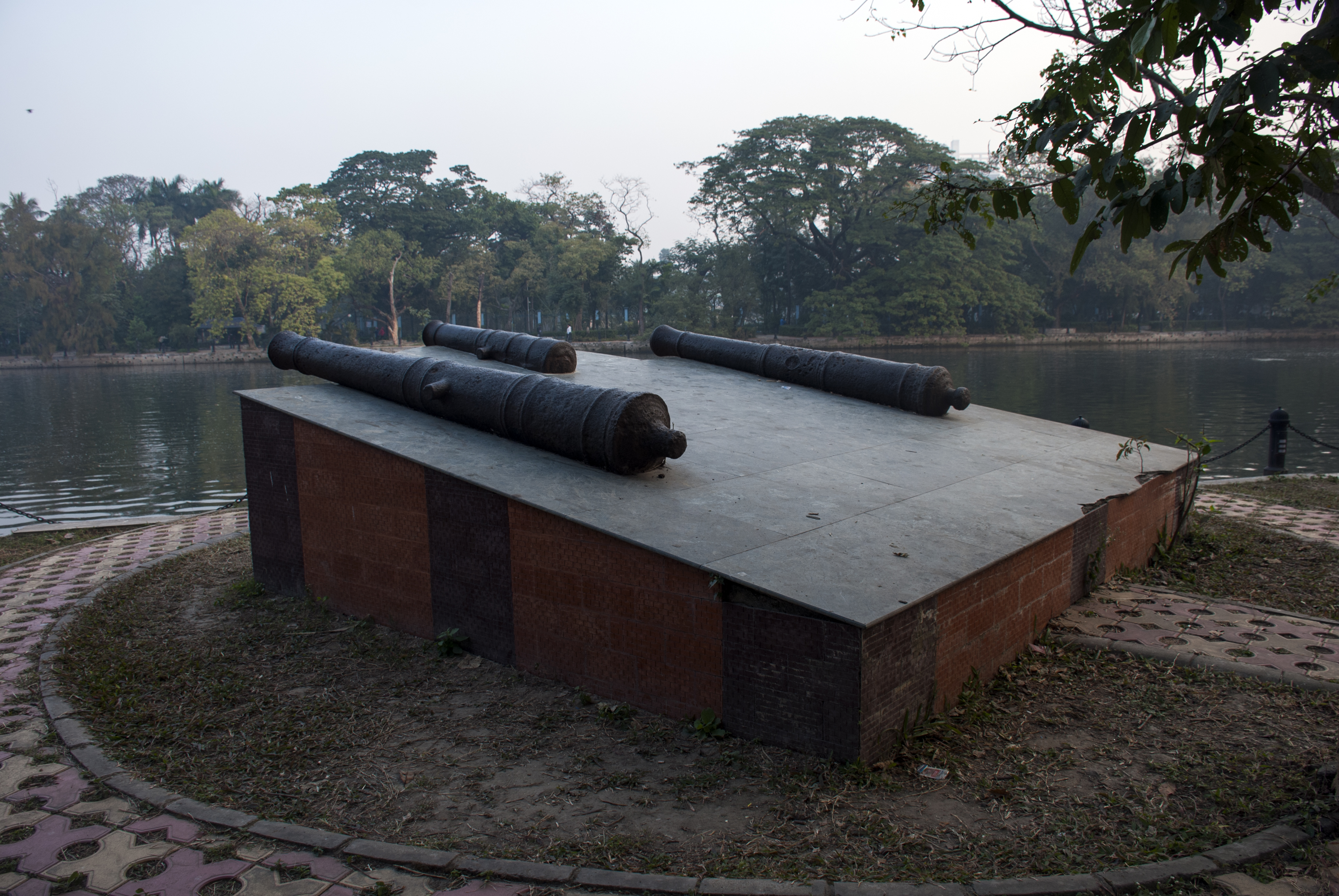
Cannons of Rabindra Sarobar

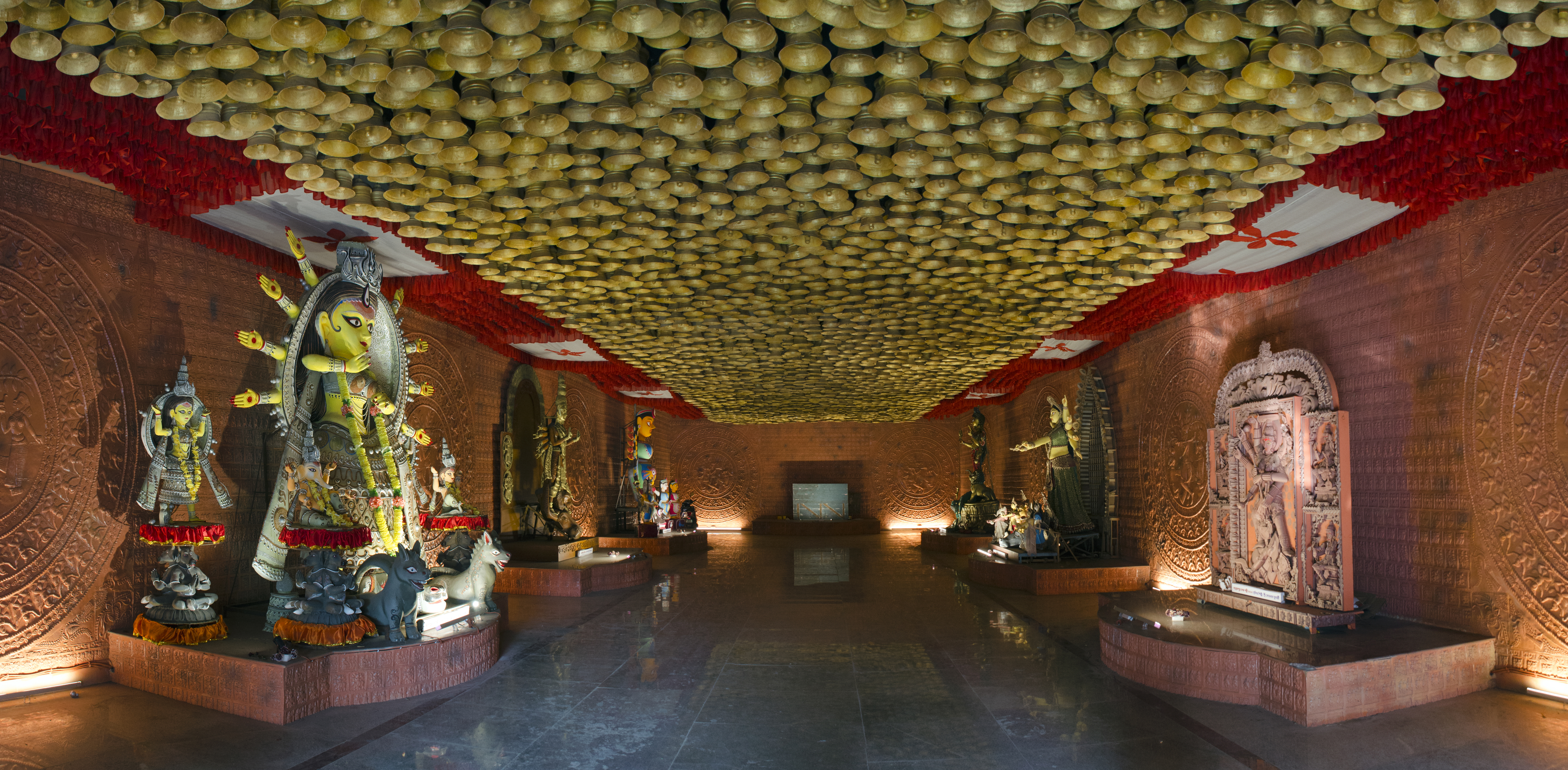
Maa Phire Elo, Durga Exhibition Museum

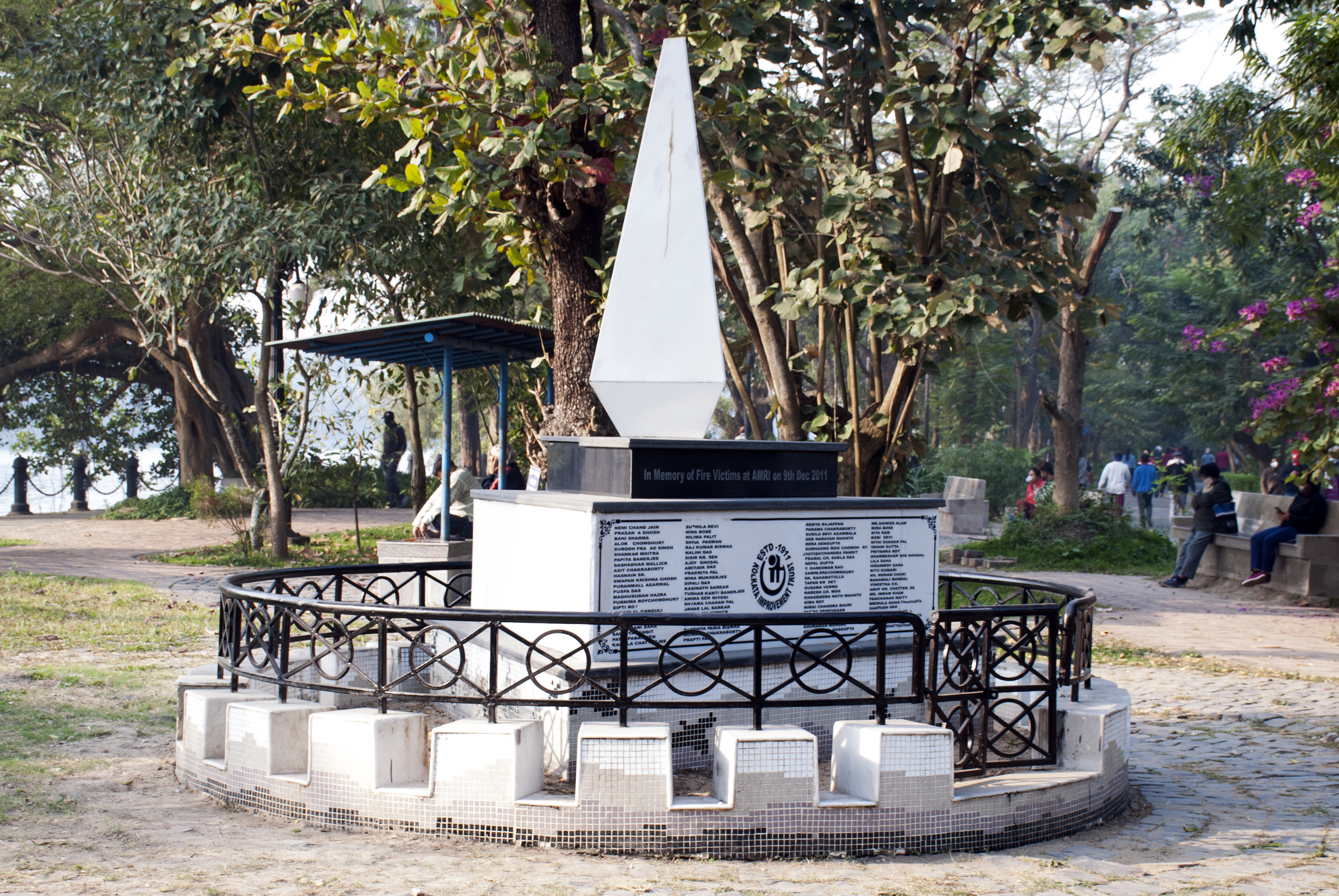
AMRI fire victim memorial

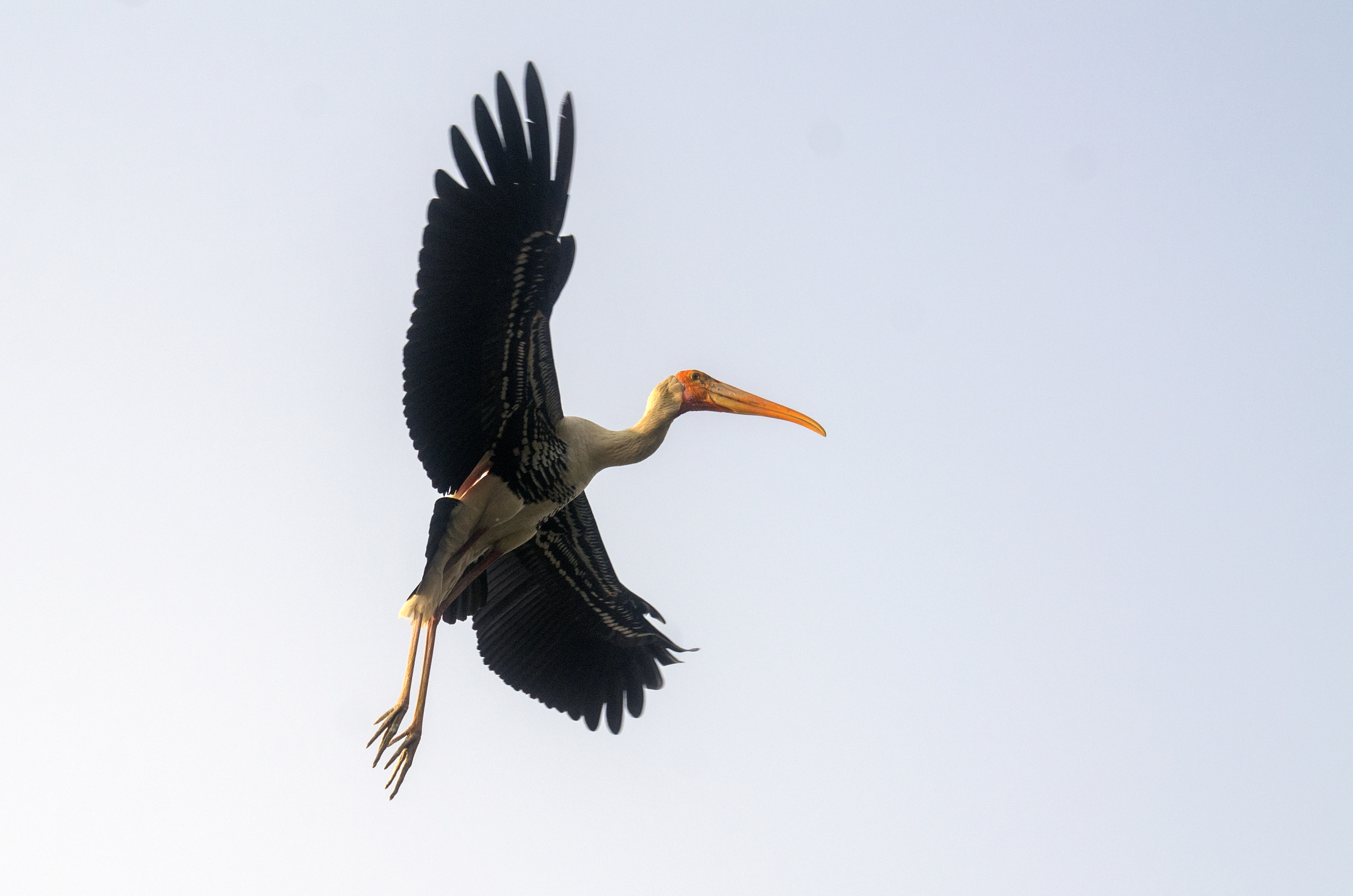
Painted stork at Rabindra Sarobar

In the early 1920s, the Calcutta Improvement Trust (CIT), a body responsible for developmental work in the Kolkata metropolitan area, acquired about 192 acres (0.78 km^{2}) of marshy jungles. Their intention was to develop the area for residential use – improving the roads, raising and levelling some of the adjacent land and building lakes and parks. Excavation work was undertaken with the plan of creating a huge lake. The excavation of the lake was led by CIT's first chairman Cecil Henry Bompass, Kolkata Municipal Corporation's chief-engineer M.R. Atkins and a young Bengali passout from Shibpur B.E. College Prabodh Chandra Chatterjee and initially it was known as Bompass Lake. Originally known as Dhakuria Lake, in May 1958, CIT renamed the lake as Rabindra Sarovar, as a tribute to Bengali writer and Nobel Laureate, Rabindranath Tagore. The area around this excavated lake was later developed to build recreational complexes, which included children's parks, gardens and auditoria.

Today the lake and its surrounding areas are one of the most popular recreational areas in Kolkata. 73 acres (300,000 m^{2}) are covered by water, while shrubs and trees, some of which are more than 100 years old, occupy the rest of the area. A partial tree census in 2012 recorded 50 different species. In the winter, one can spot some migratory birds around the lake, though the numbers are dwindling because of the rise in pollution level. The lake itself is home to many varieties of fish. Fishing is strictly prohibited. A number of people come for a walk around the lake in the mornings to enjoy the fresh air. Many visit the sunrise point to offer their prayers to the sun. During the day, it is visited by families on a picnic, tourists, young lovers and joggers.

== Landmarks ==
- Dhakuria Lake Bridge: In 1927 to commemorate the construction of the Dhakuria Lakes a plaque was installed on a small bridge called Dhakuria Lake Bridge, connecting the then Lansdown Road (renamed Sarat Bose Road) to Lilllipool, a park-cum-zoo on the Lake Gardens side of the bridge. The plaque can still be seen on the bridge.
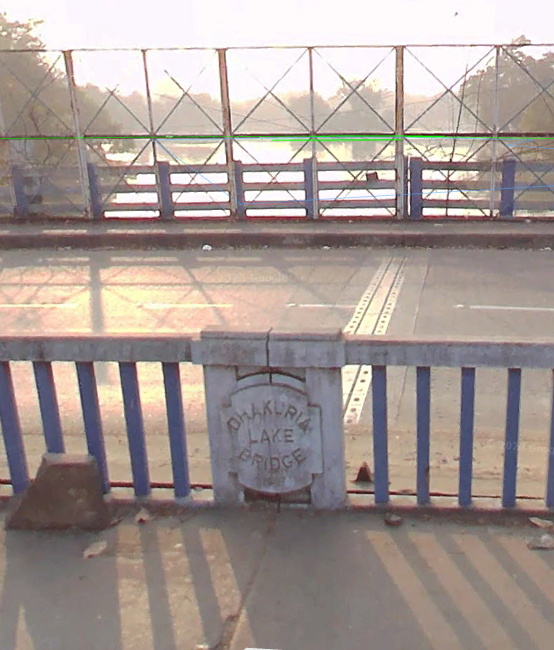
  Original Dhakuria Lake Bridge
- Durga Museum: In 2012 an abandoned waterhouse in the premises of lake turned into a museum housing several award winning Durga idols. It is run by Kolkata Improvement Trust and is officially known as the Maa Phire Elo, literally translate into return of the goddess. It is also called the called the Durga Exhibition Museum. There are three exhibits displayed outside under pavilions. The inner and outer wall of the gallwery is decorated with terracotta motifs. The gallery houses about 9 exhibits, which are replaced with new ones after the Durga puja every year.
- To the north is a football stadium, known as the Rabindra Sarobar Stadium, with a seating capacity of approximately 26,000 people. It was established in the 1950s and is today, the city's first stadium to be fully equipped with audio-visual training facilities.
- Also to the north is the open-air theatre, Mukta Mancha.
- Nazrul Mancha is situated on the northern flank near Golpark.
- The only Japanese Buddhist temple in Kolkata is located on the southern fringe of the Rabindra Sarovar. It was established in 1935 by Nichidatsu Fujii, founder of the worldwide Buddhist association, the Nipponzan Myohoji. Monks offer prayers in Japanese, to the sound of beating drums, in the early morning hours and at dusk. The temple is open to public for 3 hours each in the morning and evening when prayers are offered. Outside the main temple building there is a pillar, with a message of peace engraved in Japanese, and a pair of lions that symbolise the guardians of the faith. The Japanese refer to these figures as Komainu (lion-dog).
- There is a mosque on one of the lake's islands, which predates the excavation of the lake itself. This island is connected to the southern shore by a cable-stayed wooden (now iron) suspension bridge, which was built in 1926 and renovated in 1962. The fish sanctuary under this bridge is an additional attraction.
- There are some cannons lying on the lake's west bank that were found during the excavation in the early 1920s and retained by the CIT for beautification. It is believed that they were used by Nawab Siraj-ud-daulah, the last independent ruler of Bengal.
- The complex contains a safari garden and children's play center with a lily pool, and a swimming pool. A toy train, operational between 1985 and 1989, was a popular draw for children.
- A number of rowing and swimming clubs are situated within the Rabindra Sarovar complex. While the former are located to the north of this lake, the latter are located to its south. In 1858 the British founded the Calcutta Rowing Club (CRC), presently one of the oldest clubs in India, to promote rowing activities in Kolkata. In 1901, it got affiliated to the prestigious Amateur Rowing Association of the East (ARAE) and in 1923 signed a reciprocal arrangement deal with the London Rowing Club. The CRC has been the hub of competitive rowing in Kolkata for more than 150 years and has organised many intra- and inter-club competitions. Rowing facilities are available to members on a regular basis, from 6 am to 7:30 am and from 3:30 pm to 5 pm. The Bengal Rowing Club, Lake Club and Calcutta University Rowing Club are a few other rowing clubs located in the Rabindra Sarovar complex. One of the oldest swimming clubs in Kolkata, the Indian Life Saving Society (formerly known as Anderson Club) has its office in the lake complex.
- The lake is within walking distance of the Ramakrishna Mission Institute of Culture at Golpark.
- There is an auditorium or a hall within the Sarovar complex which adjoins the Rabindra Sarovar Stadium'. Its name is Pavilion Hall.

== Degradation ==
Like a majority of artificial lakes in the country, Rabindra Sarovar is suffering from environmental degradation. Water pollution is on the rise, owing to an increase in tourist flow and habitation around the lake. The Ministry of Environment and Forests has recently included this lake in the National Lake Conservation Plan in the hope that this will help preserve it. The local authorities have also begun an extensive tree plantation program. Dumping of garbage in the lake is the main problem of degradation of Rabindra Sarobar.

== Transport ==
Rabindra Sarovar is 30 km away from Dum Dum airport and 12 km from the Howrah railway station.

The area is served by the Rabindra Sarobar metro station of the Kolkata Metro and Lake Gardens and the Tollygunge station of the Kolkata suburban railway (Budge Budge section). It is one of the few points where the two railway systems interface (another being Dum Dum and New Garia). The area of Rabindra Sarobar is also well-connected with a bus route. Located in South Kolkata the area is properly connected and is counted as a tourist spot.

== Bio-diversity ==
The lake and the surrounding green occupy 192 acres. The water body is 73 acres while the green cover is 119 acres and supports bio-diversity.

=== Fauna ===
The region attracts a wide range of local and migratory birds. 107 species of birds were recorded in 2019, which includes 69 resident birds, 14 local migrants, 23 long distant migrants and one summer visitor have been recorded in 2019. In 2021 a total of 118 species of birds were recorded in Rabindra Sarobar. The number was 116 in 2022. In 2023 (till October) the number stood at 110. In 2023 the migratory birds have appeared early and the transit migrants are staying for a longer period. The area also has 13 species of dragonflies.

=== Flora ===
The green cover has 11,000 trees of which 7,500 are over 75 years old. The trees include palash, African tulip (rudra palash), ashok, shimul which bloom during the spring. Rabindra Sarobar is also home to a wide variety of fungi which thrive during the monsoon season. They generally grow on the dead and decaying logs. The most common fungi of Rabindra Sarobar include dead man's fingure, wine glass, bracket fungus, ink cap, split gill, puffball and many more.

== Gallery ==
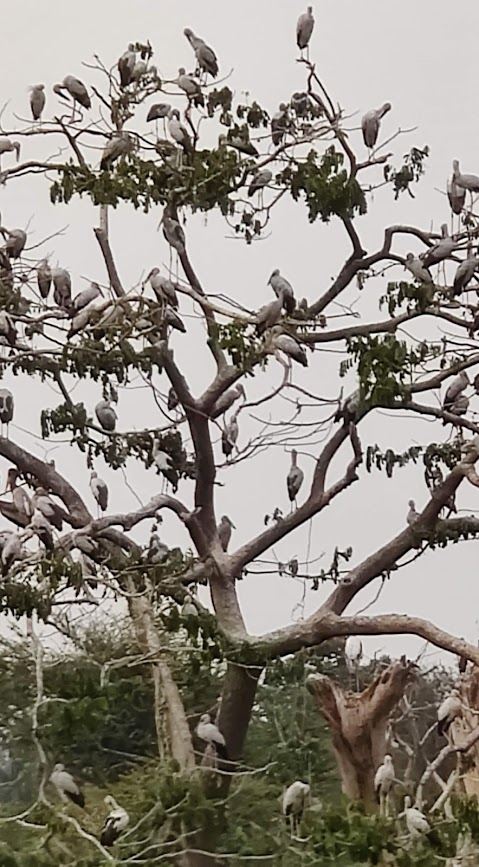
Asian open bill stork at Rabindra Sarobar

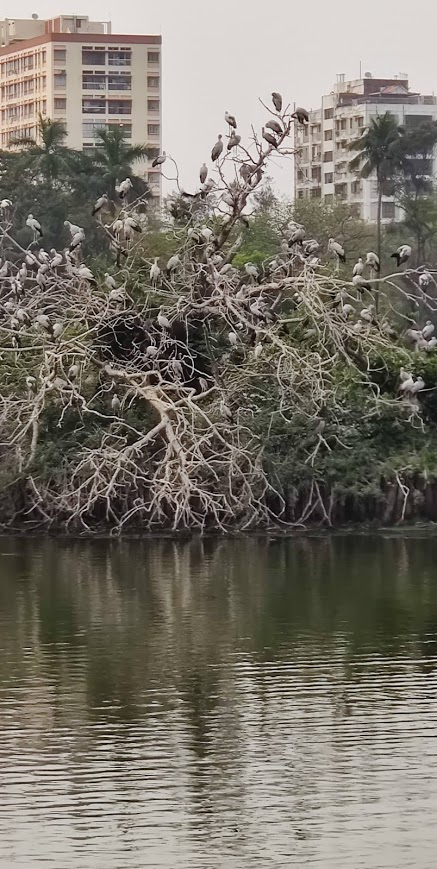
Asian open bill stork at Rabindra Sarobar

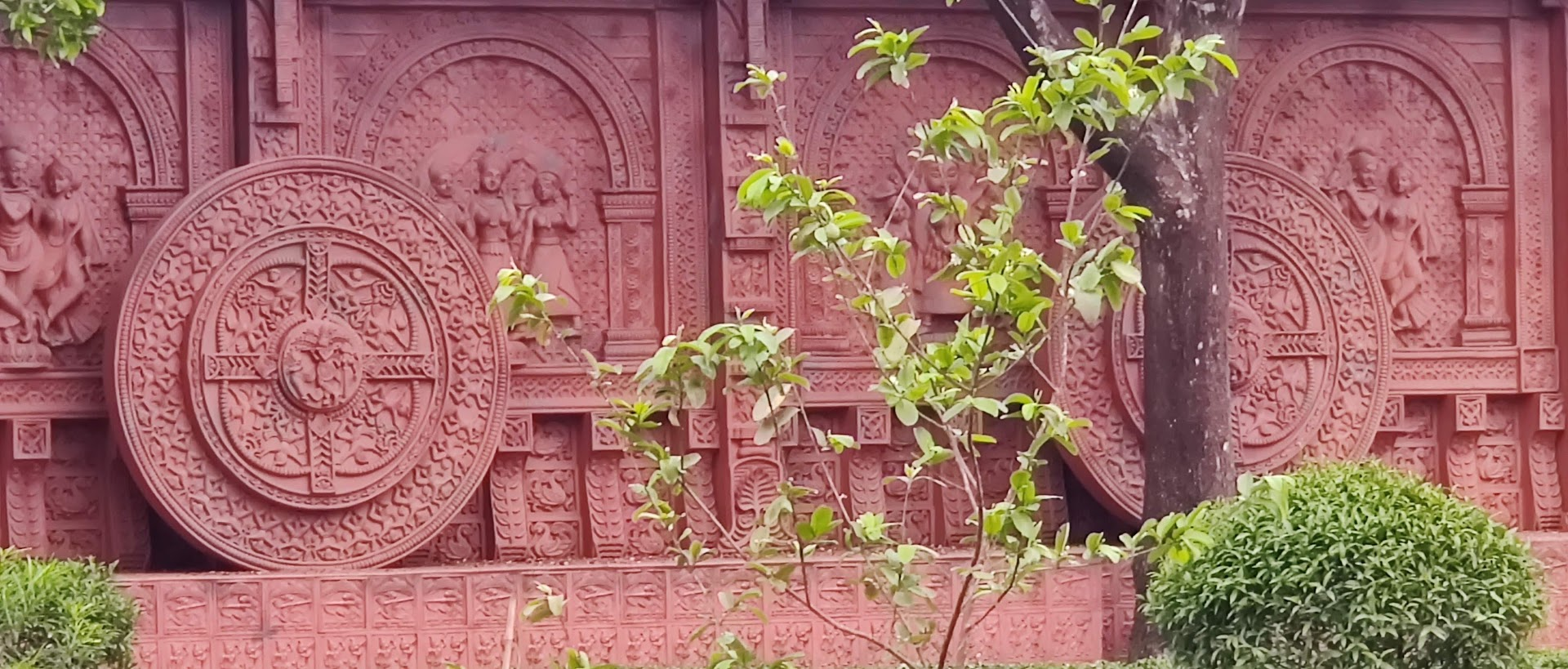
Terrcota relief at art gallery (Maa Phire Elo)

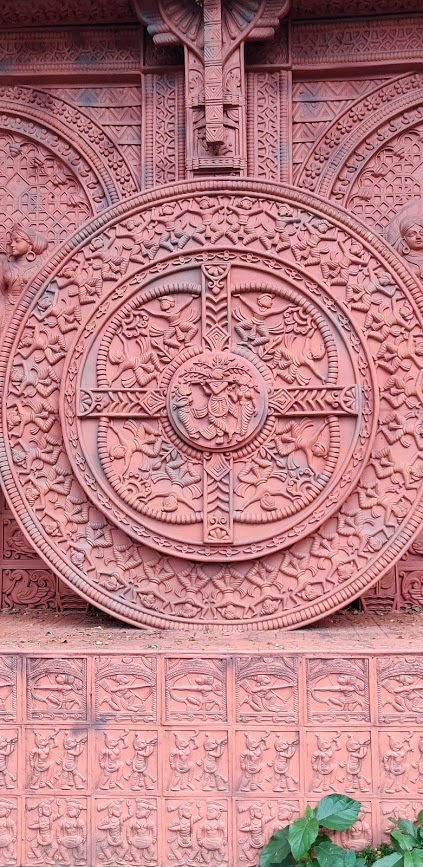
Terrcota relief at art gallery (Maa Phire Elo)

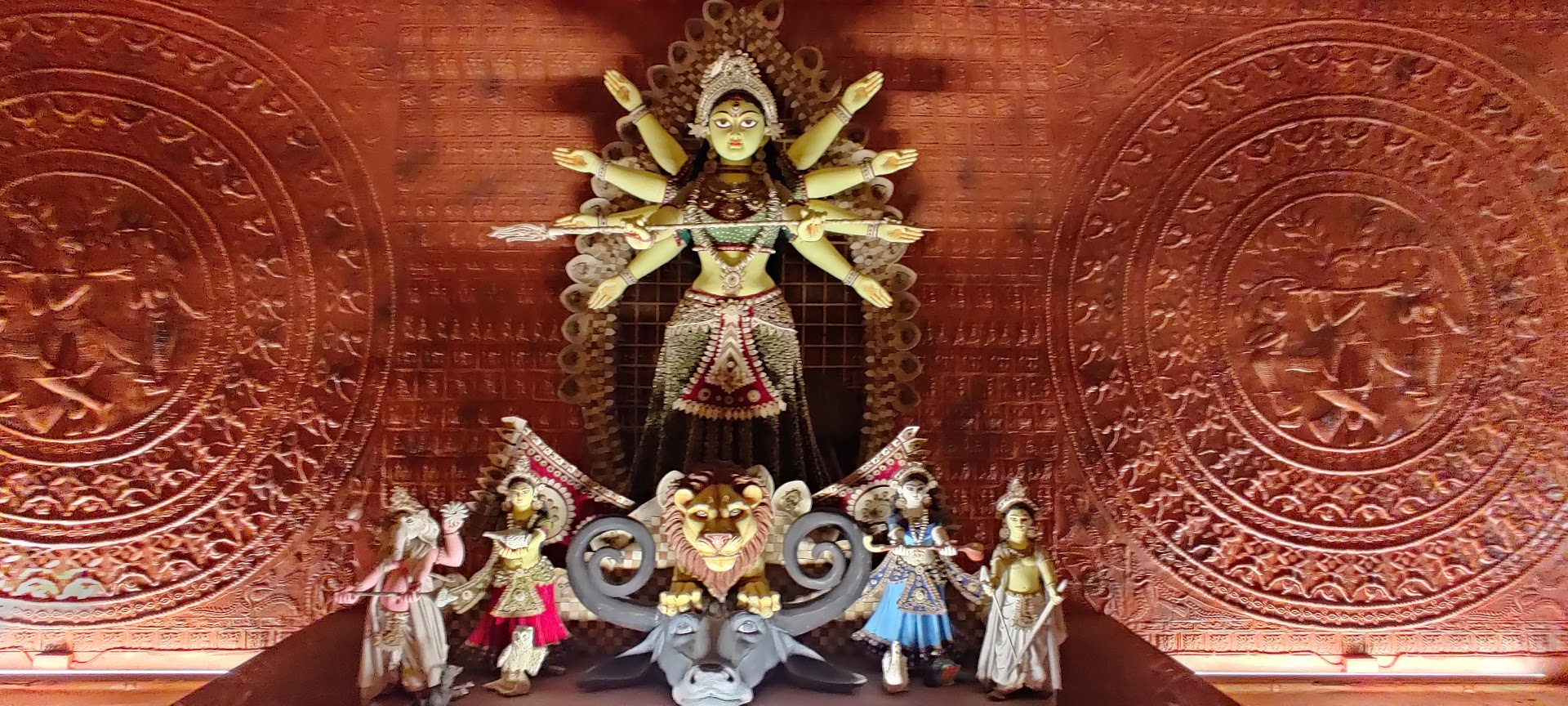
Idol of Bakul Bagan Sarbajanin, 2017, artist: Bimal Samanta, art gallery (Maa Phire Elo)

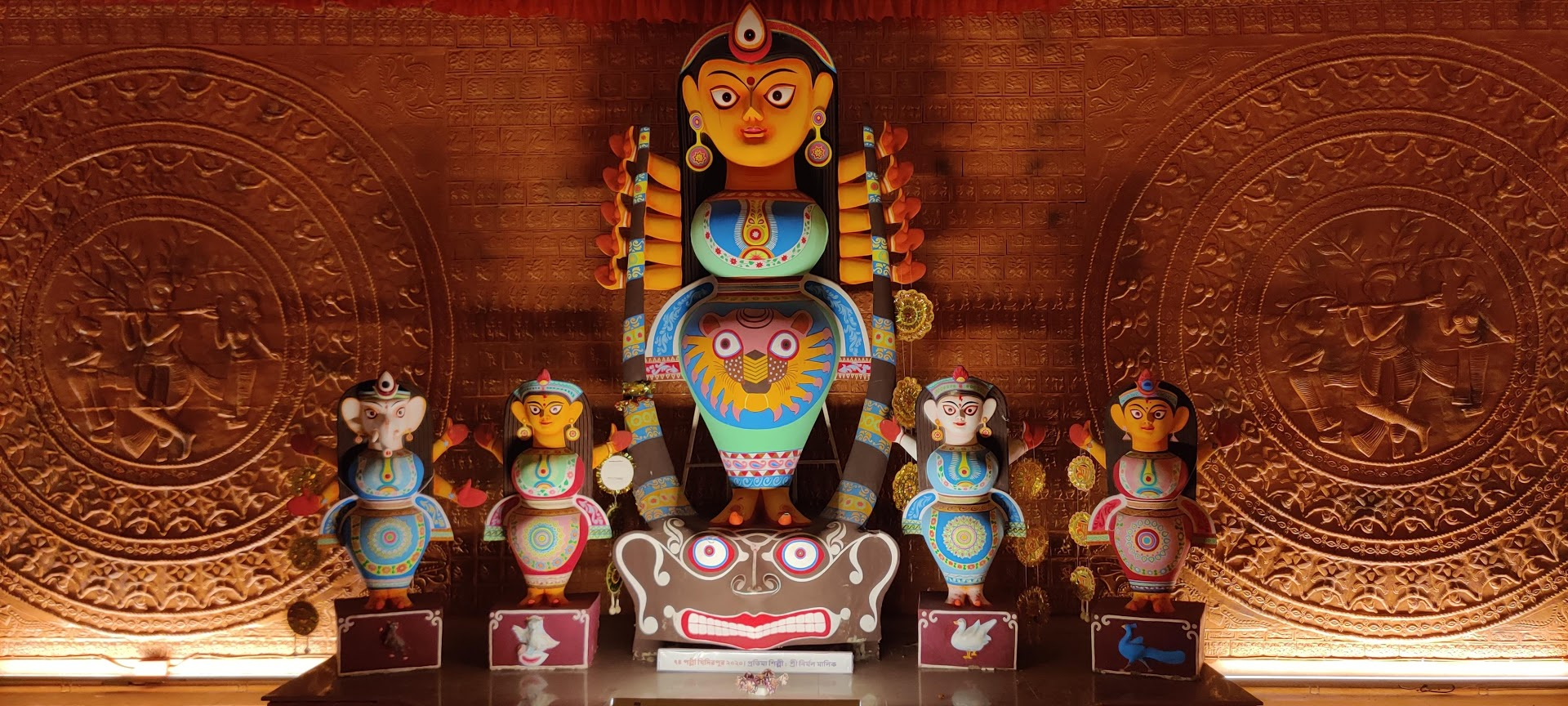
Idol of 74 Pally Khidirpur, 2020, artist: Nirmal Mullick, art gallery (Maa Phire Elo)

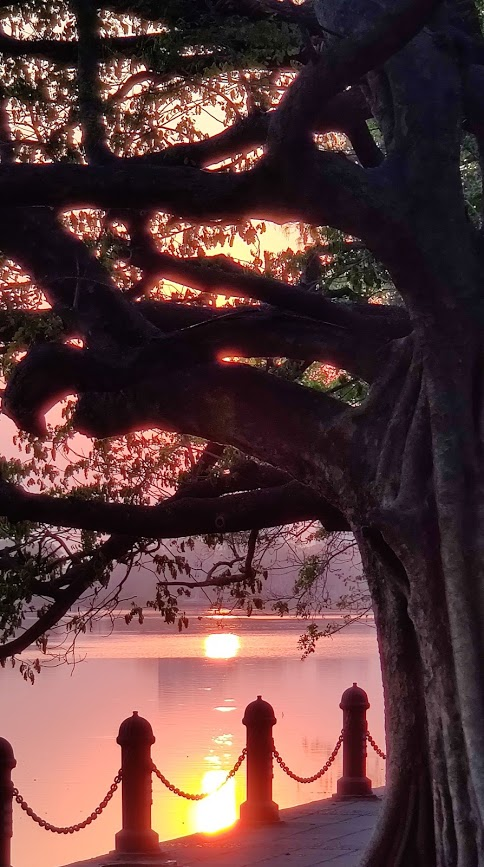
Sunset at the Rabindra Sarovar

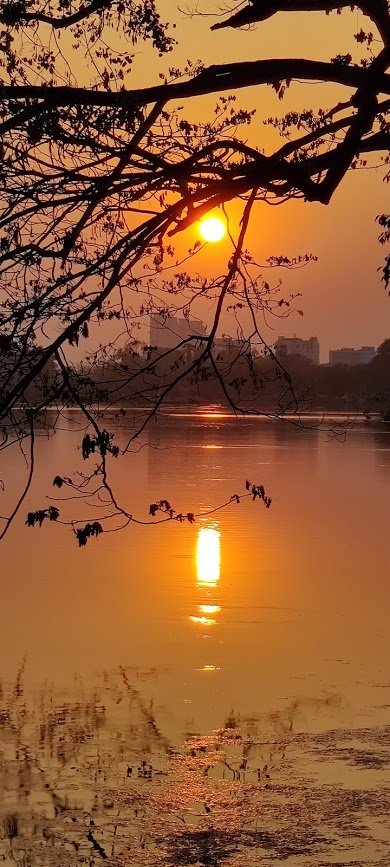
Sunset at the Rabindra Sarovar

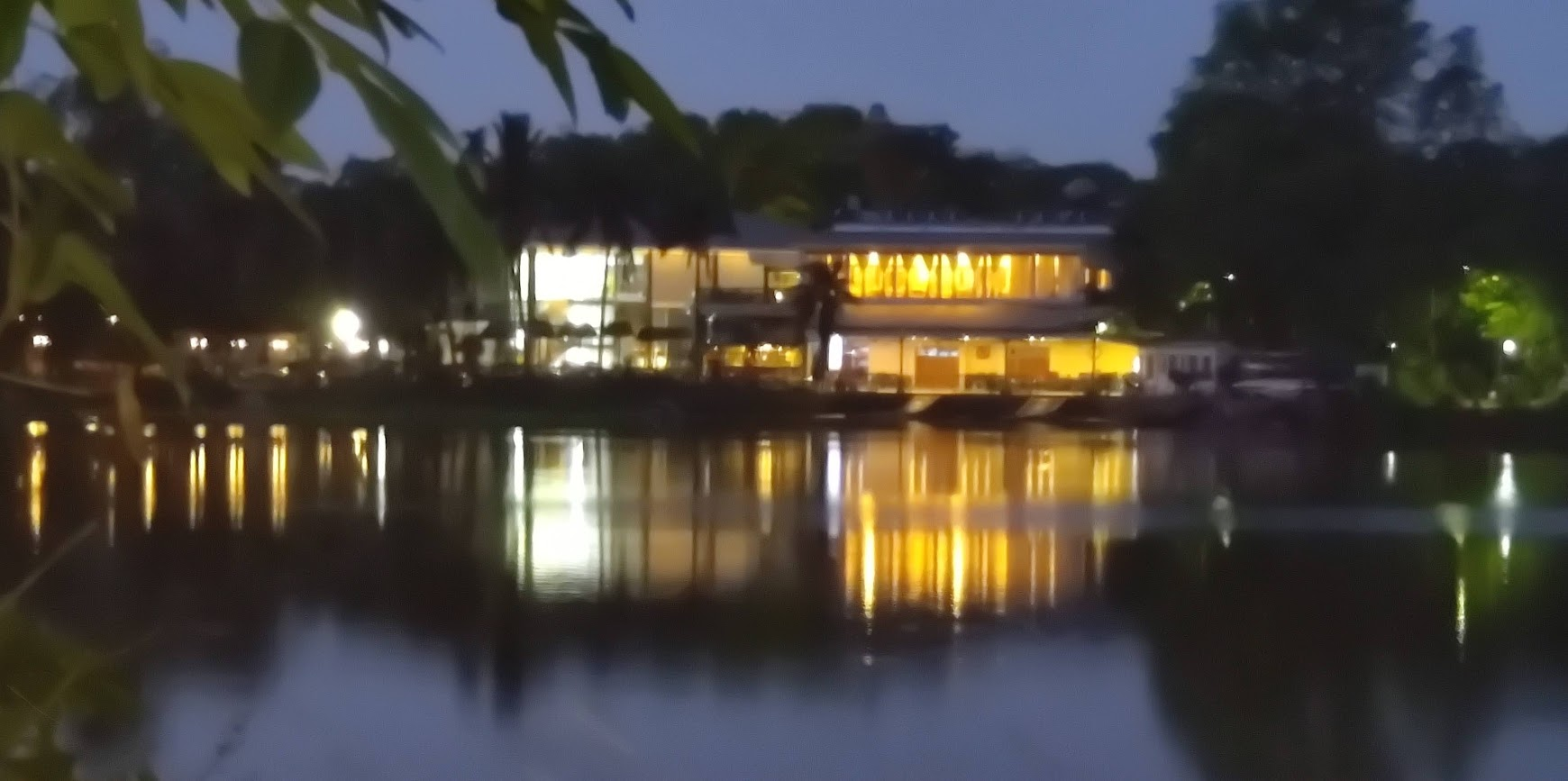
Reflections of the rowing clubs around the lake at night

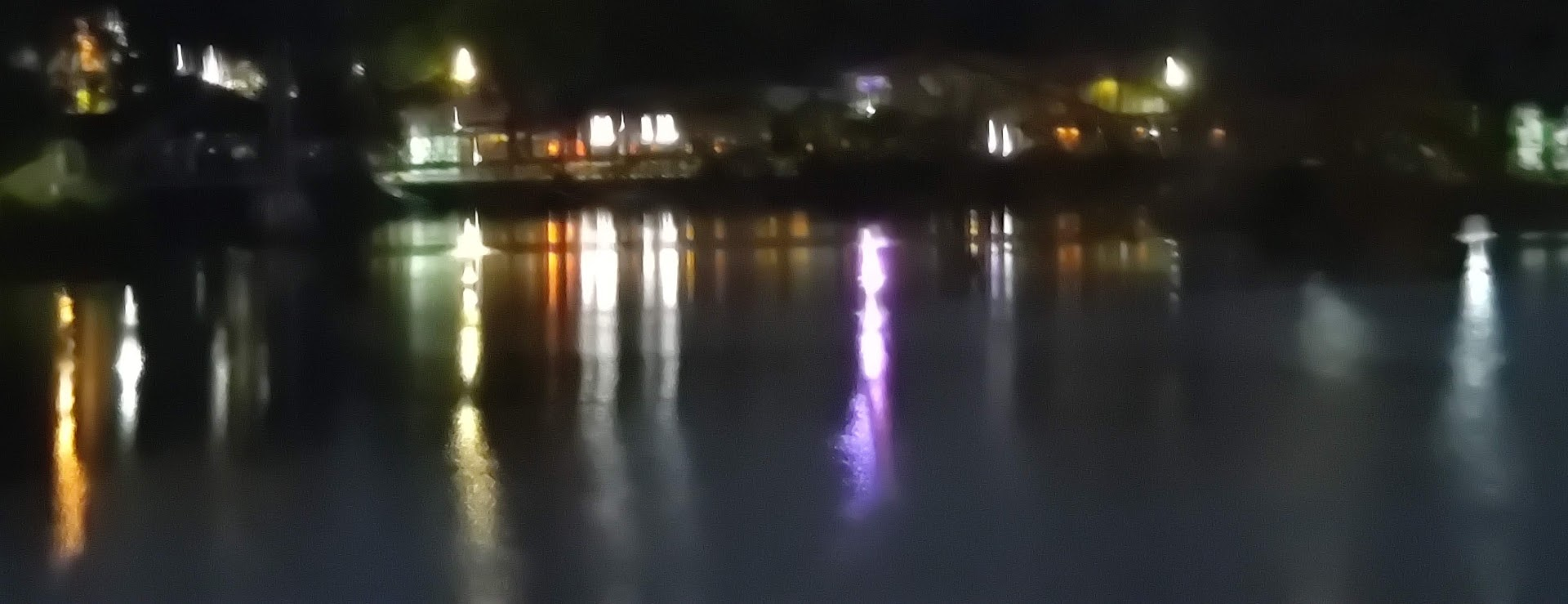
Reflections of the rowing clubs around the lake at night

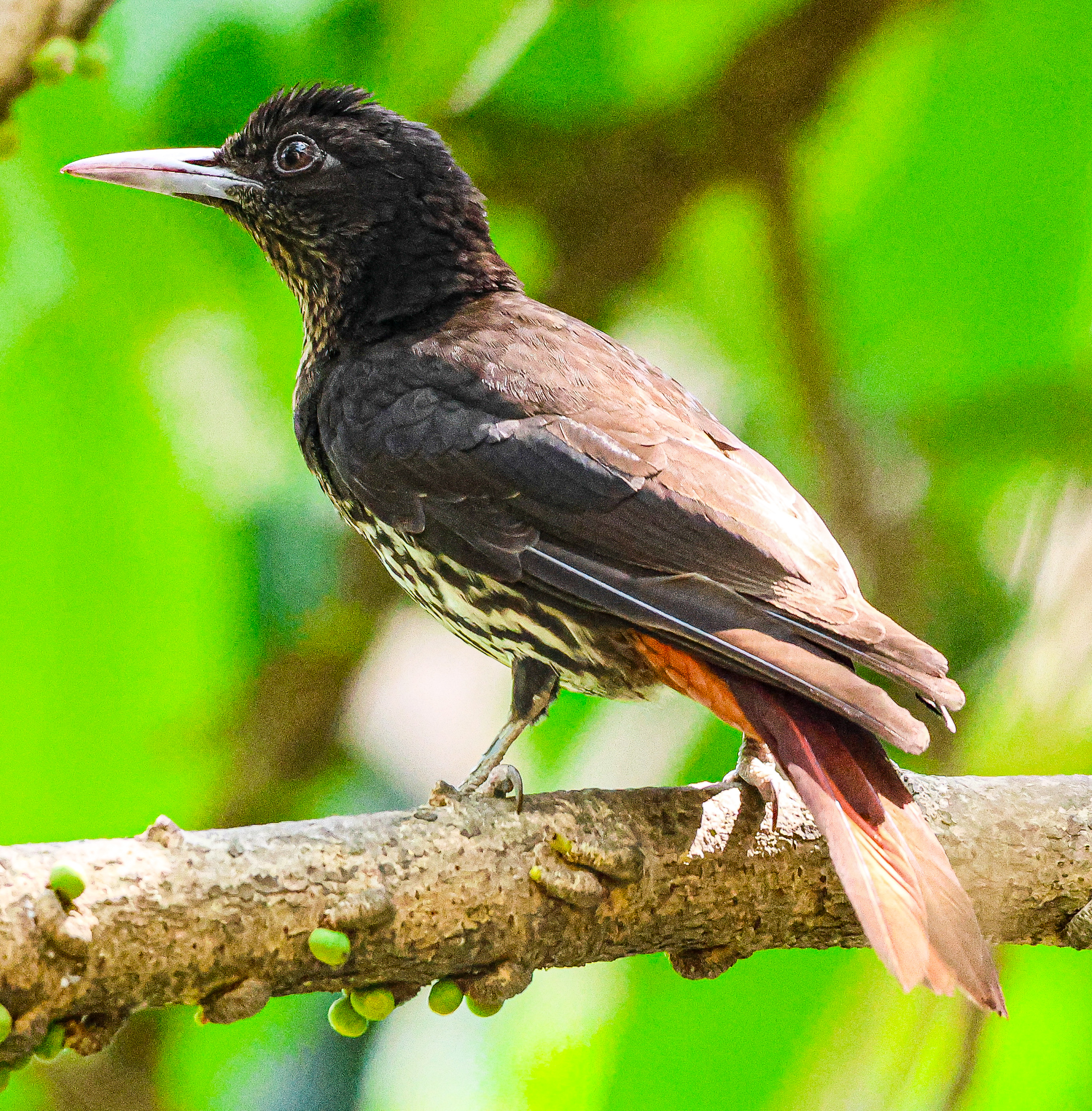
Maroon oriole Oriolus traillii rare sighting and most probably first record for Rabindra Sarobar place near Rabindra Sarobar Durga Museum

== See also ==
- Subhas Sarobar
