= Bengal Rowing Club =

Indian rowing club

Bengal Rowing Club বঙ্গীয় রোয়িং ক্লাব
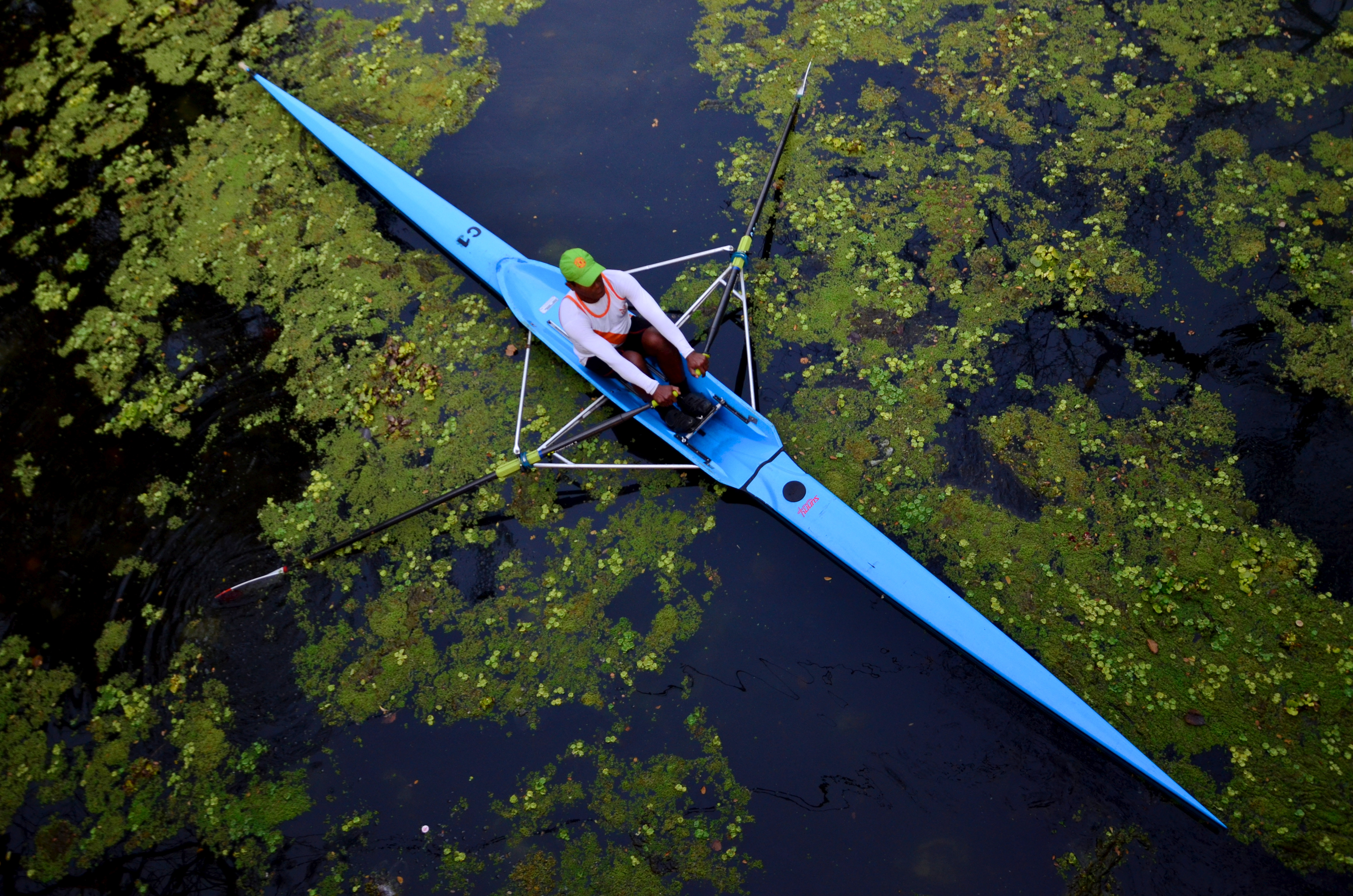
- Location: 13/2 Baroj Road, Rabindra Sarobar; Kolkata – 700029 (India) (Map)
- Home water: Rabindra Sarovar Lake
- Founded: 25 August 1929
- Former names: Marvari Rowing Club
- Key people: Raghavendra Mohta (President); Rajesh Agarwal (Captain)
- Membership: 2600 (approx)
- Affiliations: Rowing Federation of India
- Website: www.bengalrowingclub.com

Events
- BRC Students Rowing Championship; State Championships; Amateur Rowing Association Eastern Asian Championship; Intra Club Championship; Inter Club Championship; National Sub Junior Championship; National Junior Championship; National Open Championship

Notable members
- GD Birla; Sir B.D. Goenka; Lakshmi Mittal; Sourav Kothari; Brajesh Damani

The Bengal Rowing Club is a rowing club located in Kolkata, India. The club, also known as the BRC, was founded in 1929 by GD Birla on the site of a former lakeside bank.

== History ==
=== Foundation ===
The foundation stone of the Bengal Rowing Club (then Marvari Rowing Club) club was laid on 25 August 1929. It took 6 years to finish constructions and finalise arrangements. The sports club was opened to its members in 1935. The club came to notice for its casual attire rules and intake of women members, which was in stark contrast to some of the other British clubs around the city. This was a sign of Indians uniting to non-cooperate with British Raj] rules and establish their own rules.

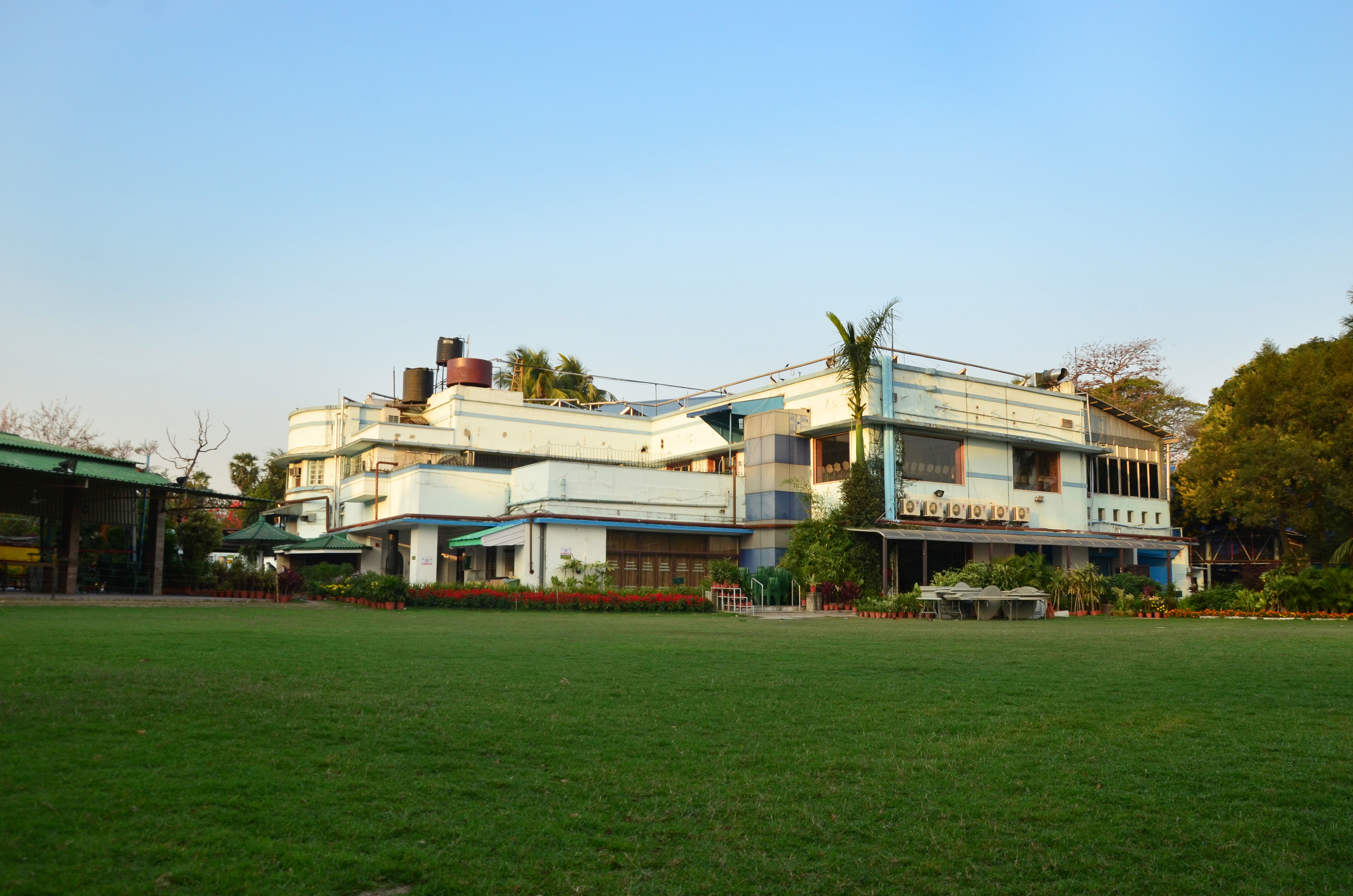
A view of the club building from the lawn.

== Sports ==
Rowing is the primary sport of the club. Several championships are organised throughout the year. These include:

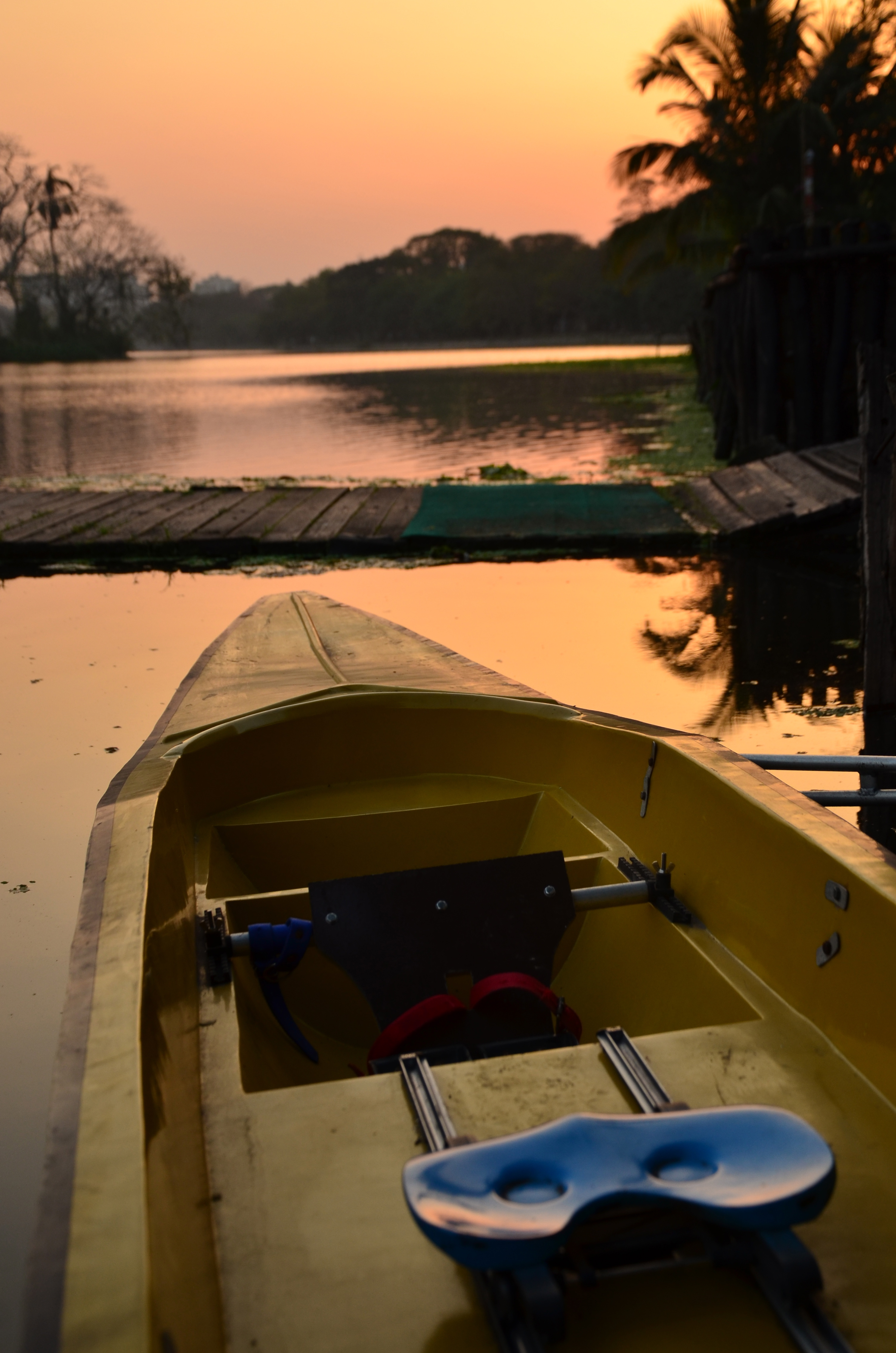
A club boat.

- BRC Students Rowing Championship is the biggest sporting event of the club. It is organised annually in mid-May. The participants in the event are students from 50 of the finest schools in Kolkata. The championship is organised in several categories, which include 'Junior Girls, Fours’, 'Senior Girls, Fours', 'Junior Boys, Fours' and 'Senior Boys, Fours'. There is a total of Rs. 1 Lac at stake for the winners. This event was started in 2000, and the objective of the event is to introduce the sport to the youth and encourage them to take it up in their daily lives.
- Intra Club Championship is a regatta where rowers of the club compete against each other.
- Inter Club Championship is a city-wide championship, all clubs of the Rabindra Sarovor lake row down the lanes to prove their metal and be titled Head of the Lake.' The participating clubs include the Lake Club, Calcutta Rowing Club, Calcutta University Rowing Club and hosts, BRC. This is generally organised in the month of December or January.
- State Championships have been organised several times by the club. It is a championship where all rowing clubs of the state of West Bengal race against each other. The course is a 1000 m stretch and has two lanes. The south lane is called Tolly, and the north lane is called Calcutta.
- National Sub Junior Championship, Is the countrywide completion for under rowers under the age of 16. Rowers of different states race against each other to win gold, silver and bronze metals. It was organised by the club once in 2011
- Amateur Rowing Association Eastern Asian Championship was organised by the club in BRC in 2004. Boat club members from all across East Asia participated in the event.
