= Maharani Laxmi Bai Medical College =

Medical college located in Jhansi, Uttar Pradesh, India

- Type: State Medical College
- Established: 1968; 58 years ago
- Affiliations: National Medical Commission
- Academic affiliations: Atal Bihari Vajpayee Medical University
- Principal: Dr. Sudhir Kumar
- Undergraduates: 150
- Location: Jhansi, Uttar Pradesh, India; 25.459044°N 78.615934°E
- Campus: Urban
- Website: www.mlbmcj.edu.in

Maharani Laxmi Bai Medical College (MLBMC) or MLB Medical College is a state-run medical college located in Jhansi, Uttar Pradesh, India, and one of the largest government-run hospitals in the Bundelkhand region of Uttar Pradesh. The college is affiliated to Atal Bihari Vajpayee Medical University. It is named after Maharani Lakshmi Bai of Jhansi. It provides medical care to people of Bundelkhand region. The college building spread over a walled area of 380 acres and this is one of the biggest medical college campus in the country.

== Courses ==
The following courses are taught:

- Bachelor of Medicine Bachelor of Surgery, MBBS
- Medicinae Doctor, MD (in various courses)
- Master of Surgery, MS (in various courses)

== Admission ==
For 150 seats in MBBS course NEET UG entrance exam held every year, in which college offer 15% seats via All India Quota and 85% seats via State Quota

For postgraduate courses NEET PG is the qualifying exam to secure a seat.

Entry to this institute is highly competitive, with admission offered to less than top 1% of applicants. The medical college entrance examination for MLBMC is through NEET exam in India.

== Facilities ==
- Library - The college library is situated on the first floor in the teaching block, having a capacity of 150 readers. There are 10,147 books and 5,600 back volumes of journals. The library is receiving about 85 Indian/ foreign journals currently. Library has microfilm reader/reprography equipment. Recently has established a Cyber Unit with Internet linkage. The library is open for students from 11:00 am to 7:00 pm on working days. Graduate students can study books in the library only. Damaging books or tearing them is a serious act of indiscipline and shall be punished. There's also a well established reading room with air conditioning, coffee machines and heaters.
- Hostel - The college has following hostels for its undergraduate and postgraduate students. Dr. C V Raman Hostel - Under Graduate boys’ hostel Dhanwantari Hostel - Under Graduate boys’ hostel Senior Boys Hostel - Post Graduate boys hostel Girls Hostel - Under Graduate girl's hostel P.G. Girls Hostel - Post Graduate girls hostel each with their own canteens and mess.
- Sports Ground

Each hostel has badminton courts and gardens and volley ball court as well.

- Auditorium - Auditorium is provided to students for conducting different Cultural events, Seminars etc.

== Upgradation ==
The Government of India has decided to upgrade the institute on lines of All India Institute of Medical Sciences as part of phase-3 of Pradhan Mantri Swasthya Suraksha Yojana (PMSSY) whereby the Central Government will bear 80% of the cost of up gradation, and 20% cost will be borne by State Government.

== Super Speciality Block ==
Super speciality block as a part of upgradation will pave the pathway for various super-speciality courses in this college.

== E-Hospital ==
Maharani Laxmibai Medical College has started the exercise of E-Hospital on the lines of SGPGIMS Lucknow. After this the patients will get all the facilities online, which will save patients time. The doctor will also be able to see the patient's full record on the computer. After that the entire work related to treatment will start online. Besides the registration, the inquiry report will also be available online. Details of patients associated with other departments, including wards, ICU, operation theatre, will be available online. On the basis of UID, in cases of complex diseases, doctors will be able to advise them by looking at the online report. If operation is required, then patients will get an automatic generated number online.

== Fire incident ==
On the night of November 15, 2024, a fire broke out in the Neonatal intensive care unit of Maharani Laxmi Bai Medical College in Jhansi. The fire resulted in the deaths of at least 10 newborns and injured 16 others. At the time of the incident, the NICU was overcrowded with 55 infants, well beyond its capacity of 18 beds. Initial investigations suggest that the fire may have been caused by an electrical short circuit or mishandling of oxygen equipment. In response, Uttar Pradesh Chief Minister Yogi Adityanath announced an ex gratia payment of ₹5 lakh to the families of the deceased and ₹50,000 to the injured.

== See also ==
- 2024 Jhansi hospital fire
