= 2011 AMRI Hospital fire =

Hospital fire incident

Coordinates: 22°30′45.46″N 88°21′55.60″E

The 2011 AMRI Hospital fire was a major fire at a private hospital in Dhakuria, Kolkata, that occurred in the early morning of 9 December 2011. The hospital is part of a private hospital chain owned by the Emami & Sarachi group, known as AMRI Hospitals. The fire claimed 89 victims and was thought to have been caused by a short circuit in the basement. The spread of the fire was aided by the illegal storage of flammable material in the basement of the hospital. After the incident the directors of the hospital were taken into custody. They were said to have caused the fire due to inattention of the hospital staff, workers, cleaners, and nurses.

== Incident ==
According to eyewitnesses, it was reported that at around 3:30 a.m. smoke was seen coming out of the basement of the building. There were 160 patients at the time of the incident, of which around 50 were in the ICU. By noon, the death tally reached 55.

== Repercussions ==
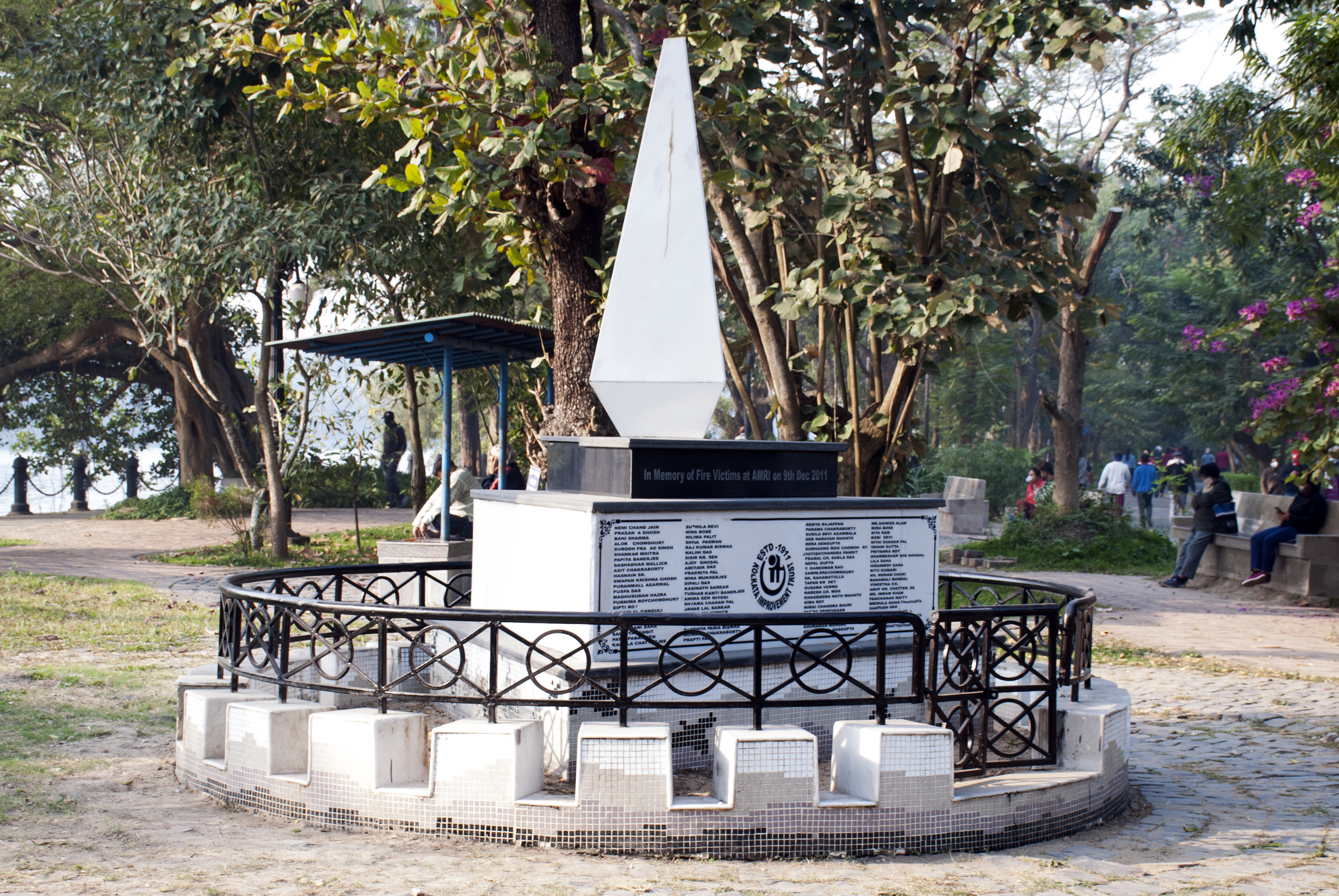
AMRI fire victim memorial, Rabindra Sarobar

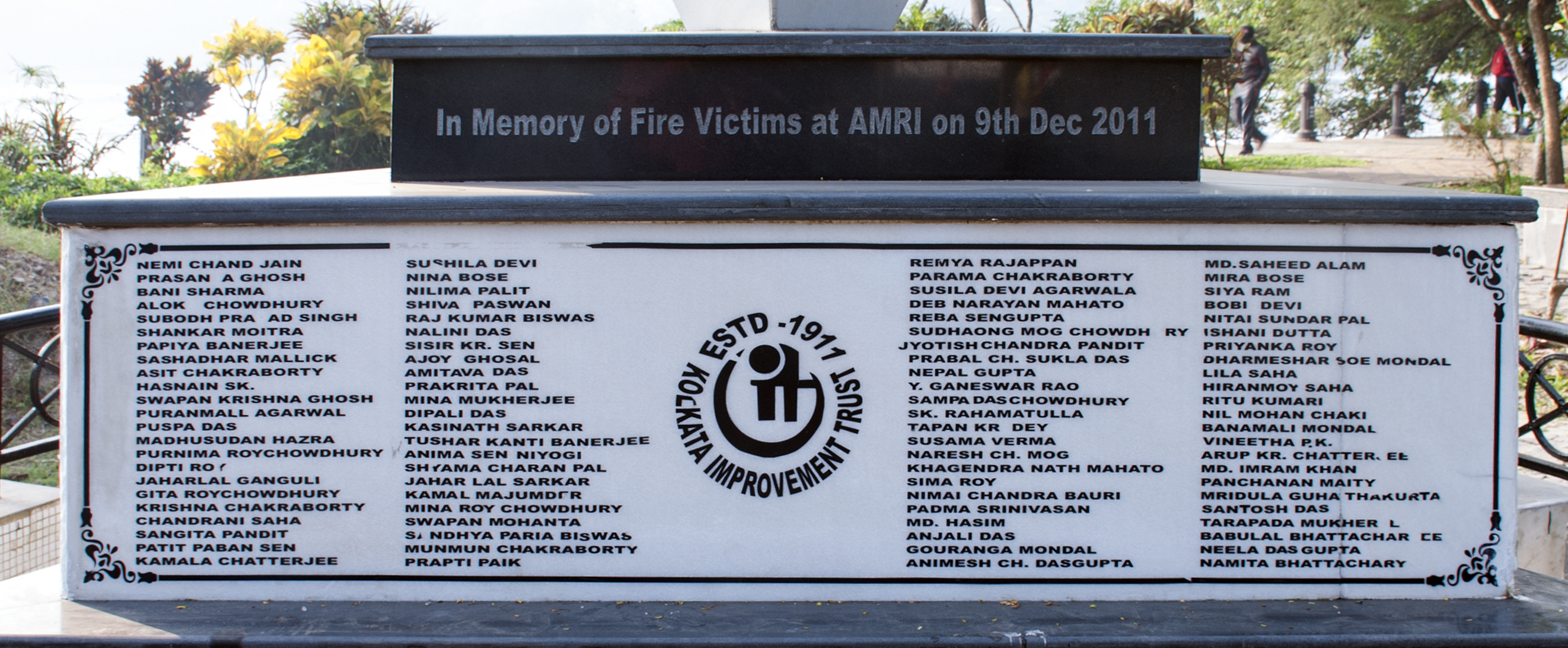
Plaque with the names of AMRI fire victims, Rabindra Sarobar

Mamata Banerjee, the Chief Minister, had initially put the tally at 61. The state Police filed an FIR against the hospital and had its license revoked; the fire department lodged an FIR against the hospital for inadequate fire preventive measures. Subsequent investigation revealed that medical waste and chemicals kept in the basement had aided the fire. The state government announced that two committees would probe fire plans in other parts of the city. The owners of the hospital, RS Goenka and SK Todi, surrendered at the local police station. The hospital authority later announced 5 lakhs compensation for the deceased's families.

The AMRI directors were taken into police custody on 20 December, during which the fire department found them guilty of negligence. The Finance Minister of India, Pranab Mukherjee, visited the SSKM hospital on the night of the incident. Prime Minister Manmohan Singh offered condolences to the victim's families and announced compensation of two lakhs to the kin. The West Bengal government started paying compensation of 3 lakhs to the victims on 2 January 2012, many of which decided to use it fighting the case against the hospital. On 3 January 2012, FICCI urged the West Bengal government to release those directors who are not responsible in "day to day operations", in order to prevent negative view for the investors. Mamata Banerjee rejected the request on the ground that the law will take its own course. On 5 January 2012, the city court rejected the bail plea of the accused and extended their custody to 19 January, considering the ongoing investigation and sensitivity of the case.

On 1 February 2012, the Calcutta High Court directed the hospital management to submit treatment bills, later the director was released on bail. On 30 December 2013, the hospital unit was reopened partially, which it became fully operational by 5 July 2014.

Ultimately a total of 16 people stood accused in connection with the fire in July 2016, including the board members and several directors of the hospital. Amongst the charges were culpable homicide not amounting to murder under section 304 of the Indian Penal Code.
