= Rowing Federation of India =

- Sport: Rowing
- Jurisdiction: India
- Abbreviation: RFI
- Founded: 30 August 1976
- Affiliation: World Rowing
- Regional affiliation: Asian Rowing Federation
- Headquarters: 51/3, Panchanantala Lane, Behala, Kolkata-700034
- President: BALAJI MARADAPA
- Secretary: SUBHASISH MUKHERJEE

Official website
- www.indiarowing.com
- (India)

The Rowing Federation of India is the central body for the game of rowing in India. It was formed on 30 August 1976 with a view to make the sport of Rowing popular in India. It is affiliated with the Indian Olympic Association and World Rowing and Asian Rowing Federation .

== History ==
The British brought this game to this sub-continent of India and it was organised wherever suitable stretches of water were found near their settlements. The Calcutta Rowing Club, Calcutta was founded in 1858 followed by the Madras Boat Club, Madras in 1867, the Royal Connaught Boat Club, Pune in 1868, Karachi Boat Club, Karachi in 1923 and the Rangoon University Boat Club in 1923. Then ten active members from the Rowing Clubs of Calcutta and Madras, feeling a need for National and International status for the sport in India, formed the Rowing Federation of India on 30 August 1976. Since then the RFI has been popularizing the game nationwide and producing distinct players from the country.

== Affiliates ==
Till date the RFI has 28 affiliated state and national bodies under it consisting of 19 Members, 6 Provisional Members and 3 Associate Members.

Members

- Andaman and Nicobar Rowing Association
- Assam Boat Racing and Rowing Association
- Chandigarh Rowing Association
- Delhi Rowing Association
- Jharkhand Rowing Association
- Karnataka Amateur Rowing Association
- Kerala Race Boats and Amateur Rowing Association
- Maharashtra Rowing Association
- Manipur Rowing Association
- Odisha Association for Rowing and Sculling
- Punjab Amateur Rowing Association
- Rowing Association of Haryana
- Rowing Association of Madhya Pradesh
- Sculling and Rowing Association of Andhra Pradesh
- Tamil Nadu Amateur Rowing Association
- Telangana Rowing Association
- Uttar Pradesh Rowing Association
- Uttarakhand Rowing Association
- West Bengal Rowing Association

Provisional Members

- Chhattisgarh Pradesh Rowing Association (Provisionally Affiliated)
- Gujarat Rowing Association (Provisionally Affiliated)
- Jammu and Kashmir Rowing Association (Provisionally Affiliated)
- Rajasthan Rowing Association (Provisionally Affiliated)
- Rowing Association of Bihar (Provisionally Affiliated)
- Socie'te D'Aviron Pondicherry (Provisionally Affiliated)

Associate Members

- All India Police Sports Control Board
- Association of Indian Universities
- Services Sports Control Board
