= Calcutta Rowing Club =

Indian rowing club

Calcutta Rowing Club ক্যালকাটা রোয়িং ক্লাব
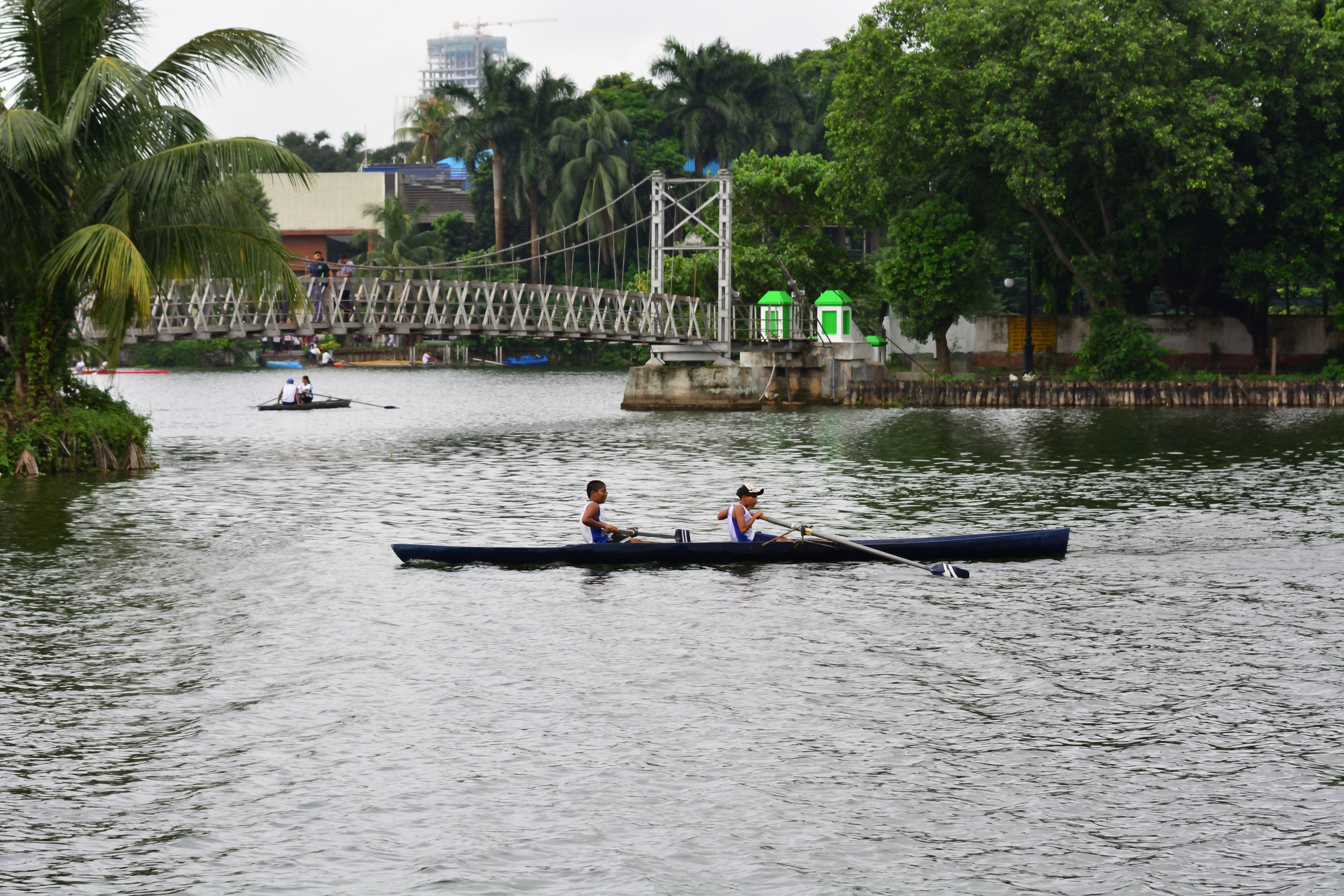
- Location: 15 Rabindra Sarobar, Calcutta-700029, Kolkata, India
- Coordinates: 22.512275°N 88.354725°E
- Home water: Rabindra Sarobar
- Founded: 1858
- Key people: Chandan Roy Chowdhury (Honorary Secretary)
- Affiliations: Rowing Federation of India; Amateur Rowing Association of the East
- Website: www.calcuttarowingclub.co.in

The Calcutta Rowing Club (CRC), located in Kolkata, West Bengal, India, was founded in 1858 and is one of the oldest rowing clubs of its kind outside the United Kingdom.

== History ==
The club's early history was lost in the great cyclone which hit Calcutta in 1864, during which the boat house and the boats, together with the minute books and records, disappeared. The only things preserved were the accounts of 1858-59 signed by John Cowle, as the Honorary Secretary and Treasurer, and he goes down in history as the first officer on record. In these records it is noted that a six oared boat was purchased for Rs. 300 and the following year a ‘Four’ was imported from Hong Kong for a sum of Rs. 448. After the cyclone, a temporary thatched roof boat house was built in 1861, on the banks of the Hooghly near Chand pal Ghat, the Regatta course was 1 mile from Fort Point to Shalimar or from Shalimar to Botanical Gardens. In 1864 the Club colours of Blue and White were adopted.

The club competed at the Head of the Lake Regatta, an annual rowing competition that began in 1933. At the 1950 All-India Regatta, the CRC won trophies in all three events — sculls, pairs and fours. The feat was previously achieved only by the Royal Connaught Boat Club in 1936.

== Present location ==
With the construction of the Dhakuria Lake in 1928, the club moved to its present location- 15 Rabindra Sarobar, Calcutta-700029. CRC has maintained its outstanding position in the rowing scene and from 1979 won the ARAE, the WBRA and the Head of Lake trophies - a stream of unique successes which no rowing club in the East has yet been able to achieve.

== Reciprocal clubs ==
The club has reciprocal arrangements with more than 100 clubs throughout the world. Members can use the facilities of overseas reciprocal clubs with a card or letter of introduction issued by the Calcutta Rowing Club.

- Madras Boat Club, Chennai, India
- The Durban Club, Durban, South Africa
- National Liberal Club, London, UK
- The Clifton Club, Bristol, UK
- Ceylon Sports Club, Singapore
- Terminal City Club, Vancouver, Canada
- The British Club, Bangkok, Thailand

== See also ==
- Rowing Federation of India
