= 2017 World Rowing Championships – Men's single sculls =

Men's single sculls at the 2017 World Rowing Championships
- Venue: Nathan Benderson Park
- Location: Sarasota, United States
- Dates: 24 September – 1 October
- Competitors: 40 from 40 nations
- Winning time: 6:40.64

Medalists
gold medal	Ondřej Synek	Czech Republic
silver medal	Ángel Fournier	Cuba
bronze medal	Tom Barras	Great Britain

The men's single sculls competition at the 2017 World Rowing Championships in Sarasota took place in Nathan Benderson Park.

== Schedule ==
The schedule was as follows:

Date	Time	Round
Sunday 24 September 2017	12:56	Heats
Monday 25 September 2017	12:39	Repechages
Wednesday 27 September 2017	10:34	Semifinals E/F/G
Wednesday 27 September 2017	12:41	Quarterfinals
Thursday 28 September 2017	09:30	Semifinals C/D
Friday 29 September 2017	10:45	Semifinals A/B
Friday 29 September 2017	13:20	Final G
Friday 29 September 2017	13:25	Final F
Friday 29 September 2017	13:30	Final E
Friday 29 September 2017	13:40	Final D
Friday 29 September 2017	14:20	Final C
Sunday 1 October 2017	09:15	Final B
Sunday 1 October 2017	11:27	Final A

All times are Eastern Daylight Time (UTC−4)

== Results ==
=== Heats ===
The two fastest boats in each heat advanced directly to the quarterfinals. The remaining boats were sent to the repechages.

==== Heat 1 ====
Rank	Rower	Country	Time	Notes
1	Ángel Fournier	Cuba	7:04.48	Q
2	Robert Ven	Finland	7:06.97	Q
3	Quentin Antognelli	Monaco	7:11.12	R
4	Lucas Verthein	Brazil	7:17.21	R
5	Juan Carlos Cabrera	Mexico	7:20.29	R

==== Heat 2 ====
Rank	Rower	Country	Time	Notes
1	Ondřej Synek	Czech Republic	7:03.32	Q
2	Thibaut Verhoeven	France	7:14.47	Q
3	Kim Dong-yong	South Korea	7:32.78	R
4	Dani Fridman	Israel	7:55.14	R
5	Ozave Miller	Saint Vincent and the Grenadines	8:06.47	R

==== Heat 3 ====
Rank	Rower	Country	Time	Notes
1	Tim Ole Naske	Germany	7:08.09	Q
2	Vladislav Ryabtsev	Russia	7:11.16	Q
3	Arturo Rivarola	Paraguay	7:32.29	R
4	Maksym Rashchepkin	Ukraine	7:39.02	R
5	Stephen Cox	Zimbabwe	7:40.71	R

==== Heat 4 ====
Rank	Rower	Country	Time	Notes
1	Sverri Sandberg Nielsen	Denmark	7:04.48	Q
2	Brian Rosso	Argentina	7:10.81	Q
3	Ryuta Arakawa	Japan	7:14.34	R
4	David Prada	Spain	7:19.61	R
5	Michael Knowles	Bahamas	8:59.27	R

==== Heat 5 ====
Rank	Rower	Country	Time	Notes
1	Damir Martin	Croatia	7:10.38	Q
2	Marko Marjanović	Serbia	7:18.99	Q
3	Sabrillo Barotov	Uzbekistan	7:37.82	R
4	Mohamed Ben Sidhom	Tunisia	7:42.06	R
5	Daniel Marquardt	Samoa	7:46.70	R

==== Heat 6 ====
Rank	Rower	Country	Time	Notes
1	Tom Barras	Great Britain	6:51.20	Q
2	Robbie Manson	New Zealand	6:56.97	Q
3	Michael Clougher	United States	7:01.13	R
4	Kyle Schoonbee	South Africa	7:08.57	R
5	Cai Pengpeng	China	7:20.80	R

==== Heat 7 ====
Rank	Rower	Country	Time	Notes
1	Natan Węgrzycki-Szymczyk	Poland	6:59.80	Q
2	Nico Stahlberg	Switzerland	7:05.60	Q
3	Joseph Purman	Puerto Rico	7:22.13	R
4	Aleksandar Aleksandrov	Azerbaijan	7:26.52	R
5	Roberto López	El Salvador	7:29.68	R

==== Heat 8 ====
Rank	Rower	Country	Time	Notes
1	Stanislau Shcharbachenia	Belarus	6:57.65	Q
2	Stefan Broenink	Netherlands	6:59.97	Q
3	Anders Backeus	Sweden	7:07.37	R
4	Salvatore Monfrecola	Italy	7:16.01	R
5	Privel Hinkati	Benin	7:38.74	R

=== Repechages ===
The two fastest boats in each repechage advanced to the quarterfinals. The remaining boats were sent to the E/F/G semifinals.

==== Repechage 1 ====
Rank	Rower	Country	Time	Notes
1	Juan Carlos Cabrera	Mexico	7:04.25	Q
2	Kim Dong-yong	South Korea	7:05.97	Q
3	Salvatore Monfrecola	Italy	7:07.37	SE/F/G
4	David Prada	Spain	7:08.12	SE/F/G
5	Arturo Rivarola	Paraguay	7:24.28	SE/F/G
6	Daniel Marquardt	Samoa	7:52.02	SE/F/G

==== Repechage 2 ====
Rank	Rower	Country	Time	Notes
1	Anders Backeus	Sweden	7:09.05	Q
2	Lucas Verthein	Brazil	7:14.90	Q
3	Joseph Purman	Puerto Rico	7:25.91	SE/F/G
4	Cai Pengpeng	China	7:28.36	SE/F/G
5	Mohamed Ben Sidhom	Tunisia	7:35.92	SE/F/G
6	Ozave Miller	Saint Vincent and the Grenadines	7:55.96	SE/F/G

==== Repechage 3 ====
Rank	Rower	Country	Time	Notes
1	Ryuta Arakawa	Japan	7:08.93	Q
2	Kyle Schoonbee	South Africa	7:15.70	Q
3	Dani Fridman	Israel	7:23.61	SE/F/G
4	Stephen Cox	Zimbabwe	7:25.64	SE/F/G
5	Roberto López	El Salvador	7:33.00	SE/F/G
6	Sabrillo Barotov	Uzbekistan	7:44.12	SE/F/G

==== Repechage 4 ====
Rank	Rower	Country	Time	Notes
1	Michael Clougher	United States	7:04.66	Q
2	Quentin Antognelli	Monaco	7:08.95	Q
3	Maksym Rashchepkin	Ukraine	7:17.69	SE/F/G
4	Aleksandar Aleksandrov	Azerbaijan	7:25.90	SE/F/G
5	Privel Hinkati	Benin	7:27.13	SE/F/G
6	Michael Knowles	Bahamas	8:58.51	SE/F/G

=== Quarterfinals ===
The three fastest boats in each quarter advanced to the A/B semifinals. The remaining boats were sent to the C/D semifinals.

==== Quarterfinal 1 ====
Rank	Rower	Country	Time	Notes
1	Ángel Fournier	Cuba	6:49.30	SA/B
2	Damir Martin	Croatia	6:51.52	SA/B
3	Robbie Manson	New Zealand	6:55.88	SA/B
4	Thibaut Verhoeven	France	7:02.22	SC/D
5	Kyle Schoonbee	South Africa	7:03.20	SC/D
6	Juan Carlos Cabrera	Mexico	7:06.28	SC/D

==== Quarterfinal 2 ====
Rank	Rower	Country	Time	Notes
1	Ondřej Synek	Czech Republic	6:47.22	SA/B
2	Tom Barras	Great Britain	6:47.83	SA/B
3	Marko Marjanović	Serbia	6:54.02	SA/B
4	Robert Ven	Finland	7:01.89	SC/D
5	Anders Backeus	Sweden	7:04.99	SC/D
6	Quentin Antognelli	Monaco	7:27.37	SC/D

==== Quarterfinal 3 ====
Rank	Rower	Country	Time	Notes
1	Tim Ole Naske	Germany	6:48.23	SA/B
2	Stefan Broenink	Netherlands	6:50.16	SA/B
3	Natan Węgrzycki-Szymczyk	Poland	6:57.75	SA/B
4	Ryuta Arakawa	Japan	7:07.04	SC/D
5	Kim Dong-yong	South Korea	7:15.27	SC/D
6	Brian Rosso	Argentina	7:18.42	SC/D

==== Quarterfinal 4 ====
Rank	Rower	Country	Time	Notes
1	Vladislav Ryabtsev	Russia	6:47.15	SA/B
2	Nico Stahlberg	Switzerland	6:48.21	SA/B
3	Sverri Sandberg Nielsen	Denmark	6:48.23	SA/B
4	Stanislau Shcharbachenia	Belarus	6:48.90	SC/D
5	Michael Clougher	United States	6:54.38	SC/D
6	Lucas Verthein	Brazil	7:11.39	SC/D

=== Semifinals E/F/G ===
In each semi, the boats progressed as follows:

The two fastest were sent to the E final.
The next two fastest were sent to the F final.
Any remaining boats were sent to the G final.

==== Semifinal 1 ====
Rank	Rower	Country	Time	Notes
1	Maksym Rashchepkin	Ukraine	7:37.23	FE
2	Arturo Rivarola	Paraguay	7:43.22	FE
3	Joseph Purman	Puerto Rico	7:52.85	FF
4	Roberto López	El Salvador	7:59.39	FF
5	Daniel Marquardt	Samoa	8:01.02	FG
6	Michael Knowles	Bahamas	9:10.58	FG

==== Semifinal 2 ====
Rank	Rower	Country	Time	Notes
1	David Prada	Spain	7:34.23	FE
2	Dani Fridman	Israel	7:35.72	FE
3	Cai Pengpeng	China	7:45.32	FF
4	Privel Hinkati	Benin	7:57.49	FF
5	Ozave Miller	Saint Vincent and the Grenadines	8:17.91	FG

==== Semifinal 3 ====
Rank	Rower	Country	Time	Notes
1	Salvatore Monfrecola	Italy	7:30.37	FE
2	Stephen Cox	Zimbabwe	7:37.22	FE
3	Aleksandar Aleksandrov	Azerbaijan	7:46.39	FF
4	Mohamed Ben Sidhom	Tunisia	7:48.51	FF
5	Sabrillo Barotov	Uzbekistan	8:17.75	FG

=== Semifinals C/D ===
The three fastest boats in each semi were sent to the C final. The remaining boats were sent to the D final.

==== Semifinal 1 ====
Rank	Rower	Country	Time	Notes
1	Thibaut Verhoeven	France	6:58.90	FC
2	Robert Ven	Finland	7:01.57	FC
3	Brian Rosso	Argentina	7:03.12	FC
4	Michael Clougher	United States	7:04.28	FD
5	Juan Carlos Cabrera	Mexico	7:10.23	FD
6	Kim Dong-yong	South Korea	7:12.24	FD

==== Semifinal 2 ====
Rank	Rower	Country	Time	Notes
1	Kyle Schoonbee	South Africa	7:04.37	FC
2	Stanislau Shcharbachenia	Belarus	7:04.91	FC
3	Ryuta Arakawa	Japan	7:06.15	FC
4	Anders Backeus	Sweden	7:10.50	FD
5	Lucas Verthein	Brazil	7:15.61	FD
6	Quentin Antognelli	Monaco	7:19.04	FD

=== Semifinals A/B ===
The three fastest boats in each semi advanced to the A final. The remaining boats were sent to the B final.

==== Semifinal 1 ====
Rank	Rower	Country	Time	Notes
1	Ondřej Synek	Czech Republic	6:51.16	FA
2	Ángel Fournier	Cuba	6:52.68	FA
3	Robbie Manson	New Zealand	6:53.01	FA
4	Natan Węgrzycki-Szymczyk	Poland	6:56.43	FB
5	Stefan Broenink	Netherlands	7:04.21	FB
6	Nico Stahlberg	Switzerland	7:17.22	FB

==== Semifinal 2 ====
Rank	Rower	Country	Time	Notes
1	Tom Barras	Great Britain	6:49.97	FA
2	Damir Martin	Croatia	6:51.36	FA
3	Tim Ole Naske	Germany	6:51.94	FA
4	Sverri Sandberg Nielsen	Denmark	6:53.42	FB
5	Marko Marjanović	Serbia	7:02.95	FB
6	Vladislav Ryabtsev	Russia	7:09.81	FB

=== Finals ===
The A final determined the rankings for places 1 to 6. Additional rankings were determined in the other finals.

==== Final G ====
Rank	Rower	Country	Time
1	Sabrillo Barotov	Uzbekistan	7:27.72
2	Daniel Marquardt	Samoa	7:42.32
3	Ozave Miller	Saint Vincent and the Grenadines	7:53.80
4	Michael Knowles	Bahamas	8:28.23

==== Final F ====
Rank	Rower	Country	Time
1	Joseph Purman	Puerto Rico	7:13.65
2	Cai Pengpeng	China	7:22.51
3	Mohamed Ben Sidhom	Tunisia	7:24.78
4	Privel Hinkati	Benin	7:29.05
5	Roberto López	El Salvador	7:34.91
6	Aleksandar Aleksandrov	Azerbaijan	DNS

==== Final E ====
Rank	Rower	Country	Time
1	Dani Fridman	Israel	7:02.87
2	Salvatore Monfrecola	Italy	7:04.28
3	David Prada	Spain	7:04.78
4	Maksym Rashchepkin	Ukraine	7:15.72
5	Stephen Cox	Zimbabwe	7:20.98
6	Arturo Rivarola	Paraguay	7:24.98

==== Final D ====
Rank	Rower	Country	Time
1	Michael Clougher	United States	6:58.87
2	Juan Carlos Cabrera	Mexico	7:01.58
3	Kim Dong-yong	South Korea	7:04.66
4	Anders Backeus	Sweden	7:05.36
5	Quentin Antognelli	Monaco	7:10.02
6	Lucas Verthein	Brazil	7:14.76

==== Final C ====
Rank	Rower	Country	Time
1	Thibaut Verhoeven	France	6:47.42
2	Stanislau Shcharbachenia	Belarus	6:49.52
3	Kyle Schoonbee	South Africa	6:49.87
4	Robert Ven	Finland	6:52.09
5	Brian Rosso	Argentina	6:57.62
6	Ryuta Arakawa	Japan	7:00.26

==== Final B ====
Rank	Rower	Country	Time
1	Natan Węgrzycki-Szymczyk	Poland	6:57.81
2	Marko Marjanović	Serbia	6:57.87
3	Nico Stahlberg	Switzerland	7:01.38
4	Vladislav Ryabtsev	Russia	7:03.64
5	Stefan Broenink	Netherlands	7:04.17
6	Sverri Sandberg Nielsen	Denmark	7:04.93

==== Final A ====
Rank	Rower	Country	Time
1st place, gold medalist(s)	Ondřej Synek	Czech Republic	6:40.64
2nd place, silver medalist(s)	Ángel Fournier	Cuba	6:43.49
3rd place, bronze medalist(s)	Tom Barras	Great Britain	6:45.14
4	Damir Martin	Croatia	6:45.50
5	Robbie Manson	New Zealand	6:52.84
6	Tim Ole Naske	Germany	6:55.90
