= Rowing at the 2022 Asian Games – Men's double sculls =

Men's double sculls at the 2022 Asian Games
- Venue: Fuyang Water Sports Centre
- Date: 20–24 September 2023
- Competitors: 24 from 12 nations

Medalists
| gold medal | Liu Zhiyu; Zhang Liang | China |
| silver medal | Shakhboz Kholmurzaev; Mekhrojbek Mamatkulov | Uzbekistan |
| bronze medal | Ihram; La Memo | Indonesia |

The men's double sculls competition at the 2022 Asian Games in Hangzhou, China was held from 20 to 24 September 2023 at the Fuyang Water Sports Centre.

== Schedule ==
All times are China Standard Time (UTC+08:00)

| Date | Time | Event |
|---|---|---|
| Wednesday, 20 September 2023 | 10:00 | Heats |
| Thursday, 21 September 2023 | 09:50 | Repechages |
| Sunday, 24 September 2023 | 10:20 | Finals |

== Results ==
=== Heats ===
- Qualification: 1 → Final A (FA), 2–6 → Repechages (R)

==== Heat 1 ====
| Rank | Team | Time | Notes |
|---|---|---|---|
| 1 | China (CHN); Liu Zhiyu; Zhang Liang | 6:22.76 | FA |
| 2 | India (IND); Satnam Singh; Parminder Singh | 6:27.01 | R |
| 3 | Indonesia (INA); Ihram; La Memo | 6:33.63 | R |
| 4 | Sri Lanka (SRI); Mohamed Nafiran; Nuwan Sampath | 7:01.92 | R |
| 5 | South Korea (KOR); Kim Dong-yong; Park Hyun-su | 7:08.61 | R |
| 6 | Kuwait (KUW); Yousef Al-Abdulhadi; Mohammad Sabti | 7:47.94 | R |

==== Heat 2 ====
| Rank | Team | Time | Notes |
|---|---|---|---|
| 1 | Uzbekistan (UZB); Shakhboz Kholmurzaev; Mekhrojbek Mamatkulov | 6:16.35 | FA |
| 2 | Iran (IRI); Reza Ghahramani; Amir Hossein Mahmoudpour | 6:20.13 | R |
| 3 | Iraq (IRQ); Baker Shihab; Mohammed Riyadh | 6:32.96 | R |
| 4 | Thailand (THA); Narongsak Naksaeng; Premanut Wattananusith | 6:38.31 | R |
| 5 | Hong Kong (HKG); Jaden Head; Ho Siu Wing | 7:00.96 | R |
| 6 | Bahrain (BRN); Fahad Al-Banki; Omar Al-Hasan | 8:14.76 | R |

=== Repechages ===
- Qualification: 1–2 → Final A (FA), 3–5 → Final B (FB)

==== Repechage 1 ====
| Rank | Team | Time | Notes |
|---|---|---|---|
| 1 | India (IND); Satnam Singh; Parminder Singh | 6:48.06 | FA |
| 2 | Iraq (IRQ); Baker Shihab; Mohammed Riyadh | 6:51.90 | FA |
| 3 | Hong Kong (HKG); Jaden Head; Ho Siu Wing | 7:08.64 | FB |
| 4 | Sri Lanka (SRI); Mohamed Nafiran; Nuwan Sampath | 7:23.07 | FB |
| 5 | Kuwait (KUW); Yousef Al-Abdulhadi; Mohammad Sabti | 8:11.07 | FB |

==== Repechage 2 ====
| Rank | Team | Time | Notes |
|---|---|---|---|
| 1 | Indonesia (INA); Ihram; La Memo | 6:42.22 | FA |
| 2 | Iran (IRI); Reza Ghahramani; Amir Hossein Mahmoudpour | 6:45.11 | FA |
| 3 | South Korea (KOR); Kim Dong-yong; Park Hyun-su | 6:48.71 | FB |
| 4 | Thailand (THA); Narongsak Naksaeng; Premanut Wattananusith | 6:50.37 | FB |
| 5 | Bahrain (BRN); Fahad Al-Banki; Omar Al-Hasan | 8:39.54 | FB |

=== Finals ===
==== Final B ====
| Rank | Team | Time |
|---|---|---|
| 1 | South Korea (KOR); Kim Dong-yong; Park Hyun-su | 6:52.57 |
| 2 | Hong Kong (HKG); Jaden Head; Ho Siu Wing | 6:58.55 |
| 3 | Sri Lanka (SRI); Mohamed Nafiran; Nuwan Sampath | 7:05.08 |
| 4 | Thailand (THA); Narongsak Naksaeng; Premanut Wattananusith | 7:11.94 |
| 5 | Kuwait (KUW); Yousef Al-Abdulhadi; Mohammad Sabti | 7:52.41 |
| 6 | Bahrain (BRN); Fahad Al-Banki; Omar Al-Hasan | 8:29.87 |

==== Final A ====
| Rank | Team | Time |
|---|---|---|
| 1st place, gold medalist(s) | China (CHN); Liu Zhiyu; Zhang Liang | 6:21.54 |
| 2nd place, silver medalist(s) | Uzbekistan (UZB); Shakhboz Kholmurzaev; Mekhrojbek Mamatkulov | 6:26.25 |
| 3rd place, bronze medalist(s) | Indonesia (INA); Ihram; La Memo | 6:27.83 |
| 4 | Iran (IRI); Reza Ghahramani; Amir Hossein Mahmoudpour | 6:34.02 |
| 5 | Iraq (IRQ); Baker Shihab; Mohammed Riyadh | 6:34.22 |
| 6 | India (IND); Satnam Singh; Parminder Singh | 6:40.90 |
