= 2022 World Rowing Championships – Men's lightweight single sculls =

Men's lightweight single sculls at the 2022 World Rowing Championships
- Venue: Labe aréna
- Location: Račice, Czech Republic
- Dates: 18 September – 23 September
- Competitors: 27 from 27 nations
- Winning time: 7:03.40

Medalists
gold medal	Gabriel Soares	Italy
silver medal	Antonios Papakonstantinou	Greece
bronze medal	Rajko Hrvat	Slovenia

The men's lightweight single sculls competition at the 2022 World Rowing Championships took place at the Račice regatta venue.

== Schedule ==
The schedule was as follows:

Date	Time	Round
Sunday 18 September 2022	10:40	Heats
Monday 19 September 2022	16:19	Repechages
Wednesday 21 September 2022	10:28	Quarterfinals
Wednesday 21 September 2022	12:28	Final E
Thursday 22 September 2022	10:00	Semifinals A/B
Thursday 22 September 2022	15:00	Semifinals C/D
Friday 23 September 2022	10:15	Final D
Friday 23 September 2022	10:25	Final C
Friday 23 September 2022	10:35	Final B
Friday 23 September 2022	15:02	Final A

All times are Central European Summer Time (UTC+2)

== Results ==
=== Heats ===
The four fastest boats in each heat advanced directly to the AD quarterfinals. The remaining boats were sent to the repechages.

==== Heat 1 ====
Rank	Rower	Country	Time	Notes
1	Andri Struzina	Switzerland	7:00.27	Q
2	Dale Flockhart	Great Britain	7:03.52	Q
3	Lukasz Sawicki	Poland	7:05.39	Q
4	Hugh Moore	Ireland	7:12.41	Q
5	James McCullough	United States	7:22.61	R
6	Ghaith Kadri	Tunisia	7:23.77	R

==== Heat 2 ====
Rank	Rower	Country	Time	Notes
1	Hamish Harding	Australia	7:03.31	Q
2	Lazar Penev	Bulgaria	7:06.23	Q
3	Ahmet Rapi	Sweden	7:07.31	Q
4	Baptiste Savaete	France	7:09.50	Q
5	Naoki Furuta	Japan	7:24.11	R
6	Amel Younis	Palestine	8:03.44	R

==== Heat 3 ====
Rank	Rower	Country	Time	Notes
1	Antonios Papakonstantinou	Greece	6:54.00	Q
2	Sid Ali Boudina	Algeria	7:08.45	Q
3	Oskar Soedal	Norway	7:14.07	Q
4	Mohammed Al-Khafaji	Iraq	7:16.36	Q
5	Kasper Hirvilampi	Finland	7:30.96	R

==== Heat 4 ====
Rank	Rower	Country	Time	Notes
1	Bruno Cetraro Berriolo	Uruguay	7:01.26	Q
2	Rajko Hrvat	Slovenia	7:04.57	Q
3	Finn Wolter	Germany	7:16.00	Q
4	Oscar Petersen	Denmark	7:23.20	Q
5	Shanaka Kariyawasam	Sri Lanka	7:54.10	R

==== Heat 5 ====
Rank	Rower	Country	Time	Notes
1	Gabriel Soares	Italy	7:01.78	Q
2	Amirhossein Mahmoodpour	Iran	7:02.49	Q
3	Konrad Hultsch	Austria	7:02.59	Q
4	Alexis López	Mexico	7:08.04	Q
5	Giorgi Kanteladze	Georgia	7:28.08	R

=== Repechages ===
The two fastest boats in repechage advanced to the quarterfinals. The remaining boats were sent to the E final.

==== Repechage 1 ====
Rank	Rower	Country	Time	Notes
1	James McCulloug	United States	7:14.34	Q
2	Kasper Hirvilampi	Finland	7:17.55	Q
3	Giorgi Kanteladze	Georgia	7:19.21	FE
4	Amel Younis	Palestine	7:44.86	FE

==== Repechage 2 ====
Rank	Rower	Country	Time	Notes
1	Naoki Furuta	Japan	7:20.46	Q
2	Ghaith Kadri	Tunisia	7:21.64	Q
3	Shanaka Kariyawasam	Sri Lanka	7:54.93	FE

=== Quarterfinals ===
The three fastest boats in each quarter advanced to the A/B semifinals. The remaining boats were sent to the C/D semifinals

==== Quarterfinal 1 ====
Rank	Rower	Country	Time	Notes
1	Alexis López	Mexico	7:03.31	SA/B
2	Hamish Harding	Australia	7:03.50	SA/B
3	Andri Struzina	Switzerland	7:05.05	SA/B
4	Finn Wolter	Germany	7:11.87	SC/D
5	Oskar Soedal	Norway	7:14.68	SC/D
6	Ghaith Kadri	Tunisia	7:25.25	SC/D

==== Quarterfinal 2 ====
Rank	Rower	Country	Time	Notes
1	Antonios Papakonstantinou	Greece	7:02.88	SA/B
2	Rajko Hrvat	Slovenia	7:05.44	SA/B
3	Baptiste Savaete	France	7:07.16	SA/B
4	Konrad Hultsch	Austria	7:12.93	SC/D
5	Lukasz Sawicki	Poland	7:16.68	SC/D
6	Naoki Furuta	Japan	7:19.14	SC/D

==== Quarterfinal 3 ====
Rank	Rower	Country	Time	Notes
1	Bruno Cetraro Berriolo	Uruguay	7:05.70	SA/B
2	Dale Flockhart	Great Britain	7:06.20	SA/B
3	Ahmet Rapi	Sweden	7:08.66	SA/B
4	Mohammed Al-Khafaji	Iraq	7:11.31	SC/D
5	Amirhossein Mahmoodpour	Iran	7:17.69	SC/D
6	Kasper Hirvilampi	Finland	7:22.83	SC/D

==== Quarterfinal 4 ====
Rank	Rower	Country	Time	Notes
1	Gabriel Soares	Italy	7:02.32	SA/B
2	Sid Ali Boudina	Algeria	7:02.65	SA/B
3	Lazar Penev	Bulgaria	7:08.46	SA/B
4	Hugh Moore	Ireland	7:11.08	SC/D
5	James McCullough	United States	7:17.94	SC/D
6	Oscar Petersen	Denmark	7:19.62	SC/D

=== Semifinals C/D ===
The three fastest boats in each semi advanced to the C final. The remaining boats were sent to the D final.

==== Semifinal 1 ====
Rank	Rower	Country	Time	Notes
1	Mohammed Al-Khafaji	Iraq	7:27.04	FC
2	Finn Wolter	Germany	7:27.15	FC
3	James McCullough	United States	7:27.83	FC
4	Lukasz Sawicki	Poland	7:29.00	FD
5	Oscar Petersen	Denmark	7:32.58	FD
6	Ghaith Kadri	Tunisia	7:48.51	FD

==== Semifinal 2 ====
Rank	Rower	Country	Time	Notes
1	Amirhossein Mahmoodpour	Iran	7:23.80	FC
2	Oskar Soedal	Norway	7:25.41	FC
3	Konrad Hultsch	Austria	7:26.28	FC
4	Hugh Moore	Ireland	7:26.52	FD
5	Naoki Furuta	Japan	7:34.37	FD
6	Kasper Hirvilampi	Finland	7:44.56	FD

=== Semifinals A/B ===
The three fastest boats in each semi advanced to the A final. The remaining boats were sent to the B final.

==== Semifinal 1 ====
Rank	Rower	Country	Time	Notes
1	Andri Struzina	Switzerland	7:05.32	FA
2	Bruno Cetraro Berriolo	Uruguay	7:05.75	FA
3	Rajko Hrvat	Slovenia	7:05.95	FA
4	Sid Ali Boudina	Algeria	7:08.03	FB
5	Lazar Penev	Bulgaria	7:12.50	FB
6	Alexis López	Mexico	7:16.46	FB

==== Semifinal 2 ====
Rank	Rower	Country	Time	Notes
1	Antonios Papakonstantinou	Greece	7:02.46	FA
2	Gabriel Soares	Italy	7:05.24	FA
3	Baptiste Savaete	France	7:07.03	FA
4	Hamish Harding	Australia	7:08.20	FB
5	Dale Flockhart	Great Britain	7:08.80	FB
6	Ahmet Rapi	Sweden	7:24.31	FB

=== Finals ===
The A final determined the rankings for places 1 to 6. Additional rankings were determined in the other finals.

==== Final E ====
Rank	Rower	Country	Time	Total rank
1	Giorgi Kanteladze	Georgia	7:38.05	25
2	Amel Younis	Palestine	7:44.60	26
3	Shanaka Kariyawasam	Sri Lanka	8:15.16	27

==== Final D ====
Rank	Rower	Country	Time	Total rank
1	Lukasz Sawicki	Poland	7:13.99	19
2	Oscar Petersen	Denmark	7:15.98	20
3	Hugh Moore	Ireland	7:18.35	21
4	Naoki Furuta	Japan	7:19.76	22
5	Ghaith Kadri	Tunisia	7:27.21	23
6	Kasper Hirvilampi	Finland	7:28.23	24

==== Final C ====
Rank	Rower	Country	Time	Total rank
1	Finn Wolter	Germany	7:08.76	13
2	Amirhossein Mahmoodpour	Iran	7:08.99	14
3	Mohammed Al-Khafaji	Iraq	7:12.46	15
4	Konrad Hultsch	Austria	7:12.56	16
5	James McCullough	United States	7:15.42	17
6	Oskar Soedal	Norway	7:16.57	18

==== Final B ====
Rank	Rower	Country	Time	Total rank
1	Sid Ali Boudina	Algeria	7:01.40	7
2	Alexis López	Mexico	7:03.46	8
3	Hamish Harding	Australia	7:04.41	9
4	Ahmet Rapi	Sweden	7:05.27	10
5	Dale Flockhart	Great Britain	7:06.37	11
6	Lazar Penev	Bulgaria	7:07.99	12

==== Final A ====
Rank	Rower	Country	Time	Notes
1st place, gold medalist(s)	Gabriel Soares	Italy	7:03.40	
2nd place, silver medalist(s)	Antonios Papakonstantinou	Greece	7:05.42	
3rd place, bronze medalist(s)	Rajko Hrvat	Slovenia	7:08.66	
4	Bruno Cetraro Berriolo	Uruguay	7:14.79	
5	Baptiste Savaete	France	7:18.31	
6	Andri Struzina	Switzerland	9:22.42	
