= Rowing at the 2015 Pan American Games – Men's single sculls =

Rowing – Men's single sculls at the 2015 Pan American Games
- Venue: Royal Canadian Henley Rowing Course
- Dates: July 11 - July 15
- Competitors: 12 from 12 nations
- Winning time Final A: 7:51.39

Medalists
Gold medal	Ángel Fournier	Cuba
Silver medal	Rob Gibson	Canada
Bronze medal	Brian Rosso	Argentina

The men's single sculls rowing event at the 2015 Pan American Games was held from July 11–15 at the Royal Canadian Henley Rowing Course in St. Catharines.

== Schedule ==
All times are Eastern Standard Time (UTC-3).

Date	Time	Round
July 11, 2015	10:35	Heat 1
July 11, 2015	10:45	Heat 2
July 11, 2015	14:45	Repechage 1
July 11, 2015	14:55	Repechage 2
July 15, 2015	09:15	Final B
July 15, 2015	10:15	Final A

== Results ==
=== Heats ===
==== Heat 1 ====
Rank	Rowers	Country	Time	Notes
1	Ángel Fournier	Cuba	7.11.74	FA
2	Brian Rosso	Argentina	7.16.26	R
3	Juan Cabrera	Mexico	7.17.26	R
4	Gabriel Alves Campos	Brazil	7.33.76	R
5	Gerson Hernandez	El Salvador	7.37.47	R
6	Arturo Rivarola	Paraguay	7.46.35	R

==== Heat 2 ====
Rank	Rowers	Country	Time	Notes
1	Yohann Rigogne	United States	7.06.78	FA
2	Rob Gibson	Canada	7.22.77	R
3	Eduardo Linares	Peru	7.27.35	R
4	Revolorio Garcia	Guatemala	7.32.37	R
5	Montes Esquivel	Uruguay	7.40.34	R
6	Felipe Cardenas	Chile	7.50.76	R

=== Repechages ===
==== Repechage 1 ====
Rank	Rowers	Country	Time	Notes
1	Brian Rosso	Argentina	7.30.03	FA
2	Revolorio Garcia	Guatemala	7.32.03	FA
3	Eduardo Linares	Peru	7.34.17	FB
4	Gerson Hernandez	El Salvador	7.47.06	FB
5	Arturo Rivarola	Paraguay	8.02.01	FB

==== Repechage 2 ====
Rank	Rowers	Country	Time	Notes
1	Rob Gibson	Canada	7.19.16	FA
2	Juan Cabrera	Mexico	7.21.92	FA
3	Montes Esquivel	Uruguay	7.45.83	FB
4	Gabriel Alves Campos	Brazil	7.49.91	FB
5	Felipe Cardenas	Chile	8.19.48	FB

=== Finals ===
==== Final B ====
Rank	Rowers	Country	Time	Notes
7	Arturo Rivarola	Paraguay	8:09.37	
8	Eduardo Linares	Peru	8:14.28	
9	Montes Esquivel	Uruguay	8:21.08	
10	Gerson Hernandez	El Salvador	8:32.26	
11	Gabriel Alves Campos	Brazil	9:02.94	
	Felipe Cardenas	Chile	DNS	

==== Final A ====
Rank	Rowers	Country	Time	Notes
1st place, gold medalist(s)	Ángel Fournier	Cuba	7:51.39	
2nd place, silver medalist(s)	Rob Gibson	Canada	7:57.94	
3rd place, bronze medalist(s)	Brian Rosso	Argentina	8:01.38	
4	Yohann Rigogne	United States	8:02.40	
5	Juan Cabrera	Mexico	8:02.79	
6	Revolorio Garcia	Guatemala	8:18.14	
