= Rowing at the 2026 Asian Games – Men's quadruple sculls =

Men's quadruple sculls at the 2026 Asian Games
- Venue: Nagaragawa International Regatta Course
- Date: 23–24 September 2026
- Competitors: 36 from 9 nations

Medalists
gold medal	China; Mu Xiaolong, Zhang Xiuli, Xue Hao, Ou Zhiwei
silver medal	Indonesia; Ihram, Rendi Setia Maulana, Febrian, La Memo
bronze medal	Uzbekistan; Shakhboz Kholmurzaev, Davrjon Davronov, Mekhrojbek Mamatkulov, Pavel Sorin

The men's quadruple sculls competition at the 2026 Asian Games was held from 23 to 24 September 2026 at the Nagaragawa International Regatta Course, Gifu, Japan.

== Schedule ==
All times are Japan Standard Time (UTC+09:00)

Date	Time	Event
Wednesday, 23 September 2026	15:30	Heats
Thursday, 24 September 2026	16:20	Finals

== Results ==
=== Heats ===
- Qualification: 1–2 + next 2 fastest → Final A (FA), Rest → Final B (FB)

==== Heat 1 ====
Rank	Team	Time	Notes
1	China (CHN); Mu Xiaolong; Zhang Xiuli; Xue Hao; Ou Zhiwei	6:17.26	FA
2	Japan (JPN); Hideo Toyama; Hibiki Nagasaka; Tomoyoshi Nakamizo; Naoki Furuta	6:19.24	FA
3	South Korea (KOR); Kim Jee-hyuk; Kim Jong-min; Kim Dong-yong; Kang Woo-kyu	6:20.49	FA
4	Vietnam (VIE); Nguyễn Văn Hà; Bùi Văn Hoàn; Nguyễn Văn Hiếu; Nguyễn Hữu Thành	6:32.45	FB
5	Thailand (THA); Nawamin Dechudomrat; Yutthana Tamarom; Watchara Pangthong; Siripong Chaiwichitchonkul	6:34.73	FB

==== Heat 2 ====
Rank	Team	Time	Notes
1	Indonesia (INA); Ihram; Rendi Setia Maulana; Febrian; La Memo	6:11.28	FA
2	Uzbekistan (UZB); Shakhboz Kholmurzaev; Davrjon Davronov; Mekhrojbek Mamatkulov; Pavel Sorin	6:12.17	FA
3	India (IND); Kulwinder Singh; Navdeep Singh; Arvind Singh; Jakar Khan	6:18.62	FA
4	Hong Kong (HKG); Jaden Head; Liu Sung Lai; Jack Mak; Ho Wing Fai	6:40.46	FB

=== Finals ===
==== Final B ====
Rank	Team	Time
1	Vietnam (VIE); Nguyễn Văn Hà; Bùi Văn Hoàn; Nguyễn Văn Hiếu; Nguyễn Hữu Thành	6:01.90
2	Hong Kong (HKG); Jaden Head; Liu Sung Lai; Jack Mak; Ho Wing Fai	6:02.82
3	Thailand (THA); Nawamin Dechudomrat; Yutthana Tamarom; Watchara Pangthong; Siripong Chaiwichitchonkul	6:04.05

==== Final A ====
Rank	Team	Time
1st place, gold medalist(s)	China (CHN); Mu Xiaolong; Zhang Xiuli; Xue Hao; Ou Zhiwei	5:46.03
2nd place, silver medalist(s)	Indonesia (INA); Ihram; Rendi Setia Maulana; Febrian; La Memo	5:47.90
3rd place, bronze medalist(s)	Uzbekistan (UZB); Shakhboz Kholmurzaev; Davrjon Davronov; Mekhrojbek Mamatkulov; Pavel Sorin	5:48.96
4	Japan (JPN); Hideo Toyama; Hibiki Nagasaka; Tomoyoshi Nakamizo; Naoki Furuta	5:51.97
5	India (IND); Kulwinder Singh; Navdeep Singh; Jakar Khan; Balraj Panwar	5:52.17
6	South Korea (KOR); Kim Jee-hyuk; Kim Jong-min; Kim Dong-yong; Kang Woo-kyu	5:52.47
