= Rowing at the 2015 Pan American Games – Men's double sculls =

Rowing – Men's double sculls at the 2015 Pan American Games
- Venue: Royal Canadian Henley Rowing Course
- Dates: July 11 - July 13
- Competitors: 22 from 11 nations
- Winning time Final A: 6:30.35

Medalists
Gold medal	Eduardo Rubio; Ángel Fournier	Cuba
Silver medal	Rodrigo Murillo; Cristian Rosso	Argentina
Bronze medal	Pascal Lussier; Matthew Buie	Canada

The men's double sculls rowing event at the 2015 Pan American Games was held from July 11–13 at the Royal Canadian Henley Rowing Course in St. Catharines.

== Schedule ==
All times are Eastern Standard Time (UTC-3).

Date	Time	Round
July 11, 2015	9:15	Heat 1
July 11, 2015	9:25	Heat 2
July 11, 2015	14:05	Repechage 1
July 13, 2015	14:15	Repechage 2
July 11, 2015	9:05	Final B
July 13, 2015	9:45	Final A

== Results ==
=== Heats ===
==== Heat 1 ====
Rank	Rowers	Country	Time	Notes
1	Sam Stitt; Ryan Monaghan	United States	6:28.72	FA
2	Álvaro Torres; Renzo Leon Garcia	Peru	6:35.67	R
3	Diego Donizette Nazario; Emanuel Dantas Borges	Brazil	6:46.71	R
4	Mauricio Lopez Berocay; Emiliano Dumestre Guaraglia	Uruguay	6:52.38	R
5	Jakson Vicent Monasterio; Jose Guipe Jimenez	Venezuela	7:04.12	R
6	Franco Chiola; Daniel Sosa	Paraguay	7:06.97	R

==== Heat 2 ====
Rank	Rowers	Country	Time	Notes
1	Eduardo Rubio; Ángel Fournier	Cuba	6:27.28	FA
2	Pascal Lussier; Matthew Buie	Canada	6:28.87	R
3	Rodrigo Murillo; Cristian Rosso	Argentina	6:55.91	R
4	Miguel Carballo; Juan Flores	Mexico	6:57.92	R
5	Luis Saumann Salas; Ignacio Abraham	Chile	7:14.55	R

=== Repechages ===
==== Repechage 1 ====
Rank	Rowers	Country	Time	Notes
1	Rodrigo Murillo; Cristian Rosso	Argentina	6:52.08	FA
2	Álvaro Torres; Renzo Leon Garcia	Peru	6:57.44	FA
3	Mauricio Lopez Berocay; Emiliano Dumestre Guaraglia	Uruguay	7:00.58	FB
4	Franco Chiola; Daniel Sosa	Paraguay	7:19.25	FB
5	Luis Saumann Salas; Ignacio Abraham	Chile	7:34.27	FB

==== Repechage 2 ====
Rank	Rowers	Country	Time	Notes
1	Pascal Lussier; Matthew Buie	Canada	6:43.40	FA
2	Miguel Carballo; Juan Flores	Mexico	6:53.47	FA
3	Diego Donizette Nazario; Emanuel Dantas Borges	Brazil	7:00.75	FB
4	Jakson Vicent Monasterio; Jose Guipe Jimenez	Venezuela	7:11.69	FB

=== Finals ===
==== Final B ====
Rank	Rowers	Country	Time	Notes
7	Mauricio Lopez Berocay; Emiliano Dumestre Guaraglia	Uruguay	6:43.35	
8	Diego Donizette Nazario; Emanuel Dantas Borges	Brazil	6:47.13	
9	Jakson Vicent Monasterio; Jose Guipe Jimenez	Venezuela	6:54.84	
10	Franco Chiola; Daniel Sosa	Paraguay	7:01.43	
11	Luis Saumann Salas; Ignacio Abraham	Chile	7:09.64	

==== Final A ====
Rank	Rowers	Country	Time	Notes
1st place, gold medalist(s)	Eduardo Rubio; Ángel Fournier	Cuba	6:30.35	
2nd place, silver medalist(s)	Rodrigo Murillo; Cristian Rosso	Argentina	6:33.59	
3rd place, bronze medalist(s)	Pascal Lussier; Matthew Buie	Canada	6:35.89	
4	Sam Stitt; Ryan Monaghan	United States	6:39.77	
5	Álvaro Torres; Renzo Leon Garcia	Peru	6:42.85	
6	Miguel Carballo; Juan Flores	Mexico	6:54.00	
