= 2023 World Rowing Championships – Men's lightweight single sculls =

Men's lightweight single sculls at the 2023 World Rowing Championships
- Venue: Lake Sava
- Location: Belgrade, Serbia
- Dates: 3 September – 8 September
- Competitors: 27 from 27 nations
- Winning time: 7:42.41

Medalists
gold medal	Andri Struzina	Switzerland
silver medal	Niels Torre	Italy
bronze medal	Artur Mikołajczewski	Poland

The men's lightweight single sculls competition at the 2023 World Rowing Championships took place at Lake Sava, in Belgrade.

== Schedule ==
The schedule was as follows:

Date	Time	Round
Sunday 3 September 2023	11:08	Heats
Monday 4 September 2023	16:47	Repechages
Wednesday 6 September 2023	12:22	Quarterfinals
Wednesday 6 September 2023	16:12	Final E
Thursday 7 September 2023	12:15	Semifinals A/B
Thursday 7 September 2023	15:25	Semifinals C/D
Friday 8 September 2023	13:05	Final D
Friday 8 September 2023	13:21	Final C
Friday 8 September 2023	13:45	Final B
Friday 8 September 2023	14:05	Final A

All times are Central European Summer Time (UTC+2)

== Results ==
=== Heats ===
The four fastest boats in each heat advanced directly to the quarterfinals. The remaining boats were sent to the repechages.

==== Heat 1 ====
Rank	Rower	Country	Time	Notes
1	Sid Ali Boudina	Algeria	6:55.00	QAD
2	Artur Mikołajczewski	Poland	6:55.60	QAD
3	Lukas Reim	Austria	6:58.74	QAD
4	Marlon Colpaert	Belgium	7:02.93	QAD
5	Jacob McCarthy	Ireland	7:09.73	R
6	Kasper Hirvilampi	Finland	7:18.13	R

==== Heat 2 ====
Rank	Rower	Country	Time	Notes
1	Naoki Furuta	Japan	6:58.36	QAD
2	Baptiste Savaete	France	7:00.84	QAD
3	Rasmus Lind	Denmark	7:02.19	QAD
4	Murray Bales-Smith	South Africa	7:03.99	QAD
5	Ricardo de la Rosa	Mexico	7:07.23	R
6	Ghaith Kadri	Tunisia	7:12.78	R

==== Heat 3 ====
Rank	Rower	Country	Time	Notes
1	Andri Struzina	Switzerland	6:53.47	QAD
2	Samuel Melvin	United States	6:55.17	QAD
3	Mohammed Al-Khafaji	Iraq	7:01.01	QAD
4	Arno Gaus	Germany	7:13.20	QAD
5	Finlay Hamill	New Zealand	7:30.79	R

==== Heat 4 ====
Rank	Rower	Country	Time	Notes
1	Manel Balastegui	Spain	6:58.98	QAD
2	Andrei Fedarenka	Individual Neutral Athletes	7:01.49	QAD
3	Rajko Hrvat	Slovenia	7:06.63	QAD
4	Giorgi Kanteladze	Georgia	7:24.85	QAD
5	Amel Younis	Palestine	7:30.98	R

==== Heat 5 ====
Rank	Rower	Country	Time	Notes
1	Niels Torre	Italy	6:57.63	QAD
2	Péter Galambos	Hungary	7:10.15	QAD
3	Oskar Soedal	Norway	7:21.99	QAD
4	Ziya Mammadzada	Azerbaijan	7:37.93	QAD
5	Hossam Dakhly	Egypt	7:57.66	R

=== Repechages ===
The two fastest boats in repechage advanced to the quarterfinals. The remaining boats were sent to the final E.

==== Repechage 1 ====
Rank	Rower	Country	Time	Notes
1	Jacob McCarthy	Ireland	7:45.34	Q
2	Finlay Hamill	New Zealand	7:49.63	Q
3	Ghaith Kadri	Tunisia	7:52.16	FE
4	Hossam Dakhly	Egypt	8:40.91	FE

==== Repechage 2 ====
Rank	Rower	Country	Time	Notes
1	Ricardo de la Rosa	Mexico	7:35.83	Q
2	Kasper Hirvilampi	Finland	7:55.87	Q
3	Amel Younis	Palestine	8:09.18	FE

=== Quarterfinals ===
The three fastest boats in Quarterfinal advanced to the AB semifinals. The remaining boats were sent to the CD semifinals.

==== Quarterfinal 1 ====
Rank	Rower	Country	Time	Notes
1	Sid Ali Boudina	Algeria	7:37.92	SA/B
2	Naoki Furuta	Japan	7:41.88	SA/B
3	Mohammed Al-Khafaji	Iraq	7:42.38	SA/B
4	Rajko Hrvat	Slovenia	7:44.57	SC/D
5	Kasper Hirvilampi	Finland	7:55.63	SC/D
6	Ziya Mammadzada	Azerbaijan	8:30.91	SC/D

==== Quarterfinal 2 ====
Rank	Rower	Country	Time	Notes
1	Andri Struzina	Switzerland	7:34.42	SA/B
2	Lukas Reim	Austria	7:39.31	SA/B
3	Murray Bales-Smith	South Africa	7:42.33	SA/B
4	Ricardo de la Rosa	Mexico	7:50.98	SC/D
5	Andrei Fedarenka	Individual Neutral Athletes	7:52.07	SC/D
6	Oskar Soedal	Norway	7:54.11	SC/D

==== Quarterfinal 3 ====
Rank	Rower	Country	Time	Notes
1	Artur Mikołajczewski	Poland	7:35.09	SA/B
2	Péter Galambos	Hungary	7:37.02	SA/B
3	Manel Balastegui	Spain	7:39.41	SA/B
4	Rasmus Lind	Denmark	7:39.67	SC/D
5	Arno Gaus	Germany	7:48.83	SC/D
6	Finlay Hamill	New Zealand	8:00.53	SC/D

==== Quarterfinal 4 ====
Rank	Rower	Country	Time	Notes
1	Niels Torre	Italy	7:37.74	SA/B
2	Baptiste Savaete	France	7:39.47	SA/B
3	Samuel Melvin	United States	7:41.90	SA/B
4	Marlon Colpaert	Belgium	7:43.43	SC/D
5	Jacob McCarthy	Ireland	7:59.69	SC/D
6	Giorgi Kanteladze	Georgia	8:03.54	SC/D

=== Semifinals C/D ===
The three fastest boats in each Semifinal advanced to the C final. The remaining boats were sent to the D final.

==== Semifinal 1 ====
Rank	Rower	Country	Time	Notes
1	Rasmus Lind	Denmark	8:00.74	FC
2	Rajko Hrvat	Slovenia	8:04.19	FC
3	Andrei Fedarenka	Individual Neutral Athletes	8:10.33	FC
4	Ziya Mammadzada	Azerbaijan	8:30.79	FD
5	Giorgi Kanteladze	Georgia	8:34.82	FD
6	Jacob McCarthy	Ireland	8:49.89	FD

==== Semifinal 2 ====
Rank	Rower	Country	Time	Notes
1	Marlon Colpaert	Belgium	8:00.85	FC
2	Arno Gaus	Germany	8:02.52	FC
3	Ricardo de la Rosa	Mexico	8:07.05	FC
4	Oskar Soedal	Norway	8:13.60	FD
5	Finlay Hamill	New Zealand	8:26.19	FD
6	Kasper Hirvilampi	Finland	8:56.13	FD

=== Semifinals A/B ===
The three fastest boats in each Semifinal advanced to the A final. The remaining boats were sent to the B final.

==== Semifinal 1 ====
Rank	Rower	Country	Time	Notes
1	Artur Mikołajczewski	Poland	7:44.19	FA
2	Baptiste Savaete	France	7:48.40	FA
3	Lukas Reim	Austria	7:53.75	FA
4	Sid Ali Boudina	Algeria	7:58.75	FB
5	Samuel Melvin	United States	8:04.13	FB
6	Mohammed Al-Khafaji	Iraq	8:32.99	FB

==== Semifinal 2 ====
Rank	Rower	Country	Time	Notes
1	Andri Struzina	Switzerland	7:44.66	FA
2	Niels Torre	Italy	7:50.86	FA
3	Péter Galambos	Hungary	7:57.60	FA
4	Manel Balastegui	Spain	8:04.84	FB
5	Murray Bales-Smith	South Africa	8:08.90	FB
6	Naoki Furuta	Japan	8:15.51	FB

=== Finals ===
The A final determined the rankings for places 1 to 6. Additional rankings were determined in the other finals.

==== Final E ====
Rank	Rower	Country	Time	Total rank
1	Ghaith Kadri	Tunisia	8:14.66	25
2	Amel Younis	Palestine	8:34.18	26
3	Hossam Dakhly	Egypt	8:49.88	27

==== Final D ====
Rank	Rower	Country	Time	Total rank
1	Oskar Soedal	Norway	7:57.81	19
2	Giorgi Kanteladze	Georgia	8:15.64	20
3	Ziya Mammadzada	Azerbaijan	8:21.32	21
4	Kasper Hirvilampi	Finland	8:26.96	22
5	Jacob McCarthy	Ireland	8:28.30	23
	Finlay Hamill	New Zealand	DNS	24

==== Final C ====
Rank	Rower	Country	Time	Total rank
1	Rasmus Lind	Denmark	7:50.83	13
2	Marlon Colpaert	Belgium	7:52.13	14
3	Rajko Hrvat	Slovenia	7:55.35	15
4	Arno Gaus	Germany	7:56.10	16
5	Ricardo de la Rosa	Mexico	8:07.89	17
6	Andrei Fedarenka	Individual Neutral Athletes	8:11.45	18

==== Final B ====
Rank	Rower	Country	Time	Total rank
1	Samuel Melvin	United States	8:02.59	7
2	Manel Balastegui	Spain	8:04.34	8
3	Sid Ali Boudina	Algeria	8:06.17	9
4	Mohammed Al-Khafaji	Iraq	8:07.57	10
5	Murray Bales-Smith	South Africa	8:08.99	11
6	Naoki Furuta	Japan	8:17.33	12

==== Final A ====
Rank	Rower	Country	Time
1st place, gold medalist(s)	Andri Struzina	Switzerland	7:42.41
2nd place, silver medalist(s)	Niels Torre	Italy	7:44.90
3rd place, bronze medalist(s)	Artur Mikołajczewski	Poland	7:47.72
4	Baptiste Savaete	France	7:59.55
5	Péter Galambos	Hungary	8:07.25
6	Lukas Reim	Austria	DNS
