= Rowing at the 2016 Summer Olympics – Men's single sculls =

Men's single sculls at the Games of the XXXI Olympiad
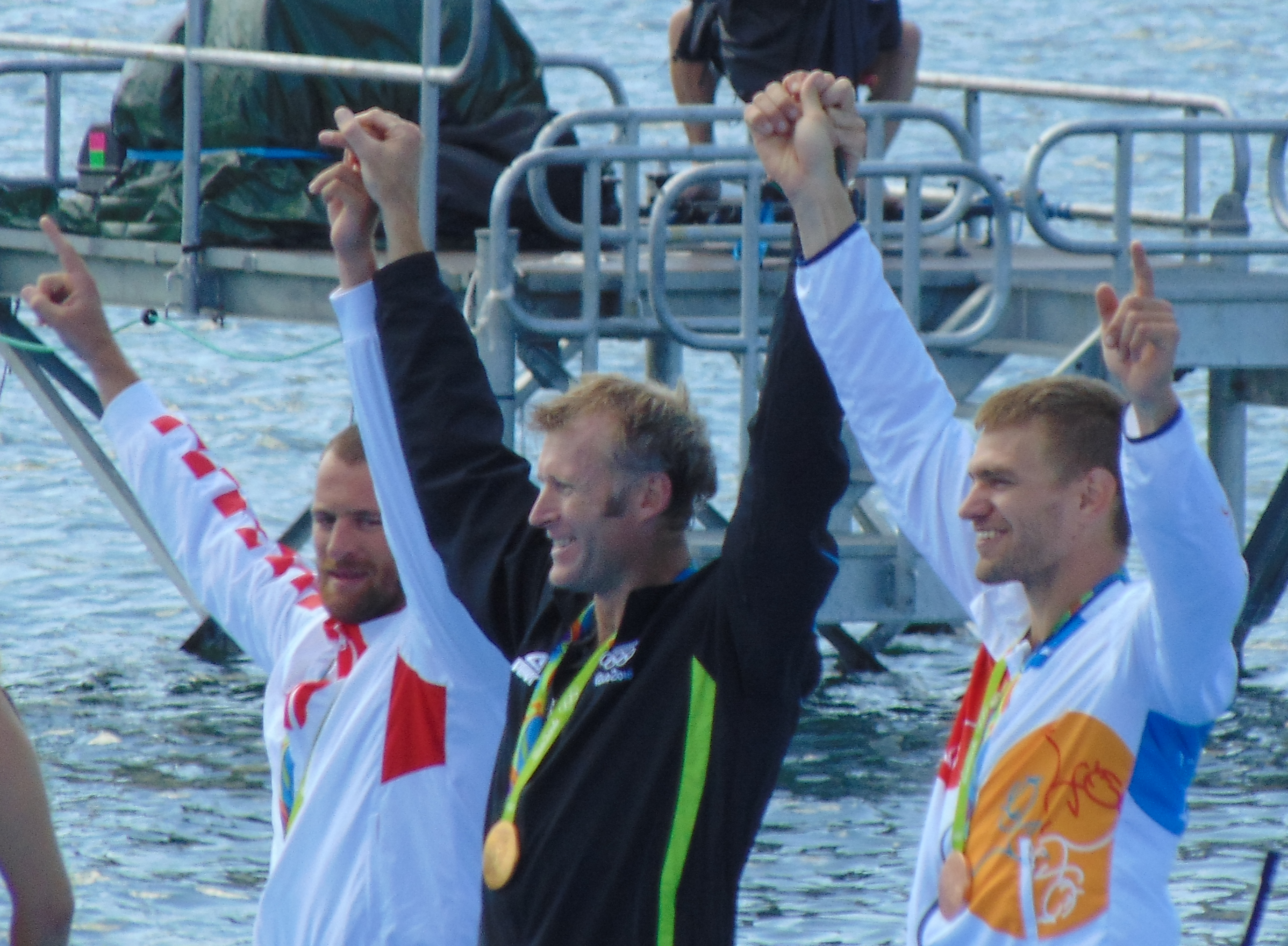
- The medallists: Damir Martin, Mahé Drysdale, and Ondřej Synek
- Venue: Lagoon Rodrigo de Freitas
- Dates: 6–13 August 2016
- Competitors: 32 from 32 nations
- Winning time: 6:41.34

Medalists
1st place, gold medalist(s)		Mahé Drysdale; New Zealand
2nd place, silver medalist(s)		Damir Martin; Croatia
3rd place, bronze medalist(s)		Ondřej Synek; Czech Republic

The men's single sculls competition at the 2016 Summer Olympics in Rio de Janeiro was held from 6 to 13 August at the Lagoon Rodrigo de Freitas. There were 32 competitors from 32 nations. The event was won by Mahé Drysdale of New Zealand, the sixth man to successfully defend an Olympic title in the event. He won an exceptionally close final against Damir Martin of Croatia. Martin's silver was Croatia's first medal in the event. Bronze went to Ondřej Synek of the Czech Republic. Both Drysdale and Synek earned their third medal in the event; Drysdale had taken bronze in 2008 before winning in 2012 and 2016, while Synek had twice been the runner-up in 2008 and 2012 before this third-place finish.

The measurer noted Martin as the winner with photo finish, while Drysdale as second, but then the result was removed. They had the same final time, 6 minutes 41.34 seconds, and the winner, Drysdale, was decided with a photo finish (five thousandths of a second) by judges. The Croatian Olympic Committee disputes the photo finish, and officially requested the International Olympic Committee and International Rowing Federation for an analysis by independent experts of the entire video and photo finish.

== Background ==
This was the 27th appearance of the event. Rowing had been on the programme in 1896 but was cancelled due to bad weather. The single sculls has been held every time that rowing has been contested, beginning in 1900.

Four of the 12 A/B semifinalists from the 2012 Games returned, including the three medallists: gold medallist (and 2008 bronze medallist) Mahé Drysdale of New Zealand, two-time silver medallist Ondřej Synek of the Czech Republic, bronze medallist (and 2008 fifth-place finisher) Alan Campbell of Great Britain, and seventh-place finisher Ángel Fournier of Cuba. The favourites were Synek and Damir Martin of Croatia; Synek had won the three World Championships since the 2012 Games while Martin had won the last two European championships. Drysdale had been World runner-up in 2014 and 2015 as well as adding two more Diamond Challenge Sculls titles.

Belarus, Ecuador, Indonesia, Iraq, Libya, Thailand, and Vanuatu each made their debut in the event. Great Britain made its 22nd appearance, most among nations.

== Qualification ==
Nations had been limited to one boat (one rower) each since 1912. The 32 qualifiers were:

- 9 boats from the 2015 World Championships
- 7 boats from the Asian and Oceanian Qualification Regatta
- 4 boats from the African Qualification Regatta
- 7 boats from the Latin American Qualification Regatta
- 3 boats from the European Qualification Regatta
- 2 invitational boats

== Competition format ==
This rowing event is a single scull event, meaning that each boat is propelled by a single rower. The "scull" portion means that the rower uses two oars, one on each side of the boat; this contrasts with sweep rowing in which each rower has one oar and rows on only one side (not feasible for singles events). The competition consists of multiple rounds. The competition continued to use the five-round format introduced in 2012. Finals were held to determine the placing of each boat; these finals were given letters with those nearer to the beginning of the alphabet meaning a better ranking. Semifinals were named based on which finals they fed, with each semifinal having two possible finals. The course used the 2000 metres distance that became the Olympic standard in 1912.

During the first round six heats were held. The first three boats in each heat advanced to the quarterfinals, while all others were relegated to the repechages.

The repechage was a round which offered rowers a second chance to qualify for the quarterfinals. Placing in the repechage heats determined which quarterfinal the boat would race in. The top two boats in each repechage heat moved on to the quarterfinals, with the remaining boats going to the E/F semifinals.

The quarterfinals were the second round for rowers still competing for medals. Placing in the quarterfinal heats determined which semifinal the boat would race in. The top three boats in each quarterfinal moved on to the A/B semifinals, with the bottom three boats going to the C/D semifinals.

Six semifinals were held, two each of A/B semifinals, C/D semifinals, and E/F semifinals. For each semifinal race, the top three boats moved on to the better of the two finals, while the bottom three boats went to the lesser of the two finals possible. For example, a second-place finish in an A/B semifinal would result in advancement to the A final.

The fourth and final round was the finals. Each final determined a set of rankings. The A final determined the medals, along with the rest of the places through 6th. The B final gave rankings from 7th to 12th, the C from 13th to 18th, and so on. Thus, to win a medal rowers had to finish in the top three of their heat (or top two of their repechage heat), top three of their quarterfinal, and top three of their A/B semifinal to reach the A final.

== Schedule ==
All times are Brasília Time (UTC−3).

Date	Time	Round
Saturday, 6 August 2016	7:30	Heats
Sunday, 7 August 2016	7:30	Repechages
Monday, 8 August 2016	7:30	Semifinals E/F
Tuesday, 9 August 2016	7:30	Quarterfinals
Wednesday, 10 August 2016	10:10	Semifinals C/D
Thursday, 11 August 2016	8:10	Semifinals A/B
Friday, 12 August 2016	7:30; 7:50	Final F Final E
Saturday, 13 August 2016	8:30; 8:50; 9:10; 09:30	Final D Final C Final B Final A

== Results ==
=== Heats ===
The first three of each heat qualified for the quarterfinals, while the remainder went to the repechage.

==== Heat 1 ====
Rank	Rower	Nation	Time	Notes
1	Ángel Fournier	Cuba	7:06.89	Q
2	Juan Carlos Cabrera	Mexico	7:08.27	Q
3	Dattu Baban Bhokanal	India	7:21.67	Q
4	Jaruwat Saensuk	Thailand	7:25.06	R
5	Armandas Kelmelis	Lithuania	7:34.59	R
6	Luigi Teilemb	Vanuatu	8:00.42	R

==== Heat 2 ====
Rank	Rower	Nation	Time	Notes
1	Mahé Drysdale	New Zealand	7:04.45	Q
2	Bendegúz Pétervári-Molnár	Hungary	7:12.86	Q
3	Jhonatan Esquivel	Uruguay	7:16.08	Q
4	Renzo Leon Garcia	Peru	7:21.04	R
5	Mohammed Riyadh	Iraq	7:25.04	R
6	Jakson Vicent Monasterio	Venezuela	7:28.36	R

==== Heat 3 ====
Rank	Rower	Nation	Time	Notes
1	Hannes Obreno	Belgium	7:09.06	Q
2	Natan Węgrzycki-Szymczyk	Poland	7:12.43	Q
3	Brian Rosso	Argentina	7:22.69	Q
4	Shakhboz Kholmirzayev	Uzbekistan	7:25.03	R
5	Al-Hussein Gambour	Libya	7:43.85	R

==== Heat 4 ====
Rank	Rower	Nation	Time	Notes
1	Alan Campbell	Great Britain	7:08.31	Q
2	Stanislau Shcharbachenia	Belarus	7:11.49	Q
3	Memo	Indonesia	7:14.17	Q
4	Kim Dong-yong	South Korea	7:20.85	R
5	Andrew Peebles	Zimbabwe	7:25.39	R

==== Heat 5 ====
Rank	Rower	Nation	Time	Notes
1	Ondřej Synek	Czech Republic	7:21.90	Q
2	Rhys Grant	Australia	7:28.83	Q
3	Arturo Rivarola	Paraguay	7:29.23	Q
4	Sid Ali Boudina	Algeria	7:45.90	R
5	Bryan Sola Zambrano	Ecuador	7:48.77	R

==== Heat 6 ====
Rank	Rower	Nation	Time	Notes
1	Nils Jakob Hoff	Norway	7:17.47	Q
2	Damir Martin	Croatia	7:23.08	Q
3	Abdelkhalek El-Banna	Egypt	7:34.05	Q
4	Mohamed Taieb	Tunisia	7:37.95	R
5	Vladislav Yakovlev	Kazakhstan	7:38.65	R

=== Repechage ===
The first two in each heat qualified for the quarterfinals; the rest went to Semifinals E/F (out of medal contention).

==== Repechage heat 1 ====
Rank	Rower	Nation	Time	Notes
1	Sid Ali Boudina	Algeria	7:20.84	Q
2	Renzo Leon Garcia	Peru	7:25.55	Q
3	Luigi Teilemb	Vanuatu	7:34.12	QEF
4	Al-Hussein Gambour	Libya	7:45.09	QEF
5	Vladislav Yakovlev	Kazakhstan	12:04.17	QEF

==== Repechage heat 2 ====
Rank	Rower	Nation	Time	Notes
1	Kim Dong-yong	South Korea	7:12.96	Q
2	Mohammed Riyadh	Iraq	7:14.38	Q
3	Jaruwat Saensuk	Thailand	7:16.39	QEF
4	Bryan Sola Zambrano	Ecuador	7:28.30	QEF

==== Repechage heat 3 ====
Rank	Rower	Nation	Time	Notes
1	Armandas Kelmelis	Lithuania	7:13.36	Q
2	Shakhboz Kholmirzayev	Uzbekistan	7:14.58	Q
3	Andrew Peebles	Zimbabwe	7:17.19	QEF
4	Mohamed Taieb	Tunisia	7:27.18	QEF
5	Jakson Vicent Monasterio	Venezuela	7:28.67	QEF

=== Quarterfinals ===
The first three of each heat qualified for Semifinals A/B; the remainder went to Semifinals C/D (out of medal contention).

==== Quarterfinal 1 ====
Rank	Rower	Nation	Time	Notes
1	Ángel Fournier	Cuba	6:51.89	QAB
2	Rhys Grant	Australia	6:55.14	QAB
3	Nils Jakob Hoff	Norway	6:57.94	QAB
4	Memo	Indonesia	6:59.76	QCD
5	Kim Dong-yong	South Korea	7:05.69	QCD
6	Shakhboz Kholmirzayev	Uzbekistan	7:09.99	QCD

==== Quarterfinal 2 ====
Rank	Rower	Nation	Time	Notes
1	Mahé Drysdale	New Zealand	6:46.51	QAB
2	Ondřej Synek	Czech Republic	6:50.51	QAB
3	Stanislau Shcharbachenia	Belarus	6:55.19	QAB
4	Brian Rosso	Argentina	7:03.23	QCD
5	Armandas Kelmelis	Lithuania	7:04.67	QCD
6	Renzo Leon Garcia	Peru	7:30.91	QCD

==== Quarterfinal 3 ====
Rank	Rower	Nation	Time	Notes
1	Hannes Obreno	Belgium	6:48.90	QAB
2	Juan Carlos Cabrera	Mexico	6:50.04	QAB
3	Abdelkhalek El-Banna	Egypt	6:50.82	QAB
4	Bendegúz Pétervári-Molnár	Hungary	6:52.80	QCD
5	Sid Ali Boudina	Algeria	7:13.59	QCD
6	Arturo Rivarola	Paraguay	7:17.12	QCD

==== Quarterfinal 4 ====
Rank	Rower	Nation	Time	Notes
1	Damir Martin	Croatia	6:44.44	QAB
2	Alan Campbell	Great Britain	6:49.41	QAB
3	Natan Węgrzycki-Szymczyk	Poland	6:53.52	QAB
4	Dattu Baban Bhokanal	India	6:59.89	QCD
5	Jhonatan Esquivel	Uruguay	7:40.27	QCD
6	Mohammed Riyadh	Iraq	8:29.76	QCD

=== Semifinals ===
The first three of each heat qualify to the better final (E, C, A) while the remainder went to the lower final (F, D, B).

==== Semifinal E/F 1 ====
Rank	Rower	Nation	Time	Notes
1	Jaruwat Saensuk	Thailand	7:54.38	QE
2	Mohamed Taieb	Tunisia	8:02.05	QE
3	Luigi Teilemb	Vanuatu	8:19.15	QE
4	Vladislav Yakovlev	Kazakhstan	11:45.22	QF

==== Semifinal E/F 2 ====
Rank	Rower	Nation	Time	Notes
1	Andrew Peebles	Zimbabwe	7:45.20	QE
2	Jakson Vicent Monasterio	Venezuela	7:50.56	QE
3	Bryan Sola Zambrano	Ecuador	7:52.86	QE
4	Al-Hussein Gambour	Libya	8:13.17	QF

==== Semifinal C/D 1 ====
Rank	Rower	Nation	Time	Notes
1	Jhonatan Esquivel	Uruguay	7:22.98	QC
2	Brian Rosso	Argentina	7:24.65	QC
3	Memo	Indonesia	7:25.60	QC
4	Shakhboz Kholmirzayev	Uzbekistan	7:26.04	QD
5	Sid Ali Boudina	Algeria	7:37.19	QD
6	Arturo Rivarola	Paraguay	7:41.43	QD

==== Semifinal C/D 2 ====
Rank	Rower	Nation	Time	Notes
1	Bendegúz Pétervári-Molnár	Hungary	7:18.88	QC
2	Dattu Baban Bhokanal	India	7:19.02	QC
3	Kim Dong-yong	South Korea	7:20.10	QC
4	Armandas Kelmelis	Lithuania	7:20.72	QD
5	Renzo Leon Garcia	Peru	7:37.34	QD
6	Mohammed Riyadh	Iraq	7:48.31	QD

==== Semifinal A/B 1 ====
Rank	Rower	Nation	Time	Notes
1	Ondřej Synek	Czech Republic	6:58.56	QA
2	Damir Martin	Croatia	6:59.43	QA
3	Ángel Fournier	Cuba	7:02.65	QA
4	Juan Carlos Cabrera	Mexico	7:03.68	QB
5	Abdelkhalek El-Banna	Egypt	7:13.55	QB
6	Nils Jakob Hoff	Norway	7:39.12	QB

==== Semifinal A/B 2 ====
Rank	Rower	Nation	Time	Notes
1	Mahé Drysdale	New Zealand	7:03.70	QA
2	Stanislau Shcharbachenia	Belarus	7:06.69	QA
3	Hannes Obreno	Belgium	7:06.76	QA
4	Alan Campbell	Great Britain	7:09.54	QB
5	Rhys Grant	Australia	7:14.68	QB
6	Natan Węgrzycki-Szymczyk	Poland	7:15.61	QB

=== Finals ===
==== Final F ====
Rank	Rower	Nation	Time
31	Vladislav Yakovlev	Kazakhstan	7:21.61
32	Al-Hussein Gambour	Libya	7:41.77

==== Final E ====
Rank	Rower	Nation	Time
25	Andrew Peebles	Zimbabwe	7:43.98
26	Jaruwat Saensuk	Thailand	7:49.86
27	Mohamed Taieb	Tunisia	7:53.36
28	Bryan Sola Zambrano	Ecuador	7:53.54
29	Jakson Vicent Monasterio	Venezuela	7:57.83
30	Luigi Teilemb	Vanuatu	8:24.67

==== Final D ====
Rank	Rower	Nation	Time
19	Armandas Kelmelis	Lithuania	7:00.72
20	Renzo Leon Garcia	Peru	7:02.28
21	Mohammed Riyadh	Iraq	7:03.73
22	Shakhboz Kholmirzayev	Uzbekistan	7:04.78
23	Sid Ali Boudina	Algeria	7:06.64
24	Arturo Rivarola	Paraguay	7:18.34

==== Final C ====
Rank	Rower	Nation	Time
13	Dattu Baban Bhokanal	India	6:54.96
14	Bendegúz Pétervári-Molnár	Hungary	6:57.75
15	Brian Rosso	Argentina	6:58.58
16	Memo	Indonesia	6:59.44
17	Kim Dong-yong	South Korea	6:59.72
18	Jhonatan Esquivel	Uruguay	7:13.65

==== Final B ====
Rank	Rower	Nation	Time
7	Natan Węgrzycki-Szymczyk	Poland	6:47.95
8	Juan Carlos Cabrera	Mexico	6:50.02
9	Rhys Grant	Australia	6:51.90
10	Abdelkhalek El-Banna	Egypt	6:54.94
11	Nils Jakob Hoff	Norway	7:02.66
—	Alan Campbell	Great Britain	DNS

==== Final A ====
Rank	Rower	Nation	Time	Notes
1st place, gold medalist(s)	Mahé Drysdale	New Zealand	6:41.34	OB
2nd place, silver medalist(s)	Damir Martin	Croatia	6:41.34	
3rd place, bronze medalist(s)	Ondřej Synek	Czech Republic	6:44.10	
4	Hannes Obreno	Belgium	6:47.42	
5	Stanislau Shcharbachenia	Belarus	6:48.78	
6	Ángel Fournier	Cuba	6:55.90	
