= Rowing at the 2022 Asian Games – Men's quadruple sculls =

Men's quadruple sculls at the 2022 Asian Games
- Venue: Fuyang Water Sports Centre
- Date: 20–25 September 2023
- Competitors: 32 from 8 nations

Medalists
gold medal	China; Han Wei, Yi Xudi, Zang Ha, Adilijiang Sulitan
silver medal	Uzbekistan; Shakhzod Nurmatov, Shakhboz Kholmurzaev, Mekhrojbek Mamatkulov, Sobirjon Safaroliev
bronze medal	India; Satnam Singh, Parminder Singh, Jakar Khan, Sukhmeet Singh

The men's quadruple sculls competition at the 2022 Asian Games in Hangzhou, China was held from 20 to 25 September 2023 at the Fuyang Water Sports Centre.

== Schedule ==
All times are China Standard Time (UTC+08:00)

Date	Time	Event
Wednesday, 20 September 2023	16:40	Heats
Thursday, 21 September 2023	15:30	Repechage
Monday, 25 September 2023	10:50	Finals

== Results ==
=== Heats ===
- Qualification: 1 → Final A (FA), 2–4 → Repechage (R)

==== Heat 1 ====
Rank	Team	Time	Notes
1	Uzbekistan (UZB); Shakhzod Nurmatov; Shakhboz Kholmurzaev; Mekhrojbek Mamatkulov; Sobirjon Safaroliev	6:05.12	FA
2	Pakistan (PAK); Muzamil Shahzad; Asad Iqbal; Zahid Iqbal Khan; Amjad Baig	6:19.86	R
3	Indonesia (INA); Ihram; Rendi Setia Maulana; La Memo; Sulpianto	6:20.67	R
4	Hong Kong (HKG); Chen Pak Hong; Jaden Head; Ho Siu Wing; Chan Yuk Man	6:23.89	R

==== Heat 2 ====
Rank	Team	Time	Notes
1	China (CHN); Han Wei; Yi Xudi; Zang Ha; Adilijiang Sulitan	6:01.65	FA
2	India (IND); Satnam Singh; Parminder Singh; Jakar Khan; Sukhmeet Singh	6:16.65	R
3	Vietnam (VIE); Nhữ Đình Nam; Bùi Văn Hoàn; Nguyễn Văn Hà; Nguyễn Văn Hiếu	6:22.66	R
4	Thailand (THA); Chanin Penthongdee; Narongsak Naksaeng; Premanut Wattananusith; Watchara Pangthong	6:27.03	R

=== Repechage ===
- Qualification: 1–4 → Final A (FA), 5–6 → Final B (FB)

Rank	Team	Time	Notes
1	India (IND); Satnam Singh; Parminder Singh; Jakar Khan; Sukhmeet Singh	6:09.94	FA
2	Indonesia (INA); Ihram; Rendi Setia Maulana; La Memo; Sulpianto	6:15.87	FA
3	Vietnam (VIE); Nhữ Đình Nam; Bùi Văn Hoàn; Nguyễn Văn Hà; Nguyễn Văn Hiếu	6:17.52	FA
4	Thailand (THA); Chanin Penthongdee; Narongsak Naksaeng; Premanut Wattananusith; Watchara Pangthong	6:18.13	FA
5	Hong Kong (HKG); Chen Pak Hong; Jaden Head; Ho Siu Wing; Chan Yuk Man	6:24.95	FB
6	Pakistan (PAK); Muzamil Shahzad; Asad Iqbal; Zahid Iqbal Khan; Amjad Baig	6:27.62	FB

=== Finals ===
==== Final B ====
Rank	Team	Time
1	Pakistan (PAK); Muzamil Shahzad; Asad Iqbal; Zahid Iqbal Khan; Amjad Baig	6:27.72
2	Hong Kong (HKG); Chen Pak Hong; Jaden Head; Ho Siu Wing; Chan Yuk Man	6:33.21

==== Final A ====
Rank	Team	Time
1st place, gold medalist(s)	China (CHN); Han Wei; Yi Xudi; Zang Ha; Adilijiang Sulitan	6:02.65
2nd place, silver medalist(s)	Uzbekistan (UZB); Shakhzod Nurmatov; Shakhboz Kholmurzaev; Mekhrojbek Mamatkulov; Sobirjon Safaroliev	6:04.64
3rd place, bronze medalist(s)	India (IND); Satnam Singh; Parminder Singh; Jakar Khan; Sukhmeet Singh	6:08.61
4	Indonesia (INA); Ihram; Rendi Setia Maulana; La Memo; Sulpianto	6:09.75
5	Vietnam (VIE); Nhữ Đình Nam; Bùi Văn Hoàn; Nguyễn Văn Hà; Nguyễn Văn Hiếu	6:22.22
6	Thailand (THA); Chanin Penthongdee; Narongsak Naksaeng; Premanut Wattananusith; Watchara Pangthong	6:30.14
