= Parminder Singh =

Parminder Singh may refer to:

- Parminder Singh (footballer), Indian association football player
- Parminder Singh (rower), Indian rower
- Parminder Singh Dhindsa, Indian politician
- Parminder Singh Dhull, Indian politician
- Parminder Singh Saini, hijacker of the Indian Airlines Flight 405 (1984)
- Parminder Singh Saini (field hockey), Indian-Kenyan field hockey player
