= Hannes Obreno =

Belgian rower (born 1991)

Personal information
- Nationality: Belgian
- Born: 8 March 1991 (age 34) Bruges, Belgium

Sport
- Country: Belgium
- Sport: Rowing
- Event: single scull
- Club: Brugse Trim en Roeiclub

Hannes Obreno (born 8 March 1991 in Bruges) is a Belgian rower.

== Career ==
Obreno competed in the single scull event at the 2016 Summer Olympics, finishing 4th.

In 2016, he won the Diamond Challenge Sculls (the premier event for single sculls) at the Henley Royal Regatta.

== External ==
- Hannes Obreno at World Rowing
- Hannes Obreno at Olympics.com
- Hannes Obreno at Team Belgium (in Dutch)
- Hannes Obreno at Olympedia
