= Rowing at the 2026 Asian Games – Men's single sculls =

Men's single sculls at the 2026 Asian Games
- Venue: Nagaragawa International Regatta Course
- Date: 23–24 September 2026
- Competitors: 10 from 10 nations

Medalists
gold medal	Deng Zhiwei	China
silver medal	Shakhboz Kholmurzaev	Uzbekistan
bronze medal	Tatsuya Sakurama	Japan

The men's single sculls competition at the 2026 Asian Games was held from 23 to 24 September 2026 at the Nagaragawa International Regatta Course, Gifu, Japan.

== Schedule ==
All times are Japan Standard Time (UTC+09:00)

Date	Time	Event
Wednesday, 23 September 2026	09:00	Heats
Thursday, 24 September 2026	08:30	Finals

== Results ==
Legend

- DNS — Did not start

=== Heats ===
- Qualification: 1–2 + next 2 fastest → Final A (FA), Rest → Final B (FB)

==== Heat 1 ====
Rank	Athlete	Time	Notes
1	Shakhboz Kholmurzaev (UZB)	6:48.54	FA
2	Tatsuya Sakurama (JPN)	6:53.10	FA
3	Bahman Nassiri (IRI)	6:58.70	FA
4	Lee Kyeong-hun (KOR)	7:02.95	FB
—	Baker Shihab (IRQ)	DNS	

==== Heat 2 ====
Rank	Athlete	Time	Notes
1	Deng Zhiwei (CHN)	6:45.22	FA
2	Chan Chi Fung (HKG)	6:52.53	FA
3	Balraj Panwar (IND)	6:52.84	FA
4	Cris Nievarez (PHI)	6:59.66	FB
5	Bapan Askhanbek (KAZ)	7:00.52	FB

=== Finals ===
==== Final B ====
Rank	Athlete	Time
1	Lee Kyeong-hun (KOR)	7:01.94
2	Bapan Askhanbek (KAZ)	7:05.21
—	Cris Nievarez (PHI)	DNS

==== Final A ====
Rank	Athlete	Time
1st place, gold medalist(s)	Deng Zhiwei (CHN)	6:38.98
2nd place, silver medalist(s)	Shakhboz Kholmurzaev (UZB)	6:41.83
3rd place, bronze medalist(s)	Tatsuya Sakurama (JPN)	6:46.78
4	Balraj Panwar (IND)	6:54.80
5	Chan Chi Fung (HKG)	7:04.46
6	Bahman Nassiri (IRI)	7:18.49
