= Shakhboz Kholmurzaev =

Uzbekistani rower (born 1996)

Personal information
- Born: 26 February 1996 (age 30) Bekabad, Uzbekistan
- Height: 188 cm (6 ft 2 in)
- Weight: 78 kg (172 lb)
Medal record
Men's rowing
Representing Uzbekistan
Asian Games
Gold medal – first place	2018 Jakarta–Palembang	Double sculls
Silver medal – second place	2022 Hangzhou	Double sculls
Silver medal – second place	2022 Hangzhou	Quadruple sculls
Silver medal – second place	2026 Aichi–Nagoya	Single sculls
Bronze medal – third place	2026 Aichi–Nagoya	Quadruple sculls

Shakhboz Kholmurzaev (Шахбоз Холмурзаев, born 26 February 1996) is an Uzbekistani rower. He placed 22nd in the men's single sculls event at the 2016 Summer Olympics.

He won a gold medal at the 2018 Asian Games in the men's double sculls event.

Kholmurzaev also competed for Uzbekistan at the 2020 Summer Olympics, finishing 16th in the men's lightweight double sculls event.
