= Pascal Lussier =

Canadian rower

Personal information
- Nationality: Canada
- Born: September 13, 1991 (age 34) Saint-Jean-sur-Richelieu, Quebec
- Height: 190 cm (6 ft 3 in)
- Weight: 92 kg (203 lb)
Medal record
Men's rowing
Representing Canada
Pan American Games
Bronze medal – third place	2015 Toronto	Men's double sculls

Pascal Lussier (born September 13, 1991) is a Canadian rower. He won a bronze medal at the 2015 Pan American Games in the men's double sculls event.

In 2016, Lussier qualified for the 2016 Summer Olympics by finishing in second place (and last qualifying position). in the men's quadruple sculls event at the last chance qualification event in Lausanne, Switzerland.
