= Nils Jakob Hoff =

Norwegian rower (born 1985)

Personal information
- Nationality: Norwegian
- Born: 15 February 1985 (age 41) Bergen, Norway
- Height: 1.98 m (6 ft 6 in)
- Weight: 92 kg (203 lb)
- Spouse: Therese Johaug (2023–present)
- Children: 2

Sport
- Country: Norway
- Sport: Rowing
- Event: Double sculls
- Club: Fana Roklubb
Medal record
Men's rowing
Representing Norway
World Championships
Gold medal – first place	2013 Chungju	Double sculls
European Championships
Bronze medal – third place	2012 Varese	Double sculls
Bronze medal – third place	2013 Seville	Double sculls
World Rowing Cup
Gold medal – first place	2012 Oberschleißheim	Double sculls
Bronze medal – third place	2017 Poznań	Quadruple sculls

Nils Jakob Hoff (born 5 February 1985) is a Norwegian retired rower. He is a world champion and two-time European Championships bronze medallist in the double sculls. Hoff won the gold medal at the 2013 World Championships and bronze medals at the European Championships in 2012 and 2013 with Kjetil Borch. He is a two-time Olympian and competed in the men's double sculls at the 2012 Summer Olympics and the men's single sculls at the 2016 Summer Olympics. Hoff retired from rowing in 2019.

== Personal life ==
Hoff is married to cross-country skier and four-time Olympic champion Therese Johaug. Together they have two children.
