= Hamish Harding (rower) =

Australian rower

Personal information
- Born: 15 June 1999 (age 27) Canberra, Australia

Sport
- Country: Australia
- Sport: Rowing
- Club: ANU Boat Club
Medal record
Men's rowing
Representing Australia

Hamish Harding (born 15 June 1999) is an Australian rower who has competed at World Championships.

== Club and state rowing ==
Harding was raised in Canberra. He is the son of Australia's first female World Champion rower Adair Ferguson. Harding's senior club rowing has been from the Australian National University Boat Club.

== International representative rowing ==
In March 2022, Harding was selected in the Australian senior training team to prepare for the 2022 international season and the 2022 World Rowing Championships. He competed in the lightweight men's single scull at both World Rowing Cups in June and July 2022. His World Championship debut was at the 2022 World Rowing Championships at Račice, Czech Republic, where he competed in the men's lightweight single sculls. He made the B final and finished in ninth place overall.
