= Ángel Fournier =

Cuban rower (1987–2023)

Personal information
- Born: Ángel Fournier Rodríguez; 31 December 1987 Guantánamo, Cuba
- Died: 16 March 2023 (aged 35) Dallas, Texas, U.S.

Sport
- Sport: Rowing
Medal record
Men's rowing
Representing Cuba
World Championships
Silver medal – second place	2013 Chungju	Single sculls
Silver medal – second place	2017 Sarasota	Single sculls
Bronze medal – third place	2014 Amsterdam	Single sculls
Pan American Games
Gold medal – first place	2007 Rio de Janeiro	Quadruple sculls
Gold medal – first place	2011 Guadalajara	Single sculls
Gold medal – first place	2015 Toronto	Single sculls
Gold medal – first place	2015 Toronto	Double sculls
Gold medal – first place	2019 Lima	Single sculls
Silver medal – second place	2015 Toronto	Quadruple sculls

Ángel Fournier Rodríguez (31 December 1987 – 16 March 2023) was a Cuban rower. He finished 12th in the quadruple sculls at the 2008 Summer Olympics, 7th in the single sculls at the 2012 Summer Olympics, then took the silver medal at the 2013 World Rowing Championships. He was 6th in the single sculls at the 2016 Summer Olympics, then at the 2017 World Rowing Championships in Sarasota, Florida, he won silver in the single sculls.

Fournier died from a heart attack on 16 March 2023, at the age of 35. He was widely regarded as one of Cuba’s most successful rowers, having represented the country at three Olympic Games and winning multiple medals at World Rowing Championships and Pan American Games.
