= Andrew Peebles =

Zimbabwean rower (born 1989)

Andrew Peebles (born 9 January 1989) is a Zimbabwean rower. He placed 25th in the men's single sculls event at the 2016 Summer Olympics.
