= Bryan Sola Zambrano =

Ecuadorian rower (born 1992)

Bryan Sola Zambrano (born April 3, 1992) is an Ecuadorian rower. He placed 28th in the men's single sculls event at the 2016 Summer Olympics.
