= Luigi Teilemb =

Vanuatuan rower

Personal information
- Nationality: Vanuatu
- Born: 25 February 1992 (age 33)
- Height: 1.87 m (6 ft 1 1/2 in)
- Weight: 70 kg (150 lb)

Sport
- Country: Vanuatu
- Sport: Rowing
- Event: Men's Single Sculls

Luigi Teilemb (born 25 February 1992) is a Vanuatuan rower. He competed for Vanuatu in the 2014 Commonwealth Rowing Championships and 2016 Summer Olympics men's single sculls.
