= Rowing at the 2025 SEA Games =

- Venue: Royal Thai Navy Rowing and Canoeing Training Center, Ambassador City Jomtien Hotel
- Location: Rayong and Sattahip, Chonburi, Thailand
- Dates: 14–19 December 2025

Rowing competitions at the 2025 SEA Games took place at Royal Thai Navy Rowing and Canoeing Training Center in Ban Chang, Rayong for classic events and Ambassador City Jomtien Hotel in Sattahip, Chonburi for coastal events, from 14 to 19 December 2025.

== Medal table ==
* Host nation (Thailand)

| Rank | Nation | Gold | Silver | Bronze | Total |
|---|---|---|---|---|---|
| 1 | Vietnam | 4 | 1 | 1 | 6 |
| 2 | Indonesia | 3 | 3 | 1 | 7 |
| 3 | Thailand* | 2 | 4 | 3 | 9 |
| 4 | Philippines | 1 | 1 | 4 | 6 |
| 5 | Myanmar | 0 | 1 | 1 | 2 |
| Totals (5 entries) | | 10 | 10 | 10 | 30 |

== Medalists ==
=== Men ===
| Event | Gold | Silver | Bronze |
|---|---|---|---|
| Single sculls | Memo; Indonesia | Premanut Wattananusith; Thailand | Cris Nievarez; Philippines |
| Double sculls | Indonesia; Memo; Rendi Setia Maulana | Thailand; Narongsak Naksaeng; Premanut Wattananusith | Philippines; Van Adrian Maxilom; Rynjie Peñaredondo |
| Lightweight pair | Vietnam; Nguyễn Phú; Hoàng Văn Đạt | Indonesia; Aprianto; Ferdiansyah | Thailand; Siwakorn Wongpin; Nawamin Dechudomrat |
| Lightweight quadruple sculls | Indonesia; Ali Mardiansyah; Ardi Isadi; Ihram; Rafiq Wijdan Yasir | Vietnam; Bùi Văn Hoàn; Nguyễn Hữu Thành; Nguyễn Văn Hà; Triệu Hoàng Long | Thailand; Phasin Chueatai; Nawamin Dechudomrat; Yutthana Tamarom; Siwakorn Wongpin |
| Coastal solo | Siripong Chaiwichitchonkul; Thailand | Wai Yan Moe; Myanmar | Cris Nievarez; Philippines |

=== Women ===
| Event | Gold | Silver | Bronze |
|---|---|---|---|
| Double sculls | Philippines; Joanie Delgaco; Kristine Paraon | Thailand; Parisa Chaempudsa; Rawiwan Sukkaew | Vietnam; Nguyễn Thị Vân Anh; Phạm Thị Bích Ngọc |
| Quadruple sculls | Vietnam; Bùi Thị Thu Hiền; Đinh Thị Hảo; Nguyễn Thị Giang; Phạm Thị Huệ | Thailand; Parisa Chaempudsa; Jirakit Phuetthonglang; Matinee Raruen; Rawiwan Sukkaew | Indonesia; Chelsea Corputty; Issa Behuku; Mutiara Rahma Putri; Nurtang |
| Four | Vietnam; Dư Thị Bông; Hà Thị Vui; Lê Thị Hiền; Phạm Thị Ngọc Anh | Indonesia; Aisah Nabila; Andi Reski Rahmawati; Nur Azizah Patwa; Yunita Huby | Thailand; Arisa Chaiya; Natticha Kaewhom; Jirakit Phuetthonglang; Matinee Raruen |
| Lightweight single sculls | Hồ Thị Duy; Vietnam | Joanie Delgaco; Philippines | Ni Lar Win; Myanmar |
| Coastal solo | Parisa Chaempudsa; Thailand | Arni Silva Pattipeiluhu; Indonesia | Kristine Paraon; Philippines |
