= Rowing at the 2010 South American Games – Men's single sculls =

The Men's single sculls event at the 2010 South American Games was held over March 21 at 11:00.

== Medalists ==
Gold	Silver	Bronze
Cristian Ross; Argentina	Jhonatan Esquivel; Uruguay	Ailson Silva; Brazil

== Records ==
World Best Time
World best time	Mahé Drysdale (NZL)	6:35.40	Poznań, Poland	2006

== Results ==
Rank	Rowers	Country	Time
1st place, gold medalist(s)	Cristian Rosso	Argentina	8:03.83
2nd place, silver medalist(s)	Jhonatan Esquivel	Uruguay	8:13.25
3rd place, bronze medalist(s)	Ailson Silva	Brazil	8:18.58
4	Oscar Vasquez Ochoa	Chile	8:29.28
5	Omar Quevedo	Venezuela	8:45.69
6	Pedro Antonio Velasco	Ecuador	9:37.19
