= Rhys Grant =

Australian rower

Personal information
- Born: 6 Feb 1987 (age 39) Subiaco, Western Australia
- Education: Trinity College, Perth

Sport
- Country: Australia
- Sport: Rowing
- Club: West Australian Rowing Club

Achievements and titles
- National finals: King's Cup 2008-2016
Medal record
Men's rowing
Representing Australia

Rhys Grant (born 6 February 1987) is an Australian rower. He is a 2016 Olympian and an Australian national champion from Perth, Western Australia.

== Personal ==
Grant was born in Subiaco, Western Australia and lives in Perth. He attended Trinity College, Perth and completed a B Civil Eng at Curtin University. His father Guy Grant was an Australian representative ice-hockey player between 1979 and 1986.

== Club and national career ==
Grant rows from the West Australian Rowing Club.

On eight occasions in the nine years from 2008 to 2016 Grant was seated in the West Australian men's eight who contested the King's Cup at the Interstate Regatta within the Australian Rowing Championships. He stroked that crew in 2008 and 2009. For six consecutive years from 2011 to 2016 he was also West Australia's representative to contest the interstate men's Single scull - the President's Cup. In 2013 and 2016 he won that event. On five occasions he has rowed in both the King's Cup eight and the single scull in the Interstate Regatta at the Australian Rowing Championships

== International rowing career ==
Grant raced in an Australian men's quad at the 2014 World Rowing Championships in Amsterdam.

On the strength of his 2016 Australian President's Cup win Grant pursued and attained Olympic qualification at the final 2016 European Qualification Regatta at Lucerne. Grant was selected to race for Australia in the single scull at the 2016 Summer Olympics. He won his heat, placed in the quarter-final and finished in fifth place in his semi-final. He finished in third place in the B final for an overall 9th place finish in the Rio 2016 single scull competition.
