= Ondřej Synek =

Czech rower (born 1982)

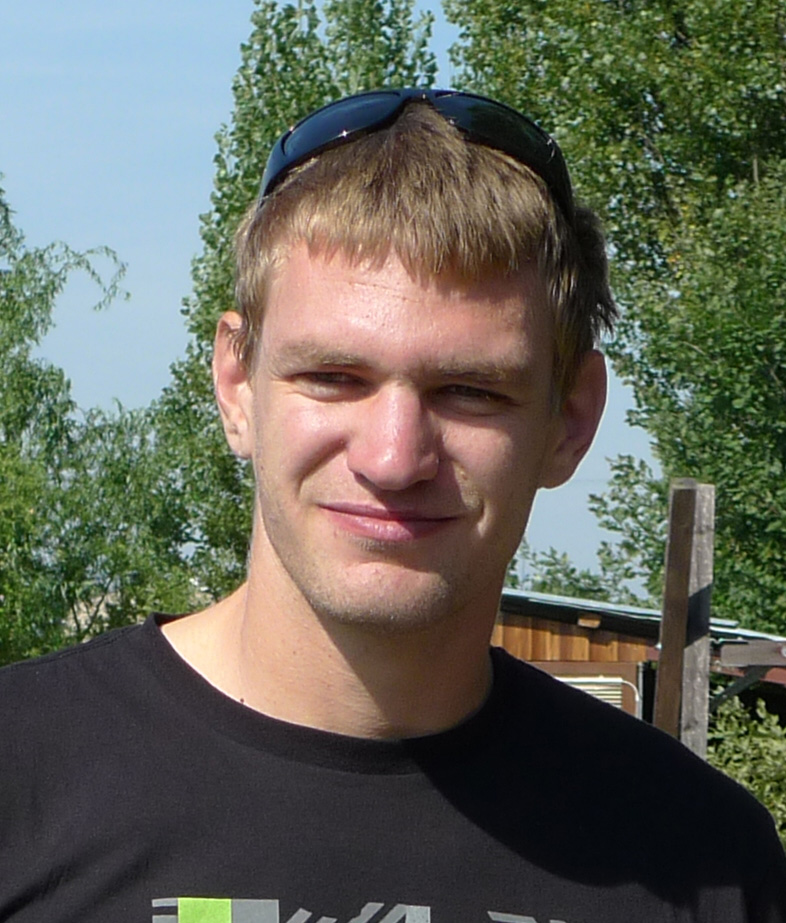
- Synek in 2012

Personal information
- Born: 13 October 1982 (age 43) Stará Boleslav

Sport
- Sport: Rowing
Medal record
Men's rowing
Representing Czech Republic
Olympic Games
Silver medal – second place	2008 Beijing	Single sculls
Silver medal – second place	2012 London	Single sculls
Bronze medal – third place	2016 Rio de Janeiro	Single sculls
World Championships
Gold medal – first place	2010 Karapiro	Single sculls
Gold medal – first place	2013 Chungju	Single sculls
Gold medal – first place	2014 Amsterdam	Single sculls
Gold medal – first place	2015 Aiguebelette	Single sculls
Gold medal – first place	2017 Sarasota	Single sculls
Silver medal – second place	2007 Munich	Single sculls
Silver medal – second place	2011 Bled	Single sculls
Silver medal – second place	2018 Plovdiv	Single sculls
Bronze medal – third place	2003 Milan	Double sculls
Bronze medal – third place	2005 Gifu	Single sculls
Bronze medal – third place	2006 Eton	Single sculls
Bronze medal – third place	2009 Poznań	Single sculls
European Championships
Gold medal – first place	2007 Poznań	Eight
Gold medal – first place	2010 Montemor-O-Velho	Single sculls
Gold medal – first place	2013 Seville	Single sculls
Gold medal – first place	2014 Belgrade	Single sculls
Gold medal – first place	2017 Račice	Single sculls
Silver medal – second place	2015 Poznań	Single sculls
Bronze medal – third place	2016 Brandenburg	Single sculls

Ondřej Synek (Czech pronunciation: [ˈondr̝ɛj ˈsɪnɛk]; born 13 October 1982 in Stará Boleslav) is a Czech former rower. He is a five-time World Champion in Single Sculls, winning in 2010, 2013, 2014, 2015 and 2017. He won Olympic silver medals at the 2008 Summer Olympics in Beijing and 2012 Summer Olympics in London. In Beijing he came in as the chief rival of Mahé Drysdale, but despite Drysdale coming down with a painful stomach flu and falling in the final stages of the final to bronze, he was upset for the gold by defending Olympic Champion Olaf Tufte, who Synek had regularly been beating the previous couple years. In London he was jointly favored for gold with Drysdale after trading gold and silver at the previous two World Championships, but fell short to Drysdale in the final.

In Rio after having won 3 straight World Championships since London, he came in as the clear favorite and had a stated desire to badly want the Olympic Gold. However, he had narrowly missed in both Beijing and London. His quest for Olympic gold failed for a third consecutive time in Rio as he took bronze in the single sculls behind both Drysdale and the surprising Damir Martin. As a five-time World Champion in single sculls, and with a total of 13 World and Olympic single scull medals, he is by far the most successful single sculler in history to not win an Olympic Gold. He confirmed after his Rio defeat to want to take a likely final attempt at the elusive Olympic gold medal in Tokyo 2020, but in June 2021 he announced on his Facebook page that he will not be going to Tokyo. In September 2021 Synek announced his retirement.
