= Siwakorn Wongpin =

Thai rower

Personal information
- Nationality: Thailand
- Born: 29 July 1999 (age 26)

Sport
- Sport: Rowing
Medal record
Rowing
Representing Thailand
Asian Championships
Bronze medal – third place	2021 Ban Chang	Lightweight double sculls
SEA Games
Bronze medal – third place	2025 Thailand	Lightweight pair
Bronze medal – third place	2025 Thailand	Lightweight quadruple sculls

Siwakorn Wongpin (born 29 July 1999) is a Thai rower. He competed in the 2020 Summer Olympics.
