= Juan Carlos Cabrera =

Mexican rower (born 1991)

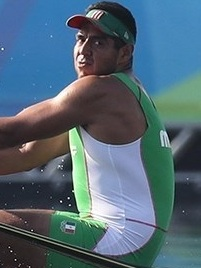
- Cabrera at the 2016 Summer Olympics

Personal information
- Nationality: Mexican
- Born: 9 November 1991 (age 34)
- Died: December 2025
- Height: 1.94 m (6 ft 4 in)
- Weight: 105 kg (231 lb)

Sport
- Country: Mexico
- Sport: Rowing
Medal record
Men's rowing
Representing Mexico
Pan American Games
Silver medal – second place	2019 Lima	Single sculls

Juan Carlos Cabrera Pérez (Note: In this Spanish name, the first or paternal surname is Cabrera and the second or maternal family name is Pérez.) (9 November 1991 – December 2025) was a Mexican competitive rower.

He competed at the 2016 Summer Olympics in Rio de Janeiro, in the men's single sculls.

Cabrera Pérez's death was reported in late December 2025 by the Mexican Rowing Federation (FMR).
