= Renzo León García =

Peruvian rower

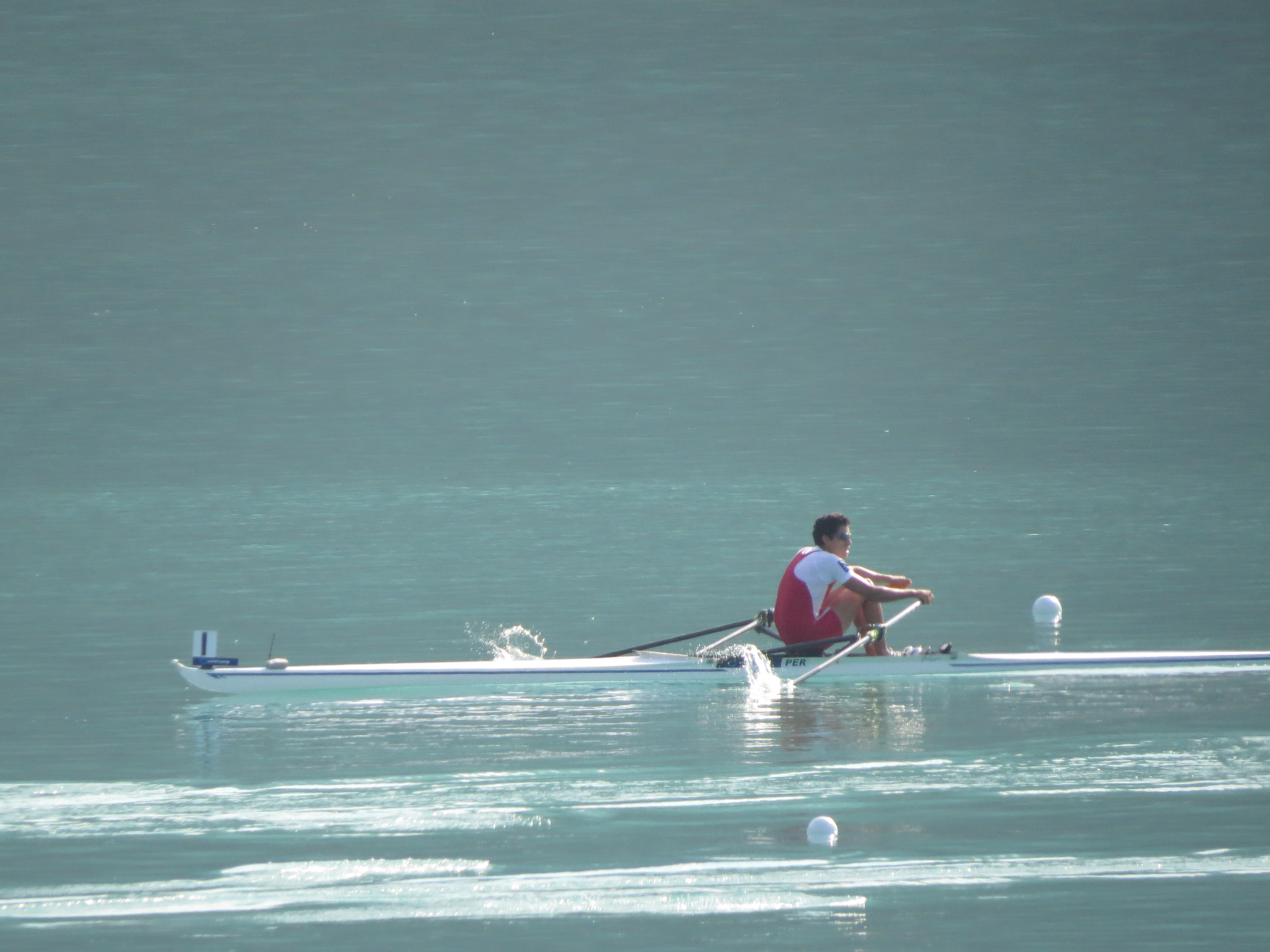
- García at 2015 World Championships

Personal information
- Born: 14 August 1990 (age 34); Lima, Peru

Sport
- Sport: Rowing

Renzo León García (born August 14, 1990) is a Peruvian rower. He placed 20th in the men's single sculls event at the 2016 Summer Olympics.
