= Jakson Vicent Monasterio =

Venezuelan rower

Personal information
- Born: 31 December 1991 (age 34) Sucre, Venezuela

Sport
- Sport: Rowing
Medal record
Representing Venezuela
Central American and Caribbean Games
Bronze medal – third place	2014 Veracruz	Double sculls
Bronze medal – third place	2014 Veracruz	Lightweight double sculls

Jakson Vicent Monasterio (born December 31, 1991) is a Venezuelan rower. He placed 29th in the men's single sculls event at the 2016 Summer Olympics.
