= Jakar Khan =

Indian rower (born 1998)

Personal information
- Nationality: Indian
- Born: 18 June 1998 (age 28)
- Height: 1.90 m (6 ft 3 in)
Medal record
Men's rowing
Representing India
Asian Games
Bronze medal – third place	2022 Hangzhou	Quadruple sculls

Jakar Khan (Hindi: जाकर खान, born 18 June 1998) is an Indian rower from Rajasthan. He participated as part of the Indian rowing team at the 2022 Asian Games at Hangzhou, China. He competes in the men's quadruple sculls. He was part of the team that won the bronze medal in the men's quadruple sculls at the Asian Games in Hangzhou, China.

== Career ==
- 2023: In September, he won a bronze medal as part of the Indian teams in the men's quadruple sculls at the 2022 Asian Games.
- 2022: Men's quadruple sculls in the Rowling World Cup at Poznan.
- 2022: Men's quadruple sculls in the Rowing World Cup, Belgrade.
- 2022: Men's doubles sculls in the Asian Championships, Rayong, Thailand.
- 2021: Men's quadruple sculls in the Asian Championships, Rayong, Thailand.
- 2019: Men's quadruple sculls in the Asian Championships, Chungju, Korea.
