= Natan Węgrzycki-Szymczyk =

Polish rower (born 1995)

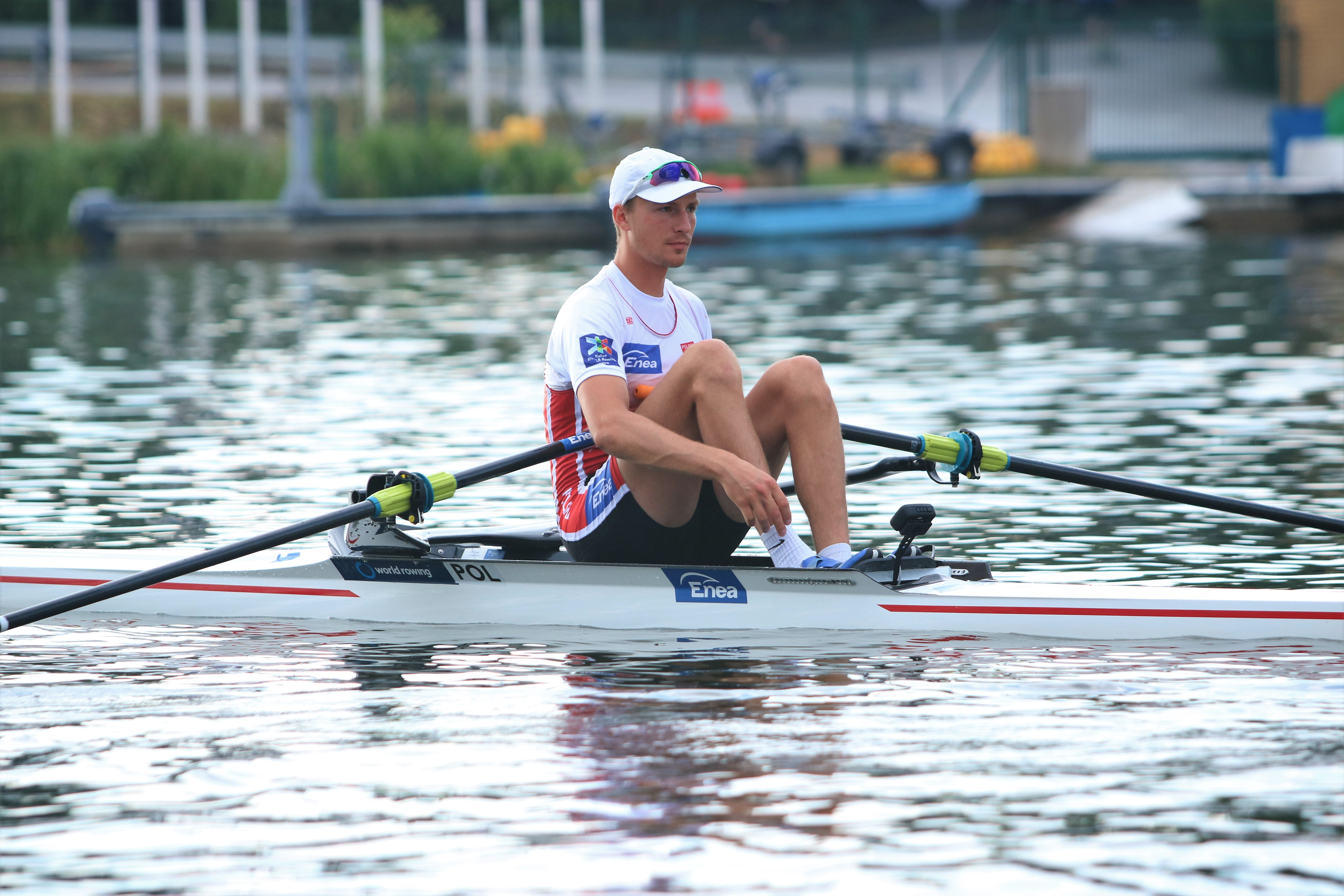
- Natan Węgrzycki-Szymczyk in 2019.

Personal information
- Nationality: Polish
- Born: 5 January 1995 (age 31) Kraków, Poland
- Height: 6 ft 8 in (2.03 m)

Sport
- Sport: Rowing

Natan Węgrzycki-Szymczyk (ˈnatan vɛŋˈɡʒɨt͡ski ˈʃɨmʈ͡ʂɨk; born 5 January 1995) is a Polish competitive rower.

He competed at the 2016 Summer Olympics in Rio de Janeiro, in the men's single sculls.

He was in the stroke seat of the winning Cambridge Light Blue boat in the 2019 Boat Race.
