= Rajko Hrvat =

Slovenian rower

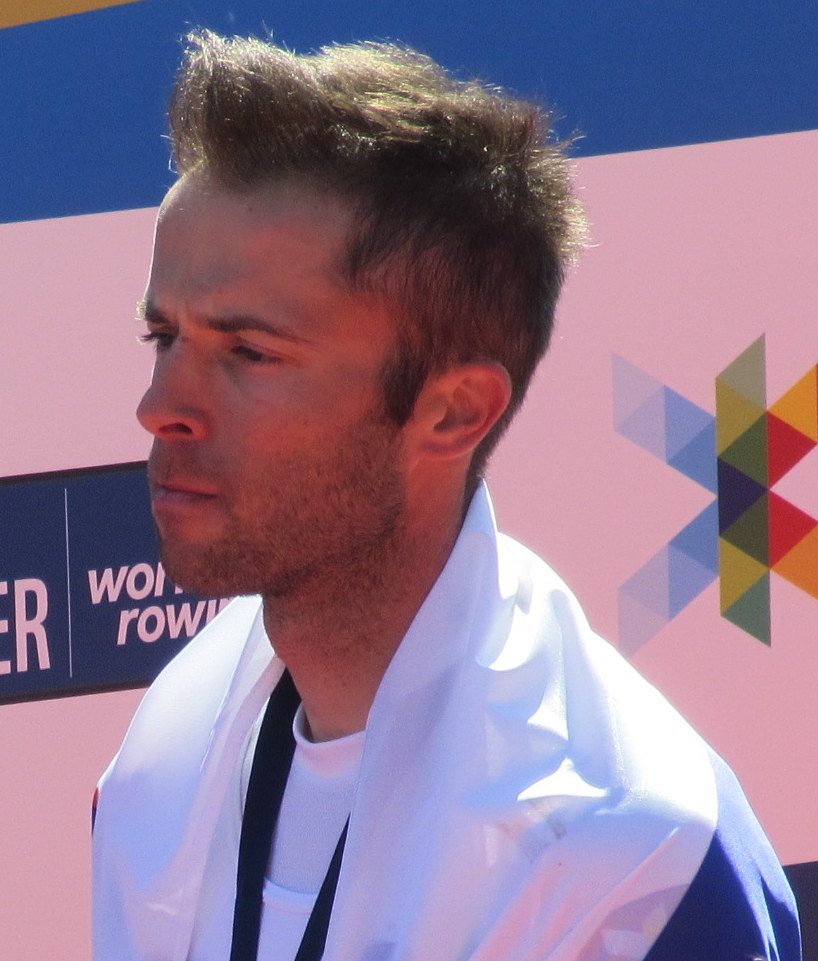
- Rajko Hrvat in 2016
Medal record
Men's rowing
Representing Slovenia
World Championships
Silver medal – second place	2015 Aiguebelette	Lwt single sculls
Bronze medal – third place	2022 Račice	Lwt single sculls
European Championships
Bronze medal – third place	2015 Poznań	Lwt single sculls
Bronze medal – third place	2016 Brandenburg	Lwt single sculls

Rajko Hrvat (born 25 September 1986) is a Slovenian rower. He won the silver medal in the men's lightweight single scull at the 2015 World Rowing Championships.
