= Vladislav Ryabtsev =

Russian rower

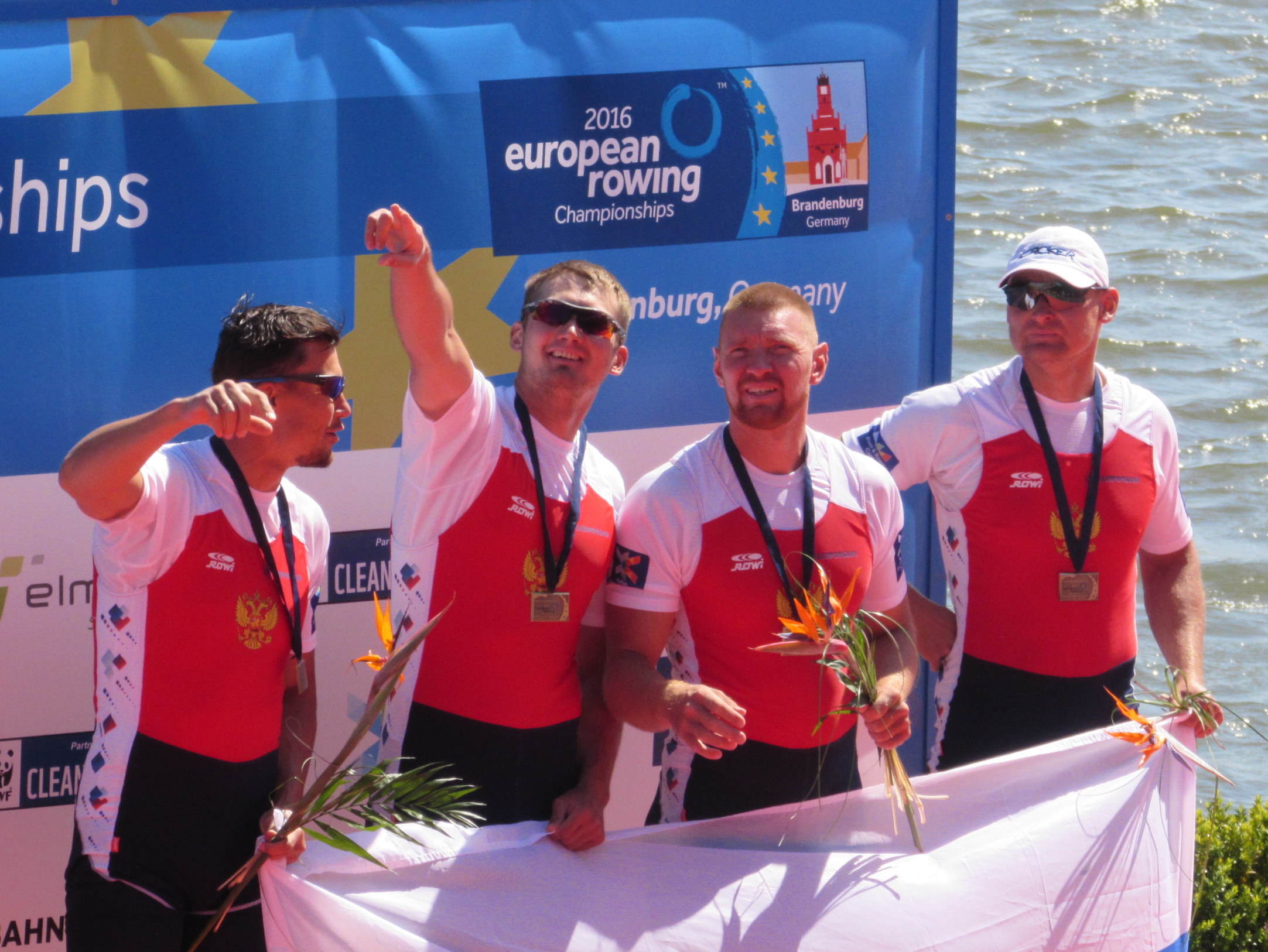

Personal information
- Born: 13 December 1987 (age 38) Sortavala, Russia
- Height: 194 cm (6 ft 4 in)
- Weight: 97 kg (214 lb)

Sport
- Sport: Rowing
Medal record
Representing Russia
European Championships
| Gold medal – first place | 2015 Poznan | Quadruple sculls |

Vladislav Vadimovich Ryabtsev (Russian: Владислав Вадимович Рябцев, born 13 December 1987) is a Russian rower. Competing in quadruple sculls he won the European title in 2015 and placed eighth at the 2012 Summer Olympics. He was disqualified from competing at the 2016 Olympics in the quadruple sculls after his teammate Sergey Fedorovtsev failed a drug test in 2016, but subsequently allowed to compete in the Games when Russia was allowed to rearrange their eligible oarsmen into the one remaining crew.
