= Premanut Wattananusith =

Thai rower (born 1995)

Personal information
- Native name: เปรมณัช วัฒนานุสิทธิ์
- Born: June 4, 1995 (age 31) Thailand
- Height: 1.87 m (6 ft 2 in)
- Weight: 72 kg (159 lb)

Sport
- Country: Thailand
- Sport: Rowing
Medal record
Men's Rowing
Representing Thailand
Southeast Asian Games
Silver medal – second place	2025 Thailand	Men's single sculls

Premanut Wattananusith (Thai: เปรมณัช วัฒนานุสิทธิ์; born 4 June 1995) is a Thai rower. He represented Thailand at the 2024 Summer Olympics in Paris and 2025 SEA Games.

Wattananusith made his first appearance at the 2023 World Rowing Cup I in Zagreb, competing in the men's single sculls. The following year, he represented Thailand at the 2024 Summer Olympics in Paris. He placed 30th in the men's single sculls. At the 2025 Southeast Asian Games, he won two silver medals in the men's single sculls and the men's double sculls alongside Narongsak Naksaeng.
