= Brian Rosso =

Argentine rower

Personal information
- Born: 16 August 1987 (age 38) Mar del Plata, Argentina

Sport
- Country: Argentina
- Sport: Rowing

Achievements and titles
- Olympic finals: Rio 2016
Medal record
Men's rowing
Representing Argentina
Pan American Games
Gold medal – first place	2019 Lima	Quadruple sculls
Bronze medal – third place	2015 Toronto	Single sculls
Bronze medal – third place	2015 Toronto	Quadruple sculls
Bronze medal – third place	2019 Lima	Single sculls

Brian Rosso (born August 16, 1987) is an Argentine rower. He placed 15th in the men's single sculls event at the 2016 Summer Olympics.
