= Mohammed Al-Khafaji =

Iraqi rower (born 1994)

Mohammed Riyadh Jasim Al-Khafaji (born 20 February 1994 in Baghdad) is an Iraqi rower. He placed 21st in the men's single sculls event at the 2016 Summer Olympics in Rio and 22nd at the 2020 Summer Olympics in Tokio, making Al-Khafaji the most successful Iraqi athlete to compete in the Tokyo Olympic Games.

Mostly competing in the lightweight category, Al-Khafaji has been regularly among the top 10 male rowers in the single sculls in Asia and among the top 20 worldwide, marked by the 10th place in the men's lightweight single sculls at the 2023 World Rowing Championships in Belgrade. In addition, he has competed in the men's double, lightweight double and quadruple categories.
