= Parminder Singh (rower) =

Indian rower

Personal information
- Nationality: Indian
- Born: 6 February 2000 (age 26) Bilaspur Yamuna Nagar, Haryana, India
- Occupation: Rower
- Height: 200 cm (6 ft 7 in)
- Military career
- Allegiance: India
- Branch: Indian Navy
- Service years: 2022–present
- Rank: Chief Petty Officer

Sport
- Sport: Rowing
Medal record
Representing India
Asian Games
Bronze medal – third place	2022 Hangzhou	Quadruple sculls
Asian Championship
Gold medal – first place	2019 Bangkok	Single sculls
Gold medal – first place	2019 Bangkok	Double sculls
Silver medal – second place	2019 Bangkok	Mix four
Silver medal – second place	2021 Thailand	Single sculls
National Championship
Gold medal – first place	2023 Pune	Double sculls
Gold medal – first place	2023 Pune	Quadruple sculls
National Championship Sprint
Gold medal – first place	2023 Pune	Double sculls

Parminder Singh (born 6 February 2000) is an Indian rower from Haryana, He was selected as part of the Indian team for the rowing competitions in the 2022 Huangzhou Asian Games. He was part of the team that won the bronze medal in the men's quadruple sculls.

== Early life and background ==
Parminder Singh hails from Yamunanagar in Haryana. He is the son of former Indian rower Inderpal Singh. His father has won a medal in the men's coxless four at the Asian Games in Busan in 2002. They joined a rare club of father-and-son pairs who won a medal in Asian Games. Inderpal is now a coach of the Indian team. Parminder is a product of College of Military Engineering, Pune, which hosts the Army Rowing Node.

== Career ==
- 2023: In September, he won a Bronze medal as part of the Indian team in the men's quadruple sculls at the 2022 Asian Games.
- December 2021: He won silver at the Asian Rowing Championships in Thailand in the single sculls.
