= Stanislau Shcharbachenia =

Belarusian rower

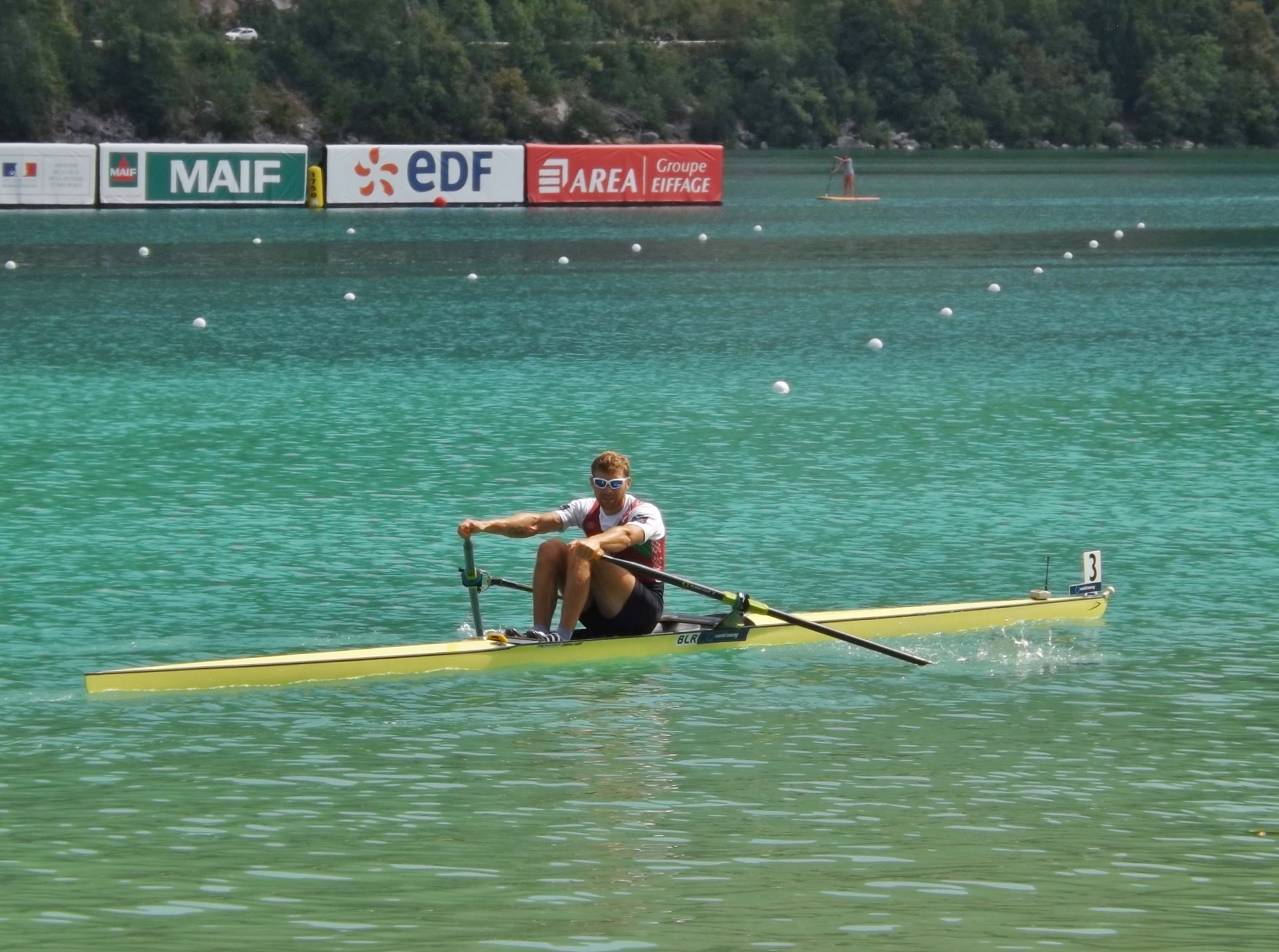

Personal information
- Born: 5 March 1985 (age 41) Babruysk, Byelorussian SSR, Soviet Union
- Height: 201 cm (6 ft 7 in)
- Weight: 104 kg (229 lb)

Sport
- Sport: Rowing
Medal record
Men's rowing
Representing Belarus
World Rowing Championships
Gold medal – first place	2012 Plovdiv	Coxed pair
European Rowing Championships
Bronze medal – third place	2007 Poznań	Quad scull
Silver medal – second place	2009 Brest	Quad scull
Silver medal – second place	2011 Plovdiv	Coxless four
Bronze medal – third place	2017 Račice	Single scull

Stanislau Shcharbachenia (born 5 March 1985) is a Belarusian rower. He competed at four Olympic Games from 2004 to 2016.
