= Sid Ali Boudina =

Algerian rower (born 1990)

Personal information
- National team: Algeria
- Born: May 7, 1990 (age 36) Algiers, Algeria

Sport
- Country: Algeria
- Sport: Rowing
- Partner: Kamel Ait Daoud

Sid Ali Boudina (born May 7, 1990) is an Algerian rower. He competed at the 2016 Summer Olympics in the men's single sculls event, in which he placed 23rd.

He represented Algeria at the 2020 Summer Olympics in the Men's Lightweight Double Sculls with partner Kamel Ait Daoud. They finished in 17th place.
