= Arturo Rivarola =

Paraguayan rower (born 1989)

Personal information
- Born: 2 November 1989 (age 35); Asunción, Paraguay

Sport
- Sport: Rowing

Arturo Enrique Rivarola Trappe (born November 2, 1989) is a Paraguayan rower. He placed 24th in the men's single sculls event at the 2016 Summer Olympics. He is the brother of Rocio Rivarola, who is also a rower.
