= Kim Dong-yong =

South Korean rower (born 1990)

Kim Dong-yong (born 12 December 1990 in Sancheong) is a South Korean rower. At the 2012 Summer Olympics, he finished in 22nd place in the men's single sculls. He placed 17th in the men's single sculls event at the 2016 Summer Olympics.
