= Lotscher =

Lotscher, Lötscher, or Loetscher may refer to:

- Frederick W. Loetscher Sr. (1875–1966), American church historian
- Lefferts Loetscher (1904–1981), American church historian
- Ila Loetscher (1904–2000), American aviatrix
- Frederick W. Loetscher Jr. (1913–2006), American ornithologist
- Walter Lötscher (1923–2013), Swiss skier
- Hugo Loetscher (1929–2009), Swiss writer
- Peter Lötscher (1941–2017), Swiss fencer
- Kevin Lotscher (born 1988), Swiss ice hockey player
- Flavia Lötscher (born 2004), Swiss rower
- Lisa Lötscher (born 2000), Swiss rower
