= American Society of Church History =

Learned society

- Abbreviation: ASCH
- Formation: 1888; 138 years ago
- Founder: Philip Schaff
- Founded at: New York City, New York, US
- Type: Learned society
- Region served: United States
- Field: Ecclesiastical history
- Members: 1,600 (2020)
- President: Daniel Ramírez
- Executive secretary: Caleb Maskell
- Affiliations: American Council of Learned Societies; American Historical Association
- Revenue: $260,753 (2018–19)
- Expenses: $188,354 (2018–19)
- Endowment: $483,408 (2019)
- Website: churchhistory.org

The American Society of Church History (ASCH) was founded in 1888 with the disciplines of Christian denominational and ecclesiastical history as its focus. Today the society's interests include the broad range of the critical scholarly perspectives, as applied to the history of Christianity and its relationship to surrounding cultures in all periods, locations, and contexts. The society was founded by Philip Schaff.

The ASCH records are housed at the Presbyterian Historical Society in Philadelphia, Pennsylvania. On behalf of the ASCH, Cambridge University Press publishes the quarterly academic journal Church History: Studies in Christianity and Culture, which was established in 1932. The journal is regarded as highly authoritative in its field, and is compared to the British Journal of Ecclesiastical History.

== Presidents ==
- 1888: Philip Schaff
- 1932: William Warren Sweet
- 1933: Conrad Henry Moehlman
- 1934: Frederick William Loetscher
- 1935: John T. McNeill
- 1936: Wilhelm Pauck
- 1937: Herbert Schneider
- 1938: Reuben E. E. Harkness
- 1939: Charles Lyttle
- 1940: Roland Bainton
- 1941: F. W. Buckler
- 1942: E. R. Hardy Jr.
- 1943: Harold S. Bender
- 1944: Percy V. Norwood
- 1945: Kenneth Scott Latourette
- 1946: Matthew Spinka
- 1947: Ernest G. Schwiebert
- 1949: Massey H. Shepherd
- 1950: James Hastings Nichols
- 1951: Ray C. Petry
- 1953: Sidney Mead
- 1954: Carl E. Schneider
- 1955: L. J. Trinterud
- 1956: Quirinus Breen
- 1957: H. Shelton Smith
- 1958: George Huntston Williams
- 1959: Robert T. Handy
- 1960: Jerald C. Brauer
- 1961: Harold J. Grimm
- 1962: Lefferts A. Loetscher
- 1963: Raymond W. Albright
- 1964: Albert C. Outler
- 1965: Jaroslav Pelikan
- 1966: John Van Rohr
- 1967: Richard Cameron
- 1968: Elwyn Smith
- 1969: John Tracy Ellis
- 1970: Robert M. Grant
- 1971: Martin E. Marty
- 1972: Carl Bangs
- 1973: William A. Clebsch
- 1974: Clyde L. Manschreck
- 1975: Sydney E. Ahlstrom
- 1976: John F. Wilson
- 1977: Lewis W. Spitz
- 1978: Edwin S. Gaustad
- 1979: Brian A. Gerrish
- 1980: Robert M. Kingdon
- 1981: William R. Hutchison
- 1982: C. C. Goen
- 1983: Jane Dempsey Douglass
- 1984: Henry W. Bowden
- 1985: David C. Steinmetz
- 1986: Winton U. Solberg
- 1987: Jay P. Dolan
- 1988: William J. Courtenay
- 1989: Elizabeth A. Clark
- 1990: Timothy L. Smith
- 1991: Richard L. Greaves
- 1992: George Marsden
- 1993–1994: Nathan O. Hatch
- 1994–1995: Stephen J. Stein
- 1995–1996: Bernard McGinn
- 1996–1997: Barbara Brown Zikmund
- 1997–1998: Richard Kieckhefer
- 1998–1999: Peter W. Williams
- 1999–2000: Ronald L. Numbers
- 2000–2001: Hans J. Hillerbrand
- 2001–2002: Amanda Porterfield
- 2002–2003: E. Brooks Holifield
- 2003–2004: Dale A. Johnson
- 2004–2005: Dennis Dickerson
- 2005–2006: Mark Noll
- 2006–2007: Jan Shipps
- 2007–2008: John Van Engen
- 2008–2009: Grant Wacker
- 2009–2010: Charles H. Lippy
- 2010–2011: Richard P. Heitzenrater
- 2011–2012: Barbara Newman
- 2012–2013: Laurie F. Maffly-Kipp
- 2013–2014: Bruce Hindmarsh
- 2014–2015: Thomas F. X. Noble
- 2015–2016: Margaret Bendroth
- 2016–2017: Ronald Rittgers
- 2017–2018: Candy Gunther Brown
- 2018–2019: Ralph Keen
- 2019: Paul C. H. Lim
- 2020: Daniel Ramírez
- 2021–2022: Anthea Butler
- 2023: Jonathan Ebel
- 2024: Esther Chung-Kim
- 2025: Timothy Larsen
- 2026: Elesha Coffman
