= Books & Culture =

Defunct American Christian book review journal

- Editor: John Wilson
- Categories: Literary magazines, Christianity
- Frequency: Bimonthly
- Format: Tabloid
- Circulation: 11,000
- First issue: September 1995
- Final issue Number: November 2016; Vol 22 No 6
- Company: Christianity Today International
- Country: United States
- Based in: Carol Stream, Illinois
- Language: English
- Website: www.booksandculture.com
- ISSN: 1082-8931
- OCLC: 32609725

Books & Culture: A Christian Review (B&C) was a bimonthly book review journal published by Christianity Today International from 1995 to 2016. The journal was launched a year after the publication of The Scandal of the Evangelical Mind by Mark A. Noll, and it sought to address that scandal by providing a vehicle for Christian intellectual engagement with ideas and culture, modeled on the New York Review of Books. It was launched and subsidized through its early years with the help of grants from the Pew Charitable Trusts. John Wilson edited the publication and Noll and Philip Yancey served as cochairs of the editorial board.

While the publisher and the majority of Books & Culture's writers were evangelical, the magazine was not limited to evangelical perspectives. "Roman Catholics, Anglicans, Eastern Orthodox Christians, Jews, and a few nonbelievers" could be found among the publication's contributors, according to the New York Times. In 2000, Alan Wolfe observed in The Atlantic that "In addition to evangelicals, figures as diverse as the economist Glenn C. Loury; the historian Eugene Genovese; Richard Bernstein, of New School University; and the novelist Larry Woiwode have written for the magazine, which has featured interviews with Stanley Crouch, Adam Michnik, and Francis Fukuyama."

Journalist Richard N. Ostling called Books & Culture "American religion's classiest highbrow magazine". It was considered "the leading journal of evangelical Protestant engagement with the scholarly disciplines and the arts" and enjoyed a loyal following among both self-styled evangelical intellectuals and the wider publishing industry, but it was never financially self-sustaining. In 2013 it narrowly avoided closure through a Twitter-driven fundraising push that secured sufficient donations and pledges to keep the magazine afloat into the following year and beyond. Wilson speculated in an interview after the closure was announced that it might have been easier to attract donors if the magazine had functioned as "sort of a culture war vehicle," but that had never been the vision of the publication.

In the Books & Culture podcast, Wilson regularly highlighted other periodicals that he believed would appeal to readers of Books & Culture, including The Other Journal, The Englewood Review of Books, and Image. Commentators discussing the demise of Books & Culture identified these and other publications that might be considered successors to the journal, such as Mars Hill Audio Journal, Touchstone, and Sojourners. In December 2016, it was announced that Wilson would be editing a new publication starting in spring 2017 called Education & Culture; that online-only review ceased publication in October 2017.
