= Sarah McKay =

British rower (born 1997)

Personal information
- Born: 7 August 1997 (age 29)

Sport
- Sport: Rowing
Medal record
Women's rowing
Representing Great Britain
World Championships
Silver medal – second place	2025 Shanghai	Quadruple sculls
European Championships
Gold medal – first place	2025 Plovdiv	Quadruple sculls

Sarah McKay (born 7 August 1997) is a British rower. Competing in the quadruple sculls, she won a gold medal at the 2025 European Championships and a silver medal at the 2025 World Championships.

== Early life ==
From Stockport, McKay studied nursing at the University of Liverpool, and having qualified as an oncology nurse she moved to Chester, England. She joined Grosvenor Rowing Club, where she was coached by Paul Turner. In September 2024, she took a sabbatical from nursing to pursue rowing full-time with the Leander Club.

== Career ==
McKay won the single sculls at the GB trials in February 2025, winning ahead of Lola Anderson.

McKay won the gold medal making her senior debut for Great Britain at the 2025 European Rowing Championships in Plovdiv in the women's quadruple sculls alongside Anderson, Becky Wilde and Cam Nylaand, with the four winning the event in a European Championship best time.

She won the silver medal at the 2025 World Rowing Championships in Shanghai in the women's quadruple sculls with Anderson, Wilde and Hannah Scott, finishing runner-up to the boat from the Netherlands.

In May 2026, alongside Scott, Anderson and Finnola Stratton, she was part of the British woman's quadruple sculls boat who finished second in the World Rowing Cup I event in Seville, Spain.
