= Frederick W. Loetscher =

Frederick W. Loetscher may refer to

- Frederick W. Loetscher Sr. (1875–1966), church historian, father of the below
- Frederick W. Loetscher Jr. (1913–2006), ornithologist, son of the above
