= Finnola Stratton =

British rower (born 2003)

Personal information
- Born: 12 June 2003 (age 23)
- Education: University of Reading

Sport
- Sport: Rowing
- Club: Avon County Rowing Club
Medal record
Women's rowing
Representing Great Britain
World Championships
Silver medal – second place	2026 Amsterdam	Quadruple sculls
World U23 Championships
Gold medal – first place	2025 Poznań	W4x
Bronze medal – third place	2024 St. Catharines	W4x

Finnola Stratton (born 12 June 2003) is a British international rower. She was a gold medalist in the women's quadruple sculls at the 2025 World U23 Championships, making her senior international debut for Great Britain the following year in the World Rowing Cup.

== Career ==
Stratton took up rowing at the age of 12 years-old at Avon County Rowing Club.

Stratton won a bronze medal in the women's quadruple sculls at the 2024 World Rowing U23 Championships alongside Megan Knight, Lily Abbott and Ellie Cooke. The following year, she upgraded that to a gold medal at the 2025 World Rowing U23 Championships in Poznań, alongside Ellie Cooke, Poppy Baker and Olivia Cheesmur. That year, she also won the single sculls at the British Universities and Colleges Sport (BUCS) Championships, and joined the senior British squad that November, having won the women's single sculls at the GB Rowing Team Open Trial.

In May 2026, she was part of the British quadruple sculls alongside Hannah Scott, Lola Anderson and Sarah McKay who finished second in the World Rowing Cup I event in Seville, Spain on her senior international debut, with the boat also winning the third and final World Cup regatta of the 2026 season in Lucerne. In August 2026, she won the silver medal at the 2026 World Rowing Championships in Amsterdam in the quadruple sculls.

== Personal life ==
Stratton grew-up near Bristol and studied at Reading University from 2021. She is of Northern Ireland descent, with her maternal family from County Antrim. Her mother Cathy (nee Herbison) was a champion three-day eventer for Ireland.
