= BBZ (disambiguation) =

Bluebird Aviation is a regional airline based in Nairobi, Kenya.

BBZ may also refer to:

- "BBZ", a single by Claudia Bouvette
- Barbara Brown Zikmund (born 1939), American historian of religion
- First Capital Bank Zimbabwe Limited, formerly Barclays Bank of Zimbabwe; a bank in Zimbabwe
- Zambezi Airport, Zimbabwe (IATA code)
- Hypsostromataceae (Catalogue of Life identifier)
- Berliner Börsen-Zeitung, a former German newspaper
- A retired ISO 639-3 for Babalia Creole Arabic
