= 2024 WRC =

2024 WRC may refer to:

- 2024 World Rally Championship
- 2024 World Ringette Championships
- 2024 World Rowing Championships
- 2024 World Rowing Cup
