= Martin E. Marty =

American Lutheran religious scholar (1928–2025)

The Reverend Martin E. Marty
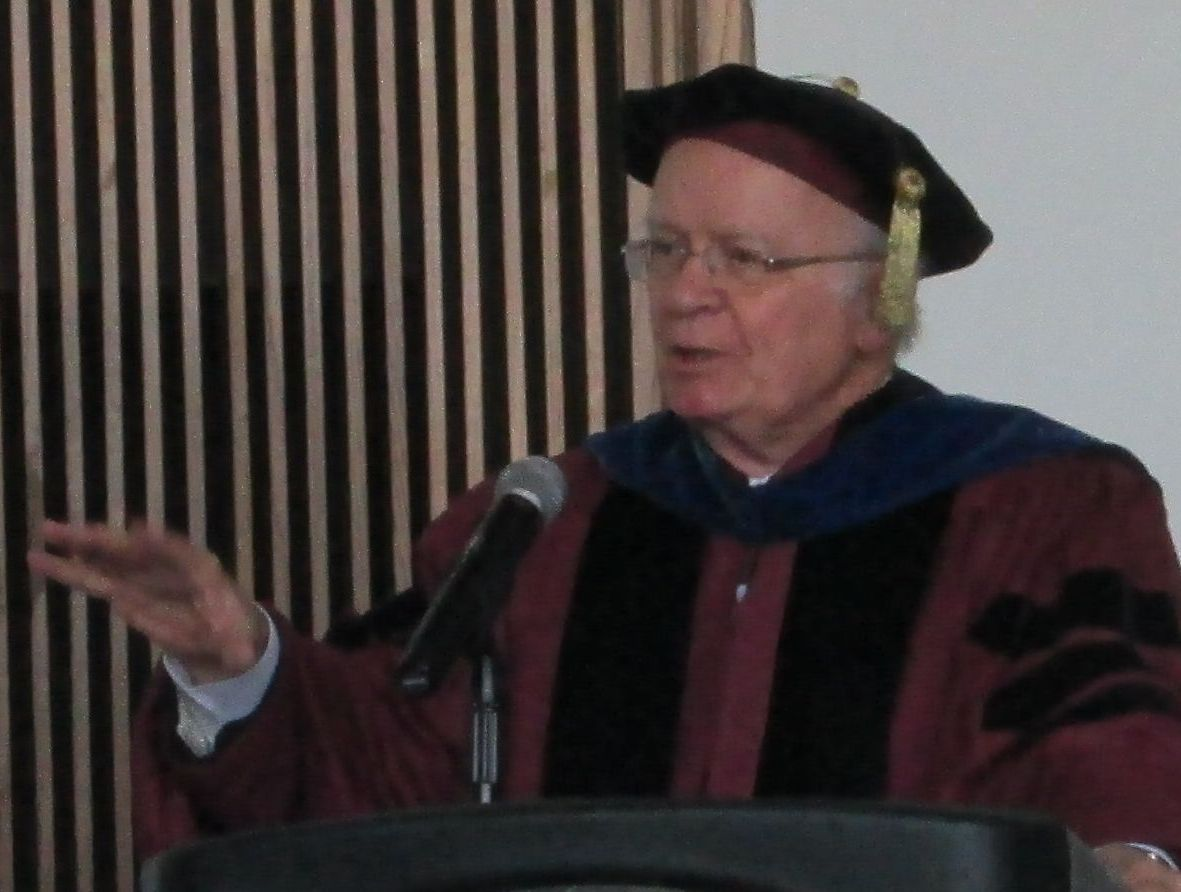
- Marty speaking in 2013
- Born: Martin Emil Marty; February 5, 1928; West Point, Nebraska, US
- Died: February 25, 2025 (aged 97); Minneapolis, Minnesota, US
- Spouses: Elsa Marty (m. 1952; died 1981); Harriet Marty (m. 1982)
- Awards: National Humanities Medal (1997); Order of Lincoln (1998)

Ecclesiastical career
- Religion: Protestant (Lutheran)
- Church: Lutheran Church–Missouri Synod; Evangelical Lutheran Church in America
- Ordained: 1952

Academic background
- Education: Concordia Seminary; Chicago Lutheran Theological Seminary; University of Chicago
- Thesis: The Uses of Infidelity (1956)

Academic work
- Discipline: History; religious studies; theology
- Sub-discipline: History of religion
- Institutions: University of Chicago
- Doctoral students: R. Scott Appleby; M. Craig Barnes; Jonathan Butler; Jay P. Dolan; Vincent Harding; Marvin S. Hill; Jeffrey Kaplan; James R. Lewis; Joseph M. McShane; Paul C. Pribbenow; Jerry Sittser; John G. Stackhouse Jr.; Winnifred Fallers Sullivan
- Notable works: Righteous Empire (1970)
- Notable ideas: Public theology

Martin Emil Marty (February 5, 1928 – February 25, 2025) was an American Lutheran religious scholar who wrote extensively on religion in the United States.

== Life and career ==
=== Early life ===
Marty was born on February 5, 1928, in West Point, Nebraska, to Emil, a parochial school teacher and organist, and Anne Louise (Wuerdemann) Marty. Raised in Iowa and Nebraska, he was a member of the Lutheran Church–Missouri Synod and was educated a Lutheran preparatory school, then at Concordia College in Milwaukee, Wisconsin and Concordia Seminary of St. Louis, Missouri. Marty completed masters level work at the Lutheran School of Theology at Chicago through 1954, and received a Doctor of Philosophy degree from the University of Chicago in 1956. He served as a Lutheran pastor from 1952 to 1967 in the suburbs of Chicago.

=== Career ===
In 1958, Marty planted The Lutheran Church of the Holy Spirit in Elk Grove Village, Illinois. Though Marty became a founding influence in the Evangelical Lutheran Church in America, Holy Spirit was planted within the Lutheran Church – Missouri Synod and remains a member church of the Lutheran Church – Missouri Synod.

In 1962, Life magazine included Marty among "One Hundred of the Most Important Young Men and Women in the United States" in a special issue focused on what they termed "The Take-Over Generation". Marty was cited as "a penetrating, outspoken critic of suburban church life in America," who served as associate editor of The Christian Century and led "the fastest growing Lutheran parish in the country".

From 1963 to 1998, Marty taught at the University of Chicago Divinity School, eventually holding an endowed chair, the Fairfax M. Cone Distinguished Service Professorship. His more than 130 doctoral advisees at the University of Chicago included M. Craig Barnes, Jonathan M. Butler, Vincent Harding, Jeffrey Kaplan, James R. Lewis, and John G. Stackhouse Jr.

Marty served as president of the American Academy of Religion, the American Society of Church History, and the American Catholic Historical Association. He was the founding president and later the George B. Caldwell Scholar-in-Residence at the Park Ridge Center for the Study of Health, Faith, and Ethics. He served on two US presidential commissions and was director of both the Fundamentalism Project of the American Academy of Arts and Sciences and the Public Religion Project at the University of Chicago sponsored by the Pew Charitable Trusts. He served at St. Olaf College in Northfield, Minnesota, from 1988 as Regent, Board Chair, Interim President in late 2000, and since 2002 as Senior Regent.

Marty retired on his seventieth birthday. He held emeritus status at the University of Chicago; he served as Robert W. Woodruff Visiting Professor of Interdisciplinary Studies at Emory University 2003–2004. His first wife, Elsa L. Schumacher died in 1981, and in 1982, he married Harriet J. Meyer. He had seven children (including two foster children), among whom are John Marty, a Minnesota state senator, and Peter Marty, who hosted the ELCA radio ministry Grace Matters from 2005 to 2009 and is now publisher of The Christian Century magazine and senior pastor of St. Paul Lutheran Church in Davenport, Iowa.

Marty died on February 25, 2025, at the age of 97.

== Awards, accolades, and honors ==
Marty received numerous honors, including the National Humanities Medal, the Medal of the American Academy of Arts and Sciences, the University of Chicago Alumni Medal, the Distinguished Service Medal of the Association of Theological Schools, and 80 honorary doctorates. In 1991, Marty was awarded an honorary Doctor of Humane Letters (LHD) degree from Whittier College. The Martin E. Marty Award for the Public Understanding of Religion is named for Marty and has been awarded annually since 1996.

Named in his honor on his 70th birthday in 1979, the Martin Marty Center for the Advanced Study of Religion is the University of Chicago Divinity School's institute for interdisciplinary research in all fields of the academic study of religion. He was an elected member of the American Antiquarian Society and of the American Philosophical Society and was the Mohandas M. K. Gandhi Fellow of the American Academy of Political and Social Science.

Marty was inducted as a Laureate of The Lincoln Academy of Illinois and awarded the Order of Lincoln (the State's highest honor) by the Governor of Illinois in 1998 in the field of Religion.

== Works ==
=== Overview ===
Marty published an authored book and an edited book for every year he was a full-time professor. He maintained that authorial pace for the first decade of his retirement, slowing only in the second. His dozens of published books include Righteous Empire: The Protestant Experience in America (1970), for which he won the National Book Award in category Philosophy and Religion; the encyclopedic five-volume Fundamentalism Project, co-edited with historian R. Scott Appleby, formerly his dissertation advisee; and the biography Martin Luther (2004). He was a columnist for The Christian Century magazine, contributing a column in every issue for 36 years (1972-2008), and served as its associate editor for fifty years, beginning in 1956. He also edited the biweekly Context newsletter from 1969 until 2010, and wrote a weekly column distributed electronically as "Sightings" by the Martin Marty Center at the University of Chicago Divinity School. In addition, he has authored over 5,000 articles and many more incidental pieces, encyclopedia entries, forewords, and the like.

=== Bibliography ===
==== Author ====
- The New Shape of American Religion (1958) New York: Harper and Brothers
- A Short History of Christianity, The World Publishing Company, Cleveland, Ohio (1959)
- Righteous Empire: The Protestant Experience in America (1970), Harper Torchbook 1977 paperback: ISBN 0-06-131931-7, Charles Scribner's Sons & Collier Macmillan Pub. 1986 rev. ed.: ISBN 0-02-376500-3
- Protestantism (1972) Garden City, New York: Image Books. ISBN 0-385-07610-X
- The Public Church: Mainline-Evangelical-Catholic (1981) New York: Crossroads. ISBN 0-8245-0019-9
- A Cry of Absence, Reflections for the Winter of the Heart, (1983) Harper & Row, ISBN 0-06-065434-1
- Pilgrims in Their Own Land: 500 Years of Religion in America (1984) New York: Penguin. ISBN 0-14-00-8268-9
- Modern American Religion. Chicago: University of Chicago Press.
  - Volume 1: The Irony of It All, 1893–1919 (1986) ISBN 0-226-50893-5
  - Volume 2: The Noise of Conflict, 1919–1941 (1990) ISBN 0-226-50895-1
  - Volume 3: Under God, Indivisible, 1941–1960 (1996) ISBN 0-226-50899-4
- Religion and Republic: The American Circumstance (1987) Boston: Beacon Press. ISBN 0-8070-1206-8
- The Glory and the Power: The Fundamentalist Challenge to the Modern World. (1992) Beacon. Boston, Massachusetts.ISBN 0-807-01216-5
- The One and the Many: America's Struggle for the Common Good (1997) Harvard University Press. Cambridge, Massachusetts. ISBN 0-674-63827-1
- Martin Luther (The Penguin Lives Series). New York: Viking (2004) ISBN 0-670-03272-7
- The Protestant Voice in American Pluralism. Aphens, Ga; London: University of Georgia Press. 2004. ISBN 0-8203-2580-5.
- Dietrich Bonhoeffer's Letters and Papers From Prison: A Biography (2011) Princeton University Press. Princeton, New Jersey. ISBN 978-0-69113-921-0
- October 31, 1517: Martin Luther and the Day that Changed the World (2016) Paraclete Press. Brewster, Massachusetts. ISBN 978-1-61261-656-8

==== Book chapters ====
- Martin E. Marty. "Half a Life in Religious Studies: Confessions of an 'Historical Historian'." pp. 151–174 in The Craft of Religious Studies, edited by Jon R. Stone. New York: St. Martin's Press, 1998.
- Martin E. Marty, "Locating Jay P. Dolan," in The American Catholic Experience: Essays in Honor of Jay P. Dolan (Catholic University of America Press, 2001), pp. 99–108 online

==== Articles and monographs ====
- Marty, Martin E. "Fundamentalism Reborn: Faith and Fanaticism." Saturday Review. May 1980, 37–42.
- Marty, Martin E. "Fundamentalism as a Social Phenomenon." Bulletin of the American Academy of Arts and Sciences 42 (November 1988): 15–29.
- Marty, Martin E. "Too Bad We're So Relevant: The Fundamentalism Project Projected". The Bulletin of the American Academy of Arts and Sciences 49 (March 1996): 22–38.

==== Editor ====
- The Place of Bonhoeffer: Problems and possibilities in his thought, Association Press, 1962.
- The Fundamentalism Project, Martin E. Marty and R. Scott Appleby, Series Editors
  - Fundamentalisms Observed. The Fundamentalism Project, vol. 1. Chicago, Il; London: University of Chicago Press. 1991. ISBN 0-226-50878-1.
  - Fundamentalisms and Society: Reclaiming the Sciences, the Family, and Education. The Fundamentalism Project, vol. 2. Chicago, Il; London: University of Chicago Press. 1993. ISBN 0-226-50880-3.
  - Fundamentalisms and the State: Remaking Polities, Economies, and Militance. The Fundamentalism Project, vol. 3. Chicago, Il; London: University of Chicago Press. 1993. ISBN 0-226-50883-8.
  - Accounting for Fundamentalisms: The Dynamic Character of Movements. The Fundamentalism Project, vol. 4. Chicago, Il; London: University of Chicago Press. 1994. ISBN 0-226-50885-4.
  - Fundamentalisms Comprehended. The Fundamentalism Project, vol. 5. Chicago, Il; London: University of Chicago Press. 1995. ISBN 0-226-50887-0.
- Hizmet Means Service: Perspectives on an Alternative Path Within Islam, University of California Press (2015). ISBN 9780520285187

== See also ==
- Franz Bibfeldt (fictitious theologian promoted by Marty)

Academic offices
Preceded by Wolfhart Pannenberg	Ingersoll Lecturer on Human Immortality; 1984	Succeeded by Robert Jay Lifton
Professional and academic associations
Preceded by Robert M. Grant	President of the American; Society of Church History; 1971	Succeeded by Carl Bangs
Preceded by John Dillenberger	President of the American Academy of Religion; 1988	Succeeded by Robert Wilken
Awards
Preceded by Erik Erikson	National Book Award for Philosophy and Religion; 1972	Succeeded by Sydney E. Ahlstrom
Preceded by Marshall Sahlins	Gordon J. Laing Award; 1998	Succeeded by André LaCocque
Preceded by Marshall Sahlins	Gordon J. Laing Award; 1998	Succeeded by Paul Ricœur
