= 2026 World Rowing Championships – Women's quadruple sculls =

Women's quadruple sculls at the 2026 World Rowing Championships
- Venue: Bosbaan
- Location: Amsterdam, Netherlands
- Dates: 25–29 August
- Competitors: 56 from 14 nations
- Winning time: 6:08.18

Medalists
gold medal	Marieke Keijser; Lisa Bruijnincx; Margot Leeuwenburgh; Tessa Dullemans	Netherlands
silver medal	Lola Anderson; Hannah Scott; Finnola Stratton; Imogen Grant	Great Britain
bronze medal	Kristi Wagner; Evan Park; Sophia Vitas; Emily Kallfelz	United States

The women's quadruple sculls competition at the 2026 World Rowing Championships took place at Bosbaan, in Amsterdam.

== Schedule ==
The schedule was as follows:

Date	Time	Round
Tuesday, 25 August 2026	15:09	Heats
Thursday, 27 August 2026	15:33	Final C
Thursday, 27 August 2026	16:47	Semifinals
Saturday, 29 August 2026	11:55	Final B
Saturday, 29 August 2026	13:39	Final A

All times are Central European Summer Time (UTC+2)

== Results ==
=== Heats ===
The two fastest boats in each heat and the six fastest times advanced to the semifinals. Other crews to Final C.

==== Heat 1 ====
Rank	Rower	Country	Time	Notes
1	Lola Anderson; Hannah Scott; Finnola Stratton; Imogen Grant	Great Britain	6:57.45	SF
2	Roxana Anghel; Gabriela Tivodariu; Andrada-Maria Moroșanu; Iulia-Liliana Balauca	Romania	7:01.74	SF
3	Shaye de Paiva; Marilou Duvernay-Tardif; Kristen Siermachesky; Katie Clark	Canada	7:05.68	SF
4	Veronica Wall; Rebecca Leigh; Olivia Hay; Stella Clayton-Greene	New Zealand	7:15.50	FC
5	Barbara Stepien; Anna Khlibenko; Zuzanna Lesner; Zuzanna Jasińska	Poland	7:17.87	FC

==== Heat 2 ====
Rank	Rower	Country	Time	Notes
1	Marieke Keijser; Lisa Bruijnincx; Margot Leeuwenburgh; Tessa Dullemans	Netherlands	6:51.34	SF
2	Romy Cantwell; Jean Mitchell; Annabelle McIntyre; Emily Sheppard	Australia	6:54.58	SF
3	Milla Massemin; Violaine Aernoudts; Margaux Bailleul; Claire Bové	France	6:57.08	SF
4	Maren Völz; Juliane Faralisch; Johanna Debus; Frauke Hundeling	Germany	6:59.92	SF
5	Zoi Fitsiou; Eleni Diavati; Varvara Lykomitrou; Christina Bourmpou	Greece	7:02.43	SF

==== Heat 3 ====
Rank	Rower	Country	Time	Notes
1	Nina Wettstein; Flavia Lötscher; Célia Dupré; Lisa Lötscher	Switzerland	6:51.55	SF
2	Kristi Wagner; Evan Park; Sophia Vitas; Emily Kallfelz	United States	6:51.60	SF
3	Isobel Clements; Sophia Young; Alison Bergin; Emily Hegarty	Ireland	6:59.16	SF
4	Xu Yixi; Li Yan; Han Mengyao; Jiao Siyu	China	6:41.84	SF

=== Semifinals ===
The three fastest boats in each heat advance to the Final A. The remaining boats were sent to the Final B.

==== Semifinal 1 ====
Rank	Rower	Country	Time	Notes
1	Marieke Keijser; Lisa Bruijnincx; Margot Leeuwenburgh; Tessa Dullemans	Netherlands	6:22.91	FA
2	Lola Anderson; Hannah Scott; Finnola Stratton; Imogen Grant	Great Britain	6:25.52	FA
3	Romy Cantwell; Jean Mitchell; Annabelle McIntyre; Emily Sheppard	Australia	6:27.43	FA
4	Isobel Clements; Sophia Young; Alison Bergin; Emily Hegarty	Ireland	6:28.94	FB
5	Xu Yixi; Li Yan; Han Mengyao; Jiao Siyu	China	6:32.87	FB
6	Zoi Fitsiou; Eleni Diavati; Varvara Lykomitrou; Christina Bourmpou	Greece	6:37.32	FB

==== Semifinal 2 ====
Rank	Rower	Country	Time	Notes
1	Kristi Wagner; Evan Park; Sophia Vitas; Emily Kallfelz	United States	6:20.41	FA
2	Roxana Anghel; Gabriela Tivodariu; Andrada-Maria Moroșanu; Iulia-Liliana Balauca	Romania	6:23.15	FA
3	Maren Völz; Juliane Faralisch; Johanna Debus; Frauke Hundeling	Germany	6:24.38	FA
4	Nina Wettstein; Flavia Lötscher; Célia Dupré; Lisa Lötscher	Switzerland	6:25.72	FB
5	Milla Massemin; Violaine Aernoudts; Margaux Bailleul; Claire Bové	France	6:27.03	FB
6	Shaye de Paiva; Marilou Duvernay-Tardif; Kristen Siermachesky; Katie Clark	Canada	6:36.54	FB

=== Finals ===
The A final determined the rankings for places 1 to 6. Additional rankings were determined in the other finals.

==== Final C ====
Rank	Rower	Country	Time	Total rank
1	Barbara Stepien; Anna Khlibenko; Zuzanna Lesner; Zuzanna Jasińska	Poland	6:41.85	13
2	Veronica Wall; Rebecca Leigh; Olivia Hay; Stella Clayton-Greene	New Zealand	6:45.61	14

==== Final B ====
Rank	Rower	Country	Time	Notes
1	Nina Wettstein; Flavia Lötscher; Célia Dupré; Lisa Lötscher	Switzerland	6:13.73	7
2	Milla Massemin; Violaine Aernoudts; Margaux Bailleul; Claire Bové	France	6:15.22	8
3	Isobel Clements; Sophia Young; Alison Bergin; Emily Hegarty	Ireland	6:18.56	9
4	Xu Yixi; Li Yan; Han Mengyao; Jiao Siyu	China	6:24.58	10
5	Shaye de Paiva; Marilou Duvernay-Tardif; Kristen Siermachesky; Katie Clark	Canada	6:28.31	11
6	Zoi Fitsiou; Eleni Diavati; Varvara Lykomitrou; Christina Bourmpou	Greece	6:30.65	12

==== Final A ====
Rank	Rower	Country	Time
1st place, gold medalist(s)	Marieke Keijser; Lisa Bruijnincx; Margot Leeuwenburgh; Tessa Dullemans	Netherlands	6:08.18
2nd place, silver medalist(s)	Lola Anderson; Hannah Scott; Finnola Stratton; Imogen Grant	Great Britain	6:09.78
3rd place, bronze medalist(s)	Kristi Wagner; Evan Park; Sophia Vitas; Emily Kallfelz	United States	6:10.33
4	Romy Cantwell; Jean Mitchell; Annabelle McIntyre; Emily Sheppard	Australia	6:18.04
5	Roxana Anghel; Gabriela Tivodariu; Andrada-Maria Moroșanu; Iulia-Liliana Balauca	Romania	6:19.30
6	Maren Völz; Juliane Faralisch; Johanna Debus; Frauke Hundeling	Germany	6:22.59
