= 2025 World Rowing Championships – Women's quadruple sculls =

Women's quadruple sculls at the 2025 World Rowing Championships
- Venue: Dianshan Lake
- Location: Shanghai, China
- Dates: 21–25 September
- Competitors: 48 from 12 nations
- Winning time: 6:32.92

Medalists
gold medal	Lisa Bruijnincx; Margot Leeuwenburgh; Willemijn Mulder; Tessa Dullemans	Netherlands
silver medal	Sarah McKay; Hannah Scott; Lola Anderson; Rebecca Wilde	Great Britain
bronze medal	Sarah Wibberenz; Frauke Hundeling; Lisa Gutfleisch; Pia Greiten	Germany

The women's quadruple sculls competition at the 2025 World Rowing Championships took place at Dianshan Lake, in Shanghai.

== Schedule ==
The schedule was as follows:

Date	Time	Round
Sunday 21 September 2025	11:03	Heats
Thursday, 25 September 2025	13:47	Final B
Thursday, 25 September 2025	14:58	Final A

All times are UTC+08:00

== Results ==
=== Heats ===
The two fastest boats in each heat and the two fastest times advanced to the semifinals. The remaining boats were sent to the Final B.

==== Heat 1 ====
Rank	Rower	Country	Time	Notes
1	Sarah McKay; Hannah Scott; Lola Anderson; Rebecca Wilde	Great Britain	6:14.18	FA
2	Emanuela Ioana Ciotau; Alexandra Ungureanu; Andrada-Maria Moroșanu; Ioana Madalina Cornea	Romania	6:15.36	FA
3	Caroline de Paiva; Cassidy Deane; Kristen Siermachesky; Alizée Brien	Canada	6:17.84	FA
4	Olivia Nacht; Nina Wettstein; Sofia Meakin; Olivia Roth	Switzerland	6:18.88	FB
5	Daryna Verkhohliad; Diana Serebrianska; Kateryna Dudchenko; Yevheniya Dovhodko	Ukraine	6:19.19	FB
6	Zhang Guoting; Zhao Xingyue; Yu Siyuan; Ren Wanning	China	6:34.43	FB

==== Heat 2 ====
Rank	Rower	Country	Time	Notes
1	Lisa Bruijnincx; Margot Leeuwenburgh; Willemijn Mulder; Tessa Dullemans	Netherlands	6:13.02	FA
2	Sarah Wibberenz; Frauke Hundeling; Lisa Gutfleisch; Pia Greiten	Germany	6:14.13	FA
3	Ella Cossill; Kathryn Glen; Stella Clayton-Greene; Veronica Wall	New Zealand	6:16.96	FA
4	Julia Rogiewicz; Anna Khlibenko; Zuzanna Lesner; Barbara Jęchorek	Poland	6:18.18	FB
5	Katherine Flynn; Sofia Calabrese; Alina Hagstrom; Sera Busse	United States	6:22.29	FB
6	Markéta Nedělová; Alžběta Zavadilová; Michala Pospíšilová; Terezie Janštová	Czech Republic	6:32.28	FB

=== Finals ===
The A final determined the rankings for places 1 to 6. Additional rankings were determined in the other finals.

==== Final B ====
Rank	Rower	Country	Time	Total rank
1	Julia Rogiewicz; Anna Khlibenko; Zuzanna Lesner; Barbara Jęchorek	Poland	6:39.71	7
2	Daryna Verkhohliad; Diana Serebrianska; Kateryna Dudchenko; Yevheniya Dovhodko	Ukraine	6:41.22	8
3	Olivia Nacht; Nina Wettstein; Sofia Meakin; Olivia Roth	Switzerland	6:44.10	9
4	Katherine Flynn; Sofia Calabrese; Alina Hagstrom; Sera Busse	United States	6:45.19	10
5	Markéta Nedělová; Alžběta Zavadilová; Michala Pospíšilová; Terezie Janštová	Czech Republic	6:59.44	11
6	Zhang Guoting; Zhao Xingyue; Yu Siyuan; Ren Wanning	China	7:04.62	12

==== Final A ====
Rank	Rower	Country	Time	Notes
1st place, gold medalist(s)	Lisa Bruijnincx; Margot Leeuwenburgh; Willemijn Mulder; Tessa Dullemans	Netherlands	6:32.92	
2nd place, silver medalist(s)	Sarah McKay; Hannah Scott; Lola Anderson; Rebecca Wilde	Great Britain	6:34.52	
3rd place, bronze medalist(s)	Sarah Wibberenz; Frauke Hundeling; Lisa Gutfleisch; Pia Greiten	Germany	6:36.00	
4	Emanuela Ioana Ciotau; Alexandra Ungureanu; Andrada-Maria Moroșanu; Ioana Madalina Cornea	Romania	6:37.38	
5	Ella Cossill; Kathryn Glen; Stella Clayton-Greene; Veronica Wall	New Zealand	6:47.90	
6	Caroline de Paiva; Cassidy Deane; Kristen Siermachesky; Alizée Brien	Canada	6:54.00	
