= Leeuwenburgh =

Leeuwenburgh is a surname. Notable people with the surname include:

- Margot Leeuwenburgh (born 1995), Dutch rower
- Peter Leeuwenburgh (born 1994), Dutch footballer
