= C. Cybele Raver =

American developmental psychologist

President of the University of Michigan
- Designate
- Assuming office December 1, 2026
- Succeeding: Domenico Grasso

Provost of Vanderbilt University
- In office July 1, 2021 – October 30, 2026
- Preceded by: Susan Rae Wente

Personal details
- Born: Cassandra Cybele Raver New York City, U.S.
- Spouse: Clancy Blair (died 2024)
- Relatives: Kim Raver (sister)
- Education: Radcliffe College (BA); Yale University (PhD)
- Scientific career
- Fields: Developmental psychology
- Workplaces: Cornell University; University of Chicago; New York University; Vanderbilt University; University of Michigan
- Thesis: Mother-child reciprocity and the development of social competence in two-year-olds (1994)
- Doctoral advisor: Bonnie Jean Leadbeater

Cassandra Cybele Raver is an American psychological researcher who has been appointed as the incoming 17th president of the University of Michigan, effective December 1, 2026. She served as provost of Vanderbilt University in Tennessee from July 2021 to October 2026 and as deputy provost at New York University from 2018 to 2021.

== Early life and education ==
Raver grew up in Manhattan and is the sister of actress Kim Raver. She graduated from Phillips Academy Andover in 1982.

Raver received a Bachelor of Arts degree from Radcliffe College (Note: Merged into Harvard University in 1999.) in 1986 and a Doctor of Philosophy degree in developmental psychology from Yale University in 1994. Her doctoral advisor was Bonnie Jean Leadbeater, and her doctoral dissertation was titled Mother-child reciprocity and the development of social competence in two-year-olds (1994).

== Career ==
Raver began her academic career at Cornell University, where she was an assistant professor at the Department of Human Development from 1994 to 2000. From 2000 to 2007, she was an associate professor at the Harris School of Public Policy of the University of Chicago, where she also directed the Harris School's Center for Human Potential and Public Policy from 2002.

Raver joined New York University in 2007, where she served as a faculty member in applied psychology at the NYU Steinhardt School of Culture, Education, and Human Development. She served as vice provost of academic, faculty, and research affairs from 2012 to 2017, as senior vice provost for academic analytics and graduate affairs from 2017 to 2018, and as deputy provost from 2018 to June 2021.

On July 1, 2021, Raver became provost and vice chancellor for academic affairs at Vanderbilt University in Nashville, Tennessee. On August 19, 2026, she announced that she would leave Vanderbilt University to become president of the University of Michigan, and Vanderbilt designated October 31 as her final day.

=== University of Michigan ===
On August 18, 2026, the University of Michigan Board of Regents selected Raver as president-designate of the university. On September 1, the board formally appointed Raver as the university's incoming 17th president, effective December 1. Her initial contract covers a five-year term as president, ending on December 1, 2031. At the start of her term at Michigan, Raver would have the highest annual base salary of any public university president, at US$2 million.

== Awards and honors ==
Raver received awards and honors including:

- 1999–2006 William T. Grant Scholar by William T. Grant Foundation
- 2012 American Psychological Association Award for Distinguished Contributions of Applications of Psychology to Education and Training
- 2019 elected member of the National Academy of Education
- 2021 elected fellow of the American Association for the Advancement of Science

== Personal life ==
Raver was married to developmental psychologist Clancy Blair, with whom she also collaborated academically. Blair died in December 2024.
