= M. Craig Barnes =

American theologian

The Reverend M. Craig Barnes
- Born: August 28, 1956 (age 70)
- Title: President of Princeton Theological Seminary

Ecclesiastical career
- Religion: Christianity (Presbyterian)
- Church: Presbyterian Church (USA)
- Ordained: 1981

Academic background
- Education: The King's College; Princeton Theological Seminary; University of Chicago
- Thesis: John R. Mott: A Conversionist in a Pluralist World (1992)
- Doctoral advisor: Martin Marty

M. Craig Barnes (born 1956) is an American Presbyterian minister and professor who served as president of Princeton Theological Seminary.

== Biography and career ==
Born on August 28, 1956, and raised on Long Island, Barnes attended The King's College in New York City, where he graduated with a Bachelor of Arts degree in history, in 1978. He went on to graduate from Princeton Theological Seminary, in 1981, with a Master of Divinity degree. Barnes then earned a Doctor of Philosophy degree in the history of Christianity from the University of Chicago Divinity School, in 1992, under the supervision of Martin Marty. For his doctoral studies, he wrote a dissertation titled John R. Mott: A Conversionist in a Pluralist World.

In 1981, Barnes was ordained as a minister in the PC(USA), serving in PC(USA) congregations in Colorado Springs, Colorado, and Madison, Wisconsin. In 1993, he became senior pastor of National Presbyterian Church in Washington, DC, serving until 2002, when he accepted a teaching position at Pittsburgh Theological Seminary, in Pittsburgh, Pennsylvania. One year later, while serving as Robert Meneilly Professor of Pastoral Ministry, Barnes accepted a call to Shadyside Presbyterian Church as senior pastor. On October 8, 2012, Princeton Theological Seminary announced that Barnes was selected to succeed the retiring Iain Torrance as president. Barnes took up his duties as president on January 1, 2013, and was formally installed as president on October 23, 2013. He serves as president until January 2023, when he retired and received the title President Emeritus. While at Princeton Seminary, he also served as professor of pastoral ministry.

On June 1, 2023, Barnes answered the call to serve as the Transitional Pastor and Head of Staff at the Chestnut Hill Presbyterian Church in Philadelphia, Pennsylvania.

Barnes is married and has a daughter and two sons.

== Works ==
=== Thesis ===
- Barnes, M. Craig (March 1992). John R. Mott: A Conversionist in a Pluralist World (PhD thesis). Chicago, IL: University of Chicago, The Divinity School. OCLC 40864303.

=== Books ===
- Barnes, M. Craig (1991). Yearning. Downers Grove, Illinois: InterVarsity Press. ISBN 978-0-830-81378-0. OCLC 24373609.
- ——— (1996). When God Interrupts: finding new life through unwanted change. Downers Grove, Illinois: InterVarsity Press. ISBN 978-0-830-81979-9. OCLC 33971878.
- ——— (1999). Hustling God: why we work so hard for what God wants to give. Grand Rapids, Michigan: Zondervan Publishing House. ISBN 978-0-310-21954-5. OCLC 40408768.
- ——— (2001). Sacred Thirst. Grand Rapids, Michigan: Zondervan Publishing House. ISBN 978-0-310-21955-2. OCLC 44972007.
- ——— (2011). McKim, Donald K. (ed.). Temptation in the Desert. Being Reformed: faith seeking understanding. Louisville, Kentucky: Congregational Ministries Publishing. OCLC 764432927.
- ——— (2003). An Extravagant Mercy. Ann Arbor, Michigan: Servant Publications, Vine Books. ISBN 978-1-569-55370-1. OCLC 51818668.
- ——— (2003). Searching for Home. Grand Rapids, Michigan: Brazos Press, A Division of Baker Book House Company. ISBN 978-1-587-43062-6. OCLC 52182494.
- ——— (2008). The Pastor as Minor Poet. Calvin Institute of Christian Worship Liturgical Studies Series. Grand Rapids, Michigan: Eerdmans Publishing Company. ISBN 978-0-802-82962-7. OCLC 244627974.
- ——— (2012). Body and Soul: Reclaiming the Heidelberg Catechism. Grand Rapids, Michigan; Louisville, Kentucky: Faith Alive Publishers; Congregational Ministries Publishing. ISBN 978-1-592-55745-5. OCLC 827784170.

=== Articles ===
- ——— (December 1995). "The Interruption of Christmas Plans". The Living Pulpit. IV (4).
- ——— (August 1996). "Losing the Life of Our Dreams: A Christian View of Suffering". Theology Matters. 2 (4).
- ——— (September 1999). "The Lamb and Wolf of Renewal". PFR ReNews Journal.
- ——— (1999). "Listening to Jesus". Reformed Liturgy & Music. 33 (4).
- ——— (Summer 2000). "Voice in the Wilderness". PFR ReForm Journal.
- ——— (2001). "Pastor's Viewpoint". Call to Worship. 35 (2).
- ——— (2001). "Pastor's Viewpoint". Call to Worship. 35 (3).
- ——— (2001). "Pastor's Viewpoint". Call to Worship. 35 (4).
- ——— (Winter 2001). "Our Christian Roots in Jerusalem". Living Stones Newsletter. 1 (1).
- ——— (April 1, 2002). "Easter in an Age of Terror". Christianity Today. 46 (4).
- ——— (January 2003). "Learning our Identity in a Sacred Encounter". Modern Reformation. 12 (1).

Academic offices
Preceded by Iain Torrance	President of Princeton Theological Seminary; 2013–present	Incumbent
