= Susan Rae Wente =

American cell biologist and academic administrator

Susan Wente

14th President of Wake Forest University
- In office July 1, 2021 – June 30, 2026
- Preceded by: Nathan O. Hatch
- Succeeded by: Peter Rodriguez

Provost of Vanderbilt University
- In office July 2014 – June 2021
- Preceded by: Richard C. McCarty
- Succeeded by: C. Cybele Raver

Personal details
- Born: 1962 (age 63–64)
- Education: University of Iowa (BS); University of California, Berkeley (PhD)

Susan Wente (born 1962) is an American cell biologist and academic administrator who served as the 14th president of Wake Forest University in North Carolina from July 2021 to June 2026. From 2014 to 2021 she was Provost and Vice Chancellor for Academic Affairs at Vanderbilt University. Between August 15, 2019 and June 30, 2020, she served as interim Chancellor at Vanderbilt.

== Education ==
Wente graduated from the University of Iowa with a B.S. in biochemistry with high honors in 1984. She then completed her graduate studies at the University of California, Berkeley, where she received a Ph.D. in biochemistry in 1988. Her dissertation was titled, "Site-Directed Mutations Altering the Active Site and the Nucleotide-Binding Site of Aspartate Transcarbamoylase."

== Career ==
During her time at the University of Iowa (1980 - 1984), Wente worked as a research technician under F. Jeffery Field in the Lipid Research Core Laboratory at the University of Iowa College of Medicine. She was a student research collaborator with Marshall Elzinga in the Department of Biology at the Brookhaven National Laboratory in Upton, New York. Wente also completed her undergraduate thesis studies under the direction of Alice B. Fulton in the Department of Biochemistry. She became a teaching assistant in the Department of Biochemistry while at the University of California, Berkeley. Wente taught a biochemistry laboratory course the summer after obtaining her Ph.D. Wente engaged in a molecular biology postdoctoral fellowship with Ora Rosen at the Memorial Sloan Kettering Cancer Center in New York City from 1988 - 1989. She then completed a postdoctoral fellowship with Günter Blobel at the Laboratory of Cell Biology at the Howard Hughes Medical Institute at Rockefeller University in New York City from 1989 - 1993. She received a Beckman Young Investigators Award in 1996.

Wente became an assistant professor of Cell Biology and Physiology at the Washington University School of Medicine in St. Louis, Missouri in 1993 and associate professor in 1998. She began working at Vanderbilt in 2002 as the department chair and professor of cell and developmental biology. In December 2008, she became an assistant vice chancellor for research at Vanderbilt. In 2009, she was promoted to associate vice chancellor for research and senior associate dean for biomedical sciences. She was named Vanderbilt's provost and vice chancellor for academic affairs in July 2014. Wente was announced as the 14th and first female President of Wake Forest University on January 29, 2021, and assumed office on July 1, 2021.

Wente serves on the editorial boards for the journals Advances in Biological Regulation, Current Opinion in Cell Biology and Nucleus. She previously served as an editor of Molecular and Cellular Biology (1999-2003) and associate editor of Molecular Biology of the Cell (2004-2009). She previously served on the editorial board of Traffic (2004-2014) and Molecular and Cellular Biology (1999-2013).

== Current research ==
Wente's current research focuses on the cell's adaptability to changing environmental conditions. She focuses on the exchange of large molecules between the nucleus and the cytoplasm. She focuses mostly on the border of this exchange, called the NPC. Wente's work targets three specific questions:

1. How the NPC is created from its composition and how this affects the way genes are expressed
2. How the movement through the NPCs is regulated
3. How other factors associated with NPCs play a role in other steps of gene expression

To view the cells and perform her studies, Wente uses yeast and fluorescent imaging. She studies these cells by examining interactions between the NPCs and its receptors for imported and exported material. She further studies the NPCs by observing its supporting proteins and determining the functions of these proteins. In doing so, she can test different hypotheses and figure out how these proteins could potentially malfunction and lead to various disease pathologies.

== Awards ==
Wente has been the recipient of numerous awards throughout her career. In 1984, she was awarded the Susan B. Hancher Award, recognizing her leadership as a senior at the University of Iowa and the Sanxay Prize, a token of promising graduate studies. In that same year, she was awarded the Hancher-Finkbine Medallion, the highest award bestowed by the University of Iowa for graduating seniors. Wente was also awarded Outstanding Graduate Student Instructor (1985-1986) by the University of California, Berkeley. From 1988 - 1990, she was awarded the New York State Health Research Council Postdoctoral Fellowship, and, from 1991 - 1993, the National Research Service Award Fellowship for Postdoctoral Study. In 2011, Wente received the Women in Cell Biology (WICB) Senior Leadership Award from the American Society for Cell Biology (ASCB). Wente was elected Fellow of the American Association for the Advancement of Science (AAAS) in 2011.

Other honors and awards include: National Institutes of Health, General Medical Sciences – MERIT Award 2010-2020 Nashville Medical News – ‘Women to Watch’ Class of 2014 NIH MERIT Award, 2010–present John H. Exton Award — For Research Leading to Innovative Biological Concepts, 2008 Steven and Michele Kirsch Foundation, Kirsch Investigator Award, 2001 - 2003 Beckman Foundation Young Investigator Award, 1996 - 1998 American Cancer Society Junior Faculty Research Award, 1996 - 1999 University of Iowa, Dewey B. Stuit Honors Award, 1982 Iowa Forensic League Hugh F. Seabury Award, 1980

== Selected publications ==
Below is a list of selected publications of Wente's in chronological order.

Wente discusses the export of mRNPs through NPCs and the different requirements for this to occur. The article discusses the different functional domains and receptors required for this transport to occur. It provides evidence that these factors directly affect FG domain function and mRNA export.

Soluble inositides are studied as possible second eukaryotic messengers. It is discovered that these inositides play a role in gene expression at various levels. The article suggests that the cell produces these inositides in localized areas in order to create quick signals within the body. The article also contains information regarding the way the cell responds to changing environments caused by extracellular stimuli which affect gene expression.

Wente and her colleagues discuss the overall function of the nuclear pore complex (NPC). They discuss that NPCs are the only known means of exchange for materials between the nucleus and cytoplasm. They discuss the different types of nucleus to cytoplasm transport. They conclude that proper NPC development is essential for physiological functioning, which if damaged, could cause improper cell division. The article focuses largely on the issues surrounding the topic of NPC assembly and functioning.

Wente and her colleagues provide the first evidence that the Ran GTPase cycle is essential in order to build the nuclear pore complex (NPC). They identified the different necessities to assemble NPCs using genetic information from Saccharomyces cerevisiae. They introduced mutant Ran factors and found that it caused nucleoporins and a poremembrane protein to be mislocalized. This caused disturbances in the membrane, so they were able to conclude that Ran mediation is required for proper NPC assembly.

This article was Wente's first publication as the sole author. She discusses how nuclear pore complexes (NPCs) are the location for the entrance and exit of the nucleus. She defines the transport machinery for movement within the cell and gives future direction that researchers may now examine the interactions between shuttling transport factors and the static pore complex.

This article also focuses on the protein transport in and out of the nucleus. In this article, Wente and her colleagues discuss the vast number of signal types, receptors, and proteins and how this suggests that there are many pathways for entrance to and exit from the nucleus. The mechanism of nucleocytoplasmic transport is also explained.

Wente and her colleagues investigated the enzyme aspartate transcarbamoylase and the amino acid residues that assist in making it a catalyst. They found that Lys-84 is essential in order for the enzyme to be catalyst and that replacement of any of this residue would cause the enzyme to essentially become inactive.
