= Jay P. Dolan =

American historian

Jay P. Dolan (March 17, 1936 – May 7, 2023) was an American historian and former Catholic priest who specialized in the history of Catholicism in the United States. He spent almost his entire career at the University of Notre Dame (1971–2003), where he founded and directed the Cushwa Center for the Study of American Catholicism.

== Education and family ==
Dolan was born in the Irish American community in Bridgeport, Connecticut, to Joseph T. and Margaret (Reardon) Dolan. He graduated from Fairfield College Preparatory School. He was ordained a priest in Rome in 1961 and earned his licentiate in sacred theology from the Pontifical Gregorian University in Rome in 1962. He then served in several parishes in the Diocese of Bridgeport. In 1966, he enrolled as a doctoral student at the University of Chicago Divinity School, where he studied under Martin E. Marty. Dolan's research emphasized the men and women who occupied the pews rather than the pulpits. He earned a Ph.D. in history in 1970. His dissertation was published as The Immigrant Church: New York Irish and German Catholics, 1815–1865 (Johns Hopkins University Press, 1975), and was awarded the John Gilmary Shea Prize by the American Catholic Historical Association in 1976. He left the priesthood and married Patricia McNeal in 1973. They had two children.

== Career ==
Dolan was a member of the history department at Notre Dame from 1971 to his retirement in 2003. He taught courses in American Catholic history, American religious history, immigration history, and Irish American history. He founded and directed the Cushwa Center for the Study of American Catholicism (1975–1993). Dolan was elected president of the American Society of Church History in 1987 and the American Catholic Historical Association in 1995. In 2007 he received the Catholic Library Association's Jerome Award for outstanding contributions to Catholic scholarship.

== Legacy and evaluations ==
Regarding Dolan's In Search of an American Catholicism: A History of Religion and Culture in Tension, Thomas W. Jodziewicz wrote in the Catholic Historical Review:

Throughout his survey, the author works five themes: democracy, devotional style, questions of nationality, the Americanization of Catholic doctrine, and gender. The primary narrative context is in fact the developing, indigenous democratic culture in the United States since the end of the American Revolution, and the entry of an apparently foreign Roman Catholicism into this largely Protestant republic, an entry that was not always so easy, nor so acceptable to the majority of an oftentimes apprehensive native population.

According to Martin E. Marty:

In any evaluation of the generation that furthered the study of American Catholic history toward the turn of the millennium, Dolan has been a leader recognized across the map of the profession and beyond it. His writing, his teaching, his service as president of the two main associations in our craft, and his pioneering work at the Cushwa Center poised him well for his central role.

== Works ==
- "Immigrants in the City: New York's Irish and German Catholics." Church History 41.3 (1972): 354–368.
- "A critical period in American Catholicism." Review of Politics 35.4 (1973): 523–536.
- The Immigrant Church: New York Irish and German Catholics, 1815–1865 (Johns Hopkins University Press, 1975), winner of the American Catholic Historical Association's John Gilmary Shea Prize in 1976.
- (Founder and Editor). American Catholic Studies Newsletter, 1975–2023.
- (Editor). The American Catholic Tradition (Arno, 1978), a collection of documents.
- Catholic Revivalism: The American Experience, 1830–1900 (University of Notre Dame Press, 1978).
- The American Catholic Experience: A History from Colonial Times to the Present (Doubleday, 1985) (2nd edition, University of Notre Dame Press, 1992).
- (Editor). The American Catholic Parish: A History from 1850 to the Present (2 vol., Paulist, 1987).
- "The Immigrants and Their Gods: A New Perspective in American Religious History." Church History 57.1 (1988): 61–72.
- (Editor). Transforming Parish Ministry: The Changing Roles of Catholic Clergy, Laity, and Women Religious (Crossroad, 1989).
- (Editor, with James P. Wind). New Dimensions in American Religious History: Essays in Honor of Martin E. Marty (W. B. Eerdmans, 1993).
- (Editor, with Gilberto M. Hinojosa). Mexican Americans and the Catholic Church, 1900–1965 (Volume 1, "Notre Dame History of Hispanic Catholics in the U.S." series), (University of Notre Dame Press, 1994).
- (Editor, with Jaime R. Vidal). Puerto Rican and Cuban Catholics in the U.S., 1900–1965 (Volume 2, "Notre Dame History of Hispanic Catholics in the U.S." series), (University of Notre Dame Press, 1994).
- (Editor, with Allan Figueroa). Hispanic Catholic Culture in the U.S.: Issues and Concerns (Volume 3, "Notre Dame History of Hispanic Catholics in the U.S." series), (University of Notre Dame Press, 1994).
- In Search of an American Catholicism: A History of Religion and Culture in Tension (Oxford University Press, 2002).
- The Irish Americans: A History (Bloomsbury, 2008).
