= Nathan O. Hatch =

American administrator and historian

Nathan Hatch

13th President of Wake Forest University
- In office October 20, 2005 – June 30, 2021
- Preceded by: Thomas K. Hearn Jr.
- Succeeded by: Susan Wente

Personal details
- Born: Nathan Orr Hatch Columbia, South Carolina, U.S.
- Education: Wheaton College (BA); Washington University in St. Louis (MA, PhD)
- Occupation: Academic administrator; author
- Website: president.wfu.edu/bio/

Nathan Orr Hatch is a scholar of American religious history and academic administrator. He most recently served as the President of Wake Forest University in Winston-Salem, North Carolina, having been officially installed on October 20, 2005. Before coming to Wake Forest, Hatch was a professor and later dean and provost at the University of Notre Dame. Prior to his career in academic administration, he was a historian who was a leading scholar on issues related to the history of religion in the United States.

== Early life and education ==
Born and raised in Columbia, South Carolina, Hatch graduated summa cum laude from Wheaton College (1968) in Illinois and earned his master's and doctoral degrees from Washington University in St. Louis. He has held postdoctoral fellowships at Harvard and Johns Hopkins universities and has been awarded research grants by the NEH, the American Council of Learned Societies, and the American Antiquarian Society.

== Career ==
Hatch taught at the University of Notre Dame beginning in 1976. He served as associate dean of the College of Arts and Letters, its largest college, from 1983 to 1988, and from 1988 to 1989 was the college's acting dean. During that time he founded and directed the Institute of Scholarship in the Liberal Arts (ISLA), which fostered a sixfold increase in external funding of faculty in the humanities and social sciences and assisted Notre Dame faculty members in winning 21 National Endowment for the Humanities fellowships from 1985 to 1991. In 1999 Hatch was appointed the Andrew V. Tackes Professor of History at Notre Dame.

In 1989 Hatch was appointed Notre Dame's vice president for graduate studies and research. In 1996, he became the university's provost, the third person to hold the position since its establishment in 1970. As provost he was Notre Dame's second-ranking academic officer and, under the direction of the president, exercised overall responsibility for the academic enterprise. He held this office until 2005, at which time he became president of Wake Forest University. He retired from Wake Forest in 2021.

== Legacy ==
Hatch is regularly cited as one of the most influential scholars in the study of the history of religion in America. His book The Democratization of American Christianity, published by Yale University Press in 1989, garnered three awards, including the 1989 Albert Outler Prize in Ecumenical Church History and the 1990 John Hope Franklin Prize as the best book in American studies. Professor Gordon Wood of Brown University called it "the best book on religion in the early Republic that has ever been written"; it was also chosen in a survey of 2,000 historians and sociologists as one of the two most important books in the study of American religion.

Earlier Hatch had published The Sacred Cause of Liberty: Republican Thought and the Millennium in Revolutionary New England, also with Yale University Press, and with historians George Marsden and Mark Noll co-authored the 1983 volume The Search for Christian America (Crossway Books). He has co-edited two books with (Oxford University Press), The Bible in America (with Mark Noll, 1981) and Jonathan Edwards and the American Experience (with Harry Stout, 1989). In 2001 he co-edited Methodism and the Shaping of American Culture (Abingdon Press) with John Wigger. He has also edited a volume with the University of Notre Dame Press, The Professions in American History [1988]. In 1982, along with Mark Noll, he co-founded the Institute for the Study of American Evangelicals (ISAE) at his undergraduate alma mater, Wheaton College. In 1990, Hatch secured funding from the Pew Charitable Trusts to establish the Evangelical Scholarship Initiative at Notre Dame which provided grants for senior evangelical scholars, sabbatical funding, and scholarships for evangelical graduate students across a wide swath of disciplines. In 1993 he served as president of the American Society of Church History.

== Personal life ==
Hatch is married and has three children. At Wake Forest, students often referred to him as "Natty O." Hatch's middle name is "Orr."

== Publications ==
- The Sacred Cause of liberty: Republican thought and the Millennium in Revolutionary New England (1977)
- The Gospel in America: Themes in the Story of America's evangelical (1979)
- The Bible in America: Essays in Cultural History (1982)
- The Democratization of American Christianity (1988)
- The Professions in American History (1988)
- Jonathan Edwards and the American Experience (1988)
- The Search for Christian America (1989)
- Methodism and the Shaping of American Culture (2001)
- The Gift of Transformative leaders (2024)
