= Ralph Keen =

American historian

- Born: 1957 (age 68–69)

Academic background
- Education: Columbia University; Yale University; University of Chicago

Academic work
- Discipline: History; religious studies
- Sub-discipline: Early-modern European history; ecclesiastical history
- Institutions: Alaska Pacific University; University of Iowa; University of Illinois at Chicago
- Main interests: Early-modern Roman Catholicism; Protestant Reformation

Ralph Keen (born 1957) is an American historian of religion and an academic administrator at the University of Illinois at Chicago. Trained in classics as an undergraduate with graduate work in the history of Christianity, Keen has since 2010 been professor of history at the University of Illinois at Chicago, and since 2015 he has been dean of the Honors College.

His research in Reformation-era religious thought includes Divine and Human Authority in Reformation Thought (1997), Luther’s Lives (2003), The Christian Tradition (2008), Exile and Restoration in Jewish Thought (2011), as well as editions of works by Thomas More and Johannes Cochlaeus. Keen is also a co-editor of the monograph series Catholic Christendom, 1300–1700 published by Brill.

In 2018, he was president of the American Society of Church History.

Keen received a bachelor's degree in Greek from Columbia University, master's degree in classics from Yale University, and a Ph.D. in the history of Christianity from the University of Chicago.

Professional and academic associations
Preceded by Candy Gunther Brown	President of the American; Society of Church History; 2018–2019	Succeeded by Paul C. H. Lim
