= John G. Stackhouse Jr. =

Canadian scholar of religion (born 1960)

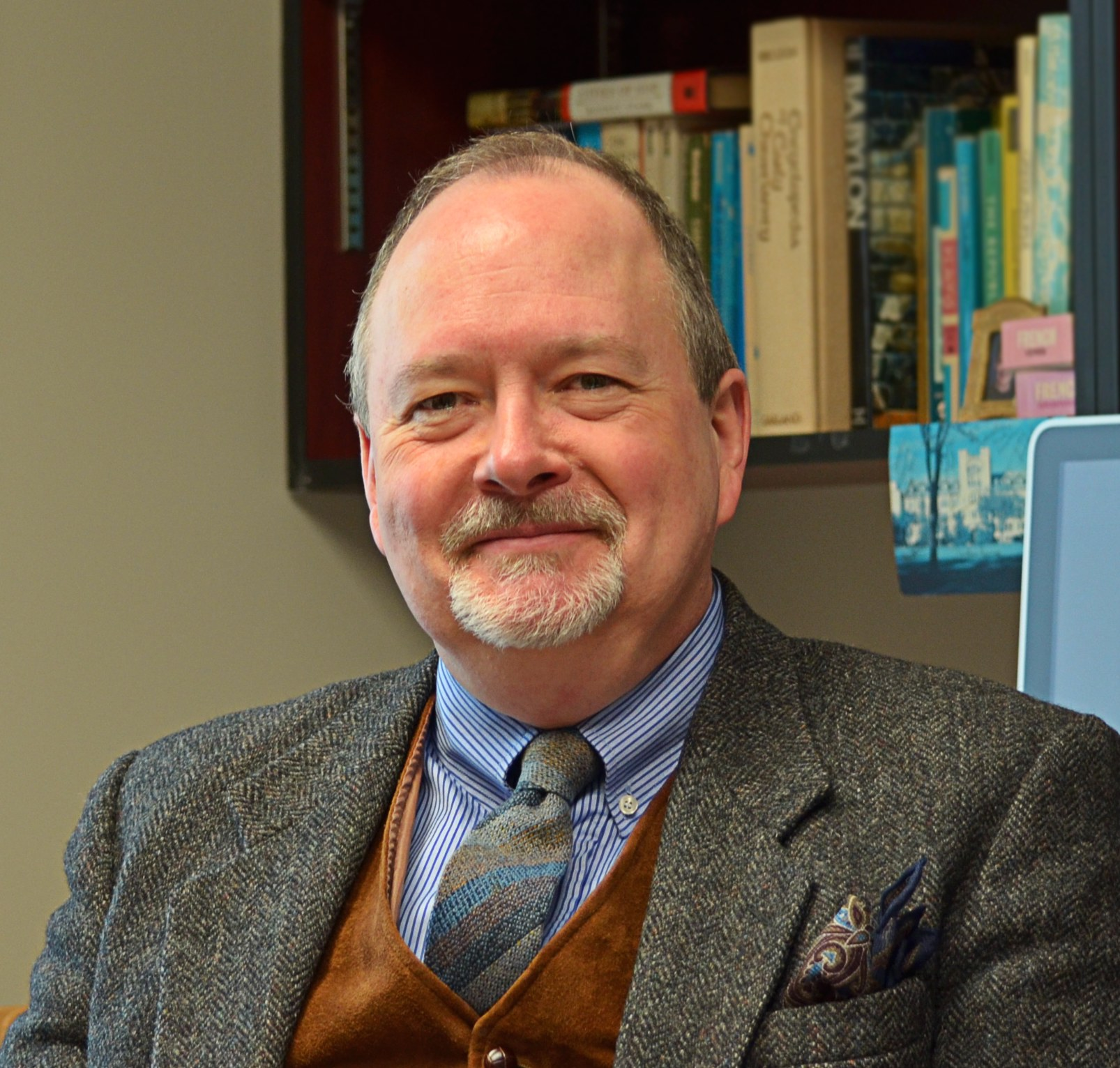
- Born: John Gordon Stackhouse Jr. 1960 (age 65–66); Kingston, Ontario, Canada

Academic background
- Education: Queen's University (BA); Wheaton College (MA); University of Chicago (PhD)
- Thesis: Proclaiming the Word: Canadian Evangelicalism since World War I (1987)
- Doctoral advisor: Martin E. Marty
- Other advisor: Mark A. Noll

Academic work
- Discipline: Religious studies
- Institutions: Northwestern College; University of Manitoba; Regent College; Crandall University
- Website: johnstackhouse.com

John Gordon Stackhouse Jr. (born 1960) is a Canadian scholar of religion.

== Early life and education ==
Stackhouse was born in 1960 in Kingston, Ontario, Canada, and raised in southwestern England and northern Ontario, the eldest of four children. His father, John G. Stackhouse, was a general surgeon. His mother, A. Yvonne (Annan) Stackhouse, was a schoolteacher and later university instructor.

Stackhouse received his higher education in Canada and the United States. After a year at Mount Carmel Bible School in Edmonton, he graduated from Queen's University at Kingston with a B.A. in history with first class honours in 1980. He then earned M.A. with highest honors in church history and theology from Wheaton College in 1982 and his Ph.D. from the University of Chicago in 1987 under Martin E. Marty. His doctoral dissertation was titled, "Proclaiming the Word: Canadian Evangelicalism since World War I".

== Career ==
Stackhouse began teaching at the International Teams School of World Missions and then Wheaton College, both in suburban Chicago, during his doctoral studies. His first full-time position was as an assistant professor of European history at Northwestern College in Orange City, Iowa (1987–90). From there, he went to teach Modern Christianity (history, sociology, philosophy, and theology) in the Department of Religion at the University of Manitoba, in Winnipeg, Manitoba, Canada, rising to the rank of professor in 1997. One year later, he left for Regent College in Vancouver (1998–2015), where he served as the Sangwoo Youtong Chee Professor of Theology and Culture at Regent College, in the position formerly held by J. I. Packer.

In 2015, Stackhouse headed east to become the inaugural Samuel J. Mikolaski Professor of Religious Studies at Crandall University and that university's first Dean of Faculty Development. In 2018 he received that university's Stephen and Ella Steeves Award for Excellence in Research.

=== Termination for alleged sexual harassment ===
In November 2023, Crandall University announced that it was terminating Stackhouse's employment following a six month independent investigation into allegations that he sexually harassed students. He had faced a similar investigation at Regent College, the year before his departure from that institution. Why he left Regent is shielded by a non-disclosure agreement.

On 8 December 2023, Stackhouse sued Crandall University claiming he was wrongly terminated and that the firing damaged him. In reply, Crandall denies any and all liability to Stackhouse and requests the court dismiss his claim with costs. In an attempt to clear his name, Stackhouse sued CBC for defamation in the amount of $10.35 million in 2023. Ontario's Superior Court dismissed this defamation suit in lieu of little evidence from the plaintiff. Instead, the defendant, The CBC, reported 'meticulously' and without malice to uncover the truth of these allegations and their findings were deemed founded. Following the suit's dismissal in May 2024, Stackhouse was ordered to pay the CBC $115,000.

=== Writing ===
Stackhouse appeared on the editorial masthead of Christianity Today from 1994 until 2018, and served as a contributing editor for Books & Culture and Christian History & Biography magazines. He is a former columnist with Christian Week and the Winnipeg Free Press, and resumed his column with Faith Today in 2009. He served as senior advisor to the Centre for Research on Canadian Evangelicalism from its genesis in 2008 to 2010. He wrote over 200 weekly web columns for "Context: Beyond the Headlines," a Canadian Christian public affairs television program, until 2020. He writes occasionally for the Religion News Service, "Sightings" (produced at the University of Chicago Divinity School). He also serves on the editorial board of the Anglican Journal in Canada and as a Fellow of the Centre for Public Christianity in Australia.

Stackhouse's writing has covered the topics of theology, ethics, the history of Christianity, and both the sociology and philosophy of religion. He has edited four books of academic theology, authored eleven books, and co-authored four more.

== Personal life ==
Stackhouse married in 1980 and had three children. Stackhouse later divorced and remarried.

== Authored books ==
- John G. Stackhouse Jr. (1993). Canadian Evangelicalism in the Twentieth Century: An Introduction to Its Character. Toronto: University of Toronto Press. ISBN 0-8020-0509-8.
- John G. Stackhouse Jr. (1998). Can God Be Trusted: Faith and the Challenge of Evil. New York: Oxford University Press. ISBN 978-0-19-511727-1. OCLC 38079197.
- John G. Stackhouse Jr. (2002). Humble Apologetics: Defending the Faith Today. New York: Oxford University Press. ISBN 978-0-19-513807-8. OCLC 50905126.
- John G. Stackhouse Jr. (2002). Evangelical Landscapes: Facing Critical Issues of the Day. Grand Rapids, Mich.: Baker Academic. ISBN 978-0-8010-2594-5.
- John G. Stackhouse Jr. (2003). Church: An Insider's Look at How We Do It. Grand Rapids, Mich.: Baker Books. ISBN 978-0-8010-6407-4. OCLC 49805723.
- John G. Stackhouse Jr (2005). Finally Feminist: A Pragmatic Christian Understanding of Gender. Grand Rapids, Mich.: Baker Academic. ISBN 978-0-8010-3130-4. OCLC 60500033.
- John G. Stackhouse Jr. (2008). Making the Best of It: Following Christ in the Real World. New York: Oxford University Press. ISBN 978-0-19-517358-1. OCLC 167503462.
- John G. Stackhouse Jr. (2014). Need to Know: Vocation as the Heart of Christian Epistemology. New York: Oxford University Press. ISBN 978-0-19-979064-7.
- John G. Stackhouse Jr. (2015). Partners in Christ: A Conservative Case for Egalitarianism. Downers Grove, IL: InterVarsity Press. ISBN 978-0-8308-4081-6.
- John G. Stackhouse Jr. (2018). Why You're Here: Ethics for the Real World. New York: Oxford University Press. ISBN 978-0-19-063674-6.
- John G. Stackhouse Jr. (2020). Can I Believe? Christianity for the Hesitant. New York: Oxford University Press. ISBN 9780190922856.
- John G. Stackhouse Jr. (2022). Evangelicalism: A Very Short Introduction. New York: Oxford University Press. ISBN 9780190079680.
