= Quirinus Breen =

American historian and scholar of religion (1896–1975)

Quirinus Breen (3 March 1896 – 25 March 1975) was an American historian and scholar of religion.

Breen was born in Orange City, Iowa. He studied at Calvin College and Calvin Theological Seminary and was ordained as a minister in the Christian Reformed Church in 1920. R. B. Kuiper called him "one of the church's most promising young ministers". Breen left the denomination, however, after Ralph Janssen was deposed as a minister in 1922, being unhappy with the way his case had been handled. Breen then obtained a PhD in church history from the University of Chicago and taught at Hillsdale College and Albany College. In 1938 Breen began teaching at the University of Oregon, where he taught until his retirement in 1964, after which he taught at Grand Valley State College.

Breen specialized in the protestant reformers and early renaissance humanists. In 1968, a collection of his essays was published in his honor under the title Christianity and Humanism: Studies in the History of Ideas.

Breen served as President of the American Society of Church History in 1956.
