= Peter Rodriguez (economist) =

American economist

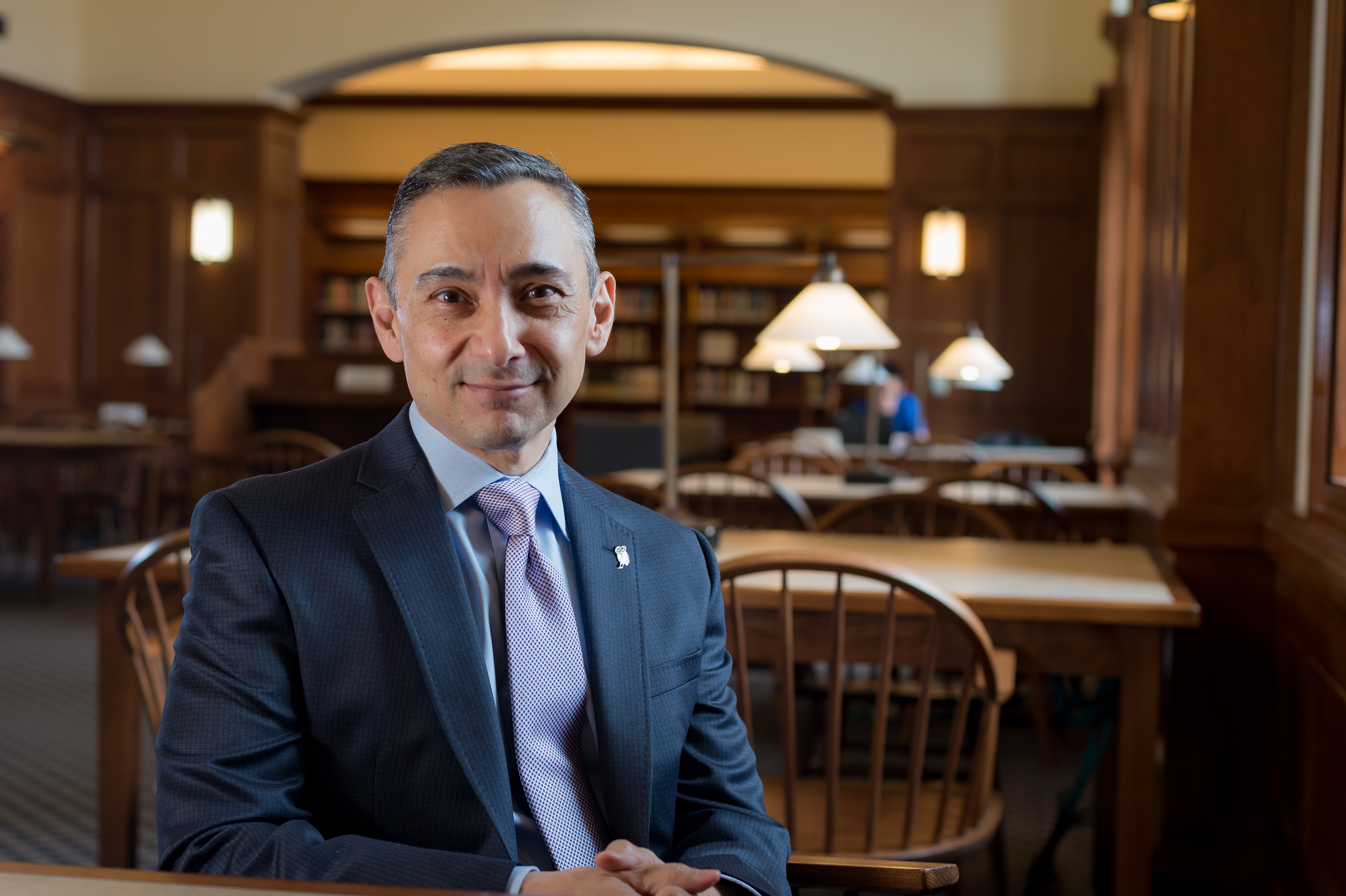

15th President of Wake Forest University
- Incumbent
- Assumed office July 1, 2026
- Preceded by: Susan Rae Wente

Personal details
- Born: February 13, 1968 (age 58)
- Education: Texas A&M University (B.S.); Princeton University (Ph.D., M.S.)
- Occupation: Professor; academic administrator
- Awards: Poets&Quants 2025 Dean of the Year

Peter Rodriguez (born February 13, 1968) is an American economist, professor, and academic administrator who has been the 15th president of Wake Forest University since July 2026. Rodriguez formerly served as the dean at Rice University's Jesse H. Jones Graduate School of Business since 2016 and their Virani Undergraduate School of Business since 2024. He was Rice University's first Hispanic dean.

== Early life and career ==
Rodriguez was raised in Kilgore, Texas. His father was a chemistry professor.

In 1990, he received a Bachelor of Science in economics from Texas A&M. He earned a master's in economics in 1992 and a Ph.D. in economics in 1998, both from Princeton University. While at Princeton, he studied under Ben Bernanke, former chairman of the Federal Reserve.

Early in his career, Rodriguez worked as an associate in the Global Energy Group at JP Morgan Chase in Houston.

From 1997 to 2003, he was a professor at Texas A&M University specializing in corruption, globalization, economic development, and social institutions. While there, he was recognized for excellence in teaching and research.

In 2003, he joined the University of Virginia Darden School of Business as a tenured professor. In 2014, he gave the "Last Lecture" at UVA – a tradition that invites distinguished faculty members to deliver a lecture as if it is their final opportunity to do so.

While at Darden, Rodriguez served as senior associate dean for degree programs and chief diversity officer. In 2009, Diversity MBA Magazine included him in their Top 100 Under 50 Executive & Emerging Leaders.

Rodriguez has been featured on Bloomberg Markets as an expert on U.S.-China trade and diversity on Wall Street.

He is a board member of Good Reason Houston and Texas 2036. In January 2025, he was appointed to the Houston Branch Board of Directors for the Federal Reserve Bank of Dallas.

In 2017, the Texas Diversity Council recognized Rodriguez for his multicultural leadership. In 2025, Poets&Quants named him Dean of the Year.

=== Rice University ===
In 2016, Rodriguez became the dean at Rice University's Jesse H. Jones Graduate School of Business.

Since joining Rice, Rodriguez launched an online journal that summarizes the school's research for everyday readers. He has introduced several new degree programs, including the first online graduate degree at Rice, the Hybrid MBA program, and the Virani Undergraduate School of Business.

Under Rodriguez's leadership, Rice has gained national prominence for its emphasis in finance and entrepreneurship. In 2025, The Princeton Review ranked Rice the No. 3 best MBA for finance, and for six consecutive years (2020–2025), The Princeton Review and Entrepreneur magazine ranked Rice the No. 1 graduate program in entrepreneurship.

=== Wake Forest University ===
In July 2026, Rodriguez became the President at Wake Forest University.

== Notable awards and honors ==
- 2025 Dean of the Year, Poets&Quants
- 2017 Multicultural Leadership Award, Texas Diversity Council
- 2009 Top 100 Under 50, Diversity MBA Magazine
- 2009 University Teaching Award, University of Virginia
- 2007, 2008 Mead/Colley Award for Engagement with Students, University of Virginia
- 2004, 2005 Excellence in Diversity Fellow, University of Virginia
- 2002 Faculty Distinguished Teaching Achievement Award, Association of Former Students at Texas A&M University
- 1999 Elected Fellow, The British-American Project at Johns Hopkins School of Advanced International Studies
- 1996 University-wide Teaching Excellence Award, Princeton University

== Personal life ==
Rodriguez is married to Kathleen Rodriguez and has three children: Gabriella, Samuel, and Michael.
