= Paul C. H. Lim =

American historian (born 1967)

- 임창하
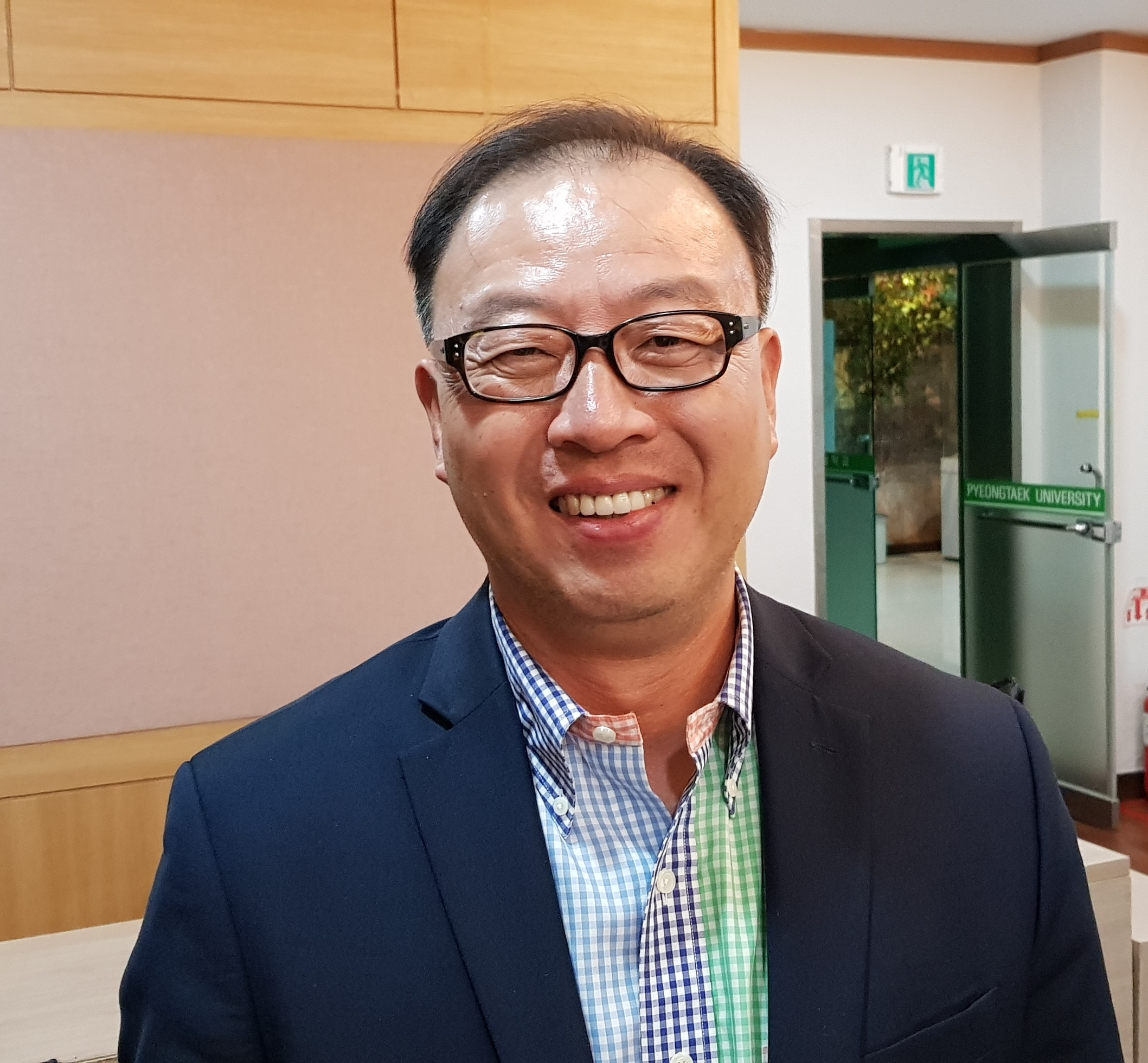
- Lim in 2018
- Born: Paul Chang-Ha Lim; April 29, 1967 (age 59); South Korea

Academic background
- Education: Yale University; Biblical Theological Seminary; Princeton Theological Seminary; University of Cambridge
- Doctoral advisor: Eamon Duffy
- Other advisor: Jane Dempsey Douglass

Academic work
- Discipline: History; theology
- Sub-discipline: Ecclesiastical history; historical theology; intellectual history
- Institutions: Gordon–Conwell Theological Seminary; Vanderbilt University
- Main interests: Puritanism; Reformation

Paul Chang-Ha Lim (Korean: 임창하; born April 29, 1967) an American ecclesiastical historian who serves as Professor of the Humanities at The Hamilton Center for Classical and Civic Education at the University of Florida. His main research involves the intellectual history and historical theology of Reformation and post-Reformation England.

== Life and education ==
Born on April 29, 1967, in South Korea, Lim received a Bachelor of Arts degree in economics at Yale University in 1990, followed by a Master of Divinity degree at Biblical Theological Seminary in 1995. He earned a Master of Theology degree at Princeton Theological Seminary in 1997 and a Doctor of Philosophy degree in the field of history of Christianity at the University of Cambridge in 2001.

Lim taught a historical and systematic theology at Gordon-Conwell Theological Seminary for five years. He is now teaching the intellectual history and historical theology of the Reformation and post-Reformation England. He is writing a book dealing with books relating with Reformation theology and social justice.

== Reformation history ==
Lim is known for his work on Richard Baxter, the celebrated seventeenth-century English Puritan. From 2001 until 2006 he taught at Gordon–Conwell Theological Seminary in South Hamilton, Massachusetts. For his book, Mystery Unveiled: The Crisis of the Trinity in Early Modern England (Oxford, 2012), Lim was awarded the 2013 Roland H. Bainton Prize. as the best book in history/theology published in 2012.

Jonathan Sheehan at UC Berkeley writes, "Paul Lim's erudite book demonstrates just how challenging it was when, during the English seventeenth century, Christianity's central mystery of the Trinity moved to the center of political, cultural, and religious controversies. With enormous theological and scriptural learning, Lim lets us see these controversies from the inside."

Lim has also received a Luce Fellowship in Theology, a Louisville Institute Research Grant, and a Vanderbilt Research Scholars Grant for his scholarship.

== Selected works ==
=== Authored books ===
- Mystery Unveiled: The Crisis of the Trinity in Early Modern England (Oxford University Press, August 2012)
- In Pursuit of Purity, Unity and Liberty: Richard Baxter's Puritan Ecclesiology in Its Seventeenth-century Context (Brill, 2004)

=== Edited books ===
- The Cambridge Companion to Puritanism (Cambridge, 2008)

=== Papers ===
- “Not Solely Sola Scriptura, or, a Rejoinder to Brad S. Gregory’s The Unintended Reformation,” in Journal of Medieval and Early Modern Studies 46:3 (September, 2016): 555- 82.
- “‘But to know it as we shoul’d do’: Enthusiasm, Historicizing of the Charismata, and Cessationism in Enlightenment England,” in The Spirit, the Affections, and the Christian Tradition, eds., Amos Yong and Dale Coulter. Notre Dame, IN: University of Notre Dame Press, 2016, pp. 231-57.
- “The Platonic Captivity of Primitive Christianity and the Enlightening of Augustine,” in God in the Enlightenment, eds. William J. Bulman and Robert G. Ingram. New York: Oxford University Press, 2016, pp. 136–56.
- “Reformed Theology in North America,” in The Oxford Handbook of Reformed Theology, eds. Michael Allen and Scott McSwain. Oxford: Oxford University Press, 2016
- forthcoming. “Herbert, Edward (Lord of Cherbury),” and “King James I and VI,” in Encyclopedia of the Bible and Its Reception (Berlin: Water de Gruyter, 2009–16). Vol. 11, pp. 830–31, and Vol. 16, pp. tbd.
- “Corinth, Calvin and Calcutta: Trinity, Trafficking and Transformation of Theologia,” in Ex Auditu: An International Journal of Theological Interpretation of Scripture, ed., Klyne Snodgrass vol. 30 (2014): 117–31.
- “Introduction,” and “Puritans and the Church of England: Historiography and Ecclesiology,” in Cambridge Companion to Puritanism, eds. John Coffey and Paul Lim. Cambridge: Cambridge University Press, 2008, pp. 1–18, 223–40.
- “Hypothetical Universalism and Real Calvinism in Seventeenth-century England,” Reformation 13 (2009): 193–204.
- “Adiaphora, Ecclesiology and Reformation: John Owen’s Theology of Religious Toleration in Context,” in Persecution and Pluralism: Calvinists and Religious Minorities in Early Modern Europe 1550–1700, eds. Richard Bonney and D.J.B. Trim. Bern: Peter Lang, 2006, pp. 243– 72.
- “The Reformed Pastor of Richard Baxter,” in Devoted Life: An Invitation to Puritan Classics, ed. Randall Gleason and Kelly Kapic. Downers Grove, IL: InterVarsity Press, 2004, pp. 224– 43.
- “Henry Bartlett,” “Samuel Wells,” “Benjamin Woodbridge,” “John Woodbrige,” in the Oxford Dictionary of National Biography, ed. Brian Harrison. Oxford: Oxford University Press, 2004,
- “Richard Baxter,” in The Dictionary of Historical Theology, ed. Trevor Hart. Grand Rapids, MI: Eerdmans, 2000,

Professional and academic associations
Preceded by Ralph Keen	President of the American; Society of Church History; 2019	Succeeded by Daniel Ramírez
