= H. Shelton Smith =

American professor

Hilrie Shelton Smith (1893–1987) was a scholar of Christianity and professor at Duke Divinity School in Durham, North Carolina.

== Education and career ==
H. Shelton Smith received his B.A. from Elon College (now Elon University), was ordained as a minister in the Congregational Churches, and served in 1918–1919 as first lieutenant and chaplain with the American Expeditionary Force in France. He received his graduate training at Yale University and went on to serve as Associate Professor of Religious Education at Teachers College, Columbia University and Associate Professor of Religious Education at Yale University. Three years later, he was named Professor of Religious Education at Duke Divinity School, where he served from 1931 to 1963. In 1953 he was named James B. Duke Professor at Duke Divinity School. Smith was known as a critic of liberal Christian trends that engaged in "a little deification of humanity." He was also known for his advocacy for civil rights for African-Americans.

Smith was the founder of the North Carolina Council of Churches. Upon returning to the South in 1931, he initiated conversations with other religious leaders about his vision of an "interdenominational agency to deal with problems of social justice, racial relations . . . or problems that confront the churches." In 1935 he convened about 40 religious leaders from 13 denominations for what became the founding meeting of the North Carolina Council of Churches. He served as its first president and unpaid executive secretary. But his main ongoing contribution was through supportive relationships with the Council's leaders. In 1953, he was one of the three initial recipients, along with Bishop Penick and Moravian Bishop J. Kenneth Pfohl, of the Council's Distinguished Service Award.

== Publications ==
=== His published books include ===
- Smith, H. Shelton. (1941). Faith and Nurture. New York: Charles Scribner's Sons.
- Smith, H. Shelton. (1955). Changing conceptions of original sin: A study in American theology since 1750. New York: Charles Scribner's Sons.
- Smith, H. Shelton, Handy, Robert L., & Loetscher, Lefferts A. (Eds.). (1960–63). American Christianity (Vols. 1-6). New York: Charles Charles Scribner's Sons.
- Smith, H. Shelton. (1965). Horace Bushnell. New York: Oxford University Press.
- Smith, H. Shelton. (1972). In His image, but...racism in southern religion, 1780–1910. Durham, N.C.: Duke University Press.

=== Books and articles about H. Shelton Smith include ===
- Cully, Kendig Brubaker. (1959). Two decades of thinking concerning Christian nurture. Religious Education, 54, 481-489.
- Henry, Stuart C. (1963). A miscellany of American Christianity: Essays in honor of H. Shelton Smith. Durham, N.C.: Duke University Press.
- Kinoshita, Carol Krichi. (1965). Two theologies of evangelism and nurture: A study of the function of the church in the thought of Horace Bushnell and H. Shelton Smith. Unpublished master's thesis, Golden Gate Baptist Theological School.
- Steward, David S. (1968). Patterns of conversion: An interpretation of the recent work of Christian education theorists. Religious Education, 63, 259-269.
- Miller, Randolph Crump. (1982). Religious education and theology. Birmingham, Ala.: Religious Education Press.
- Thistlethwaite, Susan Brooks. (1982). H. Shelton Smith: Critic of the theological perspective of progressive religious education, 1934–1950. Unpublished doctoral dissertation, Duke Divinity School.
- Zikmund, Barbara Brown. (1990). H. Shelton Smith: Contagious Christian. Christian Century, 107F7-14, 151-152.
