= E. Brooks Holifield =

American religious historian

- Born: January 5, 1942 (age 84); Little Rock, Arkansas, U.S.
- Education: Hendrix College, Yale University
- Awards: Named as an Outstanding Theological Educator by the Association of Theological Schools in 2009, named a fellow of the American Academy of Arts & Sciences in 2011
- Scientific career
- Fields: Religious history
- Workplaces: Candler School of Theology at Emory University
- Thesis: The covenant sealed: the development of Puritan sacramental theology in old and New England, 1570-1720 (1970)

E. Brooks Holifield (born January 5, 1942) is an American religious historian and the Charles Howard Candler Professor Emeritus of American Church History at Emory University's Candler School of Theology, where he taught until his retirement in 2011. He has been called "a giant among historians of religion."

A graduate of Hendrix College (B. A., 1963), Yale Divinity School (B.D. 1966), and the Yale Graduate School (M.A., 1968, Ph.D. 1970), he is the author of seven books on American religious history, including The Covenant Sealed: The Development of Puritan Sacramental Theology in Old and New England, 1570-1720 (1974), Gentlemen Theologians: American Theology and Southern Culture (1978), A History of Pastoral Care in America: From Salvation to Self-Realization (1983), Health and Medicine in the Methodist Tradition (1986), Era of Persuasion: American Thought and Culture 1521-1680 (1989), Theology in America: Christian Thought from the Age of the Puritans to the Civil War (2003), which won the Albert C. Outler prize of the American Society of Church History, and God’s Ambassadors: A History of the Christian Clergy in America (2007), which won the 2007 Best Book Award from the Association for Parish Clergy. He also wrote more than 175 articles, encyclopedia entries, and book reviews. He received research fellowships from the National Endowment for the Humanities (1976–77, 1983–84, 1991–92), the Louisville Institute (1998–99), the Pew Endowment (1998–99), and the Luce Fellowship Program of the Association of Theological Schools (2005–06), and he did research at Eberhard-Karls University in Tübingen, Germany in 1976-77 and at Oxford University in 1983–84. He has given lectures throughout the United States as well as in Frankfurt, Göttingen, and Tübingen, Germany. A former president of the American Society for Church History, he was also elected in 2011 as a Fellow of the American Academy of Arts and Sciences. In 2010 he was given the Emory University Teaching Award. He and his wife Vicky Holifield live in Decatur, Georgia. He retired from Emory in 2011, after forty one years of teaching in the Candler School of Theology, the Graduate Division of Religion, and the graduate program in history.
