= Mars Hill Audio =

Christian publisher of audio materials, including a bimonthly journal

- Company type: Private
- Industry: Publishing
- Founded: 1993
- Founder: Ken Myers
- Headquarters: Charlottesville, Virginia, United States
- Products: Audio materials, including Mars Hill Audio Journal
- Website: marshillaudio.org

Mars Hill Audio is a Christian publisher based in Charlottesville, Virginia, United States, primarily of audio materials, most notably a bimonthly "audio magazine," the Mars Hill Audio Journal. According to the company's website, the purpose of the company is "to assist Christians who desire to move from thoughtless consumption of modern culture to a vantage point of thoughtful engagement."

Most of the published materials focus on critiques of postmodernity and modern liberal values, and how an orthodox Christian worldview applies to a wide range of modern issues such as bioethics, city planning, the media, and academics. However, the viewpoints expressed in the Journal and other materials are not necessarily politically conservative, although the leaning is often in this direction; more accurately, the focus is critical rethinking of many of the assumptions of modernity and modern ethical theory.

== Publications ==
The Mars Hill Audio Journal, produced regularly since 1993, is a bimonthly, 90-minute "audio magazine" available on cassette tape, CD, and MP3 and is sold by subscription. Hosted by Ken Myers (formerly with National Public Radio and a graduate of Westminster Theological Seminary), the Journal consists of conversations between Myers and guests, most of whom are authors of recently published books. While a majority of the guests make a Christian profession, guests are selected for the merits of their arguments and the relevance of their viewpoints to the organization's purpose. Myers also provides commentary and analysis to segue from one conversation to the next.

Although the restrictions of the medium limit the length of these conversations to 12 to 15 minutes on the Journal (with 6 to 8 interviews on each issue), many are available as full-length Mars Hill Audio Conversations which are sold separately. Common topics include bioethics, city planning and communities, education, natural law theory, relativism, technology, literature, film, and music.

In addition to the Journal, Mars Hill Audio also produces anthologies of previously published essays and articles, documentary-type Reports, audiobooks, and a limited amount of printed material.
