= The Scandal of the Evangelical Mind =

1994 book by Mark Noll

- Author: Mark A. Noll
- Language: English
- Subject: Religion
- Publisher: Wm. B. Eerdmans
- Publication date: October 1, 1994
- Publication place: United States
- Media type: Hardcover, Trade Paperback
- ISBN: 0-8028-4180-5
- OCLC: 34271408

The Scandal of the Evangelical Mind is a 1994 book by evangelical Christian scholar Mark A. Noll, who is currently Francis A. McAnaney Professor of History at the University of Notre Dame. As a critique of the waning influence of intellectual pursuits within the American evangelical community, the book is both a scholarly analysis of evangelical anti-intellectualism and "an epistle from a wounded lover" by an intellectual who feels betrayed by evangelical Christianity's neglect of "sober analysis of nature, human society, and the arts". Scandal was named "Book of the Year" by Christianity Today, the popular neo-evangelical Christian magazine. In 2004, ten years after its initial publication, Christianity Today claimed that the book had "arguably shaped the evangelical world (or at least its institutions) more than any other book published in the last decade".
