= Hypsostromataceae =

Scientific classification
- Kingdom: Fungi
- Division: Ascomycota
- Class: Dothideomycetes
- Subclass: incertae sedis
- Family: Hypsostromataceae; Huhndorf (1994)

Type genus
- Hypsostroma Huhndorf (1992)

Family of fungi

The Hypsostromataceae are a family of fungi with an uncertain taxonomic placement in the class Dothideomycetes.
