= Becky Wilde =

British rower (born 1997)

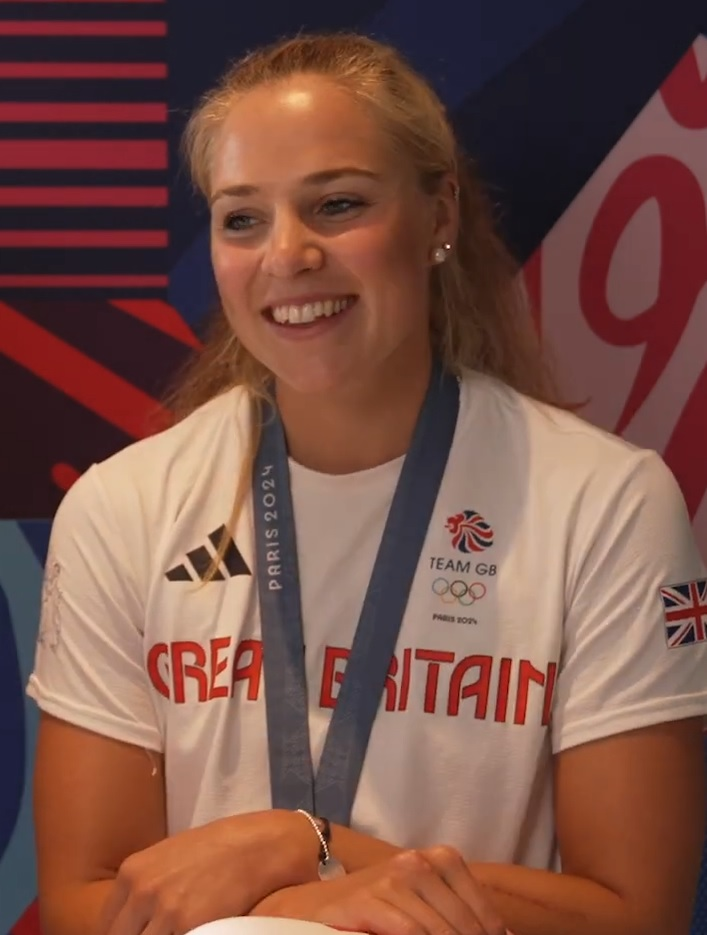
- Wilde at the 2024 Summer Olympics

Personal information
- Full name: Rebecca Wilde
- Born: 31 December 1997 (age 28)
- Education: Queen's College, Taunton; University of Bath

Sport
- Sport: Rowing
- Club: Leander Club
Medal record
Women's rowing
Representing Great Britain
Olympic Games
Bronze medal – third place	2024 Paris	Double sculls
World Championships
Silver medal – second place	2025 Shanghai	Quadruple sculls
European Championships
Gold medal – first place	2025 Plovdiv	Quadruple sculls

Rebecca Wilde (born 31 December 1997) is a British rower. She won a bronze in double sculls at the 2024 Summer Olympics in Paris.

== Early life ==
The daughter of P.E. teachers, she has a Welsh mother and English father. Formerly a swimmer, she was first inspired to take up rowing after watching the 2012 London Olympics, eventually switching sports in 2017. She represented the South of England in swimming at the London Youth Olympics in 2012. She attended Queens College, Taunton.

== Career ==
She is a member of Leander Club, and was formerly part of British Rowing's Performance Development Academy (PDA), based at the Team Bath Sports Training Village.

In November 2023 she had to undergo surgery for compartment syndrome in her forearms, and missed part of the rowing season. Alongside Mathilda Hodgkins-Byrne she qualified for the Paris 2024 Olympics in the double sculls at the World Rowing Final Olympic Qualification Regatta in Lucerne, Switzerland.

In June 2024, she was confirmed in the British squad for the 2024 Olympic Games in Paris. On 1 August 2024 Wilde and Hodgkins-Byrne won a bronze medal in the double sculls finishing behind gold medallists New Zealand and silver medallists Romania.

She moved to the quadruple sculls at the 2025 European Rowing Championships in Plovdiv, winning gold.

== Personal life ==
She studied Sport and Social Science at the University of Bath.

In March 2026, Wilde revealed she had previously been living with an eating disorder.
