= Margot Leeuwenburgh =

Dutch rower (born 1995)

Personal information
- Nationality: Dutch
- Born: 27 November 1995 (age 30)

Sport
- Country: Netherlands
- Sport: Rowing
- Event: Quadruple sculls
Medal record
Women's rowing
Representing the Netherlands
World Championships
Gold medal – first place	2025 Shanghai	Quadruple sculls
Gold medal – first place	2026 Amsterdam	Quadruple sculls
European Championships
Bronze medal – third place	2025 Plovdiv	Quadruple sculls

Margot Leeuwenburgh (born 27 November 1995) is a Dutch rower.

== Career ==
Leeuwenburgh competed at the 2025 European Rowing Championships and won a bronze medal in the quadruple sculls event. She then competed at the 2025 World Rowing Championships and won a gold medal in the quadruple sculls with a time of 6:32.92. This was the Netherland's first gold in the event at the World Rowing Championships since 2017.

In August 2026, she competed at the 2026 World Rowing Championships and won a gold medal in the quadruple sculls with a time of 6:08.18.
