= Lefferts Loetscher =

20th century American church historian

Lefferts Augustine Loetscher (1904–1981) was an American church historian.

Loetscher was born in Dubuque, Iowa, the son of Frederick W. Loetscher Sr., who was also a church historian, and the older brother of Frederick W. Loetscher Jr., an ornithologist. The Loetschers were descended from Swiss immigrants.

Loetscher studied at the Lawrenceville School, Princeton University, and Princeton Theological Seminary before serving as a Presbyterian minister in Pennsylvania. He obtained a PhD from the University of Pennsylvania and returned to the seminary in 1941 to teach, staying there until his retirement in 1974.

Loetscher specialized in American Presbyterian church history and wrote The Broadening Church (1954) on this topic. Along with Robert T. Handy and H. Shelton Smith, he also produced the two-volume American Christianity (1963).

As his father did before him, Loetscher served as the President of the American Society of Church History in 1962.
