= 2024 World Rowing Championships =

International rowing event

- Venue: Royal Canadian Henley Rowing Course
- Location: St. Catharines, Canada
- Dates: 18–25 August

The 2024 World Rowing Championships were held from 18 to 25 August 2024 at the Royal Canadian Henley Rowing Course in St. Catharines, Ontario, Canada. The championship was a combined event of the Senior, Under 23, and Under 19 championships, however only non-Olympic and Paralympic senior races were included in these Worlds due to the 2024 Summer Olympics and Paralympics.

== Overall medal table ==
* Host nation (Canada)

Rank	Nation	Gold	Silver	Bronze	Total
1	Romania	7	0	0	7
2	Great Britain	6	5	1	12
3	Germany	5	3	8	16
4	Italy	4	7	5	16
5	Greece	4	3	0	7
6	Poland	3	1	0	4
7	United States	2	6	2	10
8	Australia	2	2	3	7
9	New Zealand	2	1	1	4
10	Ireland	2	0	2	4
11	Spain	1	1	2	4
12	Austria	1	0	0	1
12	Chile	1	0	0	1
12	Mexico	1	0	0	1
15	Switzerland	0	2	0	2
16	France	0	1	4	5
17	Czech Republic	0	1	2	3
–	Individual Neutral Athletes	0	1	1	2
18	Paraguay	0	1	0	1
18	Peru	0	1	0	1
18	South Africa	0	1	0	1
18	Sweden	0	1	0	1
22	Belgium	0	0	2	2
23	China	0	0	1	1
23	Lithuania	0	0	1	1
23	Moldova	0	0	1	1
Totals (25 entries)		41	38	36	115

== Senior ==
=== Medal table ===
* Host nation (Canada)

Rank	Nation	Gold	Silver	Bronze	Total
1	Ireland	1	0	1	2
1	Italy	1	0	1	2
3	Austria	1	0	0	1
3	Mexico	1	0	0	1
3	Poland	1	0	0	1
3	Romania	1	0	0	1
7	Greece	0	2	0	2
8	Paraguay	0	1	0	1
8	Peru	0	1	0	1
8	United States	0	1	0	1
11	Germany	0	0	1	1
11	Moldova	0	0	1	1
Totals (12 entries)		6	5	4	15

=== Men ===
Event	Gold		Silver		Bronze	
Lightweight events
LM1x	Paul O'Donovan; Ireland	6:49.68	Antonios Papakonstantinou; Greece	6:51.90	Niels Torre; Italy	6:52.64
LM4x	Mexico (b) José Navarro (2) Marco Antonio Velázquez Ugalde (3) Miguel Carballo Nieto (s) Rafael Mejía Gutiérrez	5:47.39	United States (b) James McCullough (2) Casey Howshall (3) Ian Richardson (s) Jasper Liu	5:47.74	Germany (b) Tim Streib (2) Moritz Marchart (3) Fabio Kress (s) Joachim Agne	5:50.52
LM2-	Austria (b) Konrad Hultsch (s) Paul Ruttmann	6:34.78	Paraguay (b) Matías Ramírez (s) Alberto Portillo	6:42.54	Moldova (b) Nichita Naumciuc (s) Dmitrii Zincenco	6:44.57

=== Women ===
Event	Gold		Silver		Bronze	
Lightweight events
LW1x	Ionela Cozmiuc; Romania	7:29.92	Zoi Fitsiou; Greece	7:31.65	Siobhán McCrohan; Ireland	7:32.94
LW2-	Poland (b) Jessika Sobocińska (s) Katarzyna Wełna	7:17.02 WB	Peru (b) Alessia Palacios (s) Valeria Palacios	7:28.07	Not awarded	

=== Pararowing ===
Event	Gold		Silver	Bronze
PR3M2-	Italy (b) Luca Conti (s) Igor Zappa	7:29.26	Not awarded	

== Under 23 ==
=== Medal table ===
* Host nation (Canada)

Rank	Nation	Gold	Silver	Bronze	Total
1	Great Britain	5	0	1	6
2	Germany	4	1	3	8
3	New Zealand	2	1	1	4
4	Poland	2	1	0	3
5	Romania	2	0	0	2
6	United States	1	4	0	5
7	Australia	1	2	2	5
8	Spain	1	1	0	2
9	Ireland	1	0	1	2
10	Chile	1	0	0	1
10	Greece	1	0	0	1
12	Italy	0	5	3	8
13	Switzerland	0	2	0	2
14	Czech Republic	0	1	0	1
14	Sweden	0	1	0	1
16	France	0	0	4	4
17	Belgium	0	0	2	2
18	Lithuania	0	0	1	1
Totals (18 entries)		21	19	18	58

=== Men ===
Event	Gold		Silver		Bronze	
Openweight events
M1x	Timo Strache; Germany	6:42.08	Erik Källström; Sweden	6:44.46	Aaron Andries; Belgium	6:45.05
M2x	Poland (b) Jakub Woźniak (s) Konrad Domański	6:11.09	Australia (b) Dominic Frederico (s) Nicholas Blackman	6:13.09	Ireland (b) Adam Murphy (s) Brian Colsh	6:15.80
M4x	Poland (b) Mikołaj Kulka (2) Michał Rańda (3) Cezary Litka (s) Daniel Gałęza	5:39.53	Czech Republic (b) Vit Baldinus (2) Jan Čížek (3) Martin Ježek (s) Michal Zindulka	5:39.90	Italy (b) Luca Enea Mulas (2) Marco Selva (3) Leonardo Tedoldi (s) Andrea Pazzagli	5:40.19
M2-	New Zealand (b) Joshua Vodanovich (s) Oliver Welch	6:19.70	Germany (b) Tobias Strangemann (s) Johannes Benien	6:20.62	Italy (b) Alessandro Timpanaro (s) Edoardo Caramaschi	6:20.88
M4-	Great Britain (b) Joshua Brangan (2) Fergus Woolnough (3) Harry Geffen (s) Jake Wincomb	5:45.29	Australia (b) Nikolas Pender (2) Austin Reinehr (3) Jarrod Lord (s) Mitch Salisbury	5:46.89	New Zealand (b) Benjamin Shortt (2) Edward Lopas (3) Callum Tutbury (s) Joshua Gordon	5:47.01
M4+	United States (b) Leo Bessler (2) Braden Porterfield (3) Miles Hudgins (s) Josh Diggons (c) Iliad Izadi	6:15.55	Italy (b) Simone Pappalepore (2) Matteo Belgeri (3) Andrea Licatalosi (s) Giuseppe Bellomo (c) Filippo Wiesenfeld	6:19.71	France (b) Louis Descot-Vigouroux (2) Awen Thomas (3) Lucas Fauché (s) Grégoire Charles (c) Lucie Mercier	6:20.45
M8+	Great Britain (b) Toby Lassen (2) Zachary Day (3) Cameron Beyki (4) Gus John (5) Gabriel Obholzer (6) Tyler Horler (7) Luca Ferraro (s) Louis Nares (c) Tom Bryce	5:24.73	United States (b) Blake Vogel (2) Kian Aminian (3) Wilson Morton (4) Matthew Davis (5) Keelan Good (6) Julian Thomas (7) Jason Kennedy (s) Samuel Sullivan (c) Sammy Houdaigui	5:27.50	Australia (b) James Frederikson (2) Henry Furrer (3) Jeremy Beale (4) Alexander Baroni (5) Harry Manton (6) Andrew Weightman (7) Edward Nutt (s) Benjamin Scott (c) Jonathon Cooke	5:29.43
Lightweight events
LM1x	Caetano Horta; Spain	6:46.65	Giovanni Borgonovo; Italy	6:51.98	Moritz Küpper; Germany	6:53.11
LM2x	Ireland (b) Ciaran Purdy (s) Donnacha Keeley	6:14.58	Italy (b) Luca Borgonovo (s) Nicolo Demiliani	6:15.33	France (b) Antoine Lefebvre (s) Cornélus Palsma	6:16.07
LM4x	Germany (b) Paul Maissenhälter (2) Philip Kaltenborn (3) Simon Haible (s) Maximilian Rühling	5:49.63	Not awarded only two crews			
LM2-	Chile (b) Manuel Fernández Antri (s) Felipe Guerra	6:52.11	United States (b) George Drago (s) Harrison Azrak	6:53.65	Not awarded only three crews	

=== Women ===
Event	Gold		Silver		Bronze	
Openweight events
W1x	Alexandra Föster; Germany	7:13.69	Aurelia-Maxima Janzen; Switzerland	7:16.47	Mazarine Guilbert; Belgium	7:18.62
W2x	Romania (b) Andrada-Maria Moroșanu (s) Iulia Bălăucă	6:46.84	Switzerland (b) Flavia Lötscher (s) Olivia Roth	6:49.27	Lithuania (b) Ugnė Juzėnaitė (s) Saulė Kryževičiūtė	6:51.87
W4x	Romania (b) Mariana-Laura Dumitru (2) Manuela-Gabriela Lungu (3) Emanuela-Ioana Ciotău (s) Patricia Cireș	6:15.97	Poland (b) Kinga Kusiowska (2) Rozalia Linowska (3) Anna Khlibenko (s) Gabriela Stefaniak	6:18.18	Great Britain (b) Finnola Stratton (2) Megan Knight (3) Lily Abbott (s) Ellie Cooke	6:19.36
W2-	Great Britain (b) Holly Youd (s) Anna Grace	7:03.84	Spain (b) Naroa Zubimendi (s) Emma Alimbau Borras	7:05.29	France (b) Léa Herscovici (s) Fleur Vaucoret	7:05.93
W4-	Great Britain (b) Arianna Forde (2) Grace Richards (3) Philippa Emery (s) Jessica Martin	6:22.29	New Zealand (b) Lucy Burrell (2) Rebecca Leigh (3) Madeleine Parker (s) Alice Fahey	6:23.30	Australia (b) Caitlin McManus Barrett (2) Rebecca Pretorius (3) Genevieve Hart (s) Isabella Scammell	6:26.37
W4+	New Zealand (b) Orla Fitzgerald (2) Charlotte Darry (3) Jane Schellekens (s) Isobel Eliadis-Watson (c) Oliver Duncan	7:03.00	United States (b) Olivia Bachert (2) Olivia Meskan (3) Jordan Freer (s) Anna Garrison (c) Carly Legenzowski	7:04.83	Italy (b) Samantha Premerl (2) Anita Boldrino (3) Francesca Rubeo (s) Chiara Benvenuti (c) Ilaria Colombo	7:09.90
W8+	Great Britain (b) Harriet Drake-Lee (2) Julia Hunt-Davis (3) Alice Baker (4) Amber Harwood (5) Abigail Dawson (6) Rhianna Sumpter (7) Ellie-Kate Hutchinson (s) Olivia Hill (c) Hermione Hill	6:06.58	United States (b) Hannah Smith (2) Natalie Hoefer (3) Kathryn Serra (4) Aine Ley (5) Dahlia Levine (6) Joely Cherniss (7) Katherine Kelly (s) Margot Leroux (c) Zoe Tekeian	6:08.35	Germany (b) Michelle Lebahn (2) Chiara Saccomando (3) Eva Weitzel (4) Ricarda Heuser (5) Antonia Galland (6) Harrier Wappler-Niemeyer (7) Olivia Clotten (s) Luise Bachmann (c) Magdalena Hallay	6:08.61
Lightweight events
LW1x	Grace Sypher; Australia	7:32.47	Giulia Clerici; Italy	7:37.52	Kristin Burkert-Scholz; Germany	7:38.02
LW2x	Greece (b) Dimitra Kontou (s) Evangelia Anastasiadou	6:44.63	Italy (b) Elena Sali (s) Alice Ramella	6:52.47	France (b) Elea Cloutier (s) Rose Gallen	6:57.64
LW4x	Germany (b) Charlotte Eyltjes (2) Rebekka Falkenberg (3) Claire Light (s) Helena Brenke	6:48.90	Not awarded only two crews			

== Under 19 ==
=== Medal table ===
* Host nation (Canada)

Rank	Nation	Gold	Silver	Bronze	Total
1	Romania	4	0	0	4
2	Italy	3	2	1	6
3	Greece	3	1	0	4
4	Great Britain	1	5	0	6
5	Germany	1	2	4	7
6	United States	1	1	2	4
7	Australia	1	0	1	2
–	Individual Neutral Athletes	0	1	1	2
8	France	0	1	0	1
8	South Africa	0	1	0	1
10	Czech Republic	0	0	2	2
10	Spain	0	0	2	2
12	China	0	0	1	1
Totals (12 entries)		14	14	14	42

=== Men ===
Event	Gold		Silver		Bronze	
Openweight events
M1x	Panagiotis Makrygiannis; Greece	7:23.11	Maksim Hrybouski; Independent Neutral Athletes	7:24.56	Ole Hohensee; Germany	7:28.50
M2x	Greece (b) Konstantinos Giannoulis (s) Nikolaos Cholopoulos	6:50.18	Germany (b) Julius Klein (s) Simon Gimplinger	6:52.74	Australia (b) Luca Free (s) Alexander Williams	6:53.50
M4x	Germany (b) Jonathan Ebel (2) Felix Krones (3) Oscar Krause (s) Mads Schmied	6:11.55	Italy (b) Pietro Zampaglione (2) Josef Giorgio Marvucic (3) Andrea Frigo (s) Maximilian Riboni	6:12.98	Czech Republic (b) Matěj Smejkal (2) Martin Houska (3) Tomáš Kala (s) Antonin Strelba	6:17.82
M2-	Romania (b) Mateus Simion Cozminciuc (s) Fabrizio Alexandru Scripcariu	7:03.69	Germany (b) Lars Trampert (s) Maximilian Brill	7:03.87	Spain (b) Rafael Gomez Guerrero (s) Ramon Palomino Goenechea	7:07.53
M4-	Italy (b) Leonardo Sostegni (2) Luca Cassina (3) Filippo Bancora (s) Giovanni Paoli	6:23.61	Great Britain (b) Gabriel George (2) Christian Reese (3) Alp Karadogan (s) Patrick Wild	6:25.96	China (b) Lin Zhiyan (2) Luo Xuancheng (3) Ju Xinzhe (s) Guo Jinmeng	6:29.43
M4+	Australia (b) Samuel Basha (2) Matias Moloney (3) Tomas Moloney (s) Ambrose Hennessey (c) Henry Burton	6:39.36	Italy (b) Michele Minazzato (2) Luigi Festorazzi (3) Gioele Re (s) Jacopo Cappagli (c) Riccardo Doni	6:41.20	United States (b) Aemon Morlan (2) Aidan Montanaro (3) Ryan Jorgensen (s) Thomas Carpenter (c) John Mershon	6:43.57
M8+	Great Britain (b) Harry Oliver (2) Oliver Richardson (3) William Harper (4) Elam Hughes (5) Edward Bayfield (6) Alec Wild (7) Leo Hainlein (s) Timothy Gutsev (c) Edward Crossthwaite-Eyre	5:55.85	United States (b) Hugh Ryan (2) Francis McGrath (3) Kyle Fox (4) Tyler Murphy (5) Ori Radwin (6) Bailey Foster (7) Taeden Landa (s) Keenan Heinz (c) Michael Kain	5:57.92	Germany (b) Jannik Elsner (2) Georg Rieck (3) Marcus Albrecht (4) Felix Zeymer (5) Alex Ian Aderhold (6) Jonas Frommhold (7) Hugo Thomas (s) Jakob Knapp (c) Sadeepa Jagoda	6:00.28

=== Women ===
Event	Gold		Silver		Bronze	
Openweight events
W1x	Bianca Camelia Ifteni; Romania	8:22.63	Danelia Price-Hughes; South Africa	8:26.34	Julia Stoeber; Germany	8:29.09
W2x	Greece (b) Gavriela Lioliou (s) Varvara Lykomitrou	7:39.90	Great Britain (b) Olivia Cheesmur (s) Violet Holbrow-Brooksbank	7:45.82	Spain (b) Karla Remacha Pusco (s) Esther Fuerte Chacon	7:47.46
W4x	Italy (b) Noemi de Vincenzi (2) Beatrice Ravini Perelli (3) Valentina Mascheroni (s) Melissa Schincariol	6:56.14	Great Britain (b) Eloise Etherington (2) Catherine Gardner (3) Amalka Delevante (s) Mia Lawrence	6:57.49	Germany (b) Charlotte Scholz (2) Antonia Schluesller (3) Lanea Estelle Rueter (s) Tia Haeusler	7:00.41
W2-	Romania (b) Iulica Maria Ursu (s) Gabriela Tivodariu	7:39.27	Greece (b) Nefeli Ntara (s) Dimitra Papaioannou	7:48.51	Independent Neutral Athlete (b) Dziyana Plisava (s) Kira Kavalenka	7:51.82
W4-	Romania (b) Ionela Elena Scutaru (2) Adina Alexandra Florea (3) Stejara Olariu (s) Bianca Elena Draghici	7:06.42	Great Britain (b) Emily Nicholas (2) Acorn Cassidy (3) Emily Shaw (s) Martha Shepherd	7:08.71	Czech Republic (b) Simona Pavlikova (2) Ella Boldisova (3) Michaela Ulicna (s) Eva Slepickova	7:10.69
W4+	Italy (b) Marta Orefice (2) Giulia Orefice (3) Carolina Cassani (s) Letizia Martorana (c) Margherita Fanchi	7:18.14	France (b) Lou Phillipe (2) Daphne Belin (3) Lola Goessens (s) Nina Blain (c) Baia Rocher Juge	7:27.75	United States (b) Eden Alfi (2) Alexis Gormley (3) Chloe Frushtick (s) Kathryn Dahl (c) Avery Harries-Jones	7:28.40
W8+	United States (b) Delaney Lundberg (2) Emily Tierney (3) Lia Nathan (4) Cecily Shaber (5) Claire van Praagh (6) Charlotte Jett (7) Lauren Dubois (s) Carly Brown (c) Lucy Herrick	6:39.57	Great Britain (b) Abigail Smith (2) Ansley Vicars (3) Emily Downing (4) Izabella Habdank-Toczyska (5) Sophie Sinclair (6) Amelia Westbrook (7) Ava Thurnham (s) Sophie Haisman (c) Victor Bocquet (m)	6:45.20	Italy (b) Maria Vittoria Crevatin (2) Letizia Martorana (3) Carolina Cassani (4) Sara Lucia Caterisano (5) Matilde Orsetti (6) Giulia Orefice (7) Marta Orefice (s) Vittoria Pastorelli (c) Margherita Fanchi	6:49.03
