= Andrada-Maria Moroșanu =

Romanian rower (born 2002)

Personal information
- Nationality: Romanian
- Born: 27 March 2002 (age 24)

Sport
- Country: Romania
- Sport: Rowing
Medal record
Women's rowing
Representing Romania
World Championships
Gold medal – first place	2025 Shanghai	Mixed eight
European Championships
Bronze medal – third place	2026 Varese	W4x
World U23 Championships
Gold medal – first place	2024 St. Catharines	W2x

Andrada-Maria Moroșanu (born 27 March 2002) is a Romanian rower.

== Career ==
In August 2024, Moroșanu competed at the 2024 World U23 Championships and won a gold medal in the double sculls with a time of 6:46.84. In September 2025, she competed at 2025 World Rowing Championships and won a gold medal in the mixed eight with a world best time of 5:34.46. The event made its debut at the World Rowing Championships.

In August 2026, she competed at the 2026 European Rowing Championships and won a bronze medal in the quadruple sculls with a time of 6:14.40. Weeks later she competed at the 2026 World Rowing Championships and finished in fifth place in the quadruple sculls.
