= Clancy Blair =

American psychologist

- Born: Clarence Bissell Blair Jr. December 27, 1960
- Died: December 19, 2024 (aged 63)
- Education: McGill University; University of Alabama at Birmingham
- Known for: Research on the development of emotional self-regulation in children
- Scientific career
- Fields: Developmental psychology
- Workplaces: Pennsylvania State University; New York University
- Thesis: School adjustment: Risk and resilience in the early elementary grades (1996)
- Doctoral advisor: Craig T. Ramey

Clarence Bissell Blair Jr. (December 27, 1960 – December 19, 2024) was an American developmental psychologist and a professor of cognitive psychology in the Steinhardt School of Culture, Education, and Human Development at New York University. He previously taught at Pennsylvania State University for ten years. He is known for his research on the development of emotional self-regulation in children.

== Selected publications ==
- Blair, C. (2002). School readiness: Integrating cognition and emotion in a neurobiological conceptualization of child functioning at school entry. American Psychologist, 57, 111–127.
- Blair, C. (2010). Stress and the development of self-regulation in context. Child Development Perspectives, 4, 181–188.
- Blair, C. & Raver, C.C. (2012). Child development in the context of adversity: Experiential canalization of brain and behavior. American Psychologist, 67, 309–318.
- Blair, C. (2016). Developmental science and executive function. Current Directions in Psychological Science, 25, 3–7.
