= Jonathan Butler (historian) =

American historian

Jonathan M. Butler (born 1945) was a historian of religion. He was formerly employed as a lecturer by the Seventh-day Adventist Church.

== Biography ==
Jonathan Butler earned a BA in religion at La Sierra College (1967) and an M.Div. at Andrews University before completing his doctorate at the University of Chicago (1975).

He worked as an associate professor of church history at Loma Linda University in California, and also taught at Union College in Nebraska. He was co-editor of the magazine Adventist Heritage.

Other historians have praised his historical writing. The authors of Seeking a Sanctuary describe:

The most valuable contribution to the study of the denomination's formative period is still Jonathan M. Butler's landmark essay, "Adventism and the American Experience," [...]

He authored an article in 1979 claiming Ellen White's endtime scenario was culturally conditioned to the point of being more at place in her time than now. Walter Rea describes it as "a brilliant piece," which "sent shock waves through the church".

Yet like numerous other authors, the church found his writings on White and other history challenging and difficult to cope with officially. He claimed, "many of the names identified with advances in Ellen White studies" (including himself) are no longer in church employment, "and most of them are no longer active church members." Butler later stopped working as an academic historian.

== Publications ==
Butler has authored publications on the debate over the inspiration of Ellen White, charismatic experiences in early Adventism (see: charismatic Adventism), and others.

=== Books and book chapters ===
- The Disappointed: Millerism and Millenarianism in the Nineteenth Century (Bloomington, Indiana University Press, 1987), co-edited with Ronald Numbers
- "Adventism and the American Experience" chapter in The Rise of Adventism: A Commentary on the Social and Religious Ferment of Mid-Nineteenth Century America, edited by Edwin Scott Gaustad (Harper & Row, 1974)
- Butler with Rennie B. Schoepflin, "Charismatic Women and Health: Mary Baker Eddy, Ellen G. White, and Aimee Semple McPherson", p337–365 in Women, Health, and Medicine in America: A Historical Handbook, ed. Rima D. Apple (New York: Garland, 1990)
- "The Historian as Heretic", introduction to Ronald Numbers, Prophetess of Health, 2nd edn. onwards, p1–41. Reprinted in Spectrum 23:2 (August 1993), 43–64
- Softly and Tenderly: Heaven and Hell in American Revivalism, 1870–1920. Carlson Publishing, 1991

=== Articles ===
- "Theological Roots of Pentecostalism", Church History 58:3 (S 1989), p408–409; a review of Donald Dayton's 1987 book of the same name
- "Thunder and Trumpets: Millerites and Dissenting Religion in Upstate New York, 1800–1850". Church History, 55:2 (1986), p240–241
- "From Millerism to Seventh-Day Adventism: 'boundlessness to consolidation'". Church History, 55:1 (1986), p50–64
- "Prophecy, Gender, and Culture: Ellen Gould Harmon (White) and the Roots of Seventh-day Adventism." Religion and American Culture 1 (1991), p3–29; JSTOR link

== See also ==
- New religious movement
- History of the Seventh-day Adventist Church
