= Flavia Lötscher =

Swiss rower (born 2004)

Personal information
- Born: 28 December 2004 (age 21)

Sport
- Country: Switzerland
- Sport: Rowing
Medal record
Women's rowing
Representing Switzerland
World U23 Championships
Silver medal – second place	2024 St. Catharines	W2x
European Championships
Gold medal – first place	2026 Varese	W4x

Flavia Lötscher (born 28 December 2004) is a Swiss rower.

== Career ==
Loetscher competed at the 2024 World Rowing U23 Championships and won a silver medal in the women's double scull, along with Olivia Roth.

She competed at the 2026 European Rowing Championships and won a gold medal in the women's quadruple sculls. This marked Switzerland's first ever women's medal in a large boat at the European Rowing Championships.

== Personal life ==
Her older sister, Lisa, is also a rower.
