= Hannah Scott (rower) =

Northern Irish rower (born 1999)

Hannah Scott MBE
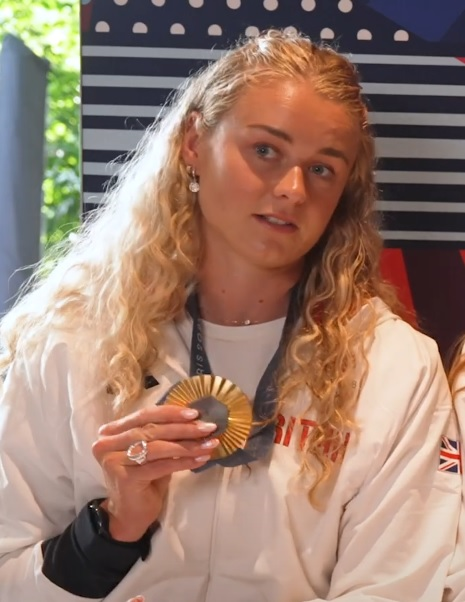
- Scott at the 2024 Summer Olympics

Personal information
- Full name: Hannah Elizabeth Scott
- Nationality: British, Northern Irish
- Born: 18 June 1999 (age 27) Coleraine, Northern Ireland
- Height: 1.78 m (5 ft 10 in)

Sport
- Country: Great Britain
- Sport: Rowing
- Club: Bann Rowing Club; Princeton University; Leander Club
- Coached by: Geoff Bones; Lori Dauphiny; Lauren Fisher
Medal record
Women's rowing
Representing Great Britain
Olympic Games
Gold medal – first place	2024 Paris	Quadruple sculls
World Championships
Gold medal – first place	2023 Belgrade	Quadruple sculls
Silver medal – second place	2025 Shanghai	Quadruple sculls
Silver medal – second place	2026 Amsterdam	Quadruple sculls
European Championships
Gold medal – first place	2024 Szeged	Quadruple sculls
Silver medal – second place	2021 Varese	Quadruple sculls
Bronze medal – third place	2023 Bled	Quadruple sculls
World U23 Championships
Silver medal – second place	2018 Poznań	Coxless pair
Silver medal – second place	2019 Sarasota	Eight

Hannah Elizabeth Scott (born 18 June 1999) is a rower from Coleraine, Northern Ireland. Scott has received three medals from the European Rowing Championships between 2021 and 2024 in the quadruple sculls. At the World Rowing U23 Championships, she was second in the pairs event during 2018 and third in women's eight during 2019. Her quadruple sculls team were first at the 2023 World Rowing Championships and the 2024 Summer Olympics. With her Olympics victory, "Scott [was] the first female gold medallist from Northern Ireland since ... 1972." Scott became a Member of the Order of the British Empire during 2025.

== Early life and education ==
Scott was born in Coleraine, Northern Ireland on 18 June 1999. She attended D.H. Christie Memorial Primary School. She became interested in rowing during her teenage years. At the Irish Indoor Rowing Championship, she won the WJ16 division in 2015 and the WJ18 division during 2017.

As an Irish Rowing Championships competitor, she won five medals in 2015. These included gold in the coxless four and silver in the double scull. The following year, she was second during the double scull and third in the eight. Scott was their Junior Single Sculls winner during 2017. Scott rowed at Princeton University during the late 2010s.

In part fulfilment of her degree course, she chose to write a dissertation on how Brexit affected people in Northern Ireland: "The main driver for bringing us back together was sport", she observed.

== Career ==
As a World Rowing U23 Championships competitor, Scott and Heidi Long were second in the Pairs event during 2018. She was one of the women's eight competitors that finished second at the following edition. Scott was selected for the 2020 Summer Olympics. She competed in the quadruple sculls with Great Britain during the Olympics and finished in seventh.

During the 2021 European Rowing Championships, Scott won a silver medal in the quadruple sculls in Varese, Italy. She entered the single sculls event at the 2022 World Rowing Championships and was fifth. This was followed by a bronze medal at the 2023 European Rowing Championships in quadruple sculls.

At the 2023 World Rowing Championships in Belgrade, she won the gold medal in the quadruple sculls with Lauren Henry, Georgina Brayshaw and Lola Anderson. In this division, they were first during the 2024 European Rowing Championships. The team went on to win the gold medal in the quadruple sculls at the 2024 Summer Olympics. This made "Scott ... the first female gold medallist from Northern Ireland since ... 1972."

== Awards and personal life ==
During 2024, Scott was co-nominated by World Rowing as part of their Women's Crew of the Year category. Scott was appointed Member of the Order of the British Empire (MBE) in the 2025 New Year Honours for services to rowing. She received her award from the Princess Royal on 27 March 2025. During the early 2020s, she experienced osteopenia.
