= Frederick W. Loetscher Jr. =

American ornithologist

Frederick William Loetscher Jr. (6 June 1913 – 2 April 2006) was an American ornithologist.

He was the son of Frederick W. Loetscher Sr., a church historian who taught at Princeton Theological Seminary, and the brother of Lefferts Loetscher, also a church historian. The Loetschers were descended from Swiss immigrants.

Loetscher studied at Yale University before becoming the first person to obtain a PhD in ornithology from Cornell University. He taught biology at Centre College from 1946 until his retirement in 1979.

Loetscher specialized in bird calls. A subspecies of the olive-backed euphonia was named Euphonia gouldi loetscheri in his honor in 1966, but its existence as a distinct subspecies has been disputed.

Loetscher served in the United States Army Medical Corps in World War II and was an elder in the Presbyterian Church.
