= Barbara Brown Zikmund =

American historian of religion (1939–2026)

Barbara Brown Zikmund (October 16, 1939 – August 18, 2026) was an American historian of religion.

== Life and career ==
Barbara Brown Zikmund was a 1961 graduate of Beloit College. Zikmund married Joseph Zikmund in 1961, and with him has one son. In 1964 she was ordained a minister in the United Church of Christ, the same year in which she received a Woodrow Wilson Fellowship; in 1969, she received her PhD from Duke University. Much of her research has focused on the role in American religious life played by ordained women; other of her work has been done on the history of the United Church of Christ. She was coauthor of Clergy Women, published in 1998, a study on the role of women in clergy. She also served as the editor for a history of the United Church of Christ in seven volumes, titled The Living Theological Heritage of the United Church of Christ and published from 1995 until 2005. As a facilitator of interfaith relations, Zikmund was a member of the Interfaith Relations Committee of the National Council of Churches, in which role she served from 1991 until 2007; seven of those years, she spent as chair of the committee. From 1981, she was academic dean at the Pacific School of Religion; from the latter year until 2000, she was president of Hartford Seminary. She was also the first woman to serve as president of the Association of Theological Schools of the United States and Canada, from 1986 until 1988; from 1984 to 1992, she was on the World Council of Churches Programme for Theological Education. Later in her career Zikmund taught in Japan; she has also been a visiting scholar at the Catholic University of America and at Wesley Theological Seminary. Zikmund has also served as an alumna trustee at Beloit College, which awarded her its 25th Reunion Award in 1986. Her papers are held by the library of Columbia University.

Zikmund died on August 18, 2026, at the age of 86.
