= Frederick W. Loetscher Sr. =

Frederick William Loetscher Sr. (15 May 1875 – 31 July 1966) was an American church historian.

Loetscher was the son of Swiss immigrants and was born in Dubuque, Iowa. He obtained degrees from Princeton University and Princeton Theological Seminary and did further study in Berlin and Strasbourg. Loetscher then returned to the United States and pastored Oxford Presbyterian Church in Pennsylvania from 1907 to 1910.

Loetscher then returned to the Princeton Seminary, serving Professor of Homiletics from 1910 to 1913, and Archibald Alexander Professor of Church History from 1913 until his retirement in 1945. After his retirement Loetscher taught at Temple University until 1951. He was awarded a D.D. by Lafayette College in 1904 and a LL.D. by University of Dubuque in 1918.

Loetscher served as editor of the Journal of the Presbyterian Historical Society, and was a charter member of the American Society of Church History after its reorganization in 1916. He served as its president in 1934.

Loetscher had three children: Lefferts Loetscher (1904–1981), also a church historian; Helen Mildred Skinner (1907–1944); and Frederick W. Loetscher Jr. (1913–2006), an ornithologist.
