= Mark Noll =

American historian (born 1946)

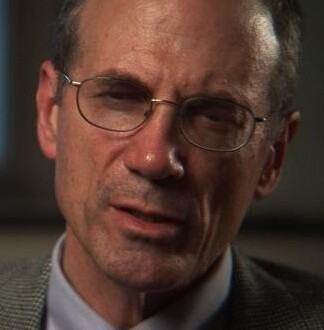
- Born: Mark Allan Noll; July 18, 1946 (age 80); Iowa City, Iowa United States
- Awards: National Humanities Medal (2006)

Academic background
- Education: Wheaton College; University of Iowa; Trinity Evangelical Divinity School; Vanderbilt University
- Thesis: Church Membership and the American Revolution (1975)

Academic work
- Discipline: History
- Institutions: Wheaton College; University of Notre Dame; Regent College
- Notable students: John G. Stackhouse Jr.

Mark Allan Noll (born 1946) is an American historian specializing in the history of Christianity in the United States. He holds the position of research professor of history at Regent College, having previously been Francis A. McAnaney Professor of History at the University of Notre Dame. Noll is a Reformed evangelical Christian and in 2005 was named by Time magazine as one of the twenty-five most influential evangelicals in America.

== Biography ==
Born on July 18, 1946, Noll is a graduate of Wheaton College, Illinois (B.A., English), the University of Iowa (M.A., English), Trinity Evangelical Divinity School (M.A., Church History and Theology), and Vanderbilt University (Ph.D., History of Christianity). Before joining the faculty of Notre Dame, he was on the faculty at Wheaton College, Illinois for twenty-seven years, where he taught in the departments of history and theology as McManis Professor of Christian Thought. While at Wheaton, Noll also co-founded (with Nathan Hatch) and directed the Institute for the Study of American Evangelicals (ISAE), which ran from 1982 until 2014.

Noll is a prolific author and many of his books have earned considerable acclaim within the academic community. In particular, The Scandal of the Evangelical Mind, a book about anti-intellectual tendencies within the American evangelical movement, was widely covered in both religious and secular publications. He was awarded a National Humanities Medal in the Oval Office by President George W. Bush in 2006.

Noll, along with other historians such as George Marsden, Nathan O. Hatch, and David Bebbington, has greatly contributed to the world's understanding of evangelical convictions and attitudes, past and present. He has caused many scholars and lay people to realize more deeply the complications inherent in the question, "Is America a Christian nation?"

In 1994, he co-signed Evangelicals and Catholics Together, an ecumenical document that expressed the need for greater cooperation between evangelical and Catholic leaders in the United States.

From 2006 to 2016, Noll was a faculty member in Department of History at Notre Dame. He replaced the retiring George Marsden as Notre Dame's Francis A. McAnaney Professor of History. Noll stated that the move to Notre Dame allowed him to concentrate on fewer subjects than his duties at Wheaton had allowed.

== Works ==
=== Books ===
- Noll, Mark A.; Woodbridge, John D.; Hatch, Nathan O. (1979). The Gospel in America: Themes in the Story of America's Evangelicals. Grand Rapids, MI: Zondervan. ISBN 978-0-31037240-0. OCLC 04037003.
- ———; Hatch, Nathan O., eds. (1982). The Bible in America: essays in cultural history. New York: Oxford University Press.
- ———, ed. (1983). Eerdmans' handbook to Christianity in America. Grand Rapids, MI: Eerdmans. ISBN 978-0-80283582-6.
- ——— (1986). Between Faith and Criticism; Evangelicals, Scholarship and The Bible In America. Harper & Row. ISBN 978-0-06066302-5.
- ——— (1988). One Nation Under God: Christian Faith and Political Action in America. HarperCollins. ISBN 978-0-06066303-2.
- ——— (1989). Religion and American Politics: From the Colonial Period to the 1980s. Oxford University Press.
- ——— , Hatch, Nathan O, Marsden, George M., (1989). The Search for Christian America. Helmers & Howard.
- ———, ed. (1989). Enlightenment in the Era of Samuel Stanhope Smith. Princeton University Press.
- ——— (1990). Princeton and the Republic, 1768–1822: The Search for Christian Religion and American politics : from the colonial period to the 1980s. New York: Oxford University Press.
- ——— (1992). A History of Christianity in the United States and Canada. Grand Rapids, MI: Eerdmans.
- ——— (1994). The Scandal of the Evangelical Mind. Grand Rapids, MI: Eerdmans.
- ——— (1997). Seasons of Grace. Grand Rapids, MI: Baker.
- ——— (1997). Turning Points: Decisive Moments in the History of Christianity. Grand Rapids, MI: Baker. ISBN 978-0-80105778-6.
- ——— (2000). American Evangelical Christianity: An Introduction. Blackwell Publishing.
- ——— (2000). Protestants in America (Religion in American Life). Oxford University Press.
- ——— (2001). God and Mammon: Protestants, Money, and the Market, 1790–1860. Oxford University Press.
- ——— (2001). The Old Religion in a New World: The History of North American Christianity. Grand Rapids, MI: Eerdmans.
- ——— (2001). The Princeton Theology 1812–1921 : Scripture, Science, and Theological Method from Archibald Alexander to Benjamin Breckinridge Warfield. Grand Rapids, MI: Baker Academic.
- ——— (2002). America's God: From Jonathan Edwards to Abraham Lincoln. Oxford University Press.
- ——— (2002). The Work We Have to Do: A History of Protestants in America. Oxford University Press.
- ——— (2004). The Rise of Evangelicalism: The Age of Edwards, Whitefield, and the Wesleys (A History of Evangelicalism). InterVarsity Press.
- ———; Nystrom, Carolyn (2005). Is the Reformation Over? An Evangelical Assessment of Contemporary Roman Catholicism. Grand Rapids, MI: Baker Books.
- ——— (2006). Christians in the American Revolution. Regent College Publishing.
- ——— (2006). The Civil War as a Theological Crisis. University of North Carolina Press.
- ——— (2007). What Happened to Christian Canada?. Regent College Publishing.
- ——— (2009). The New Shape of World Christianity: How American Experience Reflects Global Faith. InterVarsity Press.
- ——— (2010). God and Race in American Politics: A Short History. Princeton University Press.
- ———; Nystrom, Carolyn (2011). Clouds of Witnesses: Christian Voices from Africa and Asia. InterVarsity Press.
- ——— (2011). Protestantism: A Very Short Introduction. Oxford University Press.
- ——— (2011). Jesus Christ and the Life of the Mind. Grand Rapids, MI: Eerdmans.
- ——— (2014). From Every Tribe and Nation: A Historian's Discovery of the Global Christian Story. Grand Rapids, MI: Baker Academic.
- ——— (2015). In The Beginning Was the Word: The Bible in American Public Life, 1492–1783. Oxford University Press.
- ——— (2022). America's Book: The Rise and Decline of a Bible Civilization, 1794–1911. Oxford University Press. ISBN 978-0-19762346-6.

=== Articles ===
- ——— (October 2004). "The Evangelical Mind Today". First Things.
- ——— (June 2006). "What Happened to Christian Canada?". Church History. 75 (2): 245–73. doi:10.1017/S000964070011131X. S2CID 162782418.
