= Lola Anderson =

British rower (born 1998)

Lola Anderson MBE
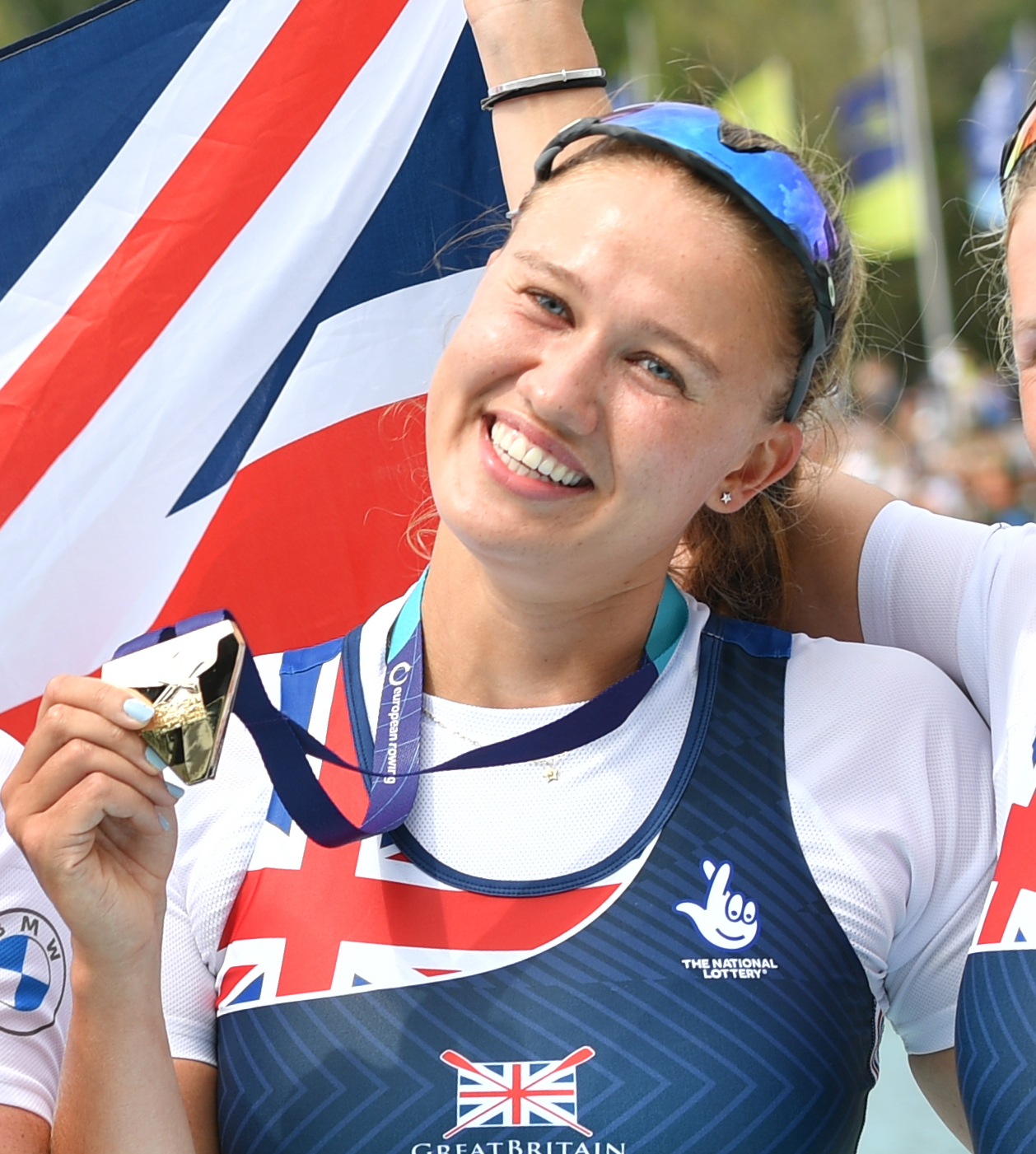
- Anderson at the 2022 European Championships

Personal information
- Born: 16 April 1998 (age 28)
- Home town: Richmond-upon-Thames

Sport
- Country: Great Britain
- Sport: Rowing
Medal record
Women's rowing
Representing Great Britain
Olympic Games
Gold medal – first place	2024 Paris	Quadruple sculls
World Championships
Gold medal – first place	2023 Belgrade	Quadruple sculls
Silver medal – second place	2025 Shanghai	Quadruple sculls
Silver medal – second place	2026 Amsterdam	Quadruple sculls
Bronze medal – third place	2022 Račice	Quadruple sculls
European Championships
Gold medal – first place	2022 Oberschleißheim	Quadruple sculls
Gold medal – first place	2024 Szeged	Quadruple sculls
Gold medal – first place	2025 Plovdiv	Quadruple sculls

Lola Anderson (born 16 April 1998) is a world champion and Olympic gold medal-winning British rower. She was inspired to take up the sport as a teenager while watching Great Britain win four rowing golds at the 2012 London Summer Olympics, encouraged by her father, Don, a former university rower.

== Early life and education ==
Anderson is from Richmond, Greater London and attended Surbiton High School. She graduated with a degree in English literature from Newcastle University.

== Career ==
Anderson won a gold medal in the quadruple sculls at the 2022 European Rowing Championships. This was followed by a bronze medal at the 2022 World Rowing Championships.

In 2022, Anderson won the Princess Royal Challenge Cup (the premier women's singles sculls event) at the Henley Royal Regatta, rowing for the Leander Club.

At the 2023 World Rowing Championships in Belgrade, she won the World Championship gold medal in the Quadruple sculls with Lauren Henry, Hannah Scott and Georgina Brayshaw.

She won a gold medal in the quadruple sculls at the 2024 Paris Summer Olympics.

== Awards ==
She was awarded an MBE in the 2025 New Year Honours for services to rowing.
