= Biblical authority =

Ideas in Christianity

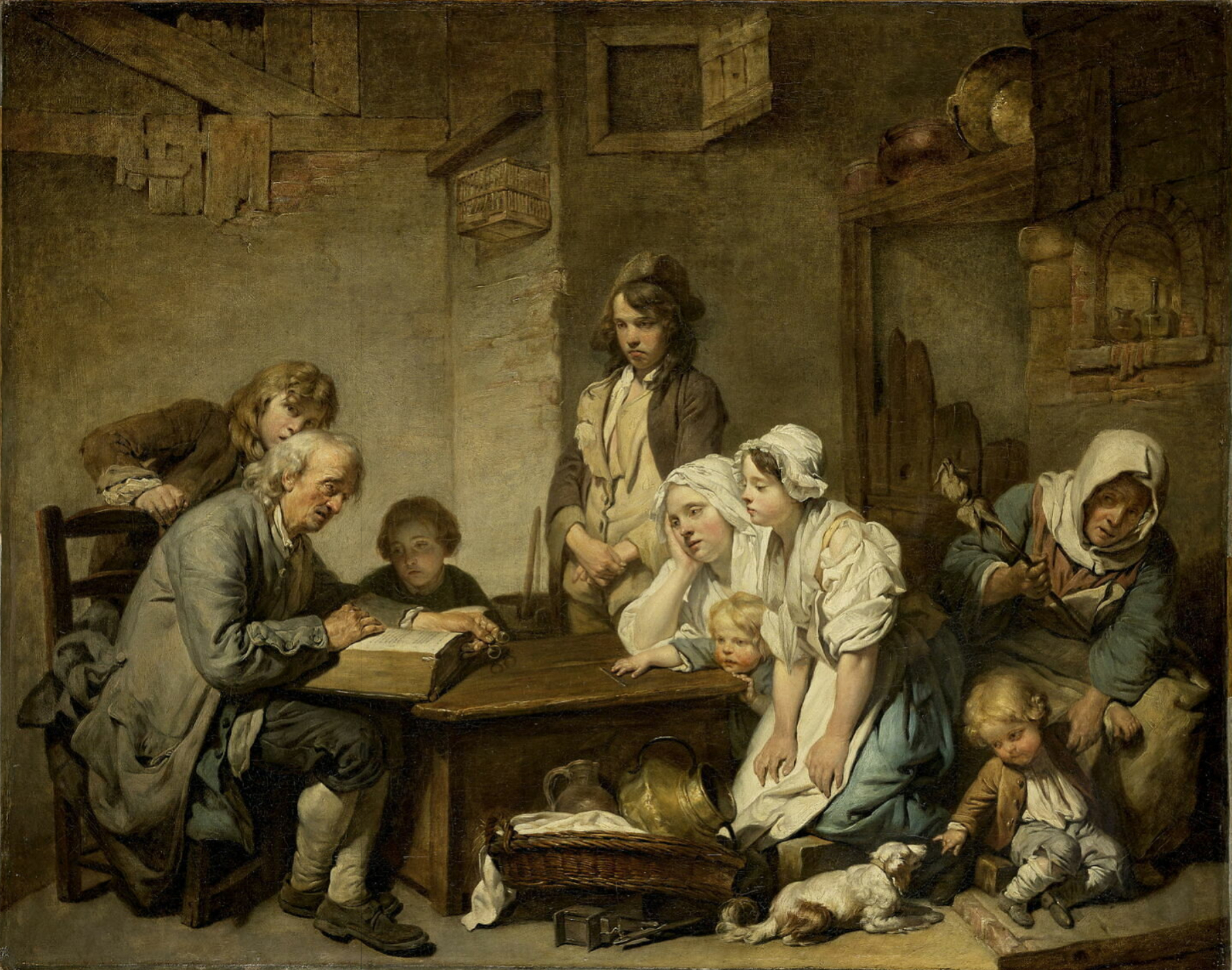
Reading the Bible, Jean-Baptiste Greuze, 1755

In Christianity, the term biblical authority refers to two complementary ideas:

- the extent to which one can regard the commandments and doctrines within the Old and New Testament scriptures as authoritative over humans' belief and conduct;
- the extent to which biblical propositions are accurate in matters of history and science.

The case for biblical authority stems from the claim that God has revealed himself in written form through human authors and that the information contained in canonical books is not of human origin. It entails, but is not exhausted by, questions raised by biblical inerrancy, biblical infallibility, biblical interpretation, biblical criticism, and biblical law in Christianity.

While there are many factions within Christianity as a religion, they commonly define the Bible as the word of authority as a direct communication of the word of God. Different Christian denominations have differing interpretations of the meaning of the words within the Bible and therefore diverge in religious practice. Different denominations include different books in their biblical canons (and a few additional volumes beyond the Bible), and some grant higher authority to specific versions.

In modern Christian research, academics have challenged certain beliefs about biblical authority and the Bible as an exact replica of the word of God. Significant perspectives suggest that the standards of accuracy most likely differ between ancient times and now, which must be considered when interpreting the Bible.

== Nature and significance ==
Biblical authority refers to the notion that the Bible is authoritative and useful in guiding matters of Christian practice because it represents the word of God. The nature of biblical authority is that it involves critique of the Bible and sources of biblical literature in order to determine the accuracy and authority of its information in regards to communicating the word of God. It examines biblical literature in order to guide practice. Biblical authority can be determined through the processes of critical interpretation, known as exegesis, as well as hermeneutics, which refers to the science of interpretive principles. Differing interpretations of biblical authority by factions of Christianity has led to divergent practices. For example, in the Reformed tradition (especially in presuppositionalism) Scripture is regarded as self-authenticating, and does not require any further confirmation of its divinely authoritative nature other than the interior and subjective witness of the Spirit in a believer. Since "the natural man receiveth not the things of the Spirit of God" (1 Corinthians 2:14), the witness of the Spirit is necessary to confirm the truth of Scripture in the heart of man, as in the case of Lydia of Thyatira, "whose heart the Lord opened, that she attended unto the things which were spoken of Paul." (Acts 16:14). John Calvin in his Institutes of the Christian Religion (1.8.13), says that 'it is foolish to attempt to prove to infidels that the Scripture is the Word of God. This it cannot be known to be, except by faith'. Nevertheless, God is said to provide additional proofs, such as Scriptural prophecy, to further confirm the faith of believers and refute the objections of unbelievers.

Modern biblical research suggests that sources of biblical authority differ between the Old and New Testaments. This is based on the notion that the Old Testament of the Bible was collated over time via several authors, and thus may not be an objective source of authority. Additionally, research explores the idea that the New Testament of the Bible is a recording of oral teachings of Jesus, which means that there is a degree of flexibility in the interpretation of biblical literature. Individual denominations of Christianity have differing takes on these theories of biblical authority.

Biblical inerrancy is a common feature across interpretations of biblical authority in Christianity. It is a modern principle that the Bible is the final authority on interpretations of the word of God, and it consists of no errors or faults.

== Old Testament ==
The Old Testament of the Bible is believed to reveal the existence of divine power through human authors in Christian religion. The Old Testament is considered canon, which is utilised in Christianity to represent a standard of faith. It was first made use of in reference to the authoritative nature of sacred scripture. Authority in the Old Testament is sourced from the combination of doctrines, commandments and stories, as these are seen as the direct words of God. Further research suggests that traditionally, authority from the Old Testament is understood through authors of the books, who are figures such as Moses. This research proposes that biblical authority in the Old Testament is dictated by the authority figure who authored the book, as opposed to the direct word of God. This is because God is seen as the "divine author of Holy Scripture". Biblical scholars have suggested that the Old Testament was written over a three-stage development of canonisation and was not completed until the sixth century AD, which differs from other accounts stating that the Old Testament was written at different times between around 1200–165 BC. This understanding of authorship in ancient Israel contributes to the interpretation of authority as it indicates that the final words of the written Old Testament may not be literally taken from the authority figure whose words are recorded in the book.

=== Judaism ===
Judaism is based on aspects of the Old Testament of the Bible, with the Torah deriving from books of the Law. The writings of the Old Testament preserved Jewish tradition over events of persecution, capture and diaspora. In Judaism, biblical authority is derived from the Old Testament and relevant books. There are varying levels of literalness based on differing factions of Judaism. The Reform Jewish faction of Judaism follow the belief that the morals and interpretations dictated by the Bible and other sacred Jewish texts may be disregarded as they are irrelevant in modern times. The Orthodox Judaism faction believe that the principles should be maintained as they are relevant in modern times. A concept within Judaism that bears relevance to biblical authority in Christianity is Rabbinic authority, meaning that the word of God is the final authority and that the word of Rabbis is derivative of this.

== New Testament ==
The teachings of Jesus existed only in oral tradition for many years before they were written down, introducing the possibility that they changed over time, especially given that this was long before modern academic standards for the reliability of printed history. Christians disagreed over which books and letters should be included as scripture. The most commonly accepted set of New Testament books in Pauline Christianity claim to be historical accounts of the lives of Jesus (including direct teachings) and the Apostles (known as the gospels and the Acts of the Apostles. Others in this set are letters circulated among early Christian churches, and the Book of Revelation is largely an apocalyptic prophecy. Various denominations have different biblical canons and some have additional volumes beyond the Bible (such as the standard works of the Church of Jesus Christ of Latter-day Saints). Some books are grouped as apocrypha which may or may not be printed in the Bible, depending on the denomination, including competing gospels.

New Testament books were written in ancient languages and hand-copied for centuries, and the original manuscripts have been lost. Textual variants in the New Testament manuscripts that survive show how the copied words changed slightly over time. Scholars believe some verses were added later, and are thus often not included in modern English translations.

Christianity arose in a Jewish society, and spread to non-Jewish cultures. Christian views on the Old Covenant - to what degree the Law of Moses in the Old Testament still has authority - differ by denomination.

Many denominations have some concept of biblical inerrancy. A strong version of this doctrine is Biblical literalism, the idea that every word in the Bible is literally true. Conservative evangelicals and fundamentalists reject such divergence and errancy, appealing to providential preservation and God's truthfulness. Other denominations believe that while there are contradictions and errors in biblical manuscripts, important theological truths have been preserved, and can be correctly interpreted by authoritative leaders in modern times, all with the help of a Holy Spirit.

In the New Testament of Pauline Christianity, the Second Epistle to Timothy (which is of disputed authorship) says: "All Scripture is breathed out by God and profitable for teaching, for reproof, for correction, and for training in righteousness".

== Criticism ==
There are several criticisms of current sources of biblical authority within scholarly research. The first criticism is put forth by Paul J. Achtemeier in 1983. This criticism outlines two potential issues within the Bible. The first is intrinsic, meaning that there are actual errors in science, history and morality within the Bible. Achtemeier provides the example of Jesus' birthdate as an instance of an inaccuracy of history within the Bible. The second issue is extrinsic, in that the Bible can be used to hold one type of Christianity over others. Achtemeier says that these issues in combination cause issues in deriving biblical authority from Christian literature.

Alternatively, in their 2013 review, Walton and Sandy raised the argument that due to the oral nature of Jesus’ stories in the New Testament, it cannot be assumed that every word should be taken literally. This perspective critiques the principle of biblical inerrancy within the concept of biblical authority.

A further perspective of the Bible as a sacred text that holds authority is that there is little understanding of the process of canonisation. There is a large time gap between when original works in the Bible appear to have been written and the original relics that have been found of the writing, giving time for change between the original written word and what was canonised within the Bible. In some instances, the reported time over which a certain work was edited and changed, whether inadvertently or intentionally, was around one thousand years. There are several ways in which the original words of the Bible could have been changed in the years of canonisation. One of which is aural conditioning, meaning that similar sounds may have been misconstrued for other sounds, ultimately altering words that were recorded. There was the potential for visual confusion and mistakes, as graphics written in certain language versions of the Bible have similar characters that could be mistaken. Visual problems might include:

- Dittography: duplication of certain letters or words,
- Haplography: omission of certain letters or words, or
- Homoeoteleuton: omission of superseding words from phrases with identical endings.

During the late 1970s and early 1980s, a debate over biblical authority arose between Jack B. Rogers and Donald K. McKim, on the one hand, and John D. Woodbridge, on the other. Rogers and McKim, in their 1979 book, The Authority and Interpretation of the Bible: An Historical Approach, advanced the view that the Bible has authority over social endeavours (issuing imperatives for human conduct, for church organization, and for articles of faith) but isn't necessarily reliable in its reportage of historical events and scientific facts. The belief that scripture is "inerrant" in matters of history and science, argued Rogers and McKim, constituted a 19th-century innovation. Woodbridge challenged this thesis in his 1982 book Biblical Authority: A Critique of the Rogers/McKim Proposal, arguing that for each of those categories, scripture has authority and is without error. Moreover, Woodbridge portrays this particular view of biblical authority as the normative, orthodox Christian position throughout the history of Christianity.

== Practical interpretations ==
=== Protestantism ===
Interpretations of biblical authority differ between Christian denominations. In several Protestant factions (namely the Lutheran and the Calvinist traditions), the doctrine of sola scriptura ("by scripture alone") guides biblical authority. Sola scriptura outlines that the Bible is the sole source of authority. Protestantism has split into several factions since separating from the Roman Catholic Church. Each faction has unique interpretations of the Bible, but utilise the same biblical authority standard of sola scriptura. The term is attributed most often to Martin Luther, who was a leader during the Protestant Reformation, creating the Church that originally separated from the existing Catholic Church. Martin Luther's ideas of sola scriptura and biblical authority descend from St Augustine, who believed in biblical truth and guided critics in understanding and overcoming discrepancies within the sacred text.

Sola scriptura may be contrasted with prima scriptura (taught by the Methodist tradition), which holds that, besides canonical scripture, there can be other guides for what a believer should believe and how they should live.

=== Roman Catholicism ===
While maintaining the same notion that the Bible has final authority on the word of God, Catholicism utilises the additional concept of magisterium, meaning that the Roman Catholic Church has teaching authority utilising the words of the Bible. This means that priests and religious officials have religious authority in interpreting the word of God and informing their followers of this interpretation.

== See also ==
- Biblical inspiration – Doctrine in Christian theology
- Clarity of scripture – Protestant Christian doctrine
