= John D. Woodbridge =

American historian (born 1941)

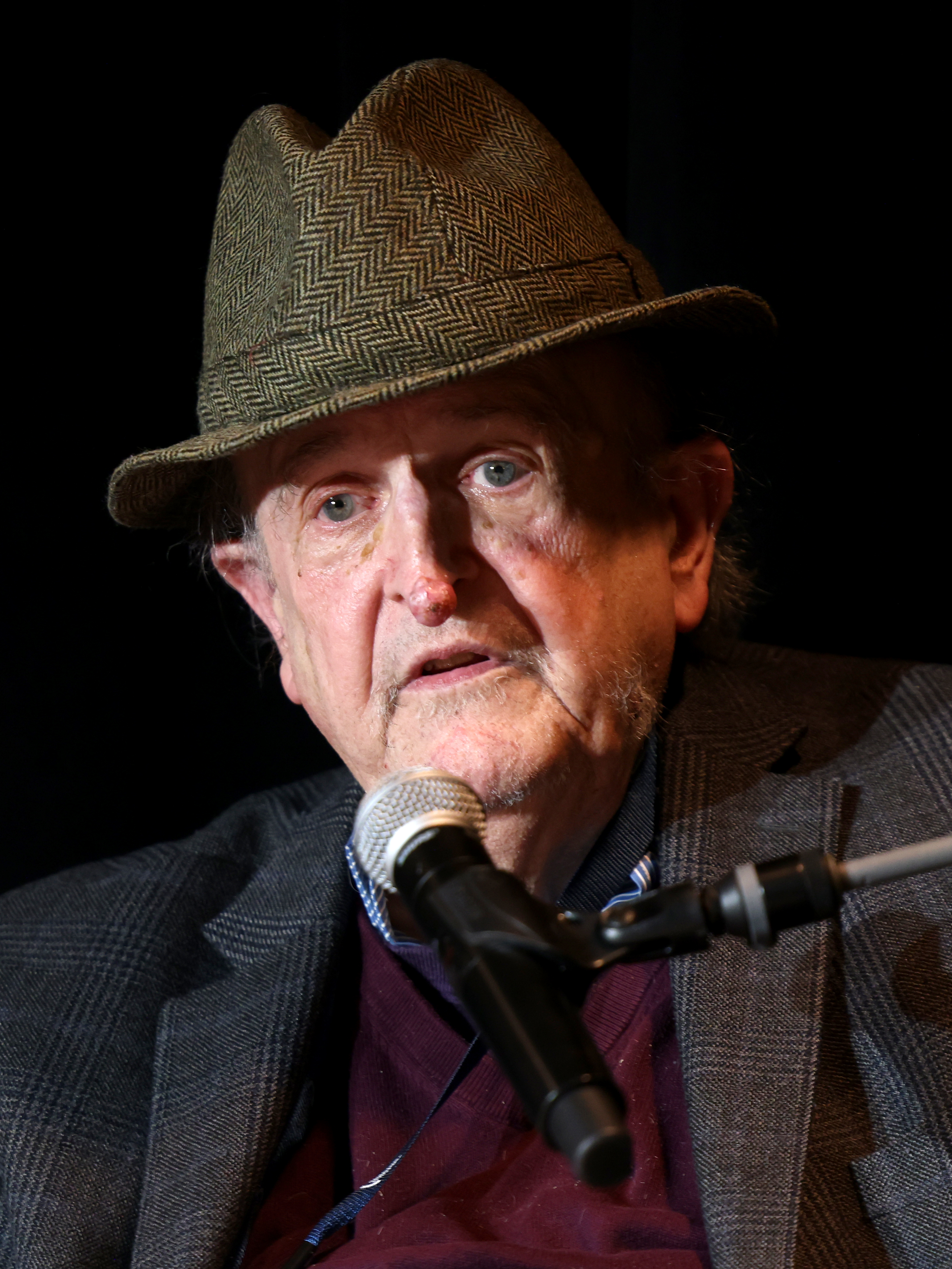
- Woodbridge in 2026
- Born: John Dunning Woodbridge; 1941 (age 84–85)
- Parent(s): Ruth and Charles Woodbridge

Academic background
- Education: Wheaton College (B.A.); Michigan State University (M.A.); Trinity Evangelical Divinity School (M.Div); Université de Toulouse (Doctorate)
- Thesis: L'influence des philosophes français sur les pasteurs réformés du Languedoc pendant la deuxième moitié du XVIIIe siècle (1969)
- Doctoral advisor: Jacques Godechot

Academic work
- Discipline: Church History
- Sub-discipline: evangelicalism, fundamentalism, the history of the Bible's authority, the French enlightenment and religion, the French Huguenots, and the origins of higher criticism.

John D. Woodbridge (born 1941) is an American church historian, professor, editor, and composer. He is Research Professor of Church History and Christian Thought at Trinity Evangelical Divinity School in Deerfield, Illinois.

== Career ==
He joined the faculty of Trinity Evangelical Divinity School in the department of church history in 1970 and became full professor in 1974. He was Visiting Professor of History at Northwestern University in Evanston, Illinois from 1989–1995. From 1997 to 1999 he served as a senior editor at Christianity Today. Among the books which he has either authored or edited, four have won a Gold Medallion Book Award. He appeared on The John Ankerberg Show in the 1980s. He is a member of the American Catholic Historical Association and the American Society of Church History. In 2017, he was awarded an honorary Doctor of Theology from Colorado Christian University.

=== Views on inerrancy ===
In 1982, he played a critical role in refuting a thesis advanced by Jack Rogers and Donald McKim which argued that the doctrine of biblical inerrancy was a recent development, developed by the Old Princetonians and particularly B. B. Warfield. According to Clark Pinnock, the Rogers-McKim proposal argued, "that the historic doctrine of inspiration was the affirmation of the infallibility of the Bible in matters of faith and practice with the possibility of errors appearing in the nonessential marginal material." Scriptural inerrantists perceived the Rogers-McKim proposal as an attack on the doctrine of biblical inerrancy and a debate continued for several years following the 1979 publication of Rogers' and McKim's book The Authority and Inspiration of the Bible. Professor Woodbridge replied with the publication of a book in 1982 titled Biblical Authority : A Critique of the Rogers/McKim Proposal. John C. Whitcomb summarized it thus, "The superficial scholarship displayed in this work has been carefully exposed by such theologians as John D. Woodbridge." John M. Frame declared, "In this lecture I will not be discussing this issue, however, because I believe that the thesis that inerrancy is recent was thoroughly demolished by John D. Woodbridge in his book Biblical Authority: A Critique of the Rogers/McKim Proposal." Other less theologically conservative scholars were mixed. Clark Pinnock, for example, described Woodbridge's work as an "erudite refutation," and that it "dealt a deadly blow". But while acknowledging that Woodbridge was historically correct in asserting the long tradition of inerrancy down to the ancient church, he expressed skepticism, concluding, "There is no proof here that [Woodbridge] understands the Bible better or better prepares us to face the modern issues."

== Music ==
Among his other interests are music, especially piano, for which he has composed music. His best known work is the song "Sans Vous (Without You)" composed in 1965. It was the basis for a lawsuit in 1983 when it was allegedly plagiarized and used as the theme song for the made-for-television film adaptation of Herman Wouk's The Winds of War. The case was heard in federal district court by Judge David Vreeland Kenyon and initially resulted in a jury verdict in favor of Dr. Woodbridge in June 1991, although Judge Kenyon later reversed the decision on a technicality. The case was settled out of court in May 1992.

== Select works ==
=== Books ===
- Woodbridge, John D.; Noll, Mark A.; Hatch, Nathan O. (1979). The Gospel in America: Themes in the Story of America's Evangelicals. Grand Rapids, MI.: Zondervan. ISBN 9780310372400. OCLC 04037003.
- ——— (1982). Biblical Authority: A Critique of the Rogers/McKim Proposal. Grand Rapids, MI.: Zondervan. ISBN 9780310447511. OCLC 08495075.
- ———; Carson, D. A. (1993). Letters along the Way: A Novel of the Christian Life. Wheaton, Il.: Crossway Books. ISBN 9780891076735. OCLC 27034503.
- ——— (1995). Revolt in Prerevolutionary France : The Prince de Conti's Conspiracy Against Louis XV, 1755-1757. Baltimore: Johns Hopkins University Press. ISBN 9780801849459. OCLC 30593892.
- ———; George, Timothy (2005). The Mark of Jesus: Loving in a Way the World Can See. Chicago: Moody Publishers. ISBN 9780802481238. OCLC 57392698.
- ———; Ferguson, Everett; James, Frank A. (2005). Church History: The Rise and Growth of the Church in its Cultural, Intellectual, and Political Context. Grand Rapids, MI.: Zondervan. ISBN 9780310205807. OCLC 56490864.
- ———; Hansen, Collin (2010). A God-Sized Vision: Revival Stories that Stretch and Stir. Grand Rapids, MI.: Zondervan. ISBN 9780310327035. OCLC 555622602.
- ———; Possley, Maurice (2011). Hitler in the Crosshairs. Grand Rapids, MI.: Zondervan. ISBN 9780310325871. OCLC 555625132.
- ———; Gustafson, David M.; Manetsch, Scott M.; Gundlach, Bradley J. (2022). Great is Thy Faithfulness: The Trinity Story, 125 Years of Trinity International University. Bellingham: Lexham Press. ISBN 9781683596325. OCLC 1311464826.

=== As editor ===
- ———; Wells, David F., eds. (1977). The Evangelicals: What They Believe, Who They Are, Where They Are Changing. Grand Rapids, MI.: Baker Book House. ISBN 9780801095436. OCLC 03293820.
- ———, ed. (1985). Renewing Your Mind in a Secular World. Chicago, Il.: Moody Press. ISBN 9780802403841. OCLC 12106989.
- ———, ed. (1988). Great Leaders of the Christian Church. Chicago, Il.: Moody Press. ISBN 9780802490513. OCLC 17327533.
- ———; McComiskey, Thomas Edward, eds. (1991). Doing Theology in Today's World : Essays in Honor of Kenneth S. Kantzer. Grand Rapids, MI.: Zondervan. ISBN 9780310447306. OCLC 23766034.
- ———; Carson, D. A., eds. (1992). Scripture and Truth. Grand Rapids, MI.: Baker Book House. ISBN 9781441206312. OCLC 818883302.
- ———, ed. (1992). More Than Conquerors. Chicago: Moody Press. ISBN 9780802490544. OCLC 25631189.
- ———, ed. (1993). God and Culture: Essays in Honor of Carl F.H. Henry. Grand Rapids, MI.: Eerdmans. ISBN 9780802837097. OCLC 26975659.
- ———; Carson, D. A., eds. (1994). Ambassadors for Christ. Chicago: Moody Press. ISBN 9780802409393. OCLC 30777023.
- ———; Carson, D. A., eds. (1995). Hermeneutics, Authority, and Canon. Carlisle, UK: Paternoster Press. ISBN 9780801020506. OCLC 32312885.
- ———; Davidson, Ivor J.; Wright, David F., eds. (2005). The Birth of the Church: From Jesus to Constantine, AD 30-312. Oxford: Monarch Books. ISBN 9780857213846. OCLC 859537653.
- ———, ed. (2019). Sketches of Faith: An Introduction to Characters from Christian History. Leyland, England: 10Publishing. ISBN 9781912373796. OCLC 1236365510.

=== Articles and chapters ===
- ——— (1973). "An 'Unnatural Alliance' for Religious Toleration: The Philosophes and the Outlawed Pastors of the 'Church of the Desert'". Church History. 42 (4): 505–523. doi:10.2307/3164970. JSTOR 3164970.
- ——— (1975). "Columba". In Towns, Elmer L. (ed.). A History of Religious Educators. Grand Rapids: Baker Book House. pp. 63–70. ISBN 9780801088292. OCLC 02224724.
- ——— (1980). "Biblical Authority: Towards an Evaluation of the Rogers and McKim Proposal". Trinity Journal. 1 (2): 165–236.
- ——— (1985). "Recent interpretations of biblical authority, pt. 1: A neoorthodox historiography under siege". Bibliotheca Sacra. 142 (565): 3–15.
- ——— (2002). "The Role of "Tradition" in the Life and Thought of Twentieth-Century Evangelicals". In Colson, Charles W.; Neuhaus, Richard John (eds.). Your Word Is Truth: A Project of Evangelicals and Catholics Together. Grand Rapids: W. B. Eerdmans. pp. 103–146. ISBN 0802805086. OCLC 50123459.
- ——— (2011). "Evangelical Self-Identity and the Doctrine of Biblical Inerrancy". In Köstenberger, Andreas J.; Yarbrough, Dennis R. (eds.). Understanding the Times : New Testament Studies in the 21st Century: Essays in Honor of D.A. Carson on the Occasion of His 65th Birthday. Wheaton, Il: Crossway. pp. 104–138. ISBN 9781433507199. OCLC 725346253.
- ——— (2012). "Foreword". In Hoffmeier, James K.; Magary, Dennis R. (eds.). Do Historical Matters Matter to Faith?: A Critical Appraisal of Modern and Postmodern Approaches to Scripture. Wheaton, Il: Crossway. pp. 63–70. ISBN 9781433525711. OCLC 730405288.
- ——— (2017). "The Fundamentalist-Modernist Controversy". In Buursma, Dirk R.; Covrett, Katya (eds.). Evangelical Scholarship, Retrospects and Prospects : Essays in Honor of Stanley N. Gundry. Grand Rapids, MI: Zondervan. ISBN 9780310087014. OCLC 1013741216.
- ——— (2018). "Timothy George and Evangelicals and Catholics Together: An Evangelical Perspective". In Dockery, David S.; Massey, James; Smith, Jr., Robert (eds.). Worship, Tradition, and Engagement: Essays in Honor of Timothy George. London: Wipf and Stock Publishers. pp. 262–275. ISBN 9781498248945.
- ——— (2023). "Biblical Authority and Faithful Christian Higher Education". Evangelical Review of Theology. 47 (3): 211–225. ISSN 0144-8153.
