= Jim West (biblical scholar) =

James E. West (born August 29, 1960) is an American biblioblogger. He is an adjunct lecturer in theology at the Ming Hua School of Theology, Hong Kong. He has been a scholar at the Quartz Hill School of Theology. He holds a Doctorate of Theology from the (unaccredited) Andersonville Theological Seminary of Camilla, Georgia. West also pastors the Petros Baptist Church in Tennessee.

== Biblioblogging ==
Jim West was one of the first people to blog about biblical studies, also known as biblioblogging, highlighting trends in biblical studies, new findings in archeology, and acting as a pundit on cultural events. He currently (from January 8, 2010) blogs at Zwinglius Redivivus. He previously blogged at Jim West (deleted December 31, 2009), and before that at Dr. Jim West (deleted February 20, 2008), and before that at First Baptist Church of Petros (deleted October 2006), and originally at Biblical Theology (deleted January 1, 2006). His blog has frequently featured as the number one biblioblog of the month according to the rankings at Free Old Testament Audio Website Blog and previously at The Biblioblog Top 50.

Jim West was a key negotiator in the decision on September 11, 2009 by the Society of Biblical Literature (SBL) to grant bibliobloggers affiliate status. He was a founding member of the steering committee responsible for reviewing proposals for biblioblogging sessions at the SBL, the first of which is at Atlanta, November 2010, although he no longer serves on that committee.

== Pastor ==
As a Baptist pastor, West has been outspoken on issues within the Baptist Church. West has rejected moves by some Baptists to observe Lent, "because for Baptists repentance can't be confined to a mere 40-day period preceded by the most intense gluttony and occupied with the setting aside of trivial pleasantries and followed by a return to the same-old, same-old". He has dismissed Nigerian Chrislam as 'the inevitable result of political correctness'.

=== Public debates ===
West is also against home schooling, having introduced a pro-public school resolution to the annual Southern Baptist Convention in 2004 and several years in a row afterward.

When the Gospel of Jesus' Wife first appeared in 2012, and before the scholarly consensus that it is a forgery developed, West said "a statement on a papyrus fragment isn't proof of anything" and "without more context, both historically and archaeologically, the snippet is valueless."

== Areas of focus ==
West is primarily concerned with studies focused on Zwingli, the Reformation, and biblical archeology.

== Works ==
West's full bibliography is listed here. Some of his books include:

- The Humor of Huldrych Zwingli: The Lighter Side of the Protestant Reformation (2007), Edwin Mellen Press; editor and translator.
- Jeremiah in History and Tradition (2020); Routledge; co-edited with Niels Peter Lemche.
- Heinrich Bullinger: An Introduction to His Life and Theology (2022), Cascade Companions; co-authored by Donald McKim.
- Finding Myth and History in the Bible • Scholarship, Scholars and Errors (2016), Equinox Publishing (Sheffield); co-editor.
- “Christ Our Captain”, An Introduction to Huldrych Zwingli (2011), Quartz Hill Publishing House.
- From Zwingli to Amyraut. Exploring the growth of European reformed traditions (2017), Vandenhoeck & Ruprecht; co-editor.
