= Jorunn =

- Pronunciation: Norwegian: [²juːrʊn] Icelandic: [ˈjouːrʏn(ː)]
- Gender: Female

Origin
- Meaning: "lover of horses" or "lover/friend of the king"
- Region of origin: Norwegian

Other names
- Related names: Jorun, Joran, Jørun

Jorunn is a feminine Norwegian given name. In Norse, "jór/iór" means "horse", and "unna" means "love". Alternatively, the first word may be derived from "jǫfurr", which means "king" or "chieftain", derived from a term that originally meant "wild boar [helmet]".

Notable people with the name include:

- Jorunn Hageler (1946–2023), Norwegian politician
- Jorunn Hareide, Norwegian historian of literature
- Jorunn Horgen (born 1966), Norwegian windsurfer
- Jorunn Johnsen (1905–1984), Norwegian journalist
- Jorunn Kjellsby (born 1944), Norwegian actress
- Jorunn Økland, Norwegian theologian
- Jorunn Ringstad (1943–2018), Norwegian politician
- Jorunn Teigen (born 1961), Norwegian orienteering competitor
- Jórunn skáldmær, Norwegian skald
- Jorunn Sundgot-Borgen (born 1961), Norwegian professor of sports medicine
- Jórunn Viðar (1918–2017), Icelandic pianist and composer
