= H.G. Stoker =

H.G. Stoker may refer to:

- Hendrik G. Stoker (1899–1993), South African Calvinist philosopher
- Henry Hugh Gordon Stoker (1885-1966), British naval officer and actor
