= Biblical inerrancy =

Belief that the Bible is without error

In Christian theology, biblical inerrancy is the belief that the Bible, in its original form, is entirely free from error.

The belief in biblical inerrancy is of particular significance within parts of evangelicalism, where it is formulated in the Chicago Statement on Biblical Inerrancy. In contrast to American evangelicalism, it has minimal influence on contemporary British evangelicalism. Some groups equate inerrancy with biblical infallibility or with the necessary clarity of scripture; others do not.

In modern Catholic teaching, it is taught that the scriptures teach "without error that truth which God wanted put into sacred writings for the sake of salvation". While some conservative theologians and Catholic apologists maintain this applies to the entirety of the Bible, Catholic scholars along with much of the Church hierarchy itself, during and after the Second Vatican Council, have taught that the Bible is only without error in either what it "intends" to affirm, or in what is important for salvation, and not necessarily in other details like history or science.

Critics argue that total biblical inerrancy conflicts with empirical science by treating ancient texts as authoritative on natural phenomena, despite contradictions with observable evidence, such as the age of the Earth or the historicity of Noah’s Ark. In contrast, many Christian scholars and the Catholic Church emphasize interpretive flexibility, viewing certain biblical accounts as allegorical or contextually framed, allowing for revision and alignment with modern knowledge while maintaining the spiritual authority of scripture.

== Terms and positions ==
Inerrancy
The word inerrancy comes from the English word inerrant, literally meaning 'not wandering', from the Latin inerrāns (parsable as in-, a negative prefix + errāns – the present participle of errāre, "to err" or "wander"). The Oxford English Dictionary defines inerrant as "That does not err; free from error; unerring."
Complete and restricted inerrancy
Some literalist or conservative Christians teach that the Bible lacks error in every way in all matters: chronology, history, biology, sociology, psychology, politics, physics, math, art, and so on. Other Christians believe that the scriptures are always right (do not err) only in fulfilling their primary purpose: revealing God, God's vision, God's purposes, and God's good news to humanity.
Inerrancy and Infallibility
Some theologians speak of the "infallibility" of the Bible. This can be understood in one of three ways.
- Some authors use "inerrancy" and "infallibility" interchangeably.
- For others, "inerrancy" refers to complete inerrancy and "infallibility" to the more limited view that the Bible is without error in conveying God's self-revelation to humanity. On this understanding, "infallibility" claims less than "inerrancy".
- Citing dictionary definitions, Frame (2002) claims "infallibility" is a stronger term than "inerrant": "'Inerrant' means there are no errors; "infallible" means there can be no errors". Yet he acknowledges that "modern theologians insist on redefining that word also, so that it actually says less than 'inerrancy.'" Harold Lindsell states: "The very nature of inspiration renders the Bible infallible, which means that it cannot deceive us. It is inerrant in that it is not false, mistaken, or defective".

=== Positions ===
- Judaism: according to H. Chaim Schimmel, Judaism had never promulgated a belief in the literal word of the Hebrew Bible, hence the co-existence of the Oral Torah. The significance of most phrases, their parts, grammar, and occasionally individual words, letters and even pronunciation in the Hebrew Bible are the subject of many rabbinic discussions in the Talmud.
- Catholic Church: the Second Vatican Council (1962–1965) authoritatively expressed the Catholic Church's view on biblical inerrancy.
  - Citing earlier declarations, it stated: "Since everything asserted by the inspired authors or sacred writers must be held to be asserted by the Holy Spirit, it follows that the books of Scripture must be acknowledged as teaching solidly, faithfully and without error that truth which God wanted put into sacred writings for the sake of salvation." But theologians disagree as to whether the words "for the sake of our salvation" in that sentence represent a shift from complete to limited inerrancy.
  - The Council did not endorse the necessary clarity of scripture: "Since God speaks in Sacred Scripture through men in human fashion, the interpreter of Sacred Scripture, in order to see clearly what God wanted to communicate to us, should carefully investigate what meaning the sacred writers really intended, and what God wanted to manifest by means of their words."
  - The Church interprets the Scripture as part of the Deposit of Faith with Sacred Tradition, and not in an apostolic vacuum: interpretations of Scripture which contradict magisterial teaching to that extent fail to capture the inerrant meaning.
- Evangelical Christianity: Evangelicals generally affirm that the Bible, and the Bible alone, is inspired by God and is the final authority on matters of faith and practice. However, there is an ongoing debate between two primary factions:
1. The inerrant view - the Bible is absolutely inerrant on all matters that it affirms.
2. The infallible but not inerrant view - while the Bible is infallible in that it does not fail believers when trusted to do what God inspired it to do, it is not absolutely inerrant in all matters it affirms, especially in some of its tangential scientific and historical statements.

== History ==
According to Coleman (1975), "[t]here have been long periods in the history of the church when biblical inerrancy has not been a critical question. It has in fact been noted that only in the last two centuries can we legitimately speak of a formal doctrine of inerrancy." The first formulations of the doctrine of inerrancy were not established according to the authority of a council, creed, or church, until the post-Reformation period.

=== Early Church ===
Origen of Alexandria thought there were minor discrepancies between the accounts of the Gospels but dismissed them due to their lack of theological importance, writing "let these four [Gospels] agree with each other concerning certain things revealed to them by the Spirit and let them disagree a little concerning other things" (Commentary on John 10.4).

Later, John Chrysostom was also unconcerned with the notion that the scriptures were in congruence with all matters of history unimportant to matters of faith:

But if there be anything touching time or places, which they have related differently, this nothing injures the truth of what they have said [...] [but those things] which constitute our life and furnish out our doctrine nowhere is any of them found to have disagreed, no not ever so little

— Homily on Matthew 1.6

John D. Woodbridge disputes this claim about Chrysostom writing, "In fact, Chrysostom apparently believed in biblical infallibility extended to every detail. He does not set forth a comprehensive discussion of the subject, but scholars who have surveyed the corpus of his work usually affirm that this is case."

In his Commentary on Galatians, Jerome also argued that Paul's rebuke of Peter in Galatians 2:11–14 for acting like a Jew around the Jewish faction of the early Church was an insincere "white lie" as Paul himself had done the same thing. In response, Augustine rebuked Jerome's interpretation and affirmed that the scriptures contained no mistakes in them, and that admitting a single mistake would shed doubt on the entire scripture:

It seems to me that the most disastrous consequences must follow upon our believing that anything false is found in the sacred books: that is to say that the men by whom the Scripture has been given to us, and committed to writing, did put down in these books anything false. [...] If you once admit into such a high sanctuary of authority one false statement [...] there will not be left a single sentence of those books which, if appearing to any one difficult in practice or hard to believe, may not by the same fatal rule be explained away, as a statement in which, intentionally, [...] the author declared what was not true

— Letters of St Augustine 28.3

For I confess to your Charity that I have learned to yield this respect and honour only to the canonical books of Scripture: of these alone do I most firmly believe that the authors were completely free from error. And if in these writings I am perplexed by anything which appears to me opposed to truth, I do not hesitate to suppose that either the manuscript is faulty, or the translator has not caught the meaning of what was said, or I myself have failed to understand it. As to all other writings, in reading them, however great the superiority of the authors to myself in sanctity and learning, I do not accept their teaching as true on the mere ground of the opinion being held by them; but only because they have succeeded in convincing my judgment of in truth either by means of these canonical writings themselves, or by arguments addressed to my reason

— Letters of St Augustine 82.3

However, John D. Hannah argues that Jerome did indeed affirm the historical nature of the Bible. For example, Jerome believed in the historicity of the book of Jonah. He further argues that while Origen resorted to allegorical interpretation, he held a high view of inerrancy.

Biblical inerrancy adherents say that the Early Church Fathers did hold to biblical inerrancy, even if it was not articulated that way. In particular, Shawn Nelson cites Clement of Rome, Papias, Ignatius of Antioch, the Shepherd of Hermas, the Didache, and the Epistle to Diognetus as examples of those whom held to inerrancy.

Clement of Rome said to his readers:

You have looked into the holy scriptures, which are true, which were given by the Holy Spirit. You know that nothing unrighteous or falsified is written in them.

— First Epistle of Clement 45:2-3

=== Medieval era ===
The medieval church fathers held to the divine origin of scripture and most believed there could not be any error in scripture as interpreted by the Church. The most prominent theologian of the Medieval era was Thomas Aquinas. Aquinas wrote:

It is heretical to say that any falsehood whatever is contained either in the Gospels or in any canonical Scripture.

— In John 13. Lect. 1

Another theologian, Hugh of St. Victor, is known for stressing the importance of the historical and literal senses of the Bible in the face of the strong allegorizing tendency of the age. He wrote:

The mystical sense is only gathered from what the letter says, in the first place. I wonder how people have the face to boast themselves teachers of allegory, when they do not know the primary meaning of the letter. "We read the Scriptures," they say, "but we don't read the letter. The letter does not interest us. We teach allegory." How do you read Scripture then, if you don't read the letter? Subtract the letter and what is left?

— De Scripturis V 5:13-15

Philosopher John Wycliff proposed an extreme version of inerrancy, that meant that even parables must have been factually true, in the book De Veritate Sacrae Scripturae (On the Truthfulness of Holy Scripture, c.1378). Wycliffe's dictum omnis veritas est ex scriptura, et ut necessarior est expressior says that all truths necessary to faith are found clearly and expressly in the Bible, and the more necessary, the more expressly. This later influenced Martin Luther.

Scholar Erasmus of Rotterdam, who published the first Latin-Greek New Testament in print, believed not only that translation between languages was always imperfect, that transmission errors had occurred by scribes, and that Scripture was sometimes deliberately obscure, but also that "the sayings of Jesus in the Synoptic Gospels (Matthew, Mark, Luke) were slightly different in each. He suggested that the Holy Spirit had not bothered to correct the faulty memories of the evangelists."

=== Reformation era ===
By the time of the Reformation, there was still no official doctrine of inerrancy. Although the term was not used, some scholars argue the Reformers did believe in the concept of inerrancy.

For Martin Luther (1483–1546), for example, "inspiration did not insure inerrancy in all details. Luther recognizes mistakes and inconsistencies in Scripture and treated them with lofty indifference because they did not touch the heart of the Gospel." When Matthew appears to confuse Jeremiah with Zechariah in Matthew 27:9, Luther wrote that "Such points do not bother me particularly." However, other Luther scholars have pointed out that Luther, in other places, said the Scripture cannot contradict itself. Luther said in regards to whether the Bible had errors or not, "the Scriptures cannot err." Other statements made by Luther seem to contradict that, e.g. he stated that he found numerous errors in the Bible, and lambasted a couple of books of the Protestant Bible as worthless; he also stated that his idea of Christ trumps the letter of the Scripture, especially when the Scripture is cited in order to give the lie to his idea.

The Christian humanist and one of the leading scholars of the Northern Renaissance, Erasmus (1466–1536), was also unconcerned with minor errors not impacting theology, and at one point, thought that Matthew mistook one word for another. In a letter to Johannes Eck, Erasmus wrote that "Nor, in my view, would the authority of the whole of Scripture be instantly imperiled, as you suggest, if an evangelist by a slip of memory did put one name for another, Isaiah for instance instead of Jeremiah, for this is not a point on which anything turns."

The same point of view held true for John Calvin (1509–1564), who wrote that "It is well known that the Evangelists were not very concerned with observing the time sequences." However, Calvin also said that Scripture is the "certain and unerring rule." Calvin scholars are divided on whether Calvin actually held to inerrancy or not. Some scholars such as Jack B. Rogers and Donald McKim said Calvin "was unconcerned with normal, human inaccuracies in minor matters" in Scripture. Other scholars such as John D. Woodbridge and J.I. Packer said Calvin did adhere to a position equivalent to biblical inerrancy.

The doctrine of inerrancy, however, began to develop as a response to these Protestant attitudes. Whereas the Council of Trent only held that the Bible's authority was "in matters of faith and morals", Jesuit cardinal Robert Bellarmine (1542–1621) argued in his 1586 De verbo Dei, the first volume of his multi-volume Disputationes de controversiis christianae fidei adversus hujus temporis haereticos that "There can be no error in Scripture, whether it deals with faith or whether it deals with morals/mores, or whether it states something general and common to the whole Church, or something particular and pertaining to only one person." Bellarmine's views were extremely important in his condemnation of Galileo and in Catholic–Protestant debate, as the Protestant response was to also affirm his heightened understanding of inerrancy.

=== Post-Reformation ===
In the 17th century, Quaker apologist Robert Barclay took a step away from Biblical Inerrancy while continuing to affirm Biblical inspiration and the Bible's place in Christian doctrine. Barclay said that "errors [in the Bible] may be supposed by the injury of the times to have slipped in", but that because of inspiration from the Holy Spirit, all necessities remained.

During the 18th and 19th centuries and in the aftermath of the Enlightenment critique of religion, various episodes of the Bible (for example the Noahide worldwide flood, the creation in six days, and the creation of women from a man's rib) began increasingly to be seen as legendary rather than as literally true. This led to further questioning of the veracity of biblical texts.

== Modern Protestant discussion ==
The Fuller Theological Seminary formally adopted inerrancy restricted to theological matters (what some authors now call "infallibility"). It explained:

Where inerrancy refers to what the Holy Spirit is saying to the churches through the biblical writers, we support its use. Where the focus switches to an undue emphasis on matters like chronological details, precise sequence of events, and numerical allusions, we would consider the term misleading and inappropriate.

A more comprehensive position was espoused particularly in the magazine Christianity Today and the book entitled The Battle for the Bible by Harold Lindsell. Lindsell asserted that losing the doctrine of the inerrancy of scripture was the thread that would unravel the church and conservative Christians rallied behind this idea.

=== Arguments in favour of inerrancy ===
Norman Geisler and William Nix (1986) write that scriptural inerrancy is typically argued by a number of observations and processes, which include:

- The alleged historical accuracy of the Bible
- The Bible's alleged claims of its own inerrancy
- General church history and tradition
- One's individual experience with God

Daniel B. Wallace, Professor of New Testament at Dallas Theological Seminary, divides the various evidences into two approaches: deductive and inductive approaches.

==== Deductive justifications ====
The first deductive justification is that the Bible says it is inspired by God (for instance "All Scripture is God-breathed and is useful for teaching, rebuking, correcting, and training in righteousness", 2 Timothy 3:16) and because God is perfect, the Bible must also be perfect and, hence, free from error. For instance, the statement of faith of the Evangelical Theological Society says, "The Bible alone, and the Bible in its entirety, is the Word of God written and is therefore inerrant in the autographs".

Supportive of this is the idea that God cannot lie. W. J. Mcrea writes:

The Bible then makes two basic claims: it asserts unequivocally that God cannot lie and that the Bible is the Word of God. It is primarily from a combination of these facts that the argument for inerrancy comes.

Stanley Grenz states that:

Because God cannot lie and because scripture is inspired by God, the Bible must be wholly true. This syllogism may be valid for establishing inerrancy, but it cannot define the concept.

Also, from Geisler:

Those who defend inerrancy are deductivists pure and simple. They begin with certain assumptions about God and the scriptures, namely, that God cannot lie and the scriptures are the Word of God. From these assumptions, inerrantists deduce that the Bible is without error.

A second reason offered is that Jesus and the apostles used the Old Testament in a way that assumes it is inerrant. For instance, in Galatians 3:16, Paul bases his argument on the fact that the word "seed" in the Genesis reference to "Abraham and his seed" is singular rather than plural. This (as stated) sets a precedent for inerrant interpretation down to the individual letters of the words.

Now the promises were spoken to Abraham and to his seed. He does not say, "And to seeds", as (referring) to many, but (rather) to one, "And to your seed", that is, Christ.

— Galatians 3:16

Similarly, Jesus said that every minute detail of the Old Testament Law must be fulfilled, indicating (it is stated) that every detail must be correct:

For verily I say unto you, Till heaven and earth pass, one jot or one tittle shall in no wise pass from the law, till all be fulfilled.

— Matthew 5:18 KJV

Although in these verses, Jesus and the apostles are only referring to the Old Testament, the argument is considered by some to extend to the New Testament writings, because 2 Peter 3:16 accords the status of scripture to New Testament writings also: "He (Paul) writes the same way in all his letters ... which ignorant and unstable people distort, as they do the other scriptures".

==== Inductive justifications ====
Wallace describes the inductive approach by enlisting the Presbyterian theologian Benjamin Breckinridge Warfield:

In his Inspiration and Authority of the Bible, Warfield lays out an argument for inerrancy that has been virtually ignored by today's evangelicals. Essentially, he makes a case for inerrancy on the basis of inductive evidence, rather than deductive reasoning. Most evangelicals today follow E. J. Young's deductive approach toward bibliology, forgetting the great articulator of inerrancy. But Warfield starts with the evidence that the Bible is a historical document, rather than with the presupposition that it is inspired.

===== Inspiration =====
In the Nicene Creed, Christians confess their belief that the Holy Spirit "has spoken through the prophets". This creed has been normative for Roman Catholics, Eastern Orthodox, Anglicans, Lutherans and all mainline Protestant denominations except for those descended from the non-credal Stone-Campbell movement. As stated by Alister E. McGrath, "An important element in any discussion of the manner in which scripture is inspired, and the significance which is attached to this, is 2 Timothy 3:16–17, which speaks of scripture as 'God-breathed' (theopneustos)". According to McGrath, "the reformers did not see the issue of inspiration as linked with the absolute historical reliability or factual inerrancy of the biblical texts". He says, "The development of ideas of 'biblical infallibility' or 'inerrancy' within Protestantism can be traced to the United States in the middle of the nineteenth century".

People who believe in total inerrancy think that the Bible does not merely contain the Word of God, but every word of it is, because of verbal inspiration, the direct, immediate word of God. The Lutheran Apology of the Augsburg Confession identifies Holy Scripture with the Word of God and calls the Holy Spirit the author of the Bible. Because of this, Lutherans confess in the Formula of Concord, "we receive and embrace with our whole heart the prophetic and apostolic Scriptures of the Old and New Testaments as the pure, clear fountain of Israel". Lutherans (and other Protestants) believe apocryphal books are neither inspired nor written by prophets, and that they contain errors and were never included in the "Palestinian Canon" that Jesus and the Apostles are said to have used, and therefore are not a part of Holy Scripture. The prophetic and apostolic scriptures are authentic as written by the prophets and apostles. A correct translation of their writings is God's Word because it has the same meaning as the original Hebrew and Greek. A mistranslation is not God's word, and no human authority can invest it with divine authority.

However, the 19th-century Anglican biblical scholar S. R. Driver held a contrary view, saying that, "as inspiration does not suppress the individuality of the biblical writers, so it does not altogether neutralise their human infirmities or confer upon them immunity from error". Similarly, J. K. Mozley, an early 20th-century Anglican theologian has argued:

That the Bible is inspired is, indeed, a primary Christian conviction; it is from this that certain consequences have been drawn, such as infallibility and inerrancy, which retain their place in Christian thought because they are held to be bound up with the affirmation of inspiration. But the deductions can be rejected without any ambiguity as to the fact of inspiration. Neither 'fundamentalists' nor sceptics are to be followed at this point... the Bible is inspired because it is the adequate and indispensable vehicle of revelation; but inspiration does not amount to dictation by God.

===== Divine authority =====
For a believer in total (or "plenary") biblical inerrancy, Holy Scripture is the Word of God, and carries the full authority of God. Every single statement of the Bible calls for instant and unqualified acceptance. Every doctrine of the Bible is the teaching of God and therefore requires full agreement. Every promise of the Bible calls for unshakable trust in its fulfillment. Every command of the Bible is the directive of God himself and therefore demands willing observance.

===== Sufficiency =====
According to some believers, the Bible contains everything that they need to know to obtain salvation and live a Christian life, and there are no deficiencies in scripture that need to be filled with tradition, pronouncements of the Pope, new revelations, or present-day development of doctrine.

==== Clarifications ====
===== Accuracy vs. truth =====
Harold Lindsell points out that it is a "gross distortion" to state that people who believe in inerrancy suppose every statement made in the Bible is true (as opposed to accurate). He says there are expressly false statements in the Bible, but they are reported accurately. He notes that "All the Bible does, for example in the case of Satan, is to report what Satan actually said. Whether what he said was true or false is another matter. Christ stated that the devil is a liar".

===== Inerrancy vs. infallibility =====
Many who believe in the inspiration of scripture teach that it is infallible but not inerrant. Those who subscribe to infallibility believe that what the scriptures say regarding matters of faith and Christian practice are wholly useful and true. Some denominations that teach infallibility hold that the historical or scientific details, which may be irrelevant to matters of faith and Christian practice, may contain errors. Those who believe in total or plenary inerrancy hold that the scientific, geographic, and historic details of the scriptural texts in their original manuscripts are completely true and without error, though the scientific claims of scripture must be interpreted in the light of its phenomenological nature, not just with strict, clinical literality, which was foreign to historical narratives.

===== Metaphor and literalism =====
Even if the Bible is inerrant, it may need to be interpreted to distinguish between what statements are metaphorical, and which are literally true. Jeffrey Russell writes that "Metaphor is a valid way to interpret reality. The 'literal' meaning of words – which I call the overt reading – is insufficient for understanding reality because it never exhausts reality." He adds:

Originating in Evangelicalism, the Fundamentalists affirmed that the Bible is to be read "literally" or overtly, leading some to reject not only physicalist evolution but even evolution science and to deny that life developed over billions of years. Evangelicals tended to believe in the "inerrancy" of the Bible (though they defined that term variously), a view that sometimes could unhelpfully turn the Bible into an authority on science and history.

Figures such as Scot McKnight have also argued that the Bible clearly transcends multiple genres and Hebrew prose poems cannot be evaluated by a reader the same as a science textbook.

=== Criticism ===
==== Theological criticism ====
Proponents of Biblical inerrancy often cite 2 Timothy 3:16 as evidence that scripture is inerrant. For this argument, they prefer translations that render the verse as "All scripture is given by inspiration of God," and they interpret this to mean that the whole Bible must therefore be in some way inerrant. However, critics of this doctrine think that the Bible makes no direct claim to be inerrant or infallible. C. H. Dodd argues the same sentence can also be translated "Every inspired scripture is also useful", nor does the verse define the Biblical canon to which "scripture" refers. In addition, Michael T. Griffith, the Mormon apologist, writes:

Nowhere within its pages does the Bible teach or logically imply the doctrine of scriptural inerrancy. [Concerning] 2 Timothy 3:16 [...] this passage merely says that "all scripture" is profitable for doctrine, reproof, etc. It says nothing about scripture being "perfect", or "inerrant", or "infallible", or "all-sufficient". If anything, Paul's words constitute a refutation of the idea of scriptural inerrancy [...] What it does say is that scripture is useful, profitable, for the needs of the pastoral ministry. The only "holy scriptures" Timothy could have known from childhood were the Hebrew scriptures, the Old Testament. And yet, would any Christian assert that in Paul's view the Old Testament was the final and complete word of God to man? Of course not. In any event, verse 15 makes it clear that in speaking of "all scripture" Paul was referring to the Jewish scriptures and perhaps to some of his own epistles. The New Testament as we know it simply did not exist yet. Furthermore, it is fairly certain that Paul's canon included some Jewish scriptures no longer found in the Old Testament, such as the book of Enoch.

The Catholic New Jerusalem Bible also has a note that this passage refers only to the Old Testament writings understood to be scripture at the time it was written. Furthermore, the Catholic Veritas Bible website says that "Rather than characterizing the Old Testament scriptures as required reading, Paul is simply promoting them as something useful or advantageous to learn. [...] it falls far short of a salvational requirement or theological system. Moreover, the four purposes (to teach, correct, etc.) for which scripture is declared to be 'profitable' are solely the functions of the ministry. After all, Paul is addressing one of his new bishops (the 'man of God'). Not a word addresses the use of scripture by the laity." Another note in the Bible suggests that there are indications that Paul's writings were being considered, at least by the author of the Second Epistle of Peter, as comparable to the Old Testament.

The view that total Biblical inerrancy can be justified by an appeal to prooftexts that refer to its divine inspiration has been criticized as circular reasoning, because these statements are only considered to be true if the Bible is already thought to be inerrant.

In the introduction to his book Credible Christianity, Anglican Bishop Hugh Montefiore, comments:

The doctrine of biblical inerrancy seems inherently improbable, for two reasons. Firstly, the Scriptures contain what seem to be evident errors and contradictions (although great ingenuity has been applied to explain these away). Secondly, the books of the Old and New Testaments did not gain their place within the "canon", or list of approved books, as soon as they were written. The Old Testament canon was not closed until late in the Apostolic age, and the New Testament canon was not finally closed until the fourth century. If all the Bible's contents were inerrant, one would have thought that this would have become apparent within a much shorter period.

===== Liberal Christianity =====
In general, liberal Christianity has no problem with the thought that the Bible has errors and contradictions. Liberal Christians reject the dogma of inerrancy or infallibility of the Bible, which they see as the idolatry (fetishism) of the Bible. Martin Luther emphatically declared: "if our opponents allege Scripture against Christ, we allege Christ against Scripture."

William John Lyons quoted William Wrede and Hermann Gunkel, who affirmed: "Like every other real science, New Testament Theology has its goal simply in itself, and is totally indifferent to all dogma and Systematic Theology [...] the spirit of historical investigation has now taken the place of a traditional doctrine of inspiration".

John Shelby Spong, author and former bishop of the Episcopal Church who was well-known for his post-theistic theology, declared that the literal interpretation of the Bible is heresy.

===== Meaning of "Word of God" =====
Much debate over the kind of authority that should be accorded biblical texts centers on what is meant by the "Word of God". The term can refer to Christ himself as well as to the proclamation of his ministry as kerygma. However, total biblical inerrancy differs from this orthodoxy in viewing the Word of God to mean the entire text of the Bible when interpreted didactically as God's teaching. The idea of the Bible itself as the Word of God, as being itself God's revelation, is criticized in neo-orthodoxy. Here the Bible is seen as a unique witness to the people and deeds that do make up the Word of God. However, it is a wholly human witness. All books of the Bible were written by human beings. Thus, whether the Bible is—in whole or in part—the Word of God is not clear. However, some argue that the Bible can still be construed as the "Word of God" in the sense that these authors' statements may have been representative of, and perhaps even directly influenced by, God's own knowledge.

There is only one instance in the Bible where the phrase "the Word of God" refers to something written. The reference is to the Decalogue. However, most other references are to reported speech preserved in the Bible. The New Testament also contains a number of statements that refer to passages from the Old Testament as God's words, for instance Romans 3:2, d (which says that the Jews have been "entrusted with the very words of God"), or the book of Hebrews, which often prefaces Old Testament quotations with words such as "God says". The Bible also contains words spoken by human beings about God, such as Eliphaz (Job 42:7) and the prayers and songs of the Psalter. That these are God's words addressed to humanity was at the root of a lively medieval controversy. The idea of the word of God is more that God is encountered in scripture, than that every line of scripture is a statement made by God.

While the phrase "the Word of God" is never applied to the modern Bible within the Bible itself, supporters of total inerrancy argue that this is because the Biblical canon was not closed. In 1 Thessalonians 2:23 the apostle Paul wrote to the church in Thessalonica, "When you received the word of God which you heard from us, you welcomed it not as the word of men, but as it is in truth, the word of God."

==== Translation ====
Translation has given rise to a number of issues, as the original languages are often quite different in grammar as well as word meaning. For readability, clarity, or other reasons, translators may choose different wording or sentence structure, and some translations may choose to paraphrase passages. Because some of the words in the original language have ambiguous or difficult-to-translate meanings, debates over the correct interpretation occur. Some believers trust their own translation to be the accurate one. One such group of believers is known as the King James Only movement.

=== Autographic texts and modern versions ===
Those who hold the total inerrancy of the Bible have a variety of views as to whether inerrancy refers to modern Bibles or only to the original, autographic texts. There are also disagreements about whether, because the autographic texts no longer survive, modern texts can be said to be inerrant. Article X of the Chicago statement agrees that the inspiration for the words of the Bible can only strictly be applied to the autographs. However, the same article asserts that the original text "can be ascertained from available manuscripts with great accuracy", so that the lack of the originals does not affect the claim of biblical inerrancy of such recovered, modern texts. Robert Saucy, for instance, reports that writers have argued that "99 percent of the original words in the New Testament are recoverable with a high degree of certainty."

For the Catholic church, the Latin Vulgate translation has been declared "authentic", meaning that where the Latin Vulgate diverges from the original languages, for example by translator or scribal error, it is either not significant for faith or morals or is true in its own right.

==== Textual tradition of the New Testament ====
Most of these manuscripts date to the Middle Ages. The oldest complete copy of the New Testament, the Codex Sinaiticus, which includes two other books (the Epistle of Barnabas and The Shepherd of Hermas) not now included in the accepted NT canon, dates to the 4th century. The earliest fragment of a New Testament book is the Rylands Library Papyrus P52 which dates from 125–175 AD, recent research pointing to a date nearer to 200 AD.

The average NT manuscript is about 200 pages, and in all, there are about 1.3 million pages of text. No two manuscripts are identical, except in the smallest fragments, and the many manuscripts that preserve New Testament texts differ among themselves in many respects, with some estimates of 200,000 to 300,000 differences among the various manuscripts. According to Bart Ehrman:

Most changes are careless errors that are easily recognized and corrected. Christian scribes often made mistakes simply because they were tired or inattentive or, sometimes, inept. Indeed, the single most common mistake in our manuscripts involves "orthography", significant for little more than showing that scribes in antiquity could spell no better than most of us can today. In addition, we have numerous manuscripts in which scribes have left out entire words, verses, or even pages of a book, presumably by accident. Sometimes scribes rearranged the words on the page, for example, by leaving out a word and then reinserting it later in the sentence.

In the 2008 Greer-Heard debate series, New Testament scholars Bart Ehrman and Daniel B. Wallace discussed these variances in detail. Wallace mentioned that understanding the meaning of the number of variances is not as simple as looking at the number of variances, but one must consider also the number of manuscripts, the types of errors, and among the more serious discrepancies, what impact they do or do not have.

For hundreds of years, Biblical and textual scholars have examined the manuscripts extensively. Since the eighteenth century, they have employed the techniques of textual criticism to reconstruct how the extant manuscripts of the New Testament texts might have descended, and to recover earlier recensions of the texts. However, King James Version (KJV)-only inerrantists often prefer the traditional texts (i.e., Textus Receptus, which is the basis of KJV) used in their churches to modern attempts of reconstruction (i.e., Nestle-Aland Greek Text, which is the basis of modern translations), arguing that the Holy Spirit is just as active in the preservation of the scriptures as in their creation.

KJV-only inerrantist Jack Moorman says that at least 356 doctrinal passages are affected by the differences between the Textus Receptus and the Nestle-Aland Greek Text.

Some modern Bibles have footnotes to indicate areas where there is disagreement between source documents. Bible commentaries offer discussions of these.

==== Inerrantist response ====
Evangelical Christians generally accept the findings of textual criticism, and nearly all modern translations, including the New Testament of the New International Version, are based on "the widely accepted principles of [...] textual criticism".

Since textual criticism suggests that the manuscript copies are not perfect, strict inerrancy is only applied to the original autographs (the manuscripts written by the original authors) rather than the copies. However total inerrantists usually claim that imperfect manuscripts have a negligible effect on our ability to know what the autographs said. For example, evangelical theologian Wayne Grudem writes:

For most practical purposes, then, the current published scholarly texts of the Hebrew Old Testament and Greek New Testament are the same as the original manuscripts. Thus, when we say that the original manuscripts were inerrant, we are also implying that over 99 percent of the words in our present manuscripts are also inerrant, for they are exact copies of the originals.

The "Chicago Statement on Biblical Inerrancy" says, "We affirm that inspiration, strictly speaking, applies only to the autographic text of Scripture". However, it also reads: "We deny that any essential element of the Christian faith is affected by the absence of the autographs. We further deny that this absence renders the assertion of biblical inerrancy invalid or irrelevant."

Less commonly, more conservative views are held by some groups.

===== Textus Receptus =====
A minority of total biblical inerrantists go further than the Chicago Statement, arguing that the original text has been perfectly preserved and passed down through time. This is sometimes called "Textus Receptus Onlyism", as it is believed the Greek text by this name (Latin for received text) is a perfect and inspired copy of the original and supersedes earlier manuscript copies. This position is based on the idea that only the original language God spoke in is inspired, and that God was pleased to preserve that text throughout history by the hands of various scribes and copyists. Thus the Textus Receptus acts as the inerrant source text for translations to modern languages. For example, in Spanish-speaking cultures the commonly accepted "KJV-equivalent" is the Reina-Valera 1909 revision (with different groups accepting, in addition to the 1909 or in its place, the revisions of 1862 or 1960). The New King James Version was also translated from the Textus Receptus.

===== King James Only inerrantists =====
A faction of those in the "King James Only movement" rejects the whole discipline of textual criticism and holds that the translators of the King James Version English Bible were guided by God and that the KJV thus is to be taken as the authoritative English Bible. One of its most vocal, prominent and thorough proponents was Peter Ruckman.

===== Michael Licona =====
In 2010, Michael Licona published a book defending the resurrection of Jesus called, The Resurrection of Jesus: A New Historiographical Approach. In one part of the book, Licona raised questions about the literal interpretation of the resurrection of the saints in Matthew 27:51-53. He suggests the passage of scripture is an apocalyptic genre. Scholars such as Norman Geisler accused Licona of denying the full inerrancy of the Bible in general and the Gospel narratives in particular. As a result, Licona resigned from his position as research professor of New Testament at Southern Evangelical Seminary and apologetics coordinator for the North American Mission Board.

== Modern Catholic discussion ==
=== Before Vatican II ===
St. John Henry Newman, writing in 1884, acknowledged the "human side" of biblical inspiration which "manifests itself in language, style, tone of thought, character, intellectual peculiarities, and such infirmities, not sinful, as belong to our nature, and which in unimportant matters may issue in what in doctrinal definitions is called an obiter dictum (said in passing)." In this view, the Bible contains many statements of a historical nature that have no salvific content in themselves and so need not be inerrant. Often called the "absent father of Vatican II" (absent because he died 72 years before it began), the wording of Dei Verbum recalls Newman’s position. The theologians who wrote it knew and positively appreciated his views.

In 1907, Pope Pius X condemned historical criticism in the 1907 Lamentibili sane exitu. However, around the time of the mid-twentieth century, attitudes changed. In 1943, Pope Pius XII issued the encyclical Divino afflante Spiritu, making historical criticism not only permissible but "a duty". Catholic biblical scholar Raymond E. Brown described this encyclical as a "Magna Carta for biblical progress".

=== Vatican II ===
From the onset of the Second Vatican Council in 1962, the council's document on revelation went through several stages of revision, with statements on disputed subjects reflecting what Raymond Brown described as careful compromise. The first draft schema on the Sources of Revelation included "inerrancy" within one chapter heading but this word was dropped in later drafts in favour of the term "without error", used with specific reference to the truth necessary for salvation. Cardinal Koenig, who attended the council, pointed out errors in the biblical books, calling them “deficient in accuracy as regards both historical and scientific matters”. On 18 November 1965 the Vatican II Council adopted the Dogmatic Constitution on Divine Revelation, known as Dei verbum from its first Latin words. The document's teaching on inerrancy is found in a single sentence:

11. [...] Since therefore all that the inspired authors or sacred writers affirm should be regarded as affirmed by the Holy Spirit, we must acknowledge that the books of Scripture firmly, faithfully, and without error teach that truth which God, for the sake of our salvation, wished to see confided to the Sacred Scriptures.

In a speech to German bishops during the council, Joseph Ratzinger (the future Pope Benedict XVI) described inerrancy as referring to everything which scripture intended to affirm, but not necessarily in how it is expressed, saying:

It is not surprising that according to a practically irrefutable consensus of historians there definitely are mistakes and errors in the Bible in profane matters of no relevance for what Scripture properly intends to affirm.

And that:

Scripture is and remains inerrant and beyond doubt in everything that it properly intends to affirm, but this is not necessarily so in that which accompanies the affirmation and is not part of it. As a result, [...] the inerrancy of Scripture has to be limited to its vere enunciata [what is really affirmed].

Since Vatican II, there has been no official pronouncement on the meaning of this phrase. Article 107 of the Catechism of the Catholic Church (1992) simply quotes the sentence from Dei verbum without any further explanation:

107. The inspired books teach the truth. "Since therefore all that the inspired authors or sacred writers affirm should be regarded as affirmed by the Holy Spirit, we must acknowledge that the books of Scripture firmly, faithfully, and without error teach that truth which God, for the sake of our salvation, wished to see confided to the Sacred Scriptures." (DV 11)

=== Present-day Catholic teaching ===
Some theologians and apologists defend the view that total inerrancy is still the Church's teaching. For instance, articles defending this position can be found in the 2011 collection For the Sake of Our Salvation. On a more popular level, the apologetic website Catholic Answers hosts several articles defending the same position. Yet, Catholic Answers also hosts articles that advance the view that inerrancy applies only to that which the author aimed to assert as true, and consequently some matters of history or science may contain error.

Many Catholic scholars do not adopt the view of total inerrancy. For instance, Raymond E. Brown, "perhaps the foremost English-speaking Catholic Biblical scholar", writes:

On inerrancy Vatican II made an important qualification as our italics indicate: "The Books of Scripture must be acknowledged as teaching firmly, faithfully, and without error that truth which God wanted put into the sacred writings for the sake of our salvation." Some have tried to interpret the italicized phrase to cover everything the human author expressed, but pre-voting debates show an awareness of errors in the Bible. [...] Thus, it is proper to take the clause as specifying: Scriptural teaching is truth without error to the extent that it conforms to the salvific purpose of God.

And also:

In the last hundred years we have moved from an understanding wherein inspiration guaranteed that the Bible was totally inerrant to an understanding wherein inerrancy is limited to the Bible's teaching of "that truth which God wanted put into the sacred writings for the sake of our salvation." In this long journey of thought the concept of inerrancy was not rejected but was seriously modified to fit the evidence of biblical criticism which showed that the Bible was not inerrant in questions of science, of history, and even of time-conditioned religious beliefs.

Similarly, Scripture scholar R. A. F. MacKenzie, in his commentary on Dei verbum, said:

The Bible was not written in order to teach the natural sciences, nor to give information on merely political history. It treats of these (and all other subjects) only insofar as they are involved in matters concerning salvation. It is only in this respect that the veracity of God and the inerrancy of the inspired writers are engaged.

Also commenting on Dei Verbum, specifically paragraph 11 discussing Scripture's protection from error, Ronald D. Witherup, a Sulpician priest and biblical scholar, gives the following explanation:

This affirmation of Dei Verbum, then, is more nuanced than some might think. This is not a blanket approval of literal inerrancy but acknowledgement of the lack of errors regarding the essentials for salvation. From a modern perspective, it is well known that the Bible contains some scientific and historical errors, but none of these endanger the faith of delimit the truth of the Scriptures. The fact is that God, as the ultimate author of Scripture, had to rely on the human authors.... None of this in any way dilutes the truth of God's word.

Cardinal Ratzinger, later Pope Benedict XVI, according to scholar Matthew Ramage, also argued that inerrancy is best understood with respect to the totality of Scripture. In 2002, Cardinal Ratzinger wrote:

It follows straightaway that neither the criterion of inspiration nor that of infallibility can be applied mechanically. It is quite impossible to pick out one single sentence and say, right, you find this sentence in God's great book, so it must simply be true in itself

These views are shared by many Church officials and as a result are taken for granted in some Church documents. For instance:

- An official report (1999) on theological conversations between the US Conference of Catholic Bishops and the Southern Baptist Convention, to be found on the website of the US Conference of Catholic Bishops:
  For Roman Catholics, inerrancy is understood as a consequence of biblical inspiration; it has to do more with the truth of the Bible as a whole than with any theory of verbal inerrancy. Vatican II says that "the books of Scripture must be acknowledged as teaching firmly, faithfully, and without error that truth which God wanted put into the sacred writings for the sake of our salvation" (Dei verbum 11). What is important is the qualification of "that truth" with "for the sake of our salvation."
- A 2005 "teaching document" issued by the Bishops' Conferences of England and Wales, and of Scotland, entitled The Gift of Scripture:
  14. [...] The books thus declared canonical and inspired by the Spirit of God contain 'the truth which God wished to be set down in the sacred writings for the sake of our salvation' (Dei verbum 11). It is important to note this teaching of the Second Vatican Council that the truth of Scripture is to be found in all that is written down 'for the sake of our salvation'. We should not expect total accuracy from the Bible in other, secular matters. We should not expect to find in Scripture full scientific accuracy or complete historical precision.
- The instrumentum laboris (working paper) for the 2008 Synod of Bishops on the Word of God:
  15. [...] even though all parts of Sacred Scripture are divinely inspired, inerrancy applies only to 'that truth which God wanted put into sacred writings for the sake of salvation" (DV 11). (Note: The English translation on the Vatican website has been corrected here to bring it in line with the official Latin text: "quamvis omnes Sacrae Scripturae partes divinitus inspiratae sint, tamen eius inerrantia pertinet tantummodo ad «veritatem, quam Deus nostrae salutis causa Litteris Sacris consignari voluit» (DV 11)")

In light of the history of papal documents and the answer of Dei Verbum to the questions relating to scripture, the New Jerome Biblical Commentary notes that "decrees of the ecumenical councils are more binding than papal encyclicals" and that "all these documents, conciliar, papal, and curial, must be evaluated in the light of the time in which they were issued and the problems to which they were addressed. A fundamentalism in interpreting them is just as objectionable as a fundamentalism in interpreting Scripture".

== Criticism and scope of inerrancy ==
=== Empirical evidence and testability ===
Critics argue that total biblical inerrancy undermines the empirical basis of science by treating ancient religious texts as authoritative on natural phenomena, even when these texts conflict with observable evidence. For example, a literal reading of the creation narrative in Genesis, which suggests a young Earth created in six days (Genesis 1:1–31), is inconsistent with the scientific consensus on the age of the Earth (approximately 4.54 billion years) and the process of evolution through natural selection. These discrepancies have led scholars like Richard Dawkins to criticize biblical inerrancy as being "indifferent to the evidence".

Many secular scholars highlight apparent scientific and historical inaccuracies in the Bible as evidence against its inerrancy. For instance, the story of Noah's Ark (Genesis 6:9–9:17), when taken literally, describes a global flood, which lacks geological evidence and contradicts known principles of hydrology and biology. The lack of supporting evidence for other events described as historical in the Bible, such as the Exodus, further calls into question the claim of total inerrancy.

However, biblical inerrancy is not synonymous with biblical literalism, and Christians often focus more on what is intended to be written by a biblical author than the veracity of what is actually written. Pope John Paul II wrote to the Pontifical Academy of Sciences on the subject of cosmology and how to interpret Genesis, describing it as teaching God as the author of all creation in a way expressed within the context of knowledge contemporary to the ancient author:

Cosmogony and cosmology have always aroused great interest among peoples and religions. The Bible itself speaks to us of the origin of the universe and its make-up, not in order to provide us with a scientific treatise, but in order to state the correct relationships of man with God and with the universe. Sacred Scripture wishes simply to declare that the world was created by God, and in order to teach this truth it expresses itself in the terms of the cosmology in use at the time of the writer. The Sacred Book likewise wishes to tell men that the world was not created as the seat of the gods, as was taught by other cosmogonies and cosmologies, but was rather created for the service of man and the glory of God. Any other teaching about the origin and make-up of the universe is alien to the intentions of the Bible, which does not wish to teach how heaven was made but how one goes to heaven.

Catholic priest and philosopher of science Stanley Jaki blamed the Protestant Reformation for biblical literalism, which resulted in the Bible being construed as a literal source of scientific knowledge:

Insofar as the study of the original languages of the Bible was severed from authoritative ecclesiastical preaching as its matrix, it fueled literalism... Biblical literalism taken for a source of scientific information is making the rounds even nowadays among creationists who would merit Julian Huxley's description of 'bibliolaters.' They merely bring discredit to the Bible as they pile grist upon grist on the mills of latter-day Huxleys, such as Hoyle, Sagan, Gould, and others. The fallacies of creationism go deeper than fallacious reasonings about scientific data. Where creationism is fundamentally at fault is its resting its case on a theological faultline: the biblicism constructed by the [Protestant] Reformers.

As for specific events in the Bible, particularly in the Old Testament, Christians and scholars alike tend to view certain sections as either allegorical, or as stories based on past events but embellished with hyperbolic and figurative language, such as with Genesis, Exodus, and Joshua.

=== Resistance to revision ===
Another point of contention is the resistance of biblical inerrancy to revision, which is at odds with the self-correcting nature of the idealized scientific process. While science progresses through the refinement of theories based on new evidence, total biblical inerrancy maintains that the (original) text is immutable, preventing reinterpretation in light of new discoveries. Philosopher Daniel Dennett has criticized this rigidity, suggesting that it hampers intellectual progress and fosters dogmatism.

The Catholic Church has embraced divergent interpretations of different books in the Bible in light of modern discoveries, while maintaining the inerrancy of scripture, insofar as such interpretations don't diverge from Catholic teaching. In 1943, Pope Pius XII issued the encyclical Divino afflante Spiritu, making historical criticism not only permissible but "a duty" for the study of scripture, while today there exists learned groups such as the Catholic Biblical Association dedicated to the academic study of the Bible. As far back as late antiquity, Saint Augustine of Hippo taught that Christians should change their minds when interpretating scripture (in his case, Genesis) in light of any new knowledge.

== See also ==
- An Historical Account of Two Notable Corruptions of Scripture
- Biblical hermeneutics
- Bibliolatry
- Christ myth theory
- Divine providence
- Historical criticism
- John Calvin's view of Scripture
- Joseph Smith Translation of the Bible
- Quranic inerrancy
- Quranic literalism
- Religious skepticism
- Urtext (biblical studies)
