= Benjamin Myers =

Australian theologian (born 1978)

Benjamin Myers (born 14 May 1978) is an Australian theologian at Alphacrucis University College, and a research fellow of the Centre for Centre for Religion, Ethics and Society (CRES) at Charles Sturt University. From 2009 to 2017 Myers was a lecturer at United Theological College within the School of Theology of Charles Sturt University. Prior to taking up a post at CSU, Myers was a researcher at the University of Queensland's Centre for the History of European Discourses. He has also been a member of Princeton's Center of Theological Inquiry and a visiting scholar at Fuller Theological Seminary.

Myers specializes in systematic theology, English literature and modern Anglican thought. He has published a major book on John Milton's theology, as well as numerous articles on Karl Barth, Rudolf Bultmann, Sarah Coakley, Benedict XVI and other modern theologians. His book on the thought of the previous Archbishop of Canterbury, Rowan Williams, was named one of the best books of 2012 in The Guardian and The Christian Century. His book on the Apostles' Creed was an ECPA Book Award Finalist and a SparkLit Christian Book of the Year Award Finalist in 2019.

Myers is also widely known for being a pioneer in the Biblioblog movement. His blog, Faith & Theology, was one of the original theology blogs and attracted a wide international audience for many years. A selection of writing from the blog was published as a book in 2013. Myers is an occasional contributor to ABC Radio National and ABC Religion and Ethics. He has also published a children's book on the Apostles' Creed with illustrator Natasha Kennedy.

Myers currently resides in Brisbane.

== Works ==
=== Books ===
- Milton's Theology of Freedom Berlin: Walter De Gruyter, 2006. ISBN 978-3-11-018938-4
- Christ the Stranger: The Theology of Rowan Williams New York: T&T Clark, 2012. ISBN 978-0-567-59971-1
- Salvation in My Pocket: Fragments of Faith and Theology Eugene, OR: Cascade Books, 2013. ISBN 978-1-60899-757-2
- The Apostles’ Creed: A Guide to the Ancient Catechism Bellingham, WA: Lexham Press, 2018 ISBN 978-1-68359-088-0
- (with Natasha Kennedy) The Apostles' Creed: For All God's Children Bellingham, WA: Lexham Press, 2022 ISBN 1683595742

=== Selected articles ===
- "Predestination and Freedom in Milton’s Paradise Lost," in Scottish Journal of Theology 59:1 (2006), 64-80.
- "Prevenient Grace and Conversion in Paradise Lost," in Milton Quarterly 40:1 (2006), 22-39.
- "The Difference Totality Makes: Reconsidering Pannenberg’s Eschatological Ontology," in Neue Zeitschrift für systematische Theologie und Religionsphilosophie 49:2 (2007), 141-55.
- "Karl Barth as Historian: Historical Method in the Göttingen Lectures on Calvin, Zwingli and Schleiermacher," in Zeitschrift für dialektische Theologie 23:1 (2007), 96-109.
- "'Following the Way Which Is Called Heresy': Milton and the Heretical Imperative," in Journal of the History of Ideas 69:3 (2008), 375-93
- "Faith as Self-Understanding: Towards a Post-Barthian Appreciation of Rudolf Bultmann," in International Journal of Systematic Theology 10:1 (2008), 21-35.
- "The Stratification of Knowledge in the Thought of T. F. Torrance," in Scottish Journal of Theology 61:1 (2008), 1-15.
- "Does Theology Belong in the University? Schleiermacherian Reflections from an Australian Context," in International Journal of Public Theology 15:4 (2021), 484-495.
- "Affliction and Resignation in George Herbert: Reflections on Human Agency in a Global Pandemic," in New Blackfriars 103:1103 (2022), 113-127.

=== Chapters in edited volumes ===
- "Disruptive History: Rowan Williams on Heresy and Orthodoxy," in On Rowan Williams: Critical Essays, ed. Matheson Russell (Eugene, OR: Cascade, 2009), 47-67. ISBN 978-1-55635-973-6
- "From Faithfulness to Faith in the Theology of Karl Barth," in The Faith of Jesus Christ: Exegetical, Biblical, and Theological Studies, ed. Michael F. Bird and Preston M. Sprinkle (Carlisle: Paternoster, 2009), 291-308. ISBN 978-1-59856-429-7
- "A Tale of Two Gardens: Augustine’s Narrative Interpretation of Romans 5," in Apocalpytic Paul: Cosmos and Anthropos in Romans 5-8 (Waco: Baylor University Press, 2013), 39-58.
- "The Patristic Atonement Model," in Locating Atonement: Explorations in Constructive Dogmatics (Grand Rapids: Zondervan, 2015), 71-88.
- "‘Truth, Not Custom’: Joseph Ratzinger on Faith and Reason," in The Theology of Benedict XVI: A Protestant Appreciation, ed. Tim Perry (Bellingham: Lexham Press, 2019).
