= Jorun =

- Gender: Female

Origin
- Meaning: "lover of horses" or "lover/friend of the king"
- Region of origin: Norwegian

Other names
- Related names: Jorunn, Joran, Jørun

Jorun is a Norwegian feminine given name and a version of Jorunn. People with the name include:

- Jørun Drevland (born 1944), Norwegian politician
- Jorun Erdal (born 1963), Norwegian singer and musical theatre artist
- Jorun Marie Kvernberg (born 1979), Norwegian musician
- Jorun Solheim (born 1944), Norwegian social anthropologist
- Jorun Stiansen (born 1984), Norwegian pop singer
- Jorun Askersrud Tangen (1929–2012), Norwegian skier
- Jorun Thørring (born 1955), Norwegian writer
