= Conrad J. Wethmar =

South African theologian

Conrad Johannes Wethmar
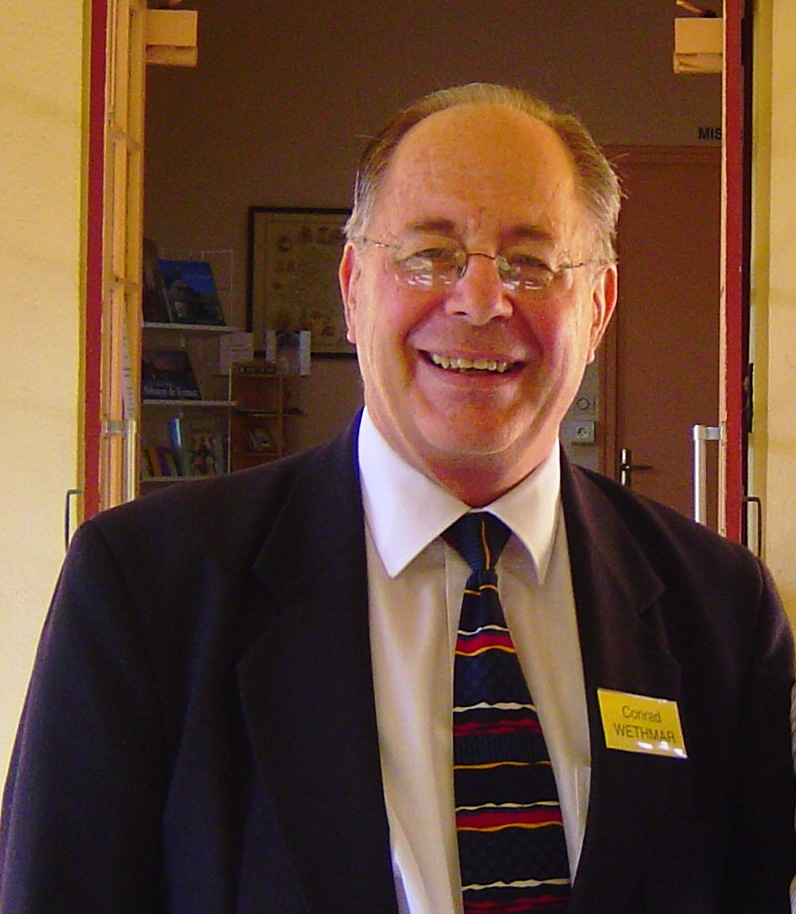
- Conrad J. Wethmar in 2009
- Education: M.Div. Th.D. (1977)
- Alma mater: Free University, Amsterdam
- Occupations: Professor, University of Pretoria

Conrad Johannes Wethmar (born 25 May 1943) is a systematic theologian, reformed theologian and emeritus professor at the University of Pretoria in South Africa. He is guest editor of Verbum et Ecclesia.

== Biography ==
He was born in Florida, Gauteng, west of Johannesburg, South Africa. He finished B.A.(Greek, Hebrew, and philosophy) at the Stellenbosch University in 1964, received B.A. in Greek in 1966, B.A. in philosophy in 1968, B.Th. in 1968, M.A.(Greek) in 1969, and Licentiate in Theology in 1969. Studying at Stellenbosch University he was influenced by Johan Heyns. In order to study Systematic Theology, he went to Netherlands in 1970 and received Doctoraal Examen Theologie in 1972 and Th. D. under Dr. Gerrit Cornelis Berkouwer at the Free University, Amsterdam in 1977. He was a professor at the University of Durban Westvill from 1977 to 1980. He served as an ordained minister of the Reformed Church in Africa from 1977 to 1980.

From 1981 to 2008, he taught systematic theology at the University of Pretoria. He served as dean of the department of theology. He became an Emeritus professor of Dogmatics and Christian Ethics in the University of Pretoria. He is an extraordinary professor of Reformed Theology in North-West University since 2013. He has contributed to christology and ecclesiology as well as systematic theology (doctrines). He asserts that theology exists for the church and should help the church through preaching. He trained 25 Ph.D. students.

== Experience ==
- 1977-1980:- Professor of Systematic Theology, University of Durban-Westville (Dean of The Theological Faculty: 1979–1980)
- 1977-1980:- Ordained minister of The Reformed Church in Africa
- 1981-2008:- Professor of Dogmatics and Christian Ethics, University of Pretoria (Dean of The Theological Faculty of The Dutch Reformed Church 1997–1999)
- 1981-2008:- Ordained minister of The Dutch Reformed Church (Since 2008 Emeritus)
- 2008:-- Emeritus Professor of Dogmatics and Christian Ethics, University of Pretoria
- 2013:-- Extraordinary Professor of Reformed Theology, North-West University (Potchefstroom)

== International research visits and guest lectures ==
- 1984: - Chicago and Grand Rapids
- 1987: - Frankfurt and Heidelberg
- 1988: - Harare
- 1995: - Boedapest, Amsterdam, Leiden and Utrecht
- 1998: - Singapore, Taipei en Hong Kong
- 1999: - Utrecht and Amsterdam
- 2000: - Hoeven, Utrecht, Amsterdam
- 2001: - Seoul and Pyongtek (Korea), Leuven, Amsterdam, Utrecht
- 2003: - Amsterdam
- 2005: - Seoul, Amsterdam
- 2007: - Amsterdam, Utrecht, Doorn (Hydepark)
- 2009: - Amsterdam, Utrecht, Aix en Provence

== Publications ==
1. Dogmatics as a confessional and academic discipline. Dogmatics as a confessional and academic discipline, 1992
2. Education in an Ecumenical Context", in Theology Between Church, University, and Society, ed., M. E. Brinkman, Nico F. M. Schruers, H.M. Vroon & Conrad J. Wethmar
3. Recent Ecclesiological Developments in the World Council of Churches: Continuity or Discontinuity?in Crossroad Discourses between Christianity and Culture
4. For and about Etienne de Villiers as ethicist of responsibility
5. Mite as simbool in die Platoniese dialoë. M A- Verhandeling, Stellenbosch, 1969. # Dogma en Verstaanshorison. Amsterdam : Rodopi, 1977.
6. “A classification of theological subject matter “, in : R H Venter (ed), South African Classification of Educational Subject Matter. Pretoria: Department of National Education(Universities Branch), 1978.
7. A few theological notes on ethical issues raised by genetics “, in: G C Oosthuizen, H A Shapiro, S A Strauss (eds), Genetics and society. Cape town: Oxford University Press, 1980, pp 176-181.
8. Dogma, Kerugma en Geskiedenis. Enkele voorlopige gesigspunte in verband met hulle onderlinge verhoudinge”, in: Skrif en Kerk 2/1,1981, pp 51–63.
9. Die bediening van barmhartigheid”, in: Die Kerkbode 134,1982, p 8 e.v.
10. Die kerk as draer van die Goddelike Woord”, in: Skrif en Kerk 5/2, 1984, pp 53–59.
11. Vuurdoop van vrede “, in: A Nel (red), Byderwets en Byderwoords. Roodepoort: CUM-Boeke,1984.
12. "Is Biblical truth relational as stated in God with us?”, in : P G Schrotenboer (ed), The Interpretation of Scripture Today. Grand Rapids: Reformed Ecumenical Synod, 1985, pp 2–30.
13. Kerk en Geregtigheid”, in: Skrif en Kerk 6/2, 1985, pp 180–183.
14. “Die witleuen en die noodleuen”, in: Ons Jeug 35/6, pp 124 e.v.
15. “Die Gebed. Enkele gesigspunte in verband met die aard en inhoud van die Christelike gebed met besondere verwysing na die Heidelbergse Kategismus”, in Skrif en Kerk 8/1, pp 97–112.
16. “Homologie en Hermeneutiek”, in: Hervormde Teologiese Studies 44/2,1988, pp 540–559.
17. “Godsleer en gebed. Enkele gesigspunte in verband met die Godsleer van Gerhard Ebeling”, in: C J Wethmar en CJA Vos(reds), ’ n Woord op sy tyd .’n Teologiese feesbundel aangebied aan professor Johan Heyns ter herdenking van sy sestigste verjaarsdag. Pretoria: N G Kerkboekhandel, 1988, pp217-237.
18. “Gebed en Voorsienigheid”, in: Die Fakkel, 1989.
19. “Biddag in tye van nood”, in: A C Barnard (red), Die jaar van God se genade, Pretoria : N G Kerkboekhandel, 1989, pp 167–171.
20. “Hemelvaart”, in: A C Barnard (red), Die jaar van God se genade, Pretoria: N G Kerkboekhandel, 1989, pp 71–74.
21. “Dubbele vryspraak”, Ons Jeug 38/8, 1989, pp 64 e.v.
22. “The road to Damascus:’n kerklik-teologiese perspektief “, in: Skrif en Kerk 11/1, 1990, pp 103–116.
23. “Teologie en Samelewing”, in: H M Kuitert, J veenhof, H M Vroom (reds), Cultuur als partner van de theologie. Opstellen over de relatie tussen cultuur, theologie en godsdienstwijsbegeerte, aangeboden aan Pof Dr G E Meuleman. Kampen : Kok, 1990, pp24–41.
24. “Die dogmatologiese vakke”, in: Deo Gloriablad 1990.
25. “ Dogmatologie en Bedieningsmoontlikhede”, in: Deo Gloriablad 1991.
26. Dogmatiek as konfessionele en akademiese dissipline: terugblik en vooruitskouing. Intreerede: Universiteit van Pretoria, 1992.
27. “Die ekumeniese roeping van die kerk in die lig van die Gereformeerde belydenisskrifte”, in: D Crafford en AGS Gous (reds), Een liggaam – baie lede. Die kerk se ekumeniese roeping wêreldwyd en in Suid-Afrika. Pretoria: Verba Vitae, 1993, pp 37–43.
28. “Ekumenisiteit in dogmatologiese perspektief”, in: D Crafford en AGS Gous (reds), Een liggaam – baie lede. Die kerk se ekumeniese roeping wêreldwyd en in Suid-Afrika. Pretoria: Verba Vitae, 1993, pp 44–55.
29. “Die junior vennoot in die teologiese laboratorium”, in: Deo Gloriablad 1993, pp 10–11.
30. “Die vraagstuk van die ope en geslote nagmaal in die Nederduitse Gereformeerde Kerk”, in: NGTT 34/4, 1994, pp 525–532.
31. “Die wetenskaplikheid en konfessionaliteit van die teologie : Enkele gesigspunte in verband met die teologiebegrip van J A Heyns”, in: Skrif en Kerk 15/1, 1994, pp 65–74.
32. “Die department dogmatiek en etiek in die nuwe Suid-Afrika”, in : Deo gloriablad 1994, pp 10–11.
33. “Die Vryheid van die teologie in die nuwere Rooms-Katolieke denke”, In : Skrif en Kerk 16/2, 1995, pp 401–419.
34. “Wat hou Protestante en Rooms-Katolieke uit mekaar? ’n Vraaggesprek”in: Die Kerkbode(20 Oktober 1995), p 7.
35. “Die toekoms van die dogmatiek in Suid-Afrika”, in: Deo Gloriablad, 1995, p 25.
36. “Dogmatiek en Spiritualiteit”, in : Deo Gloriablad 1996, p 11.
37. “Wat het Athene met Jerusalem te doen? Enkele histories-sistematiese gesigspunte in verband met die vraag of die teologie aan die universiteit tuishoort”, in: Skrif en Kerk 17/2, pp 473–490.
38. “Donum Veritatis and the freedom of theology. A Reformed perspective”, in: A van Egmond and D van Keulen (eds), Freedom.(Studies in Reformed Theology I), Baarn : Callenbach, 1996, pp 115–132.
39. “Ecclesiology and theological education. A South African Reformed perspective, in Skrif en Kerk 18/2, 1997, pp 415-430.
40. “Die toekoms van teologiese opleiding in die Nederduitse Gereformeerde Kerk”, in: NGTT 39/3, 1998, pp 220–230.
41. “Ecclesiology and theological education. A South African Reformed perspective,” in : A van Egmond and D van keulen (eds), Church and Ministry (Studies in Reformed Theology 3), Kampen : Kok, 1999, pp 71–89.
42. (Met G Braulik)”Does our society need the humanities? An example from theology “, in Bulletin.News for the Human Sciences 5/1, October 1998, pp 17–18.
43. “Changes and challenges in theological education: A South African perspective “, in REC Forum 27/3, 1999, pp 15–23.
44. “Theological education in an ecumenical context: principles and procedures of the Pretoria model”, in : Skrif en Kerk 21/2, 2000, pp 416–428.
45. “Kingdom and Justification. Response to the paper “Kingdom of God or justification of the sinner”by professor J van bruggen”, in: In Die Skriflig 35/2, 2001, pp 269–273.
46. “Does dogma have a future?” in: In die Skriflig 36/2, 2002, pp 281–291.
47. “Die NG Kerk en gereformeerdheid : gestalte en uitdagings”, in : Verbum et Ecclesia 23/1, 2002, pp 250–256.
48. “Theological education in an ecumenical context: principles and procedures of the Pretoria model”, in: ME Brinkman, NFM Schreurs, HM Vroom and CJ wethmar (eds), Theology between Church, University and Society. Assen : Van Gorcum, 2003, pp 61–74.
49. “Theology between church, university and society “, in : ME Brinkman, NFM Schreurs, HM Vroom and CJ Wethmar (eds), Theology between Church, University and Society. Assen : Van Gorcum, 2003, pp 217–238.
50. “Die nuwe Hervorming en die ortodoksie “, in : Verbum et Ecclesia 24/2 2003, pp 644–649.
51. (Met Brand, SJP)”Die logika van die geloof : gebed as raakpunt tussen rasionaliteit en ervaring by Rahner en Calvyn”, in NGTT 47/3en 4, 2006, 799–817.
52. “Conceptualisation of evil in African Christian theology”, in : JD Gort, H Jansen and HM Vroom (eds) Probing the depths of evil and good. Multireligious views and case studies. Amsterdam-New- York : Rodopi, 2007, pp217–234; ook in : Acta Theologica 26/1, 2006, pp 249–267.
53. “Confessionality and identity of the church : A Reformed perspective”, in: E van der Borght (ed), Christian Identity. Leiden/ Boston: Brill, 2008, pp 135–149.
54. “Seventy years dogmatics and Christian ethics at the University of Pretoria : A Dutch Reformed perspective”, In : Verbum et Ecclesia 30/3, 2009, pp 68–76.
55. “Die verhouding tussen Godsleer en ekklesiologie in die werk van Jürgen Moltmann”, in : FG Immink en CJA Vos (reds) God in een kantelende wereld. Geloof en kerk in veranderende contexten.Zoetermeer: Boekencentrum, 2009, pp 153–172.
56. “Recent ecclesiological developments in the World Council of Churches: continuity or discontinuity ?” in : JD Gort, H Jansen and W Stoker (eds), Crossroad discourses between Christianity and culture. Amsterdam- New York: Rodopi, 2010, pp 505–523.
57. “Op hierdie rots sal ek my kerk bou”, in : C Vos en D Human (reds), Vaste rots op wie ek bou. Kaapstad : Lux Verbi, 2011, pp 79–94.
58. “Maak dit saak wat ons oor die Drie-eenheid van God glo ?”, in: D Human en D Veldsman (reds), Oor jou afdrukke. Feesbundel vir Cas Vos. Pretoria: Universiteit van Pretoria, 2012, pp150–162.
59. “Ekklesiologie en Etiek : Die werk van Etienne de Villiers in die lig van die ekumeniese diskussie oor ekklesiologie en etiek”, in Verbum et Ecclesia 33/2, 2012, Art #772 [ dx.doi.org.innopac.up.ac.za/10.4102/ve.v 33i2.772 ].
60. (Met DP Veldsman) “ For and about Etienne de Villiers as ethicist of responsibility”, in Verbum et Ecclesia 33/2, 2012, Art #805 .
61. “Theology and the university: Historical and contemporary perspectives”, in : R venter and F Tolmie (eds), Transforming theological knowledge. Essays on theology and the university after apartheid, Bloemfontein : SUN Press, 2012, pp 73–82.
62. (Met D P Veldsman)”Dogmatiek en christelike Etiek(1938-1999-2013)”, in: D J Human en J M Van der Merwe(reds), Die Ned. Geref.Kerk en Teologiese opleiding aan die Universiteit van Pretoria: 1938–2013. Pretoria: Universiteit van Pretoria, 2013, pp 91–118.
63. “Die wil van God”, In F M Gaum et al. (reds), Teologiese Kern-ensiklopedie (Digitale Uitgawe),2014.
64. “Neo-Ortodoksie”, in: F M Gaum et al. (reds), Teologiese Kern-ensiklopedie (Digitale Uitgawe),2014.
65. “The origin and calling of the church: The dialogue between the Reformed and Roman Catholic Churches five hundred years after the Reformation”, In: N. Vorster and S.P. van der Walt(eds.), Reformed Theology Today: Biblical and systematic-theological perspectives, Cape Town: Aosis,2017, pp. 115–132.
66. Kan die Gereformeerdes en die Katolieke mekaar na vyf honderd jaar vind?, 2017.
67. Seventy years of dogmatics and Christian ethics at the University of Pretoria: A Dutch reformed perspective Conrad Wethmar, Verbum et Ecclesia, Vol 30, No 3

== See also ==
- Johan Heyns
- Gerrit Cornelis Berkouwer
- University of Pretoria
