= Jorunn Økland =

Norwegian gender studies expert and biblical scholar

Jorunn Økland (born 1964) is a Norwegian gender studies expert and biblical scholar with a background in Classics. She is currently Director at the Norwegian Institute at Athens (from 2016) and Professor of Gender Studies in the Humanities at the University of Oslo (from 2007), and former Director of its Centre for Gender Research (2010-2013). Her fields of expertise are Pauline Studies, ancient mediterranean material culture, feminist critique of religion, gender and sacred texts, Bible translation, and cultural/secular uses of the Bible.

In the period 2000-2009, she was Lecturer and Senior Lecturer at the Department of Biblical Studies, University of Sheffield.

She has led several research projects, was co-founder and the first managing editor of the Journal of the Bible and Its Reception (de Gruyter 2014-). She was President of the European Association of Biblical Studies (2009–12) and chair of the Council for Gender Studies in Norway (2010-2011). She has also held further positions of trust in international research associations and has since 2016 been member of Council (a board of directors) of Society of Biblical Literature. She has been a researcher at the Centre for Advanced Study at the Norwegian Academy of Science and Letters on two projects. She is also a member of the Norwegian Academy of Science and Letters.

== Selected publications ==
- with Christine Amadou: From Akershus to Acropolis: Norwegian Travelers to Greece. Athen: The Norwegian Institute at Athens, 2019.
- with Karen Wenell og Cornelis de Vos: Constructions of Space III: Biblical Spatiality and the Sacred. London: Bloomsbury, 2016
- The Letters of Paul/ "Paulus’ brev" edited and introduced, in the series Verdens Hellige Skrifter, Oslo, 2010.
- with William John Lyons: The Way the World Ends? The Apocalypse in Culture and Ideology. Sheffield Phoenix Press, 2009. ISBN 1906055432
- with Turid Karlsen Seim: Metamorphoses: Resurrection, Body and Transformative Practices in Early Christianities. Berlin: Walter de Gruyter, 2009. ISBN 978-3-11-020298-4.
- with Roland Boer: Marxist Feminist Criticism of the Bible. Sheffield Phoenix Press 2008. ISBN 1906055351.
- Women in their Place: Paul and the Corinthian Discourse of Gender and Sanctuary Space. London: Continuum, 2004. ISBN 0567084078
