= Johan Heyns =

South African theologian

The Reverend Johan Heyns
- Heyns in his study
- Born: Johan Adam Heyns; 27 May 1928; Tweeling, South Africa
- Died: 5 November 1994 (aged 66); Pretoria, South Africa
- Cause of death: Assassination
- Children: Christof Heyns

Ecclesiastical career
- Church: Dutch Reformed Church in South Africa (NGK)
- Ordained: 1954
- Offices held: Moderator of the General Assembly (1986–1990)

Academic background
- Education: Potchefstroom University for Christian Higher Education; University of Pretoria; Free University of Amsterdam
- Doctoral advisor: G. C. Berkouwer; Hendrik G. Stoker

Academic work
- Discipline: Theology
- School or tradition: Calvinism
- Institutions: Stellenbosch University; University of Pretoria
- Influenced: Conrad J. Wethmar

Johan Adam Heyns (1928–1994) was an Afrikaner Calvinist theologian and moderator of the general synod of the Nederduits Gereformeerde Kerk (NGK) in South Africa. He was assassinated at his home in Waterkloof Ridge, Pretoria.

== Early life and education ==
Heyns was born on 27 May 1928 on the farm Bloemkraal at Tweeling in the Orange Free State, South Africa.

His father, Flip Heyns, wanted to become a missionary, but could not afford to do so and became a farmer instead. His mother, Maria Beukes, was exiled to Saint Helena during the Second Boer War. Her marriage to Flip Heyns was her second. Since her first marriage did not produce any children, Maria promised God that if He would bless her with a son, she would raise him for His service. Although she did not tell Heyns about this promise until years after he had already been ordained as minister, Heyns would later admit that his mother had played a significant role in his eventual decision to become a cleric.

Being an Afrikaner was important to Heyns since his schooldays. His interests in politics started early, and he became a leader of a youth group in the Ossewabrandwag while still in primary school. (During breaks he would hold meetings and make speeches – an activity which was stopped by the school principal). Despite his father being the leader of the local branch of the National Party and Heyns' early affinity for politics, he would never formally join the ruling party. Although he maintained a strong pro-national stance, his views were tempered through his ability to maintain a unique critical perspective – an asset which would later become a hallmark of his work.

During his high school years the family moved to Potchefstroom and operated a boarding house. His love for the Bible and his faith in God was noted by several theology students who were lodging at the Heyns' residence. At school Heyns was an average student, and showed little interest in the subjects at hand. He did however display a flair for debate and independent thinking on complex topics – after one such discussion (regarding Charles Darwin's evolutionary theory) one theology student voiced his concern to Heyns' parents that the young man might be losing his mind.

=== Higher education ===
Heyns completed his undergraduate studies at the Potchefstroom University for Christian Higher Education where he formed a lifelong friendship with Hendrik G. Stoker, the South African Calvinistic thinker and a central advocate of the Philosophy of the Cosmonomic Idea. Stoker's reasoning had a marked influence on the rest of his academic career.

Heyns completed his training as a minister at the University of Pretoria, and decided to continue his theological studies at the Free University in Amsterdam. In 1953 he obtained a PhD under the supervision of G. C. Berkouwer with a thesis titled Die Grondstruktuur van die Modalistiese Triniteitsbeskouing (The Basis of the Modalistic Trinity View).

In 1961 he obtained a second PhD (in philosophy) under the supervision of Stoker. His thesis was titled Die Teologiese Antropologie van Karl Barth vanuit Wysgerig-Antropologiese Oriëntering (The Theological Anthropology of Karl Barth from a Philosophical-Anthropological Orientation).

== Career ==
In 1954, after completion of his theological studies in Amsterdam, Heyns became an ordained minister and served at the Ysterplaat congregation of the NGK. Towards the end of 1960 he transferred to Rondebosch where he counted several Afrikaner politicians amongst his flock (including Hendrik Verwoerd, John Vorster, and P. W. Botha).

Heyns' academic career started in 1966 when he was appointed as lecturer in dogmatic subjects at the University of Stellenbosch. In 1971 he succeeded A. B. Du Preez as professor at the University of Pretoria where he stayed until his retirement at the end of 1993.

During the more than 20 years that Heyns served the NGK as a professor, he exerted an enormous influence on the church. He was distinguished by a large number of publications and he filled many public positions in the church, causing him to be regarded as one of the best known theologians in the NGK.

=== Heyns's confrontation with Jurie le Roux ===
Upon Heyns's retirement, a special edition of Skrif en Kerk, the NGK's journal at the University of Pretoria, was dedicated to his influential theology. In this edition friends and colleagues of Heyns engaged in dialogue, appraising his work on different premises. Theologians Conrad Wethmar, Willie Jonker and Jurie le Roux were among the contributors. The latter's contribution initiated a controversial discourse, the effects of which became increasingly evident in the subsequent "liberal" viewpoints which gained traction in the NGK since Heyns's death. Jurie le Roux, NGK Old Testament biblical scholar from Pretoria at the time (described as politically conservative but theologically more "liberal"), accused Heyns of not engaging with the "unchallengeable" results of historical criticism (Afrikaans: onaanvegbare resultate van die historiese kritiek).

Le Roux argued that if Heyns had done so, he would likely have agreed that it was a) impossible to speak of the unity of Scripture's message; b) imperative to completely discard settled patterns of reasoning (Afrikaans: gevestigde denkpatrone) in Christianity; c) to be accepted that the church can no longer relay its message authoritatively; 4) to be acknowledged that the cosmos in its entirety did not require elucidation by the "light" of Revelation. Heyns responded with grace, but also expressed his serious concern about Le Roux's deductions from historical criticism. Heyns replied that if the acceptance of the results of historical criticism were to lead and force theologians into such interpretations, it would in his view set systematic theologians, besides biblical scholars, on a perilous course.[17] 163. Heyns's words were prophetic, in light of Le Roux's notably supportive review of Fatherless in Galilee (2003), the pioneering historical book by the Jesus Seminar scholar, Andries Van Aarde.

=== Views on apartheid ===
In the 1980s and the early 1990s, Heyns became a central figure in the struggle to change the NGK's stance on apartheid, leading to the church's eventual rejection of that policy. In 1982 Heyns publicly rejected the notion that apartheid was the will of God, and caused a furore at that year's synod by openly supporting multiracial marriages. For a year he stayed out of favour with the church hierarchy, but reemerged in 1986 to become moderator – the highest position in the church. He immediately tried to persuade the church that there was no biblical foundation for apartheid.

Following the NGK Synod of 1986 (at which Heyns presided), tens of thousands of church members and many congregations broke away to form the Afrikaans Protestant Church. In September 1989, at a time when the government indiscriminately crushed all protest marches, mediation by NGK leadership under Heyns convinced the government to allow peaceful protests. This concession heralded the first swing away from the armed struggle to a strategy of non-violent confrontation.

In 1990, speaking for the NGK, Heyns declared apartheid a sin. His theological contributions had a large impact on changing the thinking of the Afrikaner government.

== Assassination ==
On Saturday evening, 5 November 1994, Heyns was playing cards with his wife and three grandchildren (then aged 2, 8 and 11) at his home in Pretoria when he was shot and killed by an unidentified attacker. The attacker used a .303 calibre rifle which delivered a single gunshot through a window. The bullet entered at the back of Heyns's neck and left near his eye, leaving a wound as big as a man's fist. Heyns died instantly. He was 66 years old.

Although the police would not speculate on a motive, many were convinced that Heyns was killed by white extremists. Shortly after his assassination, a secretary who worked at Die Burger, an Afrikaans newspaper, received threats that three Afrikaans-speaking cabinet members would be next. The caller told the secretary that he had already lost everything as a result of affirmative action: "We belong… I belong to no organization. And this will not be the last one." Subsequent threats followed, indicating that Mandela was also a target.

== See also ==
- List of people assassinated in Africa
- List of unsolved murders (1980–1999)
