= G. C. Berkouwer =

Dutch theologian (1903–1996)

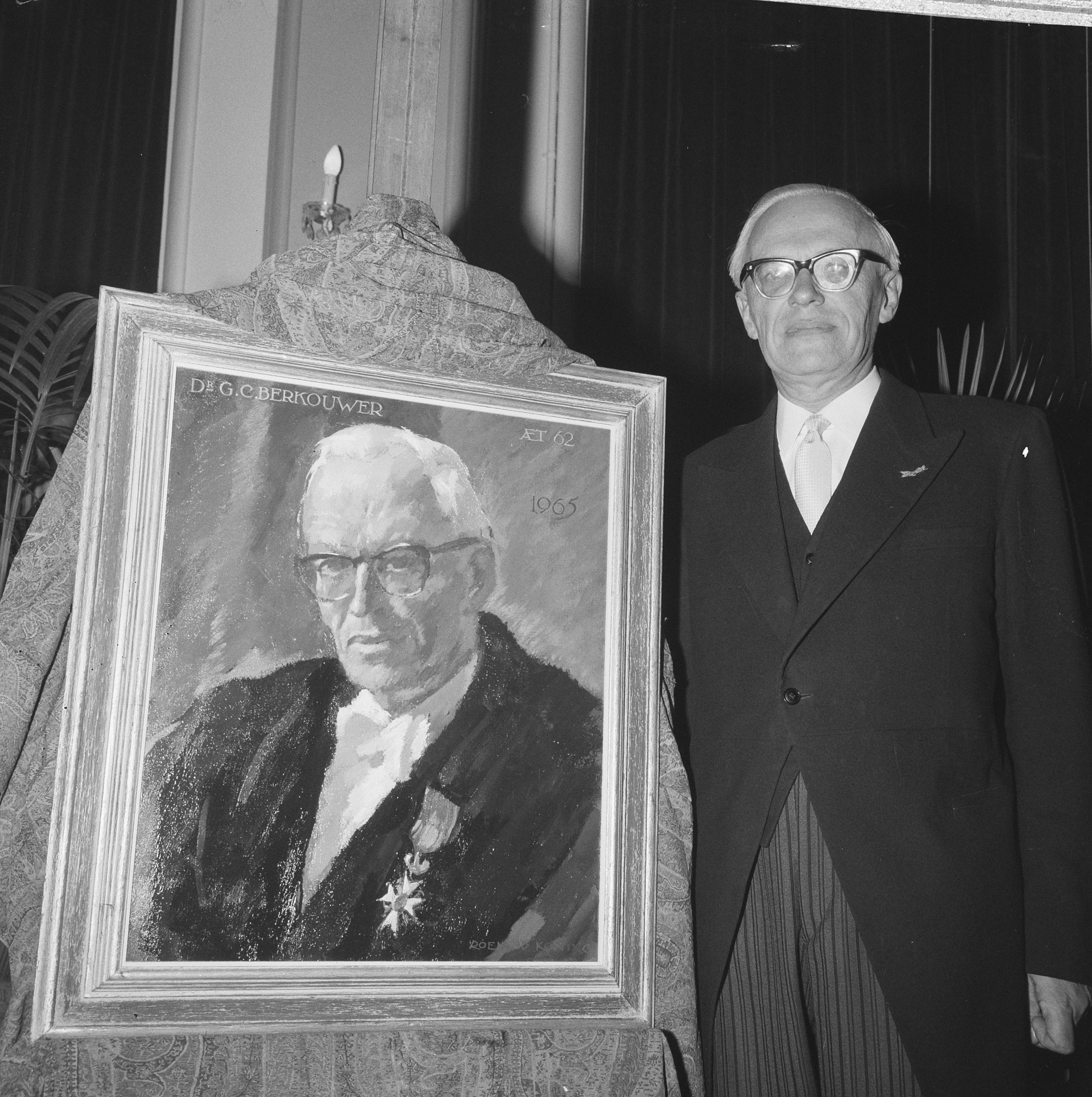
- Berkouwer in 1965
- Born: Gerrit Cornelis Berkouwer; 8 June 1903; Amsterdam, Netherlands
- Died: 25 January 1996 (aged 92); Voorhout, Netherlands

Academic background
- Education: Free University of Amsterdam

Academic work
- Discipline: Theology
- Sub-discipline: Systematic theology
- School or tradition: Reformed Christianity
- Institutions: Free University of Amsterdam
- Doctoral students: Johan Heyns; Harry M. Kuitert; Hans Karl LaRondelle; Jack Rogers; R. C. Sproul; Conrad J. Wethmar
- Notable works: Studies in Dogmatics (1949–1972)

Gerrit Cornelis "G.C." Berkouwer (8 June 1903 – 25 January 1996) was for years the leading theologian of the Reformed Churches in the Netherlands (GKN). He occupied the chair in systematic theology of the Faculty of Theology, Free University (VU) in Amsterdam.

Berkouwer was born in Amsterdam on 8 June 1903. He was raised in Zaandam. In 1927 he married Catharina Cornelia Elisabeth Rippen in The Hague. In 1932 he obtained his doctorate from the Free University; his dissertation was entitled Geloof en Openbaring in de nieuwe Duitse theologie (Faith and Revelation in Recent German Theology). In 1949 the first volume of his eighteen-volume Studies in Dogmatics appeared in the Netherlands. In 1962 he was an observer at the Second Vatican Council in Rome.

He was very influential among the Reformed churches and other groups in North America, where the many volumes of his series, Studies in Dogmatics, were translated and published. He had a continuous flow of seminary graduates to study under him for the degree of Doctor of Theology. Altogether Berkouwer mentored about 46 students who received the Th.D. degree under his supervision. Many of them became leaders in Christian thought abroad; and, often enough, denominational chief officers.

In 1953, Berkouwer became a member of the Royal Netherlands Academy of Arts and Sciences.

Berkouwer died on 26 January 1996, aged 92, in Voorhout, Netherlands.

== Work in the GKN ==
He came to his post at the Free University after the Second World War in which the Dutch national community suffered much from Nazi occupation, the Holocaust, and culminating in the Hunger Winter of 1944. The Free University, like all Dutch institutions of higher learning, had been shut down, so there was no public teaching. Nevertheless, preaching and pamphlet wars raged in church and society.

One issue was the negative tone of Berkouwer's predecessor, Valentine Hepp to use his role of systematician of Reformed theology to attack two movements in the Reformed church. The first was Reformational philosophy led by D. H. Th. Vollenhoven and Herman Dooyeweerd, VU professors of philosophy and law, respectively. The other was the in-church movement led by Klaas Schilder, against whom Hepp scored a Pyrrhic victory with Berkouwer's leading involvement as president of the GKN Council, meeting on and off between 1943 and 1945 when that Council finally forced Schilder, his colleague Seakle Greijdanus, and other theologians and pastors out of the denominational community along with a good number of GKN churches.

These reorganized themselves as the Liberated churches. Later, Berkouwer indicated regret that he had helped back the split-off group into a corner, and that some other way of handling the differences should have been found.

=== Ecumenism ===
One of Berkouwer's crowning achievements was to be delegated by the Council of the GKN to attend the 1957 assemblies of the International Council of Christian Churches, a world fundamentalist body that met in Amsterdam, and the World Council of Churches, the ecumenical body that met that same year in New Delhi, India. In his report back to the GKN, Berkouwer recommended that they join the latter, and they did so, remaining active and becoming one of the first evangelical denominations to enter the mainstream ecumenical movement.

=== Middle Orthodoxy ===
Berkouwer displayed in his Studies in Dogmatics an openness that allowed him to develop a friendship and shared views with Hendrikus Berkhof, the leading professor of systematics in the Nederlandse Hervormde Kerk (Dutch Reformed Church from which the Gereformeerde Kerken had split-off in the nineteenth century). The emerging collegial view of these two theologians became known as Middle Orthodoxy, and it aimed in an even more ecumenical direction than the Hervormde/Gereformeerde relationship of the time would suggest.

However, it did not extend so far as to relieve the conscience of the VU theological faculty in regard to their required subscription to the seventeenth-century Canons of Dort, a task which remained to Berkouwer's student and successor in the Chair of Dogmatics, Harry M. Kuitert. (Kuitert, however, went further than his mentor, breaking completely with the Berkouwer and Middle Orthodox tradition and turning publicly to an informal unitarian stance.)

== Publications ==
Besides the Studies in Dogmatics (see below), Berkouwer is known for his two books on Roman Catholicism – Conflict with Rome (1948) and, after the Second Vatican Council in 1962, The Second Vatican Council and the New Catholicism – and two books on the work of Swiss theologian Karl Barth – Karl Barth (1954) and The Triumph of Grace in the Theology of Karl Barth (1954). Though this book was quite critical of Barth's thinking at points, Barth considered Berkouwer to be among the few of his reviewers who actually understood him. All of these books were translated into English, and the last was widely read in the English-speaking world.

=== Studies in Dogmatics ===
Berkouwer wrote a new theological short essay in almost every issue of the GKN weekly Gereformeerde Weekblad, which garnered responses from clergy and laity all over the Netherlands and beyond. A good part of the articles arose from class lectures to his students at VU, where the newspaper letters of response might carry some weight and sometimes occasioned Berkouwer's refinements for his students. The newspaper theological-articles, letters of response, and classroom refinements in turn led to the publication of books over many years under the general series name, Studies in Dogmatics (the last word usually being rendered in English as systematic theology).

The number of titles in the series eventually came to a total of 14 in English, due to the combination of some paired Dutch volumes into a single volume in English. Among key works were The Person of Christ, The Work of Christ, two volumes on Sin, a volume on The Providence of God (which refers to Herman Dooyeweerd's philosophy), General Revelation (again refers to Dooyeweerd), and The Image of God (which especially made the growing movement of philosophers, scientists, and theologians whose thinking was akin to the ideas of Vollenhoven and Dooyeweerd much more comfortable than they had been under Hepp).

Berkouwer's leadership within the denomination to which most of them belonged was strengthened by this openness of the leading GKN theologian, and it contributed to Berkouwer's developing in turn his own position in tandem with that of his friend Berkhof. In an end-of-career work published in English but not Dutch, Two Hundred Years of Theology: A Report of a Personal Journey (Grand Rapids, Michigan: Eerdmans, 1989), Berkhof assessed – along with many other philosophers, philosophical theologians, and systematic theologians – a few leading Gereformeerde historical figures, including Abraham Kuyper and Berkouwer. Berkhof said of the latter, who was in his Studies so leery of speculation, that he suffered from being "not speculative enough."

But he added that since Berkouwer wanted to produce work in systematic theology that was grounded in careful exegesis of the biblical texts for all doctrinal teaching, according to a Reformed tradition of interpretation of the Bible, he mentions few philosophers and interacts sparingly with only one contemporary philosopher, Dooyeweerd, who theologically seems to have had some kinship with Berkouwer and Berkhof's Middle Orthodoxy.

==== Books ====
The full list in the Dutch originals with their publication dates and pages is presented below with the corresponding list of the English translation titles, publication dates, and total pages. Please note that in subsequent reprints of the English, paginations vary from the original English edition. Also, technical matter in the Dutch that referred to earlier theological debates in that historical context have sometimes been removed in the English translations. The original publisher of the Dutch series is Kok (Amsterdam, the Netherlands); the English, Eerdmans (Grand Rapids, Michigan, USA).

Dutch title (Kok: Amsterdam)	Date	Pages	English title (Eerdmans: Grand Rapids)	Date	Pages
Geloof en Rechtvaardiging	1949	220	Faith and Justification	1952	207
Geloof en Heiliging	1949	222	Faith and Sanctification	1952	193
Geloof en Volharding	1949	215	Faith and Perseverance	1958	256
De Voorzienigheid Gods	1950	336	The Providence of God	1952	280
De Algemene Openbaring	1951	280	General Revelation	1955	336
De Persoon van Christus	1952	334	The Person of Christ	1954	368
Het Werk van Christus	1953	387	The Work of Christ	1965	358
De Sacramenten	1954	407	The Sacraments	1969	304
De Verkiezing Gods	1955	414	Divine Election	1960	336
De Mens het Beeld Gods	1957	416	Man: The Image of God	1962	376
De Zonde I	1958	230	Sin	1971	599
De Zonde II	1960	360	Sin	1971	599
De Wederkomst van Christus I	1961	311	The Return of Christ	1972	477
De Wederkomst van Christus II	1963	282	The Return of Christ	1972	477
De Heilige Schrift I	1966	234	Holy Scripture	1975	377
De Heilige Schrift II	1967	463	Holy Scripture	1975	377
De Kerk I Eenheid en Katholiciteit	1970	260	The Church	1976	438
De Kerk II Apostoliciteit en Heiligheid	1972	273	The Church	1976	438

== Footnotes ==
Academic offices
Preceded by G. H. A. Grosheide F. Wzn	Rector Magnificus of the Vrije Universiteit Amsterdam; 1958–1959	Succeeded by Koos Verdam
