= Hans Karl LaRondelle =

Seventh-day Adventist theologian

Hans K. LaRondelle

Personal details
- Born: 1929 Netherlands
- Died: 2011 (aged 81–82)
- Occupation: Theologian

Hans Karl LaRondelle (born April 18, 1929 – March 7, 2011) was a respected Seventh-day Adventist theologian; a strong proponent of the gospel and salvation by faith alone. In a 1985 questionnaire of North American Adventist Theology lecturers, LaRondelle tied for fourth place among the Adventist authors who had most influenced them, and was number one amongst the under 39 age group. He died March 7, 2011.

== Biography ==
In 1929, LaRondelle was born in the Netherlands into a Roman Catholic family. From the age of eight, he received education in Protestant schools. While a law student at Leyden University, at the age of nineteen, he read a book by Voorthuis, a Dutch Adventist minister. Later, he met this man and studied the Bible with him. In 1949, he came to believe the Seventh-day Adventist message by studying the book The Great Controversy by Adventist pioneer and visionary, Ellen G. White. He served in his Netherlands homeland as a pastor, evangelist, youth leader, and teacher for fourteen years. In 1960, on the encouragement of Adventist educator, Dr. W. G. C. Murdoch, he began studies at the Free University of Amsterdam. He studied for six years under Professor G.C. Berkouwer. At the same time he carried a full ministerial work load. In 1962, he was ordained while pastoring in the Netherlands. In 1966, he went to Detroit in America as a delegate from the Netherlands Union to the General Conference session. He enjoyed the sense of freedom in the United States and decided to continue his education at Andrews University. While he was a student at Andrews, a member of the staff, Dr. E. E. Heppenstall, was teaching the subject Righteousness by Faith to a class of 116 students. Heppenstall became ill and was unable to continue teaching the course. Some students asked the administration to have LaRondelle take over the instruction. In 1969, Andrews University sponsored his return to the Netherlands for further study. He studied again under his mentor and friend Professor G. C. Berkouwer at the Reformed Free University, Vrije Universiteit in Amsterdam. Two years later, in 1971, LaRondelle had completed the Doctor of Theology degree in Systematic Theology. He was a professor of Systematic Theology in the Theological Seminary at Andrews University, Berrien Springs, Michigan, U.S.A. from 1967 to 1991. He, along with Desmond Ford and Edward Heppenstall, was a major opponent of Robert Brinsmead's perfectionistic "Sanctuary Awakening" movement. LaRondelle was professor emeritus of theology at the Seventh-day Adventist Theological Seminary at Andrews University. He lived in Bradenton, Florida, where he died March 7, 2011, of thyroid cancer.

== Theology ==
Hans K. LaRondelle studied with G. C. Berkouwer

== Publications ==
- Perfection and Perfectionism: A Dogmatic-Ethical Study of Biblical Perfection and Phenomenal Perfectionism (Andrews University Press, 1975)
- Christ Our Salvation: What God Does For Us and in Us (Mountain View, California: Pacific Press, 1980). 96 pages.
- Deliverance in the Psalms: Messages of Hope for Today (Berrien Springs, MI: First Impressions, 1983). 210 pages.
- The Israel of God in Prophecy: Principles of Prophetic Interpretation (Andrews University Press, 1983). 226 pages. ISBN 978-0-943872-14-8 (publisher's page; brief sample). Adventist Kenneth Strand reviewed it as "the best work that I have seen on this subject" (Ministry September 1983, p. 32). See also Jon Paulien's review in AUSS Autumn 1984, p. 373–76.
- Chariots of Salvation: The Biblical Drama of Armageddon (Review and Herald Publishing Association, 1987). 192 pages.
- Our Creator Redeemer: An Introduction to Biblical Covenant Theology (Andrews University Press). 208 pages. ISBN 978-1-883925-48-2 (publisher's page; brief sample)
- How to Understand the End-Time Prophecies of the Bible (Sarasota, Florida: First Impressions, 1997)
- Light for the Last Days: Jesus’ Endtime Prophecies Made Plain in the Book of Revelation (Pacific Press, 2000). See review by Desmond Ford

== See also ==
- Seventh-day Adventist Church
- Seventh-day Adventist theology
- Seventh-day Adventist eschatology
- History of the Seventh-day Adventist Church
- 28 Fundamental Beliefs
- Questions on Doctrine
- Teachings of Ellen G. White
- Inspiration of Ellen G. White
- Prophecy in the Seventh-day Adventist Church
- Investigative judgment
- Pillars of Adventism
- Second Coming
- Conditional Immortality
- Historicism
- Three Angels' Messages
- Sabbath in seventh-day churches
- Ellen G. White
- Adventist Review
- Adventism
- Seventh-day Adventist Church Pioneers
- Seventh-day Adventist worship
