= Harry M. Kuitert =

Dutch theologian (1924–2017)

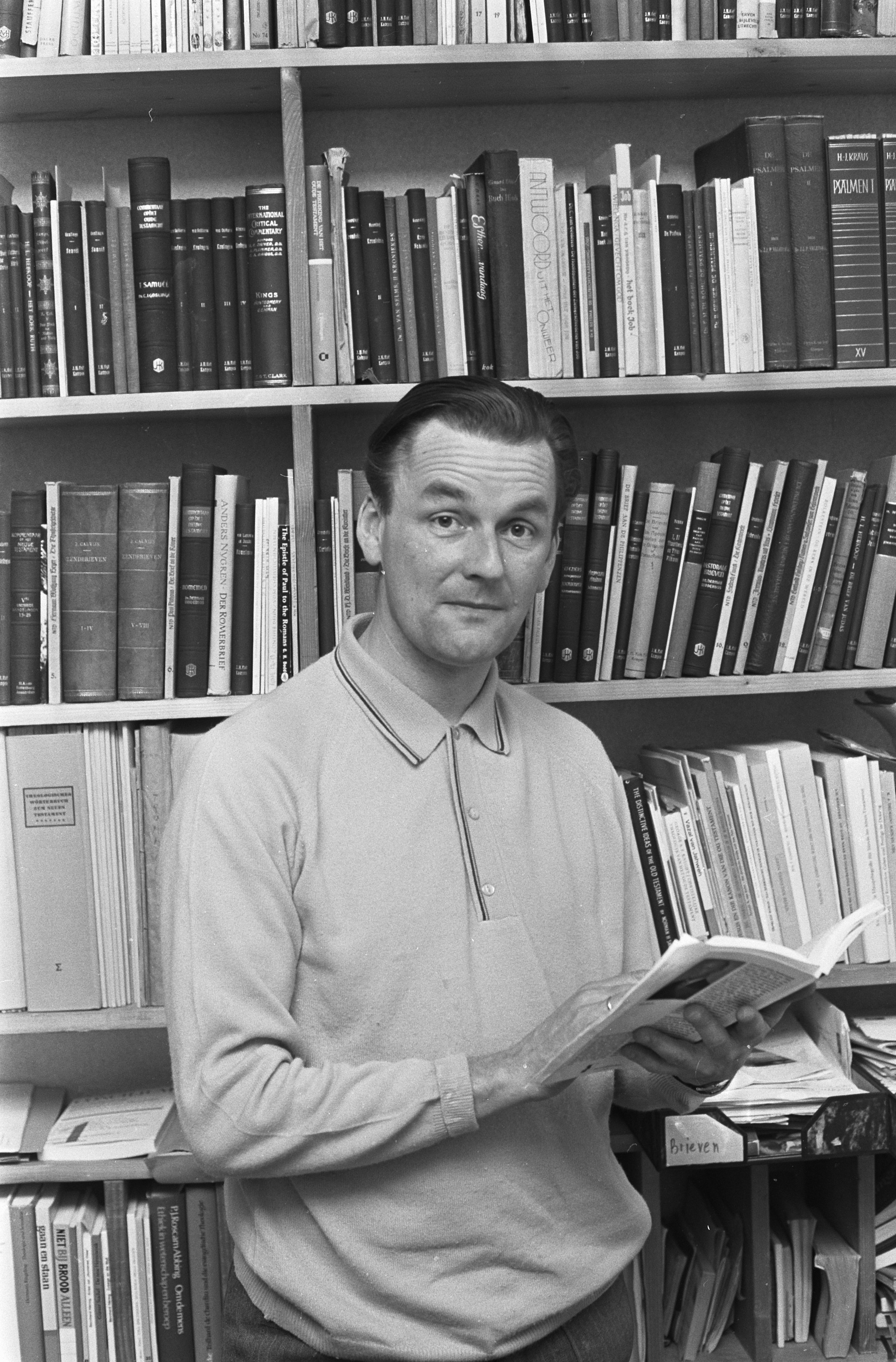
Dr. H.M. Kuitert in 1969

Harminus Martinus "Harry" Kuitert (11 November 1924 in Drachten – 8 September 2017 in Amstelveen) was a theologian of the Reformed Churches in the Netherlands (GKN).

Harry Kuitert (baptised Harminus Martinus) was a rector at Scharendijk (Zeeland) and a student pastor at Amsterdam before he became a professor of theology. In Zeeland, he witnessed the great North Sea flood of 1953 which inundated large parts of this Dutch province.

In 1967, he succeeded the illustrious theologian G. C. Berkouwer as professor of systematic theology at the Free University (VU) in Amsterdam, and in 1989 he retired from this chair. Kuitert moved from Calvinist orthodoxy to Calvinist middle orthodoxy following his mentor and Ph.D. supervisor Berkouwer, for whom he wrote his dissertation on the Divine Co-Humanity (Dutch: medemenselijkheid; Afrikaans: Medemenslikheid).

Later, after writing voluminously, critically, and appreciatively on Karl Barth, Kuitert later moved on to a totally unorthodox stance on Jesus Christ, skipping neo-orthodoxy altogether. Kuitert developed his views beyond those of Berkouwer whose views seemed definitive.

According to Ecumenical News International, Kuitert, after his own emeritation in 1989, and by now the most widely read theologian in the Netherlands, broke completely with Berkouwer and "Middle Orthodox" tradition (the theological mainstream of the reformed church) in his book, Jesus, the Inheritance of Christianity (1998). "Jesus supported the Jewish view of God, so he never saw himself as God on earth. He is not a Second God, nor the Second Person of the Holy Trinity", said the 80-year-old Kuitert, adopting publicly an informal unitarian stance on the key doctrine of Christian faith, much to the grief of those who continue to love and appreciate the work of Kuitert's mentor Berkouwer.

Another widely read book, both by Protestants and Catholics, is his Het algemeen betwijfeld christelijk geloof (1992), translated as I have my doubts: how to become a Christian without being a fundamentalist (1993). In this book he gives a succinct overview of the gaps he perceives between tradition, dogma, the classic Christian theological themes and the questions of people nowadays. His avowed goal is to go back to the purposes behind the classic forms of Christian doctrine in order to enable the faithful to renew and develop their faith facing the 21st century. His works have been translated into several languages. Critics have argued that this book is an exercise in refined agnosticism, and that Kuitert can no longer be properly considered a Christian theologian.

== Bibliography ==
- Harry M. Kuitert (1994). "Veritatis Splendor". Studies in Christian Ethics. pp. 19–21. Archived from the original on 2013-02-01.
- Signals from the Bible ISBN 0-8028-1439-5

== Links ==
- Harry Kuitert and the Possibility of a Public Witness of the Church, brill.com. Accessed 25 September 2023.
