= Hendrik G. Stoker =

South African Calvinistic philosopher

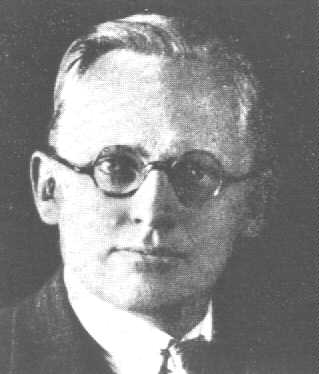
- Born: Hendrik Gerhardus Stoker; 4 April 1899; Johannesburg, South African Republic
- Died: 16 May 1993 (aged 94); Potchefstroom, South Africa
- Occupations: Philosopher; academic
- Spouse: Miriam Francoise du Plessis (m. 1925)
- Children: 4
- Awards: President's Decoration for Distinguished Service, 1987

Academic background
- Education: University of South Africa; University of Cologne
- Thesis: Das Gewissen: Erscheinungsformen und Theorien (English: Nature and the forms of conscience) (1925)
- Doctoral advisor: Max Scheler
- Influences: Herman Bavinck

Academic work
- Discipline: Philosophy
- School or tradition: Reformational philosophy
- Institutions: Potchefstroom University for Christian Higher Education; Rand Afrikaans University
- Doctoral students: Johan Heyns
- Notable works: Wysbegeerte van die skeppingsidee
- Influenced: Cornelius Van Til

Hendrik G. Stoker (1899–1993) was a South African Neo-Calvinist philosopher in the Afrikaner Calvinist tradition, academic, Afrikaner nationalist and supporter of Apartheid, known during his lifetime for the development of the "Philosophy of the creation-idea".

== Early life and education ==
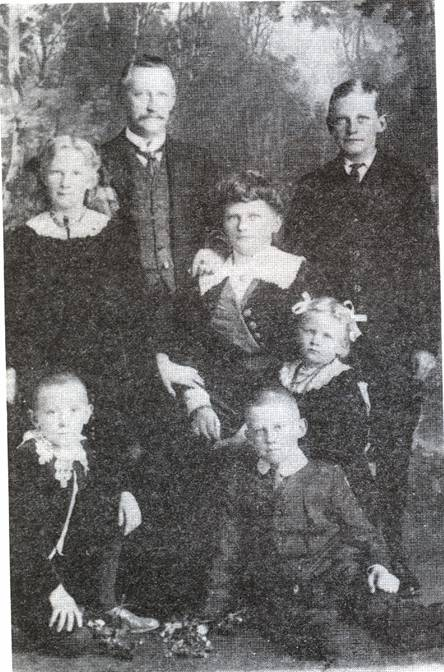
Photo of the Stoker family, Hendrik is on the far right.

Hendrik Gerhardus Stoker was born on 4 April 1899 in Johannesburg. South African Republic (present-day, South Africa) to Pieter Stroker and Leentje Nienhuis. Both of Stoker's parents immigrated to South Africa from the Netherlands, with his father being born in Assen and his mother being born in Bedum.

Six months after Stoker was born the Second Boer War broke out, his father joined the Boer commando's as a Dutch volunteer.

Stoker first attended the Deutsche Internationale Schule Johannesburg before graduating in 1916 from Potchefstroom Gimnasium, a Afrikaans language school in Potchefstroom. As a student Stoker attended lecturers at the Literary Department of the Theological School of the Reformed Church.

In 1919, Stoker graduated from either University of South Africa or the University College of Potchefstroom (later renamed the Potchefstroom University for Christian Higher Education). Stoker then studied philosophy under Totius at the University of South Africa, and graduated with a MA in 1921. Totius' lectures on the Book of Isaiah finally convinced Stoker of the value of the Christian life attitude. During this period Stoker also obtained a teaching diploma.

In 1925, Stoker completed his doctoral thesis Das Gewissen: Erscheinungsformen und Theorien (English: Nature and the forms of conscience) at the University of Cologne under the supervision of Max Scheler.

== Career ==
From 1925–1964, Stoker taught at Potchefstroom University for Christian Higher Education (present-day North-West University). From 1930 onwards, Stoker was a professor of philosophy and psychology. From 1969–1972, Stoker was a professor at Rand Afrikaans University.

Stoker was the doctoral advisor of Johan Heyns, who stated that Stoker was one of the greatest philosophers that Africa has ever produced.

B.J. Van der Walt posits that Stoker's obscurity is a result of Stoker mainly publishing in Afrikaans, his cumbersome manner of writing, his Theological-Philosophical career and his support of Apartheid.

== Philosophy ==
Stoker developed a unique strand of Calvinistic philosophy called "Wysbegeerte van die skeppingsidee" or translated in English "Philosophy of the creation-idea". He's disagreed with Herman Dooyeweerd and D. H. Th. Vollenhoven who called their philosophy "Wijsbegeerte van die Wetsidee" or translated "philosophy of the cosmonomic idea", because the creation was more encompassing principle for Stoker than the laws of creation. The name had the further benefit for Stoker that it was distinctly Christian, while the use of the term "law" instead of "creation" was preferred by Dooyeweerd and Vollenhoven.

=== Imprisonment ===
During Jan Smuts' term as Prime Minister Stoker joined the Ossewabrandwag. Stoker was later held at Koffiefontein internment camp on suspicion of being a Nazi sympathiser during Second World War.

At Koffiefontein Stoker founded the informal University of Koffiefontein and gave lectures on Calvinism, political philosophy and theology, John Vorster attended Stoker's lectures.

=== Defense of Apartheid ===
In the article "At the Crossroads: Apartheid and University Freedom in South-Africa" Stoker tried to explain the government's Apartheid policy to the international community. This is one of the few English articles that Stoker wrote. Stoker starts the article by talking about the reality of South Africa's demographics, that the white population is a minority. According to Stoker, the white population was at a crossroads, either they had to integrate with the black populations of South Africa or they had to differentiate. The way of integration according to Stoker would be a Liberalist solution that would lead to the loss of the uniqueness of the Afrikaner community. It is within this context that Stoker opted for differentiation, rather than integration.

Stoker can probably be seen as one of the main theological underpinnings of the apartheid ideology and made statements about it and wrote about it. H.H. William writes about it:

Stoker takes an honest, albeit idealistic, view of the racial situation in South Africa. He states that apartheid is not a comprehensive view of life like, for example, liberalism, but a limited view, which has to do with the unique racial situation regarding the relationship between and the equality of the different races in South Africa. In his defense of the good intentions of apartheid, he states quite idealistically that it seeks to lead the blacks to their highest potential of development and at the same time to protect them from "Europeanisation" and "Westernisation" where these influences, in his opinion, will uproot them and will destroy their racial integrity. Stoker mentions a number of reasons why the racial situation in South Africa has reached a critical stage, for example the inequality in political and civilizational level that has existed between the white majority group and the black minority group since their meeting at the southern tip of Africa. These, as well as cultural differences, resulted in the necessary privileging of the superior group. Adjustments had to be made by both groups. With the urbanization process of the blacks, the racial question became a racial crisis. The crossroads that South Africa came to was the choice that had to be made between integration or differentiation. The most likely alternative, as it could be applied according to liberalism in South Africa, would, according to the fear of the majority of whites, lead to integration and assimilation in economic, cultural, political, social and finally biological areas. Equality in terms of the individual would, because of the preponderance of numbers of the blacks, threaten the whites' existence by absorbing their living space, gaining political power and gaining control over the determination of their future destiny. With the choice of apartheid, the whites wanted to secure their own existence and maintain control over their own future determination and they thought that they could best arrange matters for peaceful coexistence for the other racial groups in the country.

There are several people today who blame Stoker for this, such as the following quote from the church archive of the Dutch Reformed Church:

Political and spiritual leaders as well as theologians from the ranks of the church often have the justification that gives the ideology and practice of apartheid a semblance of given acceptability.

In 1957, Stoker advocated for separate universities for Africans, White, and Coloured people, and for the further extension of apartheid education policies.

In 1994, J.H. van Wyk wrote an article in which he criticized Stoker for considering the nation as a primary social bond and consequently considered the nation more important than the kingdom of God.

=== Antisemitism ===
Stoker held Antisemitic views, believing that Jews shouldn't be given full civil rights whilst also stating that Antisemitism should be rejected.

=== Scholastic influence ===
B.J. Van der Walt criticizes Stoker for not succeeding in freeing himself from the scholastic influence of Herman Bavinck. Bavinck is considered by Van der Walt to be a scholastic thinker and initially Stoker planned to study under Bavinck. Van der Walt also believes that Stoker did not succeed in establishing Christian Philosophy, because according to Stoker, Philosophy was still dependent on Theology.

== Personal life ==
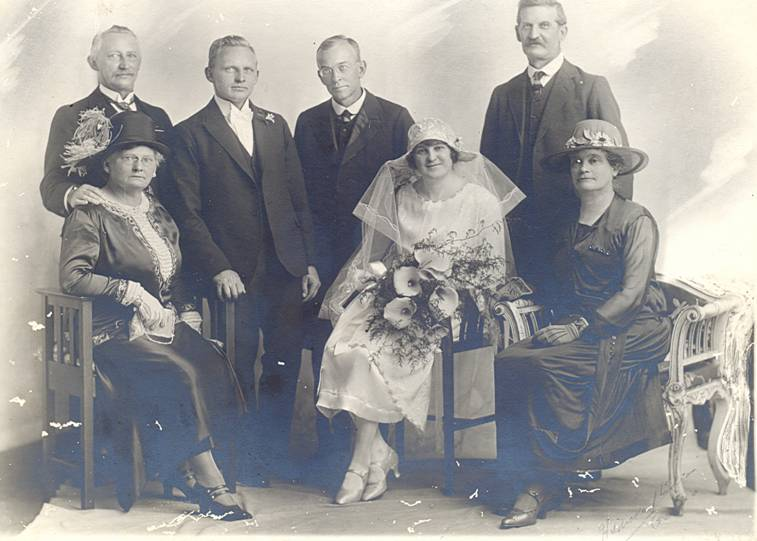
Marriage photo of Stoker (center-left) and his wife (center-right), joined by Totius (middle)

In September 1925, Stoker married Miriam Francoise du Plessis (1902–1994) at the Pretoria Reformed Church. The wedding was officiated by Totius.

Stoker and Plessis had four children.

== Publications ==
- Een en ander oor menslike vrijheid. In: Festschrift für H.J. de Vleeschauwer. 1960, S. 150−172.

== Awards ==
- 1957: Master Prize of the Afrikaans Literary Association
- 1964: Stals Prize for Philosophy awarded by the South African Academy of Science and Art
- 1987: Honorary doctorate awarded by Rand Afrikaans University
- 1987: President's Decoration for Distinguished Service
