= Ivor Davidson =

British theologian

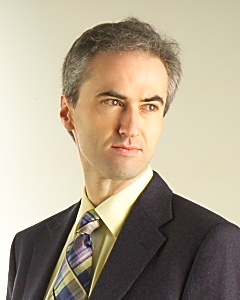
Davidson in 2007

Ivor J. Davidson is a British theologian and academic administrator.

Davidson held chairs in Systematic and Historical Theology at the University of Otago, New Zealand, where he was based from 1997 until 2009, and the University of St Andrews, 2009–16. He is an Honorary Professor in Theology at the University of Aberdeen.

At the University of St Andrews, Davidson was Head of School and Dean of the Faculty of Divinity and Principal of St Mary's College, 2010–13. He was educated in Classics and Theology at the University of Glasgow and the University of Edinburgh.

== Books ==
- Salvation. Bloomsbury T & T Clark 2016
- A Short History of Arianism. Cambridge University Press 2017
- The Cambridge Handbook of Early Christian Theology. Cambridge University Press 2017
- The Study of Theology. SPCK 2017
- God of Salvation: Soteriology in Theological Perspective. Ivor J. Davidson and Murray A. Rae. Ashgate 2011.
- A Public Faith: From Constantine to the Medieval World, AD 312-600. Baker/Monarch 2005
- Birth of the Church: From Jesus to Constantine, AD 30-312., Baker, 2004/Monarch, 2005
- Ambrose: De Officiis : Edited with an Introduction, Translation and Commentary (2 vols). Oxford University Press, 2002
