= Biblioblog =

Blog focusing on biblical studies

A biblioblog is a blog with a significant focus on biblical studies. A blogger of a biblioblog is termed a biblioblogger. The activity of blogging on a biblioblog is termed biblioblogging.

On September 11, 2009, the Society of Biblical Literature (SBL) granted "Bibliobloggers" affiliate status. The SBL nonexclusively defined "Bibliobloggers" as "the over 300 people who blog about the Bible." The first "biblioblogger" section was held during the SBL's 2010 annual meeting, with Robert Cargill presiding. Jim Davila, Michael Barber, Christian Brady, and James McGrath presented papers on the rise of biblioblogging and the need to consider online scholarship (or bloggership) as a legitimate means in conducting the critical studies of humanities.
