= Donald McKim =

American Presbyterian theologian (born 1950)

Donald K. McKim (born 1950) is an American Presbyterian theologian and editor. He works as Academic and Reference Editor for Westminster John Knox Press.

McKim studied at Westminster College, Pittsburgh Theological Seminary, and the University of Pittsburgh. He has taught at Memphis Theological Seminary and the University of Dubuque Theological Seminary.

McKim is known for his 1979 book The Authority and Interpretation of the Bible: An Historical Approach. Co-authored with Jack B. Rogers, it was Eternity magazine's "Book of the Year" in 1980. In the book, Rogers and McKim argued that the Bible was infallible but not inerrant.

Donald Keith McKim was born in New Castle, Pennsylvania, on February 25, 1950, to Keith Beatty and Mary Alisan (Leslie) McKim.

== Works ==
- Heinrich Bullinger: An Introduction to His Life and Theology (2022), Cascade Companions, co-authored by Jim West (biblical scholar).
- McKim, Donald K.; Jack B. Rogers (5 February 1999). The Authority and Interpretation of the Bible: An Historical Approach. Wipf & Stock (published 1979). ISBN 978-1-5791--0213-5.
- McKim, Donald K. (January 1988). Theological Turning Points. Westminster John Knox Press (published 1988). ISBN 978-0-8042-0702-7.
- McKim, Donald K., ed. (1992). Encyclopedia Of The Reformed Faith Hardback. Edinburgh: St. Andrew Press. ISBN 0-7152-0660-5.
- McKim, Donald K. (January 1996). The Westminster Dictionary of Theological Terms. Westminster John Knox Press (published 1996). ISBN 978-0-6642-5511-4.
- McKim, Donald K., ed. (1998). Historical Handbook of Major Biblical Interpreters. IVP Academic. ISBN 978-0-8308-1452-7.
- McKim, Donald K. (17 June 2004). The Cambridge Companion to John Calvin. Cambridge Companions to Religion. Cambridge University Press (published 2004). ISBN 9780521016728.
- McKim, Donald K., ed. (12 November 2007). Dictionary of Major Biblical Interpreters. IVP Academic (published 2007). ISBN 978-0-8308-2927-9.
- McKim, Donald K. (January 2011). A Down and Dirty Guide to Theology. Westminster John Knox Press (published 2011). ISBN 978-0-6642-3405-8.
