= William John Lyons =

British theologian (born 1966)

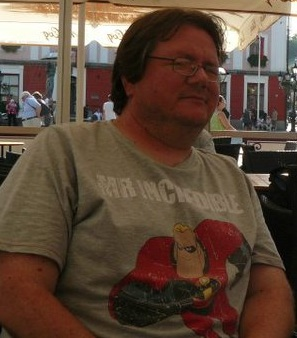
William John Lyons

William John Lyons (born 1966, Sheffield), a.k.a. John Lyons, is a reader in religion and history in the Department of History (historical studies) at the University of Bristol. He holds a BA in biblical studies (1994), an MA in biblical studies (1995), and a PhD in biblical studies (1999), all from the University of Sheffield. He was appointed lecturer in New Testament studies at the University of Bristol in 2001 and then senior lecturer in biblical Interpretation in 2007.

His main area of research is the reception history of the Bible. His publications include Canon and Exegesis: The Canonical Approach and the Sodom Narrative (Sheffield: Sheffield Academic Press, 2002); New Directions in Qumran Studies: Proceedings from the Bristol Colloquium on the Dead Sea Scrolls, 8–10th September 2003 (London: Continuum, 2005); co-edited with J.G. Campbell and L.K. Pietersen; and The Way the World Ends? The Apocalypse of John in Culture and Ideology (Sheffield: Sheffield Phoenix Press, 2009); co-edited with J. Økland.

Lyons has published on the reception of the Bible within the life and work of Johnny Cash, including: the "Cash, Johnny" entry in the Encyclopedia of the Bible and Its Reception (2009–), "The Apocalypse of John and Its Mediators, or Why Johnny Cash Wrote a Better Apocalypse than John of Patmos!", and "The Apocalypse According to Johnny Cash: Examining the 'Effect' of Revelation on a Contemporary Apocalyptic Writer."
