= Jack Rogers (minister) =

American Presbyterian minister and theologian

The Reverend Jack Rogers
- Born: Jack Bartlett Rogers; January 23, 1934; Lincoln, Nebraska, US
- Died: July 14, 2016 (aged 82)
- Spouse: Sharon Mangold (m. 1957)

Ecclesiastical career
- Church: United Presbyterian Church in the United States of America; Presbyterian Church (USA)
- Ordained: 1959
- Offices held: Moderator of the General Assembly (2001–2002)

Academic background
- Education: University of Nebraska; Pittsburgh Theological Seminary; Free University of Amsterdam
- Thesis: Scripture in the Westminster Confession: A Problem of Historical Interpretation for American Presbyterianism (1966)
- Doctoral advisor: G. C. Berkouwer

Academic work
- Discipline: Theology
- Sub-discipline: Philosophical theology
- Institutions: Westminster College; Fuller Theological Seminary; San Francisco Theological Seminary
- Influenced: Roger E. Olson
- Website: www.drjackrogers.com

Jack Bartlett Rogers (January 23, 1934 – July 14, 2016) was a Presbyterian minister and theologian. He taught at Westminster College, Pennsylvania, at Fuller Theological Seminary, and at San Francisco Theological Seminary. He also served as moderator of the 213th General Assembly of the Presbyterian Church (USA).

He pursued an undergraduate degree in philosophy at the University of Nebraska, where he was taught by O.K. Bouwsma.

== Publications ==
Worldcat lists 48 published works by Rogers. Among them are:

- The Authority and Interpretation of the Bible: An Historical Approach, (with Donald McKim)
- Biblical Authority
- Claiming the Center: Churches and Conflicting Worldviews
- Confessions of a Conservative Evangelical
- Introduction to Philosophy: A Case Method Approach (with Forrest Baird)
- Jesus, The Bible, and Homosexuality: Explode the Myths, Heal the Church
- Presbyterian Creeds: A Guide to the Book of Confessions
- Presbyterian Creeds: Supplement on the Brief Statement of Faith
- Reading the Bible and the Confessions: The Presbyterian Way

Religious titles
Preceded by Syngman Rhee	Moderator of the General Assembly of the Presbyterian Church (USA); 2001–2002	Succeeded by Fahed Abu-Akel
