= Fundamentalism =

Unwavering attachment to a set of irreducible beliefs

Fundamentalism is a tendency among certain groups and individuals that is characterized by the application of a strict literal interpretation to scriptures, dogmas, or ideologies, along with a strong belief in the importance of distinguishing one's ingroup and outgroup, which leads to an emphasis on some conception of "purity", and a desire to return to a previous ideal from which advocates believe members have strayed. The term is usually used in the context of religion to indicate an unwavering attachment to a set of irreducible beliefs (the "fundamentals").

The term "fundamentalism" is generally regarded by scholars of religion as referring to a largely modern religious phenomenon which, while itself a reinterpretation of religion as defined by the parameters of modernism, reifies religion in reaction against modernist, secularist, liberal and ecumenical tendencies developing in religion and society in general that it perceives to be foreign to a particular religious tradition. Depending upon the context, the label "fundamentalism" can be a pejorative rather than a neutral characterization, similar to the ways that calling political perspectives "right-wing" or "left-wing" can have negative connotations.

== Religious fundamentalism ==
=== Buddhism ===
Buddhist fundamentalists have targeted other religious and ethnic groups, as in Myanmar. A Buddhist-dominated country, Myanmar has seen tensions between Muslim minorities and the Buddhist majority, especially during the 2013 Burma anti-Muslim riots (possibly instigated by hardline groups such as the 969 Movement). as well as during actions which are associated with the Rohingya genocide (2016 onwards).

Buddhist fundamentalism also features in Sri Lanka. Buddhist-dominated Sri Lanka has seen recent tensions between Muslim minorities and the Buddhist majority, especially during the 2014 anti-Muslim riots in Sri Lanka and in the course of the 2018 anti-Muslim riots in Sri Lanka, allegedly instigated by hardline groups such as the Bodu Bala Sena.

Historic and contemporary examples of Buddhist fundamentalism occur in each of the three main branches of Buddhism: Theravada, Mahayana, and Vajrayana. In addition to the above examples of fundamentalism in Theravada-dominated societies, the reification of a protector deity, Dorje Shugden, by 19th-century Tibetan lama Pabongkhapa could be seen as an example of fundamentalism in the Vajrayana tradition. Dorje Shugden was a key tool in Pabongkhapa's persecution of the flourishing Rimé movement, an ecumenical movement which fused the teachings of the Sakya, Kagyu and Nyingma, in response to the dominance of the Gelug school. While Pabongkhapa had an initially inclusive view early in his life, he received a number of signs that he had displeased Dorje Shugden by receiving teachings from non-Gelug schools, and thus initiated a revival movement that opposed the mixing of non-Gelug practices by Gelug practitioners. The main function of the deity was presented as "the protection of the Ge-luk tradition through violent means, even including the killing of its enemies." Crucially, however, these "‘enemies’ of the Gelug refers less to the members of rival schools than to members of the Gelug tradition ‘who mix Dzong-ka-ba’s tradition with elements coming from other traditions, particularly the Nying-ma Dzok-chen’."

In Japan, a prominent example has been the practice among some members of the Mahayana Nichiren sect of shakubuku – a method of proselytizing which involves the strident condemnation of other sects as deficient or evil.

=== Christianity ===
George Marsden has defined Christian fundamentalism as the demand for strict adherence to certain theological doctrines, in opposition to Modernist theology. Its supporters originally coined the term in order to describe what they claimed were five specific classic theological beliefs of Christianity, and the coinage of the term led to the development of a Christian fundamentalist movement within the Protestant community of the United States in the early part of the 20th century. Fundamentalism as a movement arose in the United States, starting among conservative Presbyterian theologians at Princeton Theological Seminary in the late 19th century. It soon spread to conservatives among the Baptists and other denominations around 1910 to 1920. The movement's purpose was to reaffirm key theological tenets and defend them against the challenges of liberal theology and higher criticism.

The concept of "fundamentalism" has roots in the Niagara Bible Conferences which were held annually between 1878 and 1897. During those conferences, the tenets widely considered to be fundamental Christian belief were identified.

"Fundamentalism" was prefigured by The Fundamentals: A Testimony To The Truth, a collection of twelve pamphlets published between 1910 and 1915 by brothers Milton and Lyman Stewart. It is widely considered to be the foundation of modern Christian fundamentalism.

In 1910, the General Assembly of the Presbyterian Church identified what became known as the five fundamentals:

- Biblical inspiration and the infallibility of scripture as a result of this
- Virgin birth of Jesus
- Belief that Christ's death was the atonement for sin
- Bodily resurrection of Jesus
- Historical reality of the miracles of Jesus

In 1920, the word "fundamentalist" was first used in print by Curtis Lee Laws, editor of The Watchman Examiner, a Baptist newspaper, who proposed that Christians fighting for the fundamentals of the faith should be called "fundamentalists".

Theological conservatives who rallied around the five fundamentals came to be known as "fundamentalists". They rejected any commonality with theologically related religious traditions, such as the grouping of Christianity, Islam, and Judaism into one Abrahamic family of religions. By contrast, while Evangelical groups (such as the Billy Graham Evangelistic Association) typically agree with the "fundamentals" as they are expressed in The Fundamentals, they are often willing to participate in events with religious groups that do not hold to the "essential" doctrines.

=== Ethnic tribal religions ===
A few scholars label some indigenist revitalization movements within ethnic and indigenous religions who reject the changes brought by the modern states and major religions in favor of a return to traditional ways as fundamentalists in contrast with syncretic reform movements. Thus, numerous new generally fundamentalist Native American religious movements include the Pueblo Revolt (1680s), the Shawnee Prophet Movement (1805–1811), the Cherokee Prophet Movement (1811–1813), the Red Stick War (1813–1814), White Path's Rebellion (1826), the Winnebago Prophet Movement (1830–1832), the first Ghost Dance (1869–1870) and the second Ghost Dance (1889–1890), and the Snake movements among the Cherokee, Choctaw, and Muscogee Creek peoples during the 1890s.

=== Hinduism ===
The existence of fundamentalism in Hinduism is a complex and contradictory phenomenon. While some would argue that certain aspects of Gaudiya Vaishnavism manifest fundamentalist tendencies, these tendencies are more clearly displayed in Hindutva, the predominant form of Hindu nationalism in India today, and an increasingly powerful and influential voice within the religion. Hinduism includes a diversity of ideas on spirituality and traditions, but has no ecclesiastical order, no unquestionable religious authorities, no governing body, no prophet(s) nor any binding holy book; Hindus can choose to be polytheistic, pantheistic, panentheistic, pandeistic, henotheistic, monotheistic, monistic, agnostic, atheistic or humanist. According to Doniger, "ideas about all the major issues of faith and lifestyle – vegetarianism, nonviolence, belief in rebirth, even caste – are subjects of debate, not dogma."

Some would argue that, because of the wide range of traditions and ideas covered by the term Hinduism, a lack of theological 'fundamentals' means that a dogmatic 'religious fundamentalism' per se is hard to find. Others point to the recent rise of Hindu nationalism in India as evidence to the contrary. The religion "defies our desire to define and categorize it." In India, the term "dharma" is preferred, which is broader than the Western term "religion."

Hence, certain scholars argue that Hinduism lacks dogma and thus a specific notion of "fundamentalism," while other scholars identify several politically active Hindu movements as part of a "Hindu fundamentalist family."

=== Islam ===
Fundamentalism within Islam goes back to the early history of Islam in the 7th century, to the time of the Kharijites. From their essentially political position, they developed extreme doctrines that set them apart from both mainstream Shia and Sunni Muslims. The Kharijites were particularly noted for adopting a radical approach to takfir, whereby they declared other Muslims to be unbelievers and therefore deemed them worthy of death.

The Shia and Sunni religious conflicts since the 7th century created an opening for radical ideologues, such as Ali Shariati (1933–77), to merge social revolution with Islamic fundamentalism, as exemplified by the Iranian Revolution in 1979. Islamic fundamentalism has appeared in many countries; the Salafi-Wahhabi version is promoted worldwide and financed by Saudi Arabia, Qatar, and Pakistan.

The Iran hostage crisis of 1979–80 marked a major turning point in the use of the term "fundamentalism". The media, in an attempt to explain the ideology of Ayatollah Khomeini and the Iranian Revolution to a Western audience described it as a "fundamentalist version of Islam" by way of analogy to the Christian fundamentalist movement in the U.S. Thus was born the term Islamic fundamentalist, which became a common use of the term in following years.

=== Judaism ===
Jewish fundamentalism has been used to characterize militant religious Zionism, and both Ashkenazi and Sephardic versions of Haredi Judaism. Ian S. Lustik has characterized "Jewish fundamentalism" as "an ultranationalist, eschatologically based, irredentist ideology".

=== New Atheism ===
The term New Atheism describes the positions of some atheist academics, writers, scientists, and philosophers of the 20th and 21st centuries. Critics have described New Atheism as "secular fundamentalism".

== Politics ==
In modern politics, fundamentalism has been associated with right-wing politics, especially social conservatism. Social conservatives often support policies which are in line with religious fundamentalism, such as support for school prayer and opposition to LGBT rights and abortion. Conversely, secularism has been associated with left-wing or liberal politics , as it takes the opposite stance to said policies, however, various left-wing policies have likewise been deemed forms of fundamentalism, notably stronger forms of wokeness.

The political usage of the term "fundamentalism" has been criticized. Political groups have used It to berate their opponents, they have used the term flexibly depending on their political interests. According to Judith Nagata, a professor of Asia Research Institute in the National University of Singapore, "The Afghan mujahiddin, locked in combat with the Soviet enemy in the 1980s, could be praised as 'freedom fighters' by their American backers at the time, while the present Taliban, viewed, among other things, as the protectors of America's enemy Osama bin Laden, are unequivocally 'fundamentalist'."

"Fundamentalist" has been pejoratively used in reference to philosophies which are perceived as being literal-minded as well as philosophies which are perceived as carrying a pretense of being the sole source of objective truth, regardless of whether or not such philosophies are usually called religions. For instance, the Archbishop of Wales has broadly criticized "atheistic fundamentalism" and said "Any kind of fundamentalism, be it Biblical, atheistic or Islamic, is dangerous". He also said, "the new fundamentalism of our age ... leads to the language of expulsion and exclusivity, of extremism and polarisation, and the claim that, because God is on our side, he is not on yours." He claimed it led to situations such as councils calling Christmas "Winterval", schools refusing to put on nativity plays and crosses being removed from chapels. Others have countered that some of these attacks on Christmas are urban legends, not all schools do nativity plays because they choose to perform other traditional plays like A Christmas Carol or "The Snow Queen" and, because of rising tensions between various religions, opening up public spaces to alternate displays rather than the Nativity scene is an attempt to keep government religion-neutral.

In The New Inquisition, Robert Anton Wilson lampoons the members of skeptical organizations such as the Committee for the Scientific Investigation of Claims of the Paranormal as fundamentalist materialists, alleging that they dogmatically dismiss any evidence that conflicts with materialism as hallucination or fraud.

In France, during a protest march against the imposition of restrictions on the wearing of headscarves in state-run schools, a banner labeled the ban as "secular fundamentalism". In the United States, private or cultural intolerance of women wearing the hijab (Islamic headcovering) and political activism by Muslims also has been labeled "secular fundamentalism".

The term "fundamentalism" is sometimes applied to signify a counter-cultural fidelity to a principle or set of principles, as in the pejorative term "market fundamentalism", used to imply exaggerated religious-like faith in the ability of unfettered laissez-faire or free-market capitalist economic views or policies to solve economic and social problems. According to economist John Quiggin, the standard features of "economic fundamentalist rhetoric" are "dogmatic" assertions and the claim that anyone who holds contrary views is not a real economist. Retired professor in religious studies Roderick Hindery lists positive qualities attributed to political, economic, or other forms of cultural fundamentalism, including "vitality, enthusiasm, willingness to back up words with actions, and the avoidance of facile compromise" as well as negative aspects such as psychological attitudes, occasionally elitist and pessimistic perspectives, and in some cases literalism.

== Criticism ==
A criticism by Elliot N. Dorff:

In order to carry out the fundamentalist program in practice, one would need a perfect understanding of the ancient language of the original text, if indeed the true text can be discerned from among variants. Furthermore, human beings are the ones who transmit this understanding between generations. Even if one wanted to follow the literal word of God, the need for people first to understand that word necessitates human interpretation. Through that process human fallibility is inextricably mixed into the very meaning of the divine word. As a result, it is impossible to follow the indisputable word of God; one can only achieve a human understanding of God's will.

Howard Thurman was interviewed in the late 1970s for a BBC feature on religion. He told the interviewer:

I say that creeds, dogmas, and theologies are inventions of the mind. It is the nature of the mind to make sense out of experience, to reduce the conglomerates of experience to units of comprehension which we call principles, or ideologies, or concepts. Religious experience is dynamic, fluid, effervescent, yeasty. But the mind can't handle these so it has to imprison religious experience in some way, get it bottled up. Then, when the experience quiets down, the mind draws a bead on it and extracts concepts, notions, dogmas, so that religious experience can make sense to the mind. Meanwhile, religious experience goes on experiencing, so that by the time I get my dogma stated so that I can think about it, the religious experience becomes an object of thought.

Influential criticisms of fundamentalism include James Barr's books on Christian fundamentalism and Bassam Tibi's analysis of Islamic fundamentalism.

A study at the University of Edinburgh found that of its six measured dimensions of religiosity, "lower intelligence is most associated with higher levels of fundamentalism."

== Use as a label ==
The Associated Press' AP Stylebook recommends that the term fundamentalist not be used for any group that does not apply the term to itself. Many scholars have adopted a similar position. Other scholars, however, use the term in the broader descriptive sense to refer to various groups in various religious traditions including those groups that would object to being classified as fundamentalists, such as in the Fundamentalism Project.

Tex Sample asserts that it is a mistake to refer to a Muslim, Jewish, or Christian fundamentalist. Rather, a fundamentalist's fundamentalism is their primary concern, over and above other denominational or faith considerations.

== See also ==
- Authoritarianism – Political system
- Biblical literalism – Approach to the interpretation of the Bible
- Brainwashing – Methods that purportedly control a person's will, desire, or knowledge
- Christian Identity – White supremacist interpretation of Christianity
- Christian nationalism – Christian ideology espousing religious nationalism
- Christian Reconstructionism – Fundamentalist Calvinist theonomic movement
- Clerical fascism – Ideology combining fascism and clericalism
- Creationism – Belief that nature originated through supernatural acts
- Creation science – Pseudoscientific form of Young Earth creationism
- Creativity (religion) – White supremacist new religious movement
- Cult – High-control social group
- Dogmatism – Beliefs accepted by members of a group without question
- Dominion theology – Ideology seeking Christian rule
- Evangelicalism – Protestant Christian movement
- Extremism – Ideology considered far outside the mainstream
- Formalism (philosophy) – Concept of focusing on form over concept
- Freedom of religion – Human right to practice, or not, a religion without conflict from governing powers
- Fundamentalism (sculpture) – Sculpture by Jens Galschiot
- Historical-grammatical method – Christian hermeneutical method
- Independent Fundamental Baptist – Christian denomination
- Indoctrination – Inculcating ideas in a person
- Integrism – Principle that the Catholic faith should be the basis of public law and policy
- Islamic extremism – Extreme or radical form of Islam
- Islamic State – Salafi jihadist militant organisation
- Islamism – Politico-religious ideology
- Kinism – Segregationist religious movement
- Legalism (theology) – Pejorative for performative Christianity
- Militant atheism – Soviet antireligious organization
- Moral absolutism – Metaethical position that some actions are intrinsically right or wrong
- New Independent Fundamental Baptist – Association of King James Bible only independent Baptist churches
- Pentecostalism – Denominational renewal movement of Protestant Christianity
- Political violence – Violence conducted with political goals
- Radical politics – Intent to transform or replace the fundamental principles of society
- Reactionary – Political view advocating return to a previous societal state
- Religion and peacebuilding
- Religion in politics
- Religious discrimination – Treating a person or group differently because of their religious beliefs
- Religious fanaticism – Fanaticism towards a religion
- Religious intolerance – Intolerance of another's religious beliefs or practices
- Religious nationalism – Relationship between national identity and religion
- Religious persecution – Persecution based on religious belief
- Religious segregation – Separation of people according to their religion
- Religious terrorism – Terrorism motivated by religious beliefs
- Religious violence – Violence practiced in the name of religion
- Religious war – War primarily over religious differences
- Restorationism – Belief that Christianity should return to the form of the early apostolic church
- Ritualism in the Church of England – Emphasis on the rituals and liturgical ceremony of the church
- Schism – Division between people in an organization or group
- Sect – Subgroup of a particular religious or ideological doctrine
- Sectarianism – Conflict between groups related to the form of government they live under
- Sectarian violence – Violence motivated by conflict between sects of ideology or religion
- State religion – Religion or creed endorsed by the state
- Supremacism – Ideology
- Theocracy – Form of government with religious leaders
- Theonomy – Christian form of government ruled by divine law
- Traditionalist Catholicism – Catholic religious movement
- True Orthodox church – Movement within Eastern Orthodox Christianity
- Violence against Muslims in independent India
- Violence against Christians in India

== Sources ==
- Ammerman, Nancy T. (1991). "North American Protestant Fundamentalism". In Marty, Martin E.; Appleby, R. Scott (eds.). Fundamentalisms Observed. The Fundamentalism Project, 1. Chicago, Il; London: University of Chicago Press. pp. 1–65. ISBN 0-226-50878-1.
- Appleby, R. Scott, Gabriel Abraham Almond, and Emmanuel Sivan (2003). Strong Religion. Chicago, Il; London: University of Chicago Press. ISBN 0-226-01497-5
- Armstrong, Karen (2001). The Battle for God: A History of Fundamentalism. New York: Ballantine Books. ISBN 0-345-39169-1
- Brasher, Brenda E. (2001). The Encyclopedia of Fundamentalism. New York: Routledge. ISBN 0-415-92244-5
- Champagne, Duane (2005). "North American Indian Religions: New Religious Movements". In Lindsay Jones (ed.). Encyclopedia of Religion: 15-volume Set. Vol. 10 (2nd ed.). Farmington Hills, Mi: Macmillan Reference USA – via Encyclopedia.com.
- Caplan, Lionel. (1987). "Studies in Religious Fundamentalism". London: The MacMillan Press Ltd.
- Dorff, Elliot N. and Rosett, Arthur, A Living Tree; The Roots and Growth of Jewish Law, SUNY Press, 1988.
- Gorenberg, Gershom. (2000). The End of Days: Fundamentalism and the Struggle for the Temple Mount. New York: The Free Press.
- Heilman, Samuel C.; Friedman, Menachem (1991). "Religious Fundamentalism and Religious Jews: The Case of the Haredim". In Marty, Martin E.; Appleby, R. Scott (eds.). Fundamentalisms Observed. The Fundamentalism Project, 1. Chicago, Il; London: University of Chicago Press. pp. 197–264. ISBN 0-226-50878-1.
- Hindery, Roderick. 2001. Indoctrination and Self-deception or Free and Critical Thought? Mellen Press: aspects of fundamentalism, pp. 69–74.
- Kay, David N. (2004). Tibetan and Zen Buddhism in Britain: Transplantation, Development and Adaptation. RoutledgeCurzon. ISBN 978-0-415-29765-3.
- Keating, Karl (1988). Catholicism and Fundamentalism. San Francisco: Ignatius. ISBN 0-89870-177-5.
- Lawrence, Bruce B. Defenders of God: The Fundamentalist Revolt against the Modern Age. San Francisco: Harper & Row, 1989.
- Marsden; George M. (1980). Fundamentalism and American Culture: The Shaping of Twentieth Century Evangelicalism, 1870-1925 Oxford University Press.
- Marty, Martin E.; Appleby, R. Scott, eds. (1991). Fundamentalisms Observed. The Fundamentalism Project, 1. Chicago, Il; London: University of Chicago Press. ISBN 0-226-50878-1.
- Marty, Martin E.; Appleby, R. Scott, eds. (1993). Fundamentalisms and Society: Reclaiming the Sciences, the Family, and Education. The Fundamentalism Project, 2. Chicago, Il; London: University of Chicago Press. ISBN 0-226-50880-3.
- Marty, Martin E.; Appleby, R. Scott, eds. (1993). Fundamentalisms and the State: Remaking Polities, Economies, and Militance. The Fundamentalism Project, 3. Chicago, Il; London: University of Chicago Press. ISBN 0-226-50883-8.
- Marty, Martin E.; Appleby, R. Scott, eds. (1994). Accounting for Fundamentalisms: The Dynamic Character of Movements. The Fundamentalism Project, 4. Chicago, Il; London: University of Chicago Press. ISBN 0-226-50885-4.
- Marty, Martin E.; Appleby, R. Scott, eds. (1995). Fundamentalisms Comprehended. The Fundamentalism Project, 5. Chicago, Il; London: University of Chicago Press. ISBN 0-226-50887-0.
- Noll, Mark A. (1992). A History of Christianity in the United States and Canada. Grand Rapids: Eerdmans.
- Ruthven, Malise (2005). "Fundamentalism: The Search for Meaning". Oxford: Oxford University Press. ISBN 0-19-280606-8
- Schaik, Sam van (June 28, 2011). Tibet: A History. Yale University Press. ISBN 978-0-300-15404-7.
- Schirrmacher, Thomas (2013). Fundamentalism: When Religion becomes Dangerous. VKW. ISBN 978-3-86269-054-1.
- Torrey, R.A. (ed.). (1909). The Fundamentals. Los Angeles: The Bible Institute of Los Angeles (B.I.O.L.A. now Biola University). ISBN 0-8010-1264-3
- "Religious movements: fundamentalist." In Goldstein, Norm (Ed.) (2003). The Associated Press Stylebook and Briefing on Media Law 2003 (38th ed.), p. 218. New York: The Associated Press. ISBN 0-917360-22-2.
