= Tila, Israel =

Planned city in southern Israel

Tila (Hebrew: תילה) is a planned Haredi city in the northern Negev desert in southern Israel. Once constructed, it will be under the Bnei Shimon Regional Council.

The city is intended to accommodate around 80,000 Haredim with 15,000 apartments currently being constructed.

== See also ==
- Kasif, Israel
