= Kasif, Israel =

Coordinates: 31.2616°N 35.1100°E

Kasif (Hebrew: כסיף, lit. 'Silver') is a future planned Haredi city in the Negev desert in southern Israel. The city will be located at the Tel Arad junction, near Highways 80 and 31. The city is being constructed as a solution to the housing shortage faced by Israel's rapidly growing Ultra-Orthodox population.

== Development plans ==
In the first stage of the construction phase, 10,000 housing units will be built for a population of 50,000 people on 4,759 dunams (1,188 acres) of land, though additional expansion will be carried out later, as the Israeli Interior Ministry expects the city's population to double. The city's total size is expected to cover about 6,400 dunams (1,600 acres). The land zoning and internal land use will be based on the Haredi lifestyle. There will be high-density construction of 4–5 story buildings and 15–20% private housing units. The population will reside mainly in apartment buildings with no elevators and fairly large apartments, and extensive land has been zoned for schools and religious cultural centers, and for commercial and business space that will provide suitable employment for the city's population.

In November 2013 the construction plans for Kasif were authorized by the Israeli government, together with another planned city, Hiran. The report said that the city of Kasif is expected to include about 12,000 housing units. Further authorization was received in 2015. Detailed planning is expected to be completed in 2016, and the marketing of lots is expected to begin in 2017.

== See also ==
- Tila, Israel
