= Fundamentalism Project =

The Fundamentalism Project was an international scholarly investigation of conservative religious movements throughout the world, funded by the American Academy of Arts and Sciences. The project began in 1987 and was directed by Academy members Martin E. Marty of the University of Chicago Divinity School and R. Scott Appleby of the University of Notre Dame; it concluded in 1995. The understanding of fundamentalism framing the project was considered controversial, though even scholars with criticism of the assumptions upon which the project was based pointed to a great deal of useful empirical information to be found in the publications that had grown out of the project.

According to The Academy in 1996:

The information and analysis produced by this study continue to inform the public agenda as the United States struggles to deal with the impact of religious fundamentalism on international security in the twenty-first century.

A definition of fundamentalism given by the Encyclopedia Britannica online states:

type[s] of conservative religious movement[s] characterized by the advocacy of strict conformity to sacred texts.

Whereas The Fundamentalism Project (1991–95)

viewed fundamentalism primarily as the militant rejection of secular modernity.

== Volumes ==
- Fundamentalisms Observed. The Fundamentalism Project, vol. 1. Chicago, Il; London: University of Chicago Press. 1991. ISBN 0-226-50878-1.
- Fundamentalisms and Society: Reclaiming the Sciences, the Family, and Education. The Fundamentalism Project, vol. 2. Chicago, Il; London: University of Chicago Press. 1993. ISBN 0-226-50880-3.
- Fundamentalisms and the State: Remaking Polities, Economies, and Militance. The Fundamentalism Project, vol. 3. Chicago, Il; London: University of Chicago Press. 1993. ISBN 0-226-50883-8.
- Accounting for Fundamentalisms: The Dynamic Character of Movements. The Fundamentalism Project, vol. 4. Chicago, Il; London: University of Chicago Press. 1994. ISBN 0-226-50885-4.
- Fundamentalisms Comprehended. The Fundamentalism Project, vol. 5. Chicago, Il; London: University of Chicago Press. 1995. ISBN 0-226-50887-0.

== See also ==
- Modernism in the Catholic Church
