= Ichud HaKehillos LeTohar HaMachane =

Religious organization

The Ichud HaKehillos LeTohar HaMachane (Hebrew: איחוד הקהילות לטוהר המחנה; "union of communities for the purity of the camp") is an Orthodox Jewish organization. It educates Jews about pornography-use habits, Internet addiction, and other problems that the organization believes can result from Internet usage.

== Technology Awareness Group ==
The Ichud HaKehillos has founded a sister group called the Technology Awareness Group ("TAG"). It provides various services to its target market, including installing and configuring Web filtering and monitoring software on computers, smartphones and other devices. TAG is a nonprofit organization staffed by volunteers. Some bigger offices have paid staff. TAG has offices in the US, Canada, Europe, Australia and elsewhere. TAG offices around the world field thousands of phone calls and emails from around the world every day.

As of January 2020, TAG operates 40 offices in 16 countries and territories. TAG operates 6 offices in the UK, as well as 3 offices in Israel; other similar Israeli organizations include OutNet and the היעוץ המקצועי שעל ידי ועידת הרבנים לביצור חומת הדת technology advice hotline.

As of January 2025, TAG has 55 offices worldwide. https://tag.org/

== Gatherings ==
To help promote awareness of the issues at hand, the Ichud HaKehillos has organized some gatherings.

On September 27, 2005, a gathering was held in Lakewood, New Jersey, shortly before Rosh Hashana. The leaders enacted a policy that children with Internet access are subject to being dismissed from any private Orthodox Jewish school in Lakewood.

=== Internet Asifa ===
Internet Asifa, or Kinus Klal Yisrael, was a rally organized by Ichud HaKehillos LeTohar HaMachane on May 20, 2012, to raise awareness about the negative consequences the internet and related technology was having in the Haredi community, to discourage the usage of the internet, and to promote the use of internet filters when the internet was being accessed. The rally was held at Citi Field and Arthur Ashe Stadium, New York City, and attended by over 60,000 people. Women were not allowed to attend the rally due to religious modesty concerns but were able to watch from closed circuit television at satellite locations. The media was also barred from entering due to stated "homeland security concerns," as per the rally's spokesman.

The rally was widely discussed in Orthodox Jewish online blogs and forums. Much discussion centered around the irony of how the internet was utilized by event attendees and members of the Orthodox Jewish community to promote an event which explicitly discouraged usage of the internet. Further discussion centered around speculation that some of the organizations sponsoring and promoting the event had ties to internet filter companies and had financial incentives from the religious promotion of internet filters.
