= R. Scott Appleby =

American religious historian

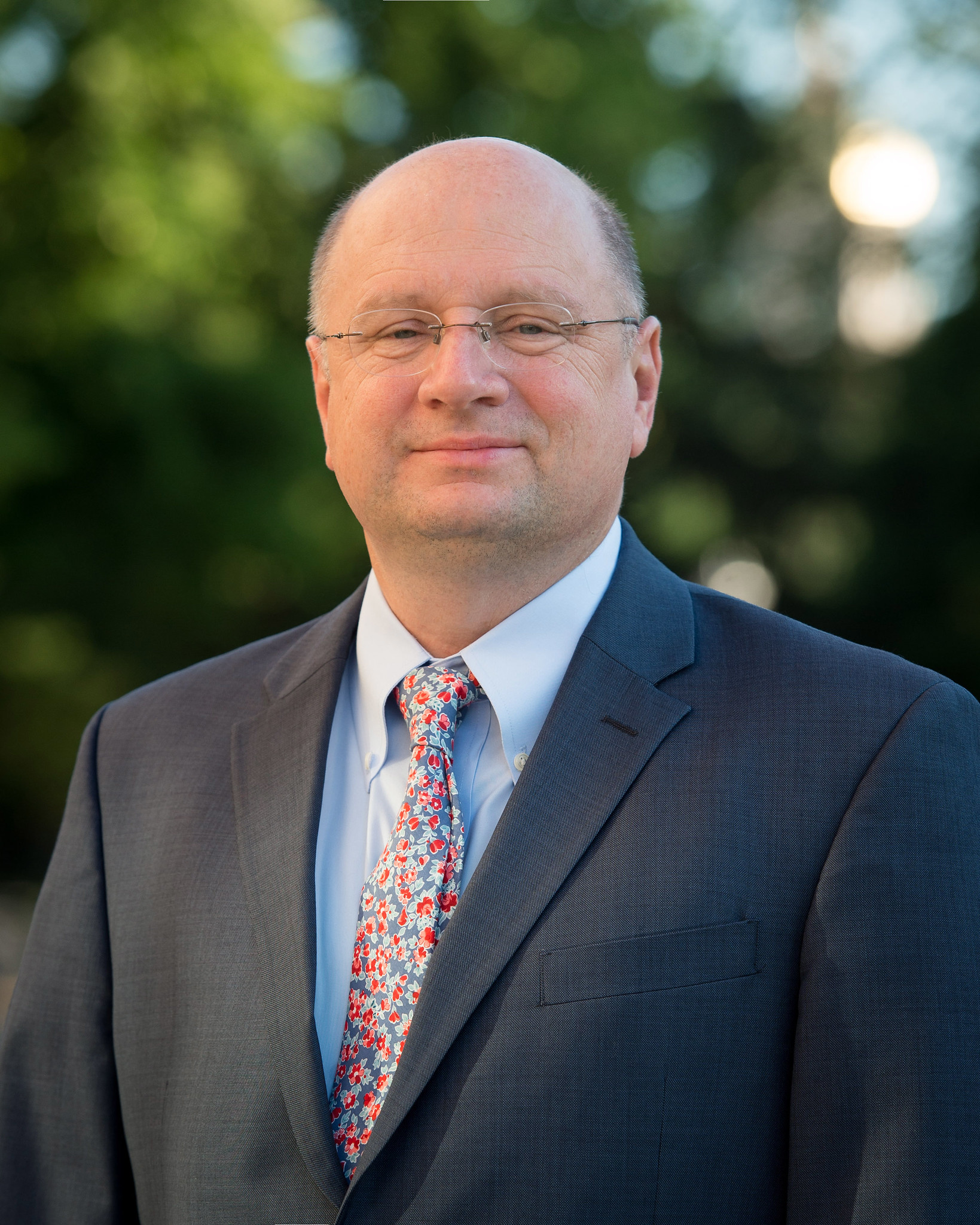
- Born: Robert Scott Appleby; 1956 (age 69–70)

Academic background
- Education: University of Notre Dame; University of Chicago
- Thesis: American Catholic Modernism at the Turn of the Century (1985)
- Doctoral advisor: Martin E. Marty

Academic work
- Discipline: History
- Sub-discipline: History of religion
- Institutions: Saint Xavier College; University of Notre Dame

Robert Scott Appleby (born 1956) is an American historian, focusing in global religion and its relationship to peace and conflict, integral human development, and comparative modern religion. He is a Professor of history at the University of Notre Dame and served as the Marilyn Keough Dean of the Keough School of Global Affairs from 2014 to 2024.

== Life ==
Appleby graduated from Notre Dame in 1978. He earned his PhD from the University of Chicago in 1985. From 1982 to 1987, he chaired the religious studies department of Saint Xavier College, Chicago. From 1988 to 1993, he was co-director, with Martin E. Marty, of the Fundamentalism Project, an international scholarly public policy study of religious movements throughout the world, funded by the American Academy of Arts and Sciences. He has been a faculty member at the University of Notre Dame since 1994, where he became the John M. Regan Jr. Director of the Kroc Institute for International Peace Studies. He co-directs, with Ebrahim Moosa and Atalia Omer, the Contending Modernities project, which explores the interaction among Catholic, Muslim, and secular forces in the modern world.

Appleby was named the founding dean of the Keough School of Global Affairs at Notre Dame in 2014, where he served until June 30, 2024.

In 2011, Appleby gave the "Cole Lectures" at Vanderbilt University. Previous speakers include George Arthur Buttrick, Paul Tillich, and Jim Wallis.

In February 2017, he gave a lecture at the 3rd SRP Distinguished Lecture and Symposium of the S. Rajaratnam School of International Studies at Nanyang Technological University in Singapore.

He is a board member of the George Mason University Center for World Religions, Diplomacy, and Conflict Resolution. He serves on the advisory board of The Charles and Margaret Hall Cushwa Center for the Study of American Catholicism at Notre Dame.

== Works ==
Appleby is the general editor of the Cornell University Press series Catholicism in Twentieth Century America, and lead editor of the Oxford University Press book series Studies in Strategic Peacebuilding. Appleby co-edited with Atalia Omer The Oxford Handbook on Religion, Conflict and Peacebuilding (Oxford University Press, 2015).

=== Books ===
- Transforming Parish Ministry: The Changing Roles of Clergy, Laity, and Women Religious (1989)
- Fundamentalism Project with Martin E. Marty, five-volumes (Chicago, 1991–2004)
- The Ambivalence of the Sacred: Religion, Violence, and Reconciliation, (Rowman & Littlefield, 2000)
- Church and the Age Unite! The Modernist Impulses in American Catholicism, (University of Notre Dame Press, 1992)
- Peacebuilding: Catholic Theology, Ethics and Praxis (Orbis, 2010)
- Catholics in the American Century (Cornell University Press, 2012)

=== Articles ===
- "Job Description for the Next Pope", Foreign Policy, (2009)

== Awards ==
Appleby was the 2001 Mahatma M.K. Gandhi Fellow of the American Academy of Political and Social Sciences The Baptist Theological Union of the University of Chicago Divinity School named Appleby Alumnus of the Year for 2003.

He was named founding dean of the University of Notre Dame's Keough School of Global Affairs in 2014. In 2019 Appleby was honored with the Religion and International Studies Distinguished Scholar Award from the International Studies Association.
